= Wyoming Democratic Party =

Wyoming affiliate of the Democratic Party

- Chairperson: Lucas Fralick
- Senate Minority Leader: Mike Gierau
- House Minority Leader: Mike Yin
- Headquarters: Cheyenne, Wyoming
- Membership (August 27, 2025): 41,785
- National affiliation: Democratic Party
- Colors: Blue
- Wyoming Senate: 2 / 31
- Wyoming House of Representatives: 6 / 62
- United States Senate: 0 / 2
- United States House Of Representatives: 0 / 1
- Statewide Executive Offices: 0 / 5

Election symbol

Website
- wyodems.org

The Wyoming Democratic Party is the affiliate of the state's Democratic Party, headquartered in Cheyenne, Wyoming. The party was strong during Wyoming's territorial days, but suffered a decline in its early statehood. It rose to prominence again from the 1930s to the 1950s before experiencing another decline.

The party is led by Chris Rothfuss in the state senate and Mike Yin in the state house. The party currently has very weak electoral power in the state, and is one of the weakest affiliates of the national Democratic Party. It currently controls none of Wyoming's statewide and/or federal elected offices and very few seats in the Wyoming Legislature.

== History ==
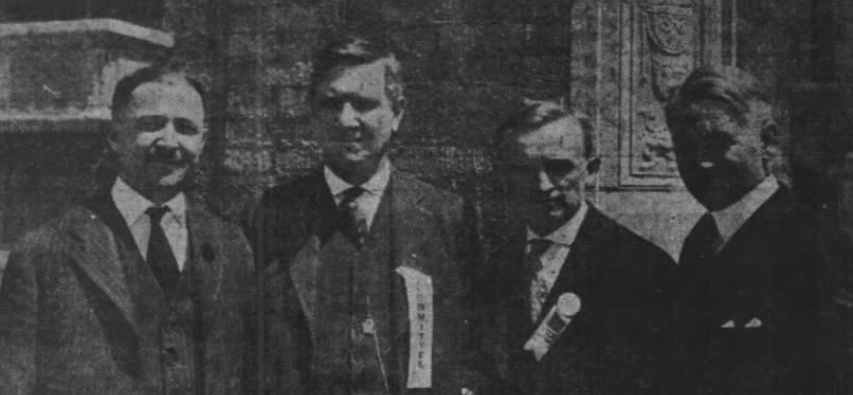
Members of the Wyoming delegation at the 1924 Democratic National Convention.

On September 2, 1869, Wyoming held its first territorial elections and the Democratic party won in a landslide winning all nine seats in the Council and all twelve seats in the House of Representatives. In 1889, the party selected fifteen delegates to the Wyoming constitutional convention to draft its constitution to be submitted for statehood that included Henry S. Elliott, George W. Baxter, Anthony C. Campbell, Henry A. Coffeen, William C. Irvine, James A. Johnston, Edward J. Morris, John M. McCandlish, Caleb P. Organ, Louis J. Palmer, John L. Russell, Charles H. Burritt, Douglas A. Preston, Thomas R. Reid, and Noyes Baldwin.

In the 1920 elections the party was defeated in a landslide by the Republicans with Warren G. Harding flipping the state in the presidential election after gaining 22.29% from Charles Evans Hughes' performance in 1916, losing seven of their ten senate seats, and losing ten of their eleven house seats with Thurman Arnold of Albany county as the only Democratic member of the state house. However, the party improved in the 1922 elections and gained twenty-two seats in the state house.

In the 1934 elections the party won every statewide office for the only time in its history and took control of the state senate for the first time since statehood. However, in the 1938 elections the party lost all three of the five statewide offices and lost control of both legislative chambers and since then has never held a majority in the state senate and only held a majority in the state house for four years.

In 1958, the Democrats regained control of the state house for the first time in twenty years. The Democrats lost the state house in the 1960 election.

On May 11, 1974, delegates to the party's state convention voted to add the impeachment of President Richard Nixon to the state party's platform. In the 1984 state legislative elections the party lost seven seats in the House of Representatives due to Governor Edgar Herschler's unpopular decision to veto a homeowners tax credit program stating that it would subsidize homeowners who did not need it.

Chuck Graves, who was then the party's chairman, criticized the Democratic National Committee for including Wyoming as a state that was too Republican and would be written off during the 1992 presidential election along with Nevada, Idaho, and Utah.

During the 2002 elections the national party gave the party $25,000. During the 2006 elections the national party conducted a fifty-state strategy under Chairman Howard Dean's leadership and invested large amounts of money in swing and red states. In 2005 the national committee started sending $10,000 per month for staff support and in 2006 it paid for field and communications directors and invested $100,000 into the party. In the 2006 House election Gary Trauner was narrowly defeated by Representative Barbara Cubin and was the closest the party had come to winning Wyoming's federal House seat since Teno Roncalio won reelection in 1976.

During the 2020 election, the party reimagined its presidential preference caucus into the state's first ranked choice voting election. Initially planned as a hybrid in-person and mail-in caucus, due to the COVID-19 pandemic the party eventually shifted to mail-in only format. Ultimately, the 2020 Wyoming Democratic caucus voter turnout was more than double than in 2016.

== Officials ==
=== Congressional ===
Past congressional officials
- Gale W. McGee, United States Senator (1959–1977)
- John J. Hickey, United States Senator (1961–1962)
- Joseph C. O'Mahoney, United States Senator (1934–1953; 1954–1961)
- Lester C. Hunt, United States Senator (1949–1954)
- Henry H. Schwartz, United States Senator (1937–1943)
- John B. Kendrick, United States Senator (1917–1933)
- Teno Roncalio, United States Representative from Wyoming's at-large district (1965–1967; 1971–1978)
- John J. McIntyre, United States Representative from Wyoming's at-large district (1941–1943)
- Paul Ranous Greever, United States Representative from Wyoming's at-large district (1935–1939)
- John Eugene Osborne, United States Representative from Wyoming's at-large district (1897–1899)
- Henry A. Coffeen, United States Representative from Wyoming's at-large district (1893–1895)
- Morton Everel Post, Delegate to the United States House from Wyoming Territory's at-large district (1881–1885)
- William Randolph Steele, Delegate to the United States House from Wyoming Territory's at-large district (1873–1877)
- Stephen Friel Nuckolls, Delegate to the United States House from Wyoming Territory's at-large district (1869–1871)

=== State officials ===
Past statewide officials
- Dave Freudenthal, Governor of Wyoming (2003–2011)
- Mike Sullivan, Governor of Wyoming (1987–1995)
- Edgar Herschler, Governor of Wyoming (1975–1987)
- Jack R. Gage, Governor of Wyoming (1961–1963)
- John J. Hickey, Governor of Wyoming (1959–1961)
- Lester C. Hunt, Governor of Wyoming (1943–1949)
- Leslie A. Miller, Governor of Wyoming (1933–1939)
- Nellie Tayloe Ross, Governor of Wyoming (1925–1927)
- William B. Ross, Governor of Wyoming (1923–1924)
- Frank L. Houx, Governor of Wyoming (1917–1919)
- John B. Kendrick, Governor of Wyoming (1915–1917)
- John Eugene Osborne, Governor of Wyoming (1893–1895)
- Thomas Moonlight, Governor of Wyoming Territory (1887–1889)
- George W. Baxter, Governor of Wyoming Territory (1886)
- Kathy Karpan, Secretary of State (1987–1995)
- Jack R. Gage, Secretary of State (1959–1961)
- William M. Jack, Secretary of State (1944–1947)
- Lester C. Hunt, Secretary of State (1935–1943)
- Frank L. Houx, Secretary of State (1911–1919)
- Samuel D. Shannon, Secretary of the Territory (1877–1888)
- Jason B. Brown, Secretary of the Territory (1873–1875)
- John J. McIntyre, Auditor (1945–1946)
- Carl Robinson, Auditor (1944)
- William M. Jack, Auditor (1935–1944)
- Benjamin Gallagher, Territorial Auditor (1869–1870)
- J. Kirk Baldwin, Treasurer (1935–1939)
- John W. Donnellan Territorial Treasurer (1869–1872)
- Lynn Simons, Superintendent of Public Instruction (1979–1991)
- Velma Linford, Superintendent of Public Instruction (1955–1963)
- Jack R. Gage, Superintendent of Public Instruction (1935–1939)
- C. H. Parmelee, Superintendent of Public Instruction (1898)
Past state legislature officials
- Mike Gierau, state senator (2019–present)
- Andi Clifford, state representative (2019–present)
- Mike Yin, state representative (2019–present)
- Sara Burlingame, state representative (2019–present)
- Liisa Anselmi-Dalton, state senator (2017–present)
- Charles Pelkey, state representative (2015–present)
- JoAnn Dayton-Selman, state representative (2015–present)
- Chris Rothfuss, state senator (2011–present)
- Cathy Connolly, state representative (2009–present)
- Stan Blake, state representative (2007–present)
- Mary Throne, state representative (2007–2017)
- Della Herbst, state representative (1983–1987)
- Herman F. Krueger, state representative (1931–1939; 1941–1943)
- Thurman Arnold, state representative (1921–1923)
- Theodore C. Diers, state senator (1915–1919)
- Theodore C. Diers, state representative (1913–1915)
- Otto L. Burns, state representative (1913–1915)
- Jacob Berner, state senator (1911–1919)
- James R. Carpenter, state senator (1911–1915)
- George H. Cross, state senator (1895–1897; 1909–1913)
- Robert H. Homer, territorial legislature
Past local officials
- Guy Padgett, mayor of Casper (2005–2006)
- Della Herbst, mayor of Sheridan (1993–1996)
- Paul Ranous Greever, mayor of Cody (1930–1932)
- Thurman Arnold, mayor of Laramie (1923–1924)

=== Leaders ===
Past House Leaders
- Mike Yin, House Minority Leader (2023-present)
- Cathy Connolly, House Minority Leader (2017–2023)
- Mary Throne, House Minority Leader (2013–2017)
- Herman F. Krueger, Speaker of the House (1937–1939)
- Thurman Arnold, House Minority Leader (1921–1923)
Other party officials
- Will Reid, Secretary (1904)

== Electoral performance ==
=== Presidential ===
Electoral performance

President
Election year	Vote percentage	+/–	Votes	Presidential candidate	Vice presidential candidate	Result
1892	46.14 / 100	Steady	7,722	James B. Weaver (Note: Although Grover Cleveland was the national presidential candidate his supporters in Kansas, Colorado, North Dakota, and Wyoming fused with the Populist Weaver.)	James G. Field (Note: Although Adlai Stevenson I was the national presidential candidate his supporters in Kansas, Colorado, North Dakota, and Wyoming fused with the Populist Fields.)	Lost
1896	51.49 / 100	▲5.35	10,861	William Jennings Bryan	Arthur Sewall; Thomas E. Watson	Won
1900	41.17 / 100	▼10.32	10,164	William Jennings Bryan	Adlai Stevenson I	Lost
1904	29.08 / 100	▼12.09	8,930	Alton B. Parker	Henry Gassaway Davis	Lost
1908	39.67 / 100	▲10.59	14,918	William Jennings Bryan	John W. Kern	Lost
1912	36.20 / 100	▼3.47	15,310	Woodrow Wilson	Thomas R. Marshall	Won
1916	54.62 / 100	▲18.42	28,316	Woodrow Wilson	Thomas R. Marshall	Won
1920	31.86 / 100	▼22.76	17,429	James M. Cox	Franklin D. Roosevelt	Lost
1924	16.11 / 100	▼15.75	12,868	John W. Davis	Charles W. Bryan	Lost
1928	35.37 / 100	▲19.26	29,299	Al Smith	Joseph Taylor Robinson	Lost
1932	56.07 / 100	▲20.70	54,370	Franklin D. Roosevelt	John Nance Garner	Won
1936	60.58 / 100	▲4.51	62,624	Franklin D. Roosevelt	John Nance Garner	Won
1940	52.82 / 100	▼7.76	59,287	Franklin D. Roosevelt	Henry A. Wallace	Won
1944	48.77 / 100	▼4.05	49,419	Franklin D. Roosevelt	Harry S. Truman	Lost
1948	51.62 / 100	▲2.85	52,354	Harry S. Truman	Alben W. Barkley	Won
1952	37.09 / 100	▼14.53	47,934	Adlai Stevenson II	John Sparkman	Lost
1956	39.92 / 100	▲2.83	49,554	Adlai Stevenson II	Estes Kefauver	Lost
1960	44.99 / 100	▲5.07	63,331	John F. Kennedy	Lyndon B. Johnson	Lost
1964	56.56 / 100	▲11.57	80,718	Lyndon B. Johnson	Hubert Humphrey	Won
1968	35.51 / 100	▼21.05	45,173	Hubert Humphrey	Edmund Muskie	Lost
1972	30.47 / 100	▼5.04	44,358	George McGovern	Sargent Shriver	Lost
1976	39.81 / 100	▲9.34	62,239	Jimmy Carter	Walter Mondale	Lost
1980	27.97 / 100	▼11.84	49,427	Jimmy Carter	Walter Mondale	Lost
1984	28.24 / 100	▲0.27	53,370	Walter Mondale	Geraldine Ferraro	Lost
1988	38.01 / 100	▲9.77	67,113	Michael Dukakis	Lloyd Bentsen	Lost
1992	34.10 / 100	▼3.91	68,160	Bill Clinton	Al Gore	Lost
1996	36.84 / 100	▲2.74	77,934	Bill Clinton	Al Gore	Lost
2000	27.70 / 100	▼9.14	60,481	Al Gore	Joe Lieberman	Lost
2004	29.07 / 100	▲1.37	70,776	John Kerry	John Edwards	Lost
2008	32.54 / 100	▲3.47	82,868	Barack Obama	Joe Biden	Lost
2012	27.82 / 100	▼4.72	69,286	Barack Obama	Joe Biden	Lost
2016	21.63 / 100	▼6.19	55,973	Hillary Clinton	Tim Kaine	Lost
2020	26.55 / 100	▲4.92	73,491	Joe Biden	Kamala Harris	Lost
2024	25.84 / 100	▼0.71	69,527	Kamala Harris	Tim Walz	Lost

=== Congressional ===
Electoral performance

United States House of Representatives
Election year	Vote percentage	+/–	Votes	No. of overall seats won	+/–
1890	41.78 / 100	Steady	6,520	0 / 1	Steady
1892	51.34 / 100	▲9.56%	8,855	1 / 1	▲1
1894	32.17 / 100	▼19.17%	6,152	0 / 1	▼1
1896	49.14 / 100	▲16.97%	10,310	1 / 1	▲1
1898	43.04 / 100	▼6.10%	8,466	0 / 1	▼1
1900	40.79 / 100	▼2.25%	10,017	0 / 1	Steady
1902	36.00 / 100	▼4.79%	8,892	0 / 1	Steady
1904	32.21 / 100	▼3.79%	9,903	0 / 1	Steady
1906	33.07 / 100	▲0.86%	8,944	0 / 1	Steady
1908	36.32 / 100	▲3.25%	13,643	0 / 1	Steady
1910	39.48 / 100	▲3.16%	14,659	0 / 1	Steady
1912	35.72 / 100	▼3.76%	14,720	0 / 1	Steady
1914	41.45 / 100	▲5.73%	17,246	0 / 1	Steady
1916	47.96 / 100	▲6.51%	24,156	0 / 1	Steady
1918	35.81 / 100	▼12.15%	14,639	0 / 1	Steady
1920	26.50 / 100	▼9.31%	14,952	0 / 1	Steady
1922	45.98 / 100	▲19.48%	27,017	0 / 1	Steady
1924	38.91 / 100	▼7.07%	28,537	0 / 1	Steady
1926	38.72 / 100	▼0.19%	25,082	0 / 1	Steady
1928	47.81 / 100	▲9.09%	35,972	0 / 1	Steady
1930	34.38 / 100	▼13.43%	23,519	0 / 1	Steady
1932	47.74 / 100	▲13.36%	43,056	0 / 1	Steady
1934	58.31 / 100	▲10.57%	53,288	1 / 1	▲1
1936	57.17 / 100	▼1.14%	56,204	1 / 1	Steady
1938	47.12 / 100	▼10.05%	44,525	0 / 1	▼1
1940	53.35 / 100	▲6.23%	57,030	1 / 1	▲1
1942	49.28 / 100	▼4.07%	36,892	0 / 1	▼1
1944	44.30 / 100	▼4.98%	42,569	0 / 1	Steady
1946	43.99 / 100	▼0.31%	34,956	0 / 1	Steady
1948	48.48 / 100	▲4.49%	47,246	0 / 1	Steady
1950	45.51 / 100	▼2.97%	42,483	0 / 1	Steady
1952	39.90 / 100	▼5.61%	50,559	0 / 1	Steady
1954	43.82 / 100	▲3.92%	47,660	0 / 1	Steady
1956	41.81 / 100	▼2.01%	50,225	0 / 1	Steady
1958	46.42 / 100	▲4.61%	51,886	0 / 1	Steady
1960	47.71 / 100	▲1.29%	64,090	0 / 1	Steady
1962	38.62 / 100	▼9.09%	44,985	0 / 1	Steady
1964	50.79 / 100	▲12.17%	70,693	1 / 1	▲1
1966	47.70 / 100	▼3.09%	57,442	0 / 1	▼1
1968	37.26 / 100	▼10.44%	45,950	0 / 1	Steady
1970	50.26 / 100	▲13.00%	58,456	1 / 1	▲1
1972	51.70 / 100	▲1.44%	75,632	1 / 1	Steady
1974	54.70 / 100	▲3.00%	69,434	1 / 1	Steady
1976	56.44 / 100	▲1.74%	85,721	1 / 1	Steady
1978	41.37 / 100	▼15.07%	53,522	0 / 1	▼1
1980	31.43 / 100	▼9.94%	53,338	0 / 1	Steady
1982	28.91 / 100	▼2.52%	46,041	0 / 1	Steady
1984	24.40 / 100	▼4.51%	45,857	0 / 1	Steady
1986	30.72 / 100	▲6.32%	48,780	0 / 1	Steady
1988	31.82 / 100	▲1.10%	56,527	0 / 1	Steady
1989	42.98 / 100	▲11.16%	60,845	0 / 1	Steady
1990	44.91 / 100	▲1.93%	70,977	0 / 1	Steady
1992	39.30 / 100	▼5.61%	77,418	0 / 1	Steady
1994	41.30 / 100	▲2.00%	81,022	0 / 1	Steady
1996	40.82 / 100	▼0.48%	85,724	0 / 1	Steady
1998	38.69 / 100	▼2.13%	67,399	0 / 1	Steady
2000	28.56 / 100	▼10.13%	60,638	0 / 1	Steady
2002	36.21 / 100	▲7.65%	65,961	0 / 1	Steady
2004	41.83 / 100	▲5.62%	99,989	0 / 1	Steady
2006	47.74 / 100	▲5.91%	92,324	0 / 1	Steady
2008	42.81 / 100	▼4.93%	106,758	0 / 1	Steady
2010	24.48 / 100	▼18.33%	45,768	0 / 1	Steady
2012	23.83 / 100	▼0.65%	57,573	0 / 1	Steady
2014	22.90 / 100	▼0.93%	37,803	0 / 1	Steady
2016	29.97 / 100	▲7.07%	75,466	0 / 1	Steady
2018	29.77 / 100	▼0.20%	59,903	0 / 1	Steady
2020	24.58 / 100	▼5.19%	66,576	0 / 1	Steady
2022	24.37 / 100	▼0.22%	47,250	0 / 1	Steady
2024	23.24 / 100	▼1.13%	60,778	0 / 1	Steady

United States Senate
Election year	Vote percentage	+/–	Votes	No. of overall seats won	+/–
1916	51.47 / 100	Steady	26,324	1 / 2	▲1
1918	42.23 / 100	Steady	17,528	1 / 2	Steady
1922	56.74 / 100	▲5.27	35,734	1 / 2	Steady
1924	43.07 / 100	▲0.84	33,536	1 / 2	Steady
1928	53.50 / 100	▼3.24	43,032	1 / 2	Steady
1930	40.95 / 100	▼2.12	30,259	1 / 2	Steady
1934	56.62 / 100	▲3.12	53,806	1 / 2	Steady
1936	53.83 / 100	▲12.66	53,919	2 / 2	▲1
1940	58.74 / 100	▲2.12	65,022	2 / 2	Steady
1942	45.41 / 100	▼8.42	34,503	1 / 2	▼1
1946	56.21 / 100	▼2.53	45,843	1 / 2	Steady
1948	57.11 / 100	▲11.70	57,953	2 / 2	▲1
1952	48.36 / 100	▼7.85	62,921	1 / 2	▼1
1954	51.53 / 100	▲5.58	57,845	1 / 2	Steady
1958	50.84 / 100	▲2.48	58,035	2 / 2	▲1
1960	43.63 / 100	▼7.90	60,447	1 / 2	▼1
1964	53.99 / 100	▲3.15	76,485	1 / 2	Steady
1966	48.20 / 100	▲4.57	59,141	1 / 2	Steady
1970	55.78 / 100	▲1.79	67,207	1 / 2	Steady
1972	28.69 / 100	▼19.51	40,753	1 / 2	Steady
1976	45.41 / 100	▼10.37	70,558	0 / 2	▼1
1978	37.83 / 100	▲9.14	50,456	0 / 2	Steady
1982	43.34 / 100	▼2.07	72,466	0 / 2	Steady
1984	21.68 / 100	▼16.15	40,525	0 / 2	Steady
1988	49.63 / 100	▲6.29	89,821	0 / 2	Steady
1990	36.06 / 100	▲14.38	56,848	0 / 2	Steady
1994	39.31 / 100	▼10.32	79,287	0 / 2	Steady
1996	42.21 / 100	▲6.15	89,103	0 / 2	Steady
2000	22.04 / 100	▼17.27	47,087	0 / 2	Steady
2002	27.05 / 100	▼15.16	49,570	0 / 2	Steady
2006	29.86 / 100	▲7.82	57,671	0 / 2	Steady
2008	24.26 / 100	▼2.79	66,202	0 / 2	Steady
2012	21.65 / 100	▼8.21	53,019	0 / 2	Steady
2014	17.45 / 100	▼6.81	29,377	0 / 2	Steady
2018	30.10 / 100	▲8.45	61,227	0 / 2	Steady
2020	26.76 / 100	▲9.31	72,766	0 / 2	Steady
2024	24.12 / 100	▼5.98	63,727	0 / 2	Steady

=== Gubernatorial ===
Electoral performance

Governor
Election year	Vote percentage	+/–	Votes	Candidate	Result
1890	44.62 / 100	Steady	7,153	George W. Baxter	Lost
1892	53.84 / 100	▲9.22	9,290	John Eugene Osborne	Won
1894	36.11 / 100	▼17.73	6,965	William H. Holliday	Lost
1898	45.39 / 100	▲9.28	8,989	Horace C. Alger	Lost
1902	39.99 / 100	▼5.40	10,017	George T. Beck	Lost
1904	39.27 / 100	▼0.72	12,137	John Eugene Osborne	Lost
1906	34.85 / 100	▼4.42	9,444	Stephen A. D. Keister	Lost
1910	55.60 / 100	▲20.75	21,086	Joseph M. Carey	Won
1914	51.61 / 100	▼3.99	22,387	John B. Kendrick	Won
1918	43.90 / 100	▼7.71	18,640	Frank L. Houx	Lost
1922	50.03 / 100	▲6.13	31,110	William B. Ross	Won
1924	55.12 / 100	▲5.09	43,323	Nellie Tayloe Ross	Won
1926	48.95 / 100	▼6.17	34,286	Nellie Tayloe Ross	Lost
1930	49.42 / 100	▲0.47	37,188	Leslie A. Miller	Lost
1932	50.58 / 100	▲1.16	48,130	Leslie A. Miller	Won
1934	57.91 / 100	▲7.33	54,305	Leslie A. Miller	Won
1938	40.19 / 100	▼17.72	38,501	Leslie A. Miller	Lost
1942	51.32 / 100	▲11.13	39,599	Lester C. Hunt	Won
1946	52.88 / 100	▲1.56	43,020	Lester C. Hunt	Won
1950	43.85 / 100	▼9.03	42,518	John J. McIntyre	Lost
1954	49.50 / 100	▲5.65	55,163	William M. Jack	Lost
1958	48.94 / 100	▼0.56	55,070	John J. Hickey	Won
1962	45.53 / 100	▼3.41	54,298	Jack R. Gage	Lost
1966	45.71 / 100	▲0.18	55,249	Ernest Wilkerson	Lost
1970	37.21 / 100	▼8.50	44,008	John J. Rooney	Lost
1974	55.88 / 100	▲18.67	71,741	Edgar Herschler	Won
1978	50.86 / 100	▼5.02	69,972	Edgar Herschler	Won
1982	63.14 / 100	▲12.28	106,427	Edgar Herschler	Won
1986	53.96 / 100	▼9.18	88,879	Mike Sullivan	Won
1990	65.35 / 100	▲11.39	104,638	Mike Sullivan	Won
1994	40.18 / 100	▼25.17	80,747	Kathy Karpan	Lost
1998	40.46 / 100	▲0.28	70,754	John Vinich	Lost
2002	49.96 / 100	▲9.51	92,662	Dave Freudenthal	Won
2006	69.99 / 100	▲20.03	135,516	Dave Freudenthal	Won
2010	22.94 / 100	▼47.05	43,240	Leslie Petersen	Lost
2014	27.25 / 100	▲4.31	45,752	Pete Gosar	Lost
2018	27.54 / 100	▲0.29	55,965	Mary Throne	Lost
2022	15.82 / 100	▼11.72	30,686	Theresa Livingston	Lost

=== State legislature ===
Electoral performance

House
Election year	No. of overall seats won	+/–	Governor
1869 (Note: special election)	12 / 12	Steady	John Allen Campbell
1870	9 / 13	▼3	John Allen Campbell
1872	6 / 13	▼3	John Allen Campbell
1874	18 / 27	▲12	John Allen Campbell
1876	20 / 27	▲2	John Milton Thayer
1878	9 / 27	▼11	John Wesley Hoyt
1880	6 / 24	▼3	John Wesley Hoyt
1882	13 / 22	▲7	William Hale
1884	9 / 24	▼4	William Hale
1886	14 / 24	▲5	George W. Baxter
1888	6 / 23	▼8	Thomas Moonlight
1890	7 / 33	▲1	Francis E. Warren
1892	16 / 33	▲9	Amos W. Barber
1894	2 / 37	▼14	John Eugene Osborne
1896	11 / 38	▲9	William A. Richards
1898	3 / 38	▼8	William A. Richards
1900	2 / 38	▼1	DeForest Richards
1902	4 / 50	▲2	DeForest Richards
1904	3 / 50	▼1	Fenimore Chatterton
1906	5 / 50	▲2	Bryant Butler Brooks
1908	7 / 56	▲2	Bryant Butler Brooks
1910	25 / 56	▲18	Bryant Butler Brooks
1912	28 / 57	▲3	Joseph M. Carey
1914	15 / 57	▼13	Joseph M. Carey
1916	25 / 57	▲10	John B. Kendrick
1918	11 / 54	▼14	Frank L. Houx
1920	1 / 54	▼10	Robert D. Carey
1922	23 / 60	▲22	Robert D. Carey
1924	23 / 62	Steady	Frank Lucas
1926	17 / 62	▼5	Nellie Tayloe Ross
1928	11 / 62	▼6	Frank Emerson
1930	26 / 62	▲15	Frank Emerson
1932	42 / 62	▲16	Alonzo M. Clark
1934	38 / 56	▼4	Leslie A. Miller
1936	38 / 56	Steady	Leslie A. Miller
1938	19 / 56	▼19	Leslie A. Miller
1940	28 / 56	▲9	Nels H. Smith
1942	17 / 56	▼11	Nels H. Smith
1944	20 / 55	▲3	Lester C. Hunt
1946	12 / 56	▼7	Lester C. Hunt
1948	28 / 56	▲16	Lester C. Hunt
1950	17 / 56	▼11	Arthur G. Crane
1952	11 / 56	▼6	Frank A. Barrett
1954	24 / 56	▲13	Clifford Joy Rogers
1956	26 / 56	▲2	Milward Simpson
1958	30 / 56	▲4	Milward Simpson
1960	21 / 56	▼9	John J. Hickey
1962	19 / 56	▼2	Jack R. Gage
1964	34 / 61	▲15	Clifford Hansen
1966	27 / 61	▼7	Clifford Hansen
1968	16 / 61	▼11	Stanley K. Hathaway
1970	20 / 61	▲4	Stanley K. Hathaway
1972	17 / 62	▼3	Stanley K. Hathaway
1974	29 / 62	▲12	Stanley K. Hathaway
1976	29 / 62	Steady	Edgar Herschler
1978	20 / 62	▼9	Edgar Herschler
1980	23 / 62	▲3	Edgar Herschler
1982	25 / 62	▲2	Edgar Herschler
1984	18 / 64	▼7	Edgar Herschler
1986	20 / 64	▲2	Edgar Herschler
1988	21 / 64	▲1	Mike Sullivan
1990	22 / 64	▲1	Mike Sullivan
1992	19 / 60	▼3	Mike Sullivan
1994	13 / 60	▼6	Mike Sullivan
1996	17 / 60	▲4	Jim Geringer
1998	17 / 60	Steady	Jim Geringer
2000	14 / 60	▼3	Jim Geringer
2002	15 / 60	▲1	Jim Geringer
2004	14 / 60	▼1	Dave Freudenthal
2006	17 / 60	▲3	Dave Freudenthal
2008	19 / 60	▲2	Dave Freudenthal
2010	10 / 60	▼9	Dave Freudenthal
2012	8 / 60	▼2	Matt Mead
2014	9 / 60	▲1	Matt Mead
2016	9 / 60	Steady	Matt Mead
2018	9 / 60	Steady	Matt Mead
2020	7 / 60	▼2	Mark Gordon
2022	5 / 60	▼2	Mark Gordon
2024	6 / 60	▲1	Mark Gordon

Senate
Election year	No. of overall seats won	+/–	Governor
1869 (Note: special election)	9 / 9	Steady	John Allen Campbell
1870	5 / 9	▼4	John Allen Campbell
1872	4 / 9	▼1	John Allen Campbell
1874	11 / 13	▲7	John Allen Campbell
1876	9 / 13	▼2	John Milton Thayer
1878	8 / 13	▼1	John Wesley Hoyt
1880	7 / 12	▼1	John Wesley Hoyt
1882	8 / 12	▲1	William Hale
1884	8 / 12	Steady	William Hale
1886	3 / 12	▼5	George W. Baxter
1888	7 / 12	▲4	Thomas Moonlight
1890	3 / 16	▼4	Francis E. Warren
1892	5 / 16	▲2	Amos W. Barber
1894	4 / 18	▼1	John Eugene Osborne
1896	4 / 19	Steady	William A. Richards
1898	6 / 19	▲2	William A. Richards
1900	2 / 19	▼4	DeForest Richards
1902	2 / 23	Steady	DeForest Richards
1904	3 / 23	▲1	Fenimore Chatterton
1906	2 / 23	▼1	Bryant Butler Brooks
1908	3 / 27	▲1	Bryant Butler Brooks
1910	6 / 27	▲3	Bryant Butler Brooks
1912	8 / 27	▲2	Joseph M. Carey
1914	9 / 27	▲1	Joseph M. Carey
1916	11 / 27	▲2	John B. Kendrick
1918	10 / 27	▼1	Frank L. Houx
1920	3 / 25	▼7	Robert D. Carey
1922	5 / 25	▲2	Robert D. Carey
1924	11 / 27	▲6	Frank Lucas
1926	12 / 27	▲1	Nellie Tayloe Ross
1928	10 / 27	▼2	Frank Emerson
1930	6 / 27	▼4	Frank Emerson
1932	12 / 27	▲6	Alonzo M. Clark
1934	14 / 27	▲2	Leslie A. Miller
1936	16 / 27	▲2	Leslie A. Miller
1938	11 / 27	▼5	Leslie A. Miller
1940	11 / 27	Steady	Nels H. Smith
1942	10 / 27	▼1	Nels H. Smith
1944	6 / 27	▼4	Lester C. Hunt
1946	8 / 27	▲2	Lester C. Hunt
1948	9 / 27	▲1	Lester C. Hunt
1950	10 / 27	▲1	Arthur G. Crane
1952	6 / 27	▼4	Frank A. Barrett
1954	8 / 27	▲2	Clifford Joy Rogers
1956	11 / 27	▲3	Milward Simpson
1958	11 / 27	Steady	Milward Simpson
1960	10 / 27	▼1	John J. Hickey
1962	11 / 27	▲1	Jack R. Gage
1964	12 / 27	▲1	Clifford Hansen
1966	12 / 30	Steady	Clifford Hansen
1968	12 / 30	Steady	Stanley K. Hathaway
1970	11 / 30	▼1	Stanley K. Hathaway
1972	13 / 30	▲2	Stanley K. Hathaway
1974	15 / 30	▲2	Stanley K. Hathaway
1976	12 / 30	▼3	Edgar Herschler
1978	11 / 30	▼1	Edgar Herschler
1980	11 / 30	Steady	Edgar Herschler
1982	11 / 30	Steady	Edgar Herschler
1984	11 / 30	Steady	Edgar Herschler
1986	11 / 30	Steady	Edgar Herschler
1988	11 / 30	Steady	Mike Sullivan
1990	10 / 30	▼1	Mike Sullivan
1992	10 / 30	Steady	Mike Sullivan
1994	10 / 30	Steady	Mike Sullivan
1996	9 / 30	▼1	Jim Geringer
1998	9 / 30	Steady	Jim Geringer
2000	10 / 30	▲1	Jim Geringer
2002	10 / 30	Steady	Jim Geringer
2004	7 / 30	▼3	Dave Freudenthal
2006	7 / 30	Steady	Dave Freudenthal
2008	7 / 30	Steady	Dave Freudenthal
2010	4 / 30	▼3	Dave Freudenthal
2012	4 / 30	Steady	Matt Mead
2014	4 / 30	Steady	Matt Mead
2016	3 / 30	▼1	Matt Mead
2018	3 / 30	Steady	Matt Mead
2020	2 / 30	▼1	Mark Gordon
2020	2 / 30	Steady	Mark Gordon
2024	2 / 30	Steady	Mark Gordon

== See also ==
- Political party strength in Wyoming
- Wyoming Republican Party

== Works cited ==
- Trachsel, Herman (1959). "The 1958 Election in Wyoming". The Western Political Quarterly. 12 (1). University of Utah: 363–66. doi:10.2307/444064. JSTOR 444064.
- Trachsel, Herman (1961). "The 1960 Election in Wyoming". The Western Political Quarterly. 14 (1). University of Utah: 383–85. doi:10.2307/443862. JSTOR 443862.
