= A. J. Rosier =

American lawyer and politician (1880–1932)

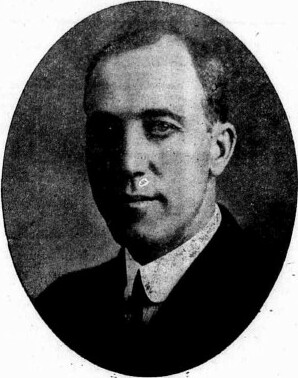
- Rosier in 1920

Member of the Wyoming Senate for Carbon County
- In office January 1927 – April 15, 1932

Prosecuting Attorney for Carbon County
- In office November 1916 – November 1920
- Preceded by: ?
- Succeeded by: Revelle McMicken

Personal details
- Born: Arthur John Rosier; October 31, 1880 West Union, Minnesota, U.S.
- Died: April 15, 1932 (aged 51) Rawlins, Wyoming, U.S.
- Resting place: Rawlins Cemetery
- Party: Republican
- Spouse: Grace G. Arthaud (m. 1914)
- Children: 3
- Education: University of South Dakota; University of Minnesota

Arthur John Rosier (October 31, 1880 – April 15, 1932) was an American lawyer and politician who served in the Wyoming Senate from 1927 until his murder in 1932. Rosier was a member of the Republican Party and represented Carbon County in the legislature. He was also a prominent lawyer in Montana and Wyoming, and took part in several noteworthy trials. Prior to his political career, Rosier was the prosecuting attorney for Carbon County from 1916 until 1920.

On April 15, 1932, Rosier was shot and killed by Thomas Lacey, a disgruntled prospective client, after he refused to file a lawsuit for Lacey.

== Early life and education ==
Arthur John Rosier was born in West Union, Minnesota, on October 31, 1880. He was the third of five children of wealthy farmer and inventor Thomas R. Rosier, and Helen M. Wolcott, both of whom were New York residents who had moved to Minnesota. Arthur Rosier was raised in Sioux Falls, South Dakota, where he attended the local public school. He spent three years studying at the University of South Dakota before attending the University of Minnesota Law School, where he spent another three years and graduated in 1906. On June 6, 1906, Rosier was admitted to the State Bar of Montana and he opened a law practice in the city of Butte the following month.

== Legal career ==
=== Montana ===
Rosier began his law career in Montana, where he was involved in several prominent cases. Between 1909 and 1911, he represented Edward Moxley, a pawnbroker who having inadvertently bought and re-sold a set of stolen tools, was arrested for receiving and selling stolen property. Moxley was convicted and sentenced to six months in jail but Rosier appealed the decision, arguing the evidence provided was insufficient to prove Moxley's guilt. The appeal reached the Montana Supreme Court, which agreed with Rosier and ordered a re-trial. The supreme court's decision set case law precedent that when a defendant in Montana is accused of receiving specific stolen goods, evidence that the defendant subsequently received other stolen goods is not admissible as evidence to prove the defendant had knowledge that the initial goods were stolen. The case was later dismissed due to a lack of new evidence.

In 1910, Rosier represented Anna Wilkes Barnes in a personal injury lawsuit against a man whose automobile allegedly spooked the horse that was leading Barnes's carriage. Barnes was ejected from the carriage and sought $5,000 in the lawsuit for the serious injuries she sustained. At trial, a jury found the automobile owner was not negligent and dismissed the case. The trial drew significant media coverage and the result was called a "victory for [the] automobile". Rosier took part in other civil and criminal trials.

While in Montana, Rosier became involved in the oil and mining industries, working as the manager of the Trail Creek Coal Company in 1907 and as secretary of the Summit Gold and Silver Mining Company in 1910. He was also active in local Republican Party politics, serving as an alternate delegate to the 1908 Montana Republican Party state convention. In 1910, he joined several other local lawyers endorsing George M. Bourquin, a former state judge, for a vacancy on the United States District Court for the District of Montana. Bourquin was nominated for the position two years later by President William Howard Taft and subsequently confirmed by the United States Senate.

=== Wyoming ===
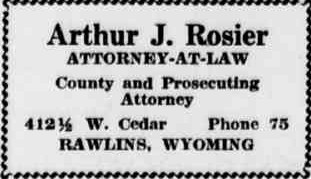
Advertisement for Rosier's law practice, 1920

Rosier left Montana in September 1911 and moved to Rawlins, Wyoming. He was admitted to the Wyoming State Bar on October 30, 1911, and opened a law office in Rawlins. During this period, he represented several regional banks, including the First State Bank of Baggs and the Stock Growers Bank in Saratoga. In 1914, Rosier was elected prosecuting attorney for Carbon County, and was re-elected in 1916 and 1918. According to writer Ichabod Sargent Bartlett, Rosier was well-regarded in the role of prosecuting attorney:

He always prepares his cases with great thoroughness and care, is clear in his reasoning, logical in his deductions and his arguments are characterized by great strength ... and he possesses a law library of rare value. His office equipment is most comprehensive and in preparing a case for the court he looks up every authority bearing upon the question and therefore enters the court well qualified for defense as well as for attack.

In 1917 and 1918, Rosier was the prosecutor during the highly publicized murder trial of John Leibig, a naturalized German-American rancher who was accused of shooting his neighbor during a land dispute. After a week-long trial in March 1918, a jury found Leibig not guilty of murder, agreeing with his argument the victim had accidentally shot himself while picking up Leibig's shotgun. Despite this, after making a series of statements in support of the German Empire, Leibig was tried and convicted in federal court for violating the Espionage and Sedition Acts.

Rosier represented the Carbon County Board of Commissioners in a 1918 lawsuit against the Union Pacific Railroad. During his tenure, Rosier strongly prosecuted bootleggers and gamblers, leading to him having "many bitter enemies". As a result of a strong campaign against him, Rosier was defeated in his 1920 re-election bid by Democratic nominee Revelle McMicken.

In January 1921, Rosier was elected a member of the Wyoming State Bar Association and in 1928, he was included in The Bar Register, an annual publication of the most prominent lawyers in the United States. He also continued his business career in Wyoming, sitting on the board of directors of the Alameda Oil Company and serving as the agent-in-charge of the Shoshoni Development Company.

== Political career ==
Rosier was a candidate for the Wyoming Senate in the 1926 Wyoming state elections as a member of the Republican Party to represent Carbon County. He defeated Henry Perret in the Republican primary, receiving 1,145 votes to Perret's 640. There was no Democratic opponent so Rosier won the general election unopposed. His four-year term began in January 1927.

In the 1927 legislative session, Rosier served on the Judiciary, Education, County Affairs, Mines, Engrossment, and Public Utilities committees. Among his first acts in the legislature was the filing of a bill that proposed transferring a tract of land belonging to the Wyoming State Penitentiary to the city of Rawlins; the bill passed unanimously through both the House of Representatives and the Senate. He also introduced an amendment to a divorce-residency bill that had staunch opposition from the Woman's Christian Temperance Union; his proposed amendment would disqualify a divorce from proceeding if it was determined the couple moved to Wyoming for the sole purpose of getting a divorce.

Additionally, Rosier also led arguments against a bill which would define and outlaw fraudulent conveyances, arguing the proposed change would lead to women being charged of a crime when husbands transferred land to their wives prior to becoming insolvent. Due to his arguments, action on the conveyances bill was indefinitely postponed. A few days later, during a debate on a bank guarantee fund bill, Rosier questioned whether it would be "constitutional for the state to protect private institutions"; this bill was also defeated.

In the 1929 legislative session, Rosier served on the Judiciary, Railroad, Elections, Public Highways, Public Accounts, and Public Utilities committees. He was also a member of the temporary Credentials Committee and was elected vice president of the Senate. Rosier introduced two noteworthy bills in 1929. One bill would allow mechanics, engineers, and other laborers to put a mechanic's lien on personal property. The other bill proposed the allocation of $150,000 in state funds to the Wyoming State Penitentiary for the construction of a new cell block and other improvements.

During this session, Rosier was also part of an investigatory committee that investigated the state department of law enforcement over alleged crimes, financial mismanagement, and a "lack of diligence and honesty". The investigation centered on state commissioner of law enforcement William C. Irving, who was accused of corruption and prohibition law violations for protecting speakeasies which paid a monthly bribe. Though the committee found no connection between Irving and the accusations, Irving and a number of co-conspirators were indicted, tried, and found guilty by a federal court, and he was sentenced to eighteen months in prison.

Rosier was re-elected unopposed in the 1930 state election. In the 1931 legislative session, he was a member of the Steering Committee. Along with Democratic senator Bayard Wilson, he co-sponsored a bipartisan bill that would amend the state highway budget. The amendment would allocate one-fourth of the $2.8 million raised through the sale of voter-approved highway bonds to the counties for the construction and improvement of county highways that were excluded from the state-federal highway system.

In February 1931, at the end of the short legislative session, Governor of Wyoming Frank Emerson died and secretary of state Alonzo M. Clark succeeded him. Because the Senate was going into recess and the President of the Senate is the next-in-line of succession, this made the normally uncontroversial election of President ad interim significantly more important than usual. Rosier was nominated as a candidate for President ad interim but was defeated by Earl Wright by one vote.

=== Murder ===
On April 15, 1932, while Rosier was inside the Rawlins National Bank, he was shot and killed by Thomas Lacey, a local gambler. Lacey had followed Rosier into the bank just after 1 p.m. and shot him once in the back with an automatic revolver, piercing his heart and instantly killing him. After bank employees raised their hands in surrender, Lacey responded: "This is not a stickup. I am just getting even with a fellow." He then fled the bank and shot himself in the head, dying at the local hospital a few hours later. According to the police investigation, Lacey had asked Rosier to file a lawsuit against the authorities who had arrested and convicted him on gambling charges; Rosier had refused. His funeral service was held at the local Masonic Temple on April 17, 1932, and he was buried in Rawlins Cemetery.

== Personal life ==
On June 15, 1914, Rosier married Grace G. Arthaud of Burwell, Nebraska, in Denver. They had three children together. Kraft Hall, the Rosier family home in Rawlins, remained in the family's possession until the 1970s and is a contributing structure to the Downtown Rawlins Historic District.

Rosier was a high-ranking Freemason and was a member of the Shriners, the Benevolent and Protective Order of Elks, and the Improved Order of Red Men. In 1923, he was president of the local Lions Club.
