= 1930 Wyoming state elections =

A general election was held in the U.S. state of Wyoming on Tuesday, November 4, 1930. All of the state's executive officers—the Governor, Secretary of State, Auditor, Treasurer, and Superintendent of Public Instruction—were up for election. Republicans narrowly held onto the Governor's office and won every other state office.

== Governor ==
Incumbent Republican Governor Frank Emerson ran for re-election to a second term. After beating back a challenge in the Republican primary from State Treasurer William H. Edelman, he faced State Senator Leslie A. Miller in the general election. As was the case in 1926, Emerson faced a close race, and only narrowly defeated Miller to win re-election. However, Emerson would die shortly after being sworn into his second term, triggering a special election in 1932.

1930 Wyoming gubernatorial election
Party	Candidate	Votes	%	±%
Republican	Frank C. Emerson (inc.)	38,058	50.58%	−0.32%
Democratic	Leslie A. Miller	37,188	49.42%	0.47%
Majority		870	1.16%	−0.79%
Turnout		75,246	100.00%	
Republican hold				

== Secretary of State ==
Incumbent Republican Secretary of State Alonzo M. Clark ran for re-election to a second term. After defeating two challengers in the Republican primary—State Representative A. D. Persson and former State Senator H. S. Kirk—he advanced to the general election, where he was opposed by O. O. Davis, the editor of the Green River Star. Clark overwhelmingly defeated Davis to win re-election. Just weeks into Clark's second term, however, Governor Emerson would die, elevating Clark as acting governor—though he continued to serve as Secretary of State.

=== Democratic primary ===
==== Candidates ====
- O. O. Davis, editor of the Green River Star

==== Results ====
Democratic Party primary results
Party	Candidate	Votes	%
Democratic	O. O. Davis	9,061	100.00%
Total votes		9,061	100.00%

=== Republican primary ===
==== Candidates ====
- Alonzo M. Clark, incumbent Secretary of State
- A. D. Persson, State Representative
- H. S. Kirk, former State Senator

==== Results ====
Republican Primary results
Party	Candidate	Votes	%
Republican	Alonzo M. Clark (inc.)	21,158	55.66%
Republican	A. D. Persson	11,289	29.70%
Republican	H. S. Kirk	5,569	14.65%
Total votes		38,016	100.00%

=== General election ===
==== Results ====
1930 Wyoming Secretary of State election
Party	Candidate	Votes	%	±%
Republican	Alonzo M. Clark (inc.)	41,643	60.44%	+7.22%
Democratic	O. O. Davis	27,268	39.56%	−7.22%
Majority		14,385	20.88%	+14.44%
Turnout		64,325		
Republican hold				

== Auditor ==
State Auditor Vincent Carter was elected to Congress in 1928, and Governor Frank Emerson appointed Roscoe Alcorn, the President the Wyoming Press Association and a former State Representative, as Carter's replacement. Alcorn ran for re-election in 1930, and was opposed by accountant C. H. Reimerth in the Republican primary. Alcorn defeated Reimerth in a landslide and advanced to the general election. No Democratic candidate filed to oppose Alcorn, but A. E. Wilde received enough write-in votes to win the party's nomination. Wilde, however, declined the nomination. Accordingly, the Wyoming Democratic Party named June J. Creswell, the former Converse County Treasurer, as its nominee. Alcorn was re-elected over Creswell in a landslide.

=== Democratic primary ===
No Democratic candidates filed for State Auditor. However, because A. E. Wilde received the most write-in votes for the race, he was entitled to the nomination under state law, which he declined. The Democratic Party then named June J. Creswell, the former Converse County Treasurer, as Wilde's replacement on the ballot.

=== Republican primary ===
==== Candidates ====
- Roscoe Alcorn, incumbent State Auditor
- C. H. Reimerth, accountant

==== Results ====
Republican Primary results
Party	Candidate	Votes	%
Republican	Roscoe Alcorn (inc.)	22,126	60.40%
Republican	C. H. Reimerth	14,508	39.60%
Total votes		36,634	100.00

=== General election ===
==== Results ====
1930 Wyoming Auditor election
Party	Candidate	Votes	%	±%
Republican	Roscoe Alcorn (inc.)	42,126	61.84%	+2.07%
Democratic	June J. Creswell	26,012	38.16%	−2.07%
Majority		16,134	23.67%	+4.15%
Turnout		68,158		
Republican hold				

== Treasurer ==
Incumbent State Treasurer William H. Edelman opted to challenge Governor Frank Emerson for re-election rather than seeking a second term, creating an open seat. Harry R. Weston, a banker, won the Republican primary over former Cheyenne Mayor Robert N. LaFontaine, and then faced former State Representative Bert Waddell in the general election. Weston defeated Waddell by a wide margin to win his first (and only) term as Treasurer.

=== Democratic primary ===
==== Candidates ====
- Bert Waddell, former State Representative

==== Results ====
Democratic Party primary results
Party	Candidate	Votes	%
Democratic	Bert Waddell	8,393	100.00%
Total votes		8,393	100.00%

=== Republican primary ===
==== Candidates ====
- Harry R. Weston, banker
- Robert N. LaFontaine, former Mayor of Cheyenne

==== Results ====
Republican Primary results
Party	Candidate	Votes	%
Republican	Harry R. Weston	22,968	63.39%
Republican	Robert N. LaFontaine	13,267	36.61%
Total votes		36,235	100.00

=== General election ===
==== Results ====
1930 Wyoming Treasurer election
Party	Candidate	Votes	%	±%
Republican	Harry R. Weston	39,939	59.19%	+2.88%
Democratic	Bert Waddell	27,534	40.81%	−2.88%
Majority		12,405	18.39%	+5.76%
Turnout		67,473		
Republican hold				

== Superintendent of Public Instruction ==
Incumbent Republican Superintendent of Public Instruction Katharine A. Morton ran for re-election to a fourth term. She faced Nelle O'Donnell in the Republican primary, which, despite Morton's longtime popularity, was the closest primary in the state. No Democratic candidates originally filed to oppose Morton, but L. C. Tidball, the former state commissioner of education, received enough write-in votes to win the nomination. Tidball declined the spot, however, citing his belief that politics shouldn't be mixed with schools. Accordingly, the state party named Margaret S. "Anna" Preston, the widow of former state Attorney General Douglas Preston, as its nominee. Despite Morton's long history of electoral landslides and the Democratic Party's poor organization in the race, the campaign between Morton and Preston was quite close. Morton ultimately only won re-election by just 1,382 votes, winning her fourth and final term in office.

=== Democratic primary ===
==== Candidates ====
No Democratic candidates filed for State Superintendent of Public Instruction. However, because L. C. Tidball received the most write-in votes for the race, he was entitled to the nomination under state law, which he declined. The Democratic Party then named Anna Preston as Tidball's replacement on the ballot.

=== Republican primary ===
==== Candidates ====
- Katharine A. Morton, incumbent Superintendent of Instruction
- Nelle O'Donnell

==== Results ====
Republican Party primary results
Party	Candidate	Votes	%
Republican	Katharine Morton (inc.)	21,897	55.08
Republican	Nelle O'Donnell	17,857	44.92
Total votes		39,754	100.00

=== General election ===
==== Results ====
1930 Wyoming Superintendent of Public Instruction election
Party	Candidate	Votes	%	±%
Republican	Katharine A. Morton (inc.)	36,304	50.97%	−12.14%
Democratic	Anna S. Preston	34,922	49.03%	+12.14%
Majority		1,382	1.94%	−24.28%
Turnout		71,226		
Republican hold				
