= 1926 Wyoming state elections =

A general election was held in the U.S. state of Wyoming on November 2, 1926. All of the state's executive officers—the Governor, Secretary of State, Auditor, Treasurer, and Superintendent of Public Instruction—were up for election. Republicans narrowly picked up the governorship and solidified their control on the other statewide offices, increasing their margin of victory in each race.

== Governor ==
Incumbent Democratic Governor Nellie Tayloe Ross ran for re-election to a second term. She was narrowly defeated for re-election by Republican Frank Emerson, the Wyoming State Engineer.

1926 Wyoming gubernatorial election
Party	Candidate	Votes	%	±%
Republican	Frank C. Emerson	35,651	50.90%	+6.02%
Democratic	Nellie Tayloe Ross (inc.)	34,286	48.95%	−6.17%
Radical Party	William B. Guthrie	104	0.15%	+0.15%
Majority		1,365	1.95%	−8.29%
Turnout		70,041	100.00%	
Republican gain from Democratic				

== Secretary of State ==
Incumbent Republican Secretary of State Frank E. Lucas, who briefly served as acting governor following the death of William B. Ross, opted to run for Governor rather than seek re-election. Former Campbell County Clerk Alonzo M. Clark defeated former State Senator John Stansbury for the Republican nomination, while businessman W. S. Kimball won the Democratic nomination unopposed. In the general election, Clark defeated Kimball by a decisive margin to win his first term as Secretary of State.

=== Democratic primary ===
==== Candidates ====
- W. S. Kimball, businessman

==== Results ====
Democratic Party primary results
Party	Candidate	Votes	%
Democratic	W. S. Kimball	11,549	100.00%
Total votes		11,549	100.00%

=== Republican primary ===
==== Candidates ====
- Alonzo M. Clark, former Campbell County Clerk
- John Stansbury, former State Senator
- W. K. Mylar

==== Results ====
Republican Primary results
Party	Candidate	Votes	%
Republican	Alonzo M. Clark	11,922	42.63%
Republican	John Stansbury	9,746	34.85%
Republican	W. K. Mylar	6,298	22.52%
Total votes		27,966	100.00%

=== General election ===
==== Results ====
1926 Wyoming Secretary of State election
Party	Candidate	Votes	%	±%
Republican	Alonzo M. Clark	34,234	53.22%	−0.13%
Democratic	W. S. Kimball	30,091	46.78%	+0.13%
Majority		4,143	6.44%	−0.27%
Turnout		64,325		
Republican hold				

== Auditor ==
Incumbent Republican State Auditor Vincent Carter, first elected in 1922, ran for re-election to his second term. He faced newspaper editor Joe U. Allard, the Democratic nominee, in the general election. Despite the closeness of several other statewide races, Carter was able to improve on his margin of victory and defeated Allard in a landslide. He would not serve out his full term, however, following his election to Congress in 1928.

=== Democratic primary ===
==== Candidates ====
- Joe U. Allard, Evanston newspaper editor
- LeRoy Joyce, Deputy State Examiner

==== Results ====
Democratic Party primary results
Party	Candidate	Votes	%
Democratic	Joe U. Allard	6,230	54.22%
Democratic	LeRoy Joyce	5,260	45.78%
Total votes		11,490	100.00%

=== Republican primary ===
==== Candidates ====
- Vincent Carter, incumbent State Auditor

==== Results ====
Republican Primary results
Party	Candidate	Votes	%
Republican	Vincent Carter	25,424	100.00%
Total votes		25,424	100.00

=== General election ===
==== Results ====
1926 Wyoming Auditor election
Party	Candidate	Votes	%	±%
Republican	Vincent Carter (inc.)	37,543	59.76%	+7.00%
Democratic	Joe U. Allard	25,278	40.24%	−7.00%
Majority		12,265	19.52%	+14.01%
Turnout		62,821		
Republican hold				

== Treasurer ==
Incumbent Republican State Treasurer John M. Snyder declined to seek re-election to a second term. To replace him, former State Representative William H. Edelman, the Republican nominee, ran against C. H. McWinnie, the State Public Lands Commissioner and the Democratic nominee. Though Snyder's margin of victory in 1922 was close, Edelman ultimately defeated McWinnie by a wide margin.

=== Democratic primary ===
==== Candidates ====
- C. H. McWinnie, State Public Lands Commissioner

==== Results ====
Democratic Party primary results
Party	Candidate	Votes	%
Democratic	C. H. McWinnie	11,000	100.00%
Total votes		11,000	100.00%

=== Republican primary ===
==== Candidates ====
- William H. Edelman, former State Representative

==== Results ====
Republican Primary results
Party	Candidate	Votes	%
Republican	William H. Edelman	25,015	100.00%
Total votes		25,015	100.00

=== General election ===
==== Results ====
1926 Wyoming Treasurer election
Party	Candidate	Votes	%	±%
Republican	William H. Edelman	35,255	56.31%	+3.46%
Democratic	C. H. McWinnie	27,351	43.69%	−3.46%
Majority		7,904	12.62%	+6.91%
Turnout		62,606		
Republican hold				

== Superintendent of Public Instruction ==
Incumbent Republican Superintendent of Public Instruction Katharine A. Morton ran for re-election to a third term. She was opposed by Cecilia H. Hendricks, the Democratic nominee. Morton easily dispatched Hendricks to win re-election in a landslide, and in so doing, won the highest percentage of the vote of any candidate in the state in 1926.

=== Democratic primary ===
==== Candidates ====
- Cecilia H. Hendricks

==== Results ====
Democratic Party primary results
Party	Candidate	Votes	%
Democratic	Cecilia H. Hendricks	10,939	100.00
Total votes		10,939	100.00

=== Republican primary ===
==== Candidates ====
- Katharine A. Morton, incumbent Superintendent of Instruction

==== Results ====
Republican Party primary results
Party	Candidate	Votes	%
Republican	Katharine Morton (inc.)	26,656	100.00
Total votes		26,656	100.00

=== General election ===
==== Results ====
1926 Wyoming Superintendent of Public Instruction election
Party	Candidate	Votes	%	±%
Republican	Katharine A. Morton (inc.)	40,614	63.11%	+5.95%
Democratic	Cecilia H. Hendricks	23,740	36.89%	+0.44%
Majority		16,874	26.22%	+11.89%
Turnout		64,354		
Republican hold				
