= Jacob Berner =

Jacob Berner may refer to:

- Jacob Berner (politician) (1865–1931), American politician
- Jacob Berner (footballer) (1900–1941), Norwegian footballer
