= E. J. Sullivan (politician) =

American businessman, lawyer, and politician (1874–1956)

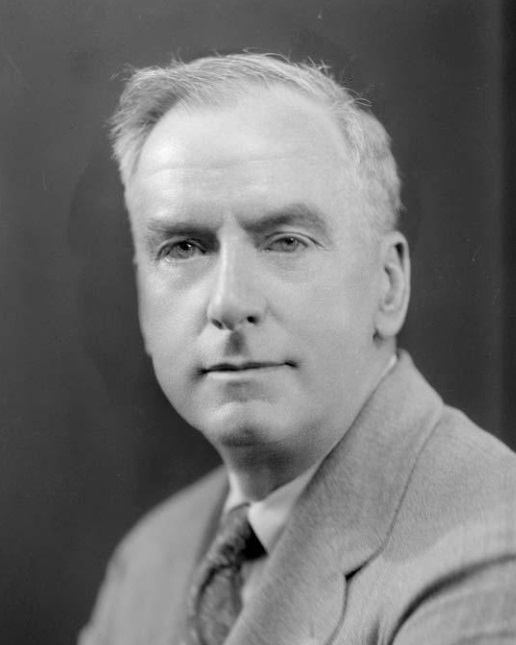
- Portrait, 1930

14th Speaker of the Wyoming House of Representatives
- In office January 14, 1919 – January 3, 1921
- Preceded by: W. K. Jones
- Succeeded by: Lewis R. Ewart

Member of the Wyoming House of Representatives from Big Horn County
- In office January 14, 1919 – January 3, 1921 Serving with R. C. May and A. S. Mercer Jr.
- Preceded by: Joseph H. Neville
- Succeeded by: Joseph H. Neville
- In office January 14, 1913 – January 4, 1915 Serving with H. B. Gates and L. A. Thorley
- Preceded by: Boies C. Hart
- Succeeded by: John H. Hinckley

Personal details
- Born: Eugene James Sullivan; November 22, 1874 Dover, New Hampshire, U.S.
- Died: September 25, 1956 (aged 81) Boston, Massachusetts, U.S.
- Political party: Republican
- Spouse: Susie Keefer (m. 1903; died 1925)
- Education: University of Nebraska (LLB)
- Occupation: Businessperson; lawyer; politician

Eugene James Sullivan (November 22, 1874 – September 25, 1956) was an American businessman, lawyer and Republican Party politician. He served two non-consecutive terms in the Wyoming House of Representatives, the second as the chamber's speaker. He was his party's nominee in the 1924 Wyoming gubernatorial special election, which was held following the death of William B. Ross. Sullivan lost to Ross's widow, Nellie Tayloe Ross.

Wyoming House of Representatives
Preceded by W. K. Jones	Speaker of the Wyoming House of Representatives; 1919–1921	Succeeded by Lewis R. Ewart
Party political offices
Preceded by John W. Hay	Republican nominee for Governor of Wyoming; 1924 (special)	Succeeded by Frank Emerson
