= 1934 Wyoming gubernatorial election =

- November 6, 1934
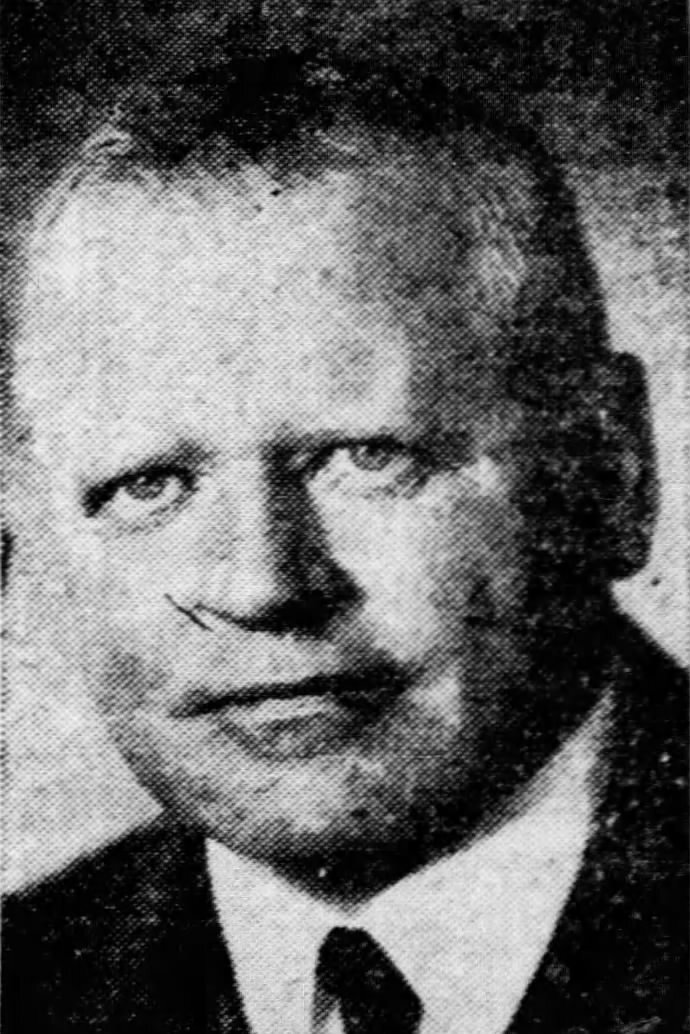

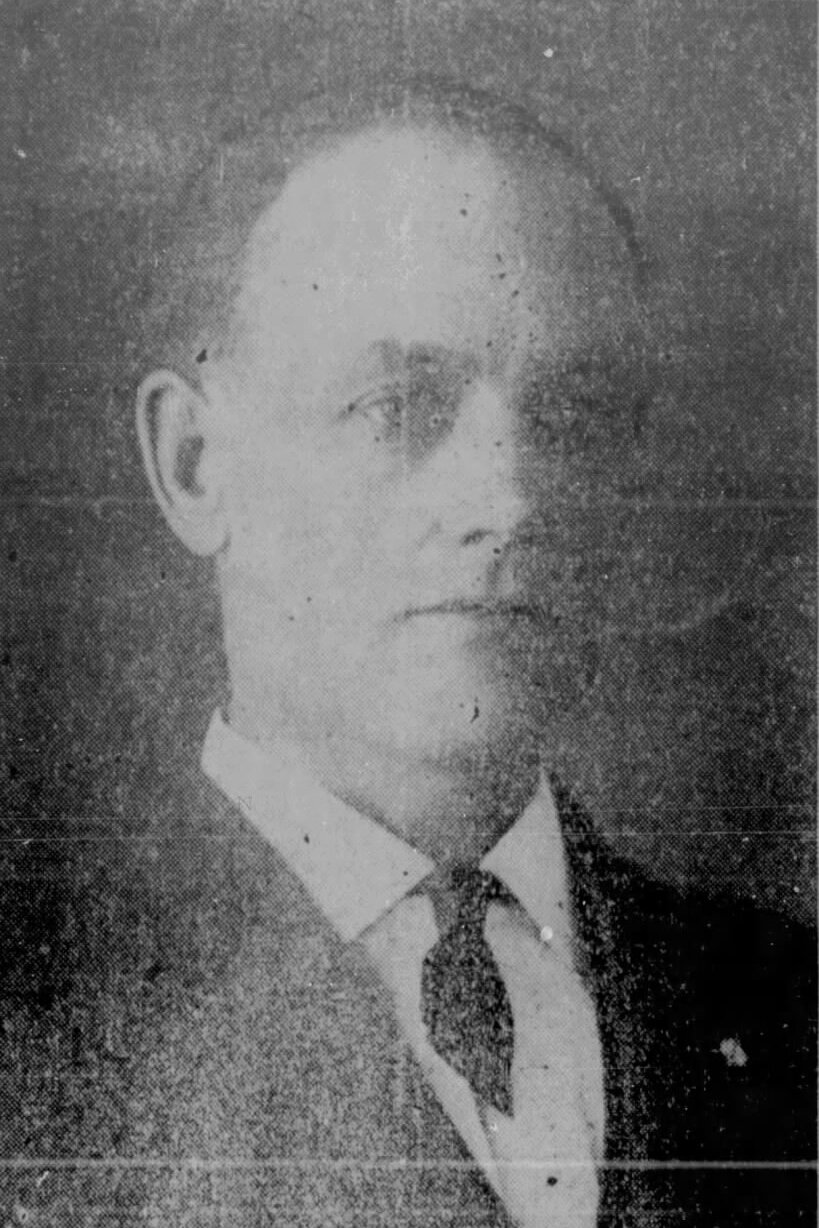
Nominee	Leslie A. Miller	Alonzo M. Clark
Party	Democratic	Republican
Popular vote	54,305	38,792
Percentage	57.91%	41.36%
- County results Miller: 50–60% 60–70% Clark: 40–50% 50–60% 60–70%
Governor before election
Leslie A. Miller
Democratic
Elected Governor
Leslie A. Miller
Democratic

The 1934 Wyoming gubernatorial election took place on November 6, 1934. Incumbent Democratic Governor Leslie A. Miller ran for re-election to his second term, and his first full term, following his initial election in the 1932 special election. Miller faced Republican Alonzo M. Clark, his predecessor as governor, in the general election. Despite the closeness of Miller's first election, he took advantage of the nationwide Democratic landslide and easily defeated Clark.

== Democratic primary ==
=== Candidates ===
- Leslie A. Miller, incumbent Governor
- Tom D. O'Neil, former state highway commissioner

=== Results ===
Democratic primary
Party	Candidate	Votes	%
Democratic	Leslie A. Miller (inc.)	19,280	61.36%
Democratic	T. D. O'Neil	12,142	38.64%
Total votes		31,422	100.00%

== Republican primary ==
=== Candidates ===
- Alonzo M. Clark, former Governor of Wyoming
- Nels H. Smith, former state highway commissioner, former State Representative
- John A. Whiting, Wyoming State Engineer
- Frank E. Lucas, former Governor of Wyoming

=== Results ===
Republican primary
Party	Candidate	Votes	%
Republican	Alonzo M. Clark	12,974	37.62%
Republican	Nels Smith	10,477	30.38%
Republican	John A. Whiting	6,467	18.75%
Republican	Frank E. Lucas	4,571	13.25%
Total votes		34,489	100.00%

== Results ==
1934 Wyoming gubernatorial election
Party	Candidate	Votes	%	±%
Democratic	Leslie A. Miller (inc.)	54,305	57.91%	+7.06%
Republican	Alonzo M. Clark	38,792	41.36%	−5.85%
Socialist	Louis Sky	527	0.56%	−1.18%
Communist	Merton Willer	156	0.17%	−0.02%
Majority		15,513	16.54%	+12.91%
Turnout		93,780		
Democratic hold				
