= Herman F. Krueger =

American politician

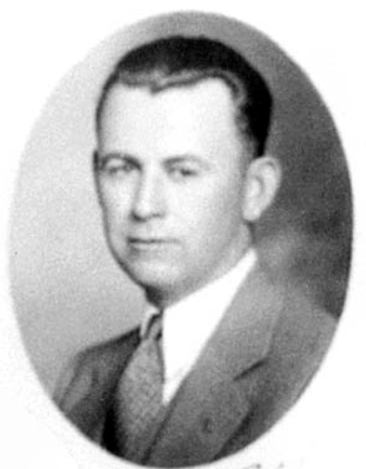

Speaker of the Wyoming House of Representatives
- In office January 12, 1937 – 1939
- Preceded by: Henry D. Watenpaugh
- Succeeded by: Herbert B. Fowler

Speaker of the Wyoming House of Representatives
- In office 1931–1939
- In office 1941–1943

Personal details
- Born: Herman Fred Krueger; April 5, 1894 Bern, Kansas, U.S.
- Died: August 19, 1991 (aged 97) Powell, Wyoming, U.S.
- Resting place: Crown Hill Cemetery, Powell, Wyoming, U.S.
- Party: Democratic
- Spouse: Celia Gordon
- Parents: Otto Frederick Krueger (father); Virginia F. Harvey (mother)
- Education: Peru State College

Military service
- Allegiance: United States
- Branch/service: Aviation Section
- Years of service: 1917-1918
- Awards: Italian War Cross; World War I Victory Medal

Herman Fred Krueger (April 5, 1894 – August 19, 1991) was an American politician and aviator who served in the Wyoming House of Representatives and as the Speaker of the House as a Democrat.

== Life ==
Herman Fred Krueger was born in Bern, Kansas on April 5, 1894 to German immigrants Otto Frederick Krueger and Virginia F. Harvey. He attended public schools in Nebraska and went to Peru State College. During World War I, he joined the U.S. Army's aviation section and fought over Italy and Austria, for which he received the Italian War Cross. After the war he returned to his family's home in Kansas, but moved to Wyoming in 1920. In 1925, he married Celia Gordon in Deer Lodge, Montana.

Krueger was elected to the state house to represent as one of Park County's representatives, served until 1939, and was later elected to another term from 1941 to 1943. In the 1936 house elections the Democratic Party retained control over the house and on January 12, 1937 he was elected as Speaker of the House with 38 votes against the Republican nominee's, Max Russell, 18 votes.

== Death ==
On August 19, 1991, he died at his home in Powell, Wyoming. At the time of his death, he was the last pilot from World War I in Wyoming.
