= Douglas A. Preston =

American attorney and politician

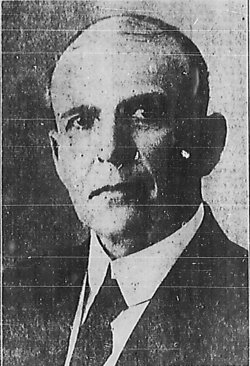

Member of the Wyoming Senate
- In office 1929 – October 20, 1929

6th Attorney General of Wyoming
- In office 1911–1919
- Governor: Joseph M. Carey; John B. Kendrick; Frank L. Houx
- Preceded by: W.E. Mullen
- Succeeded by: William L. Walls

Member of the Wyoming House of Representatives
- In office 1903–1905

Personal details
- Born: Douglas Arnold Preston; December 19, 1858 Olney, Illinois, U.S.
- Died: October 20, 1929 (aged 70) Rock Springs, Wyoming, U.S.
- Party: Democratic
- Spouse: Margaret S. "Anna" Preston
- Children: 2
- Parents: Finney D. Preston (father); Phoebe Mundy (mother)

Douglas Arnold Preston (December 19, 1858 – October 20, 1929) was an American attorney and politician who served as the 6th Attorney General of Wyoming from 1911 to 1919 as a member of the Democratic Party. He also served as a member of the Wyoming House of Representatives from 1903 to 1905 and as a member of the Wyoming Senate in 1929 until his death.

== Early life ==
Douglas Arnold Preston was born on December 19, 1858, in Olney, Illinois, to Finney D. Preston and Phoebe Mundy. He was admitted to the Illinois bar in 1878 and practiced law in Illinois courts until 1887, when he relocated to Cheyenne, Wyoming Territory.

In 1887, Preston established a law office in Rawlins in partnership with John R. Dixon. The following year, he moved to Lander, where he continued his legal practice. In 1895, he settled in Rock Springs, which became his long-term residence and base for his legal and political career.

== Career ==
From 1880 to 1884, Douglas A. Preston served as the prosecuting attorney for Richland County, Illinois. In 1889, he was selected as one of the Democratic delegates to the Wyoming Constitutional Convention, tasked with drafting the state's constitution for submission to the U.S. government for statehood. From 1903 to 1905, Preston served in the Wyoming House of Representatives. In 1911, Governor Joseph M. Carey appointed him as Attorney General of Wyoming, and he was reappointed by Governor John B. Kendrick in 1915.

In 1928, Preston was elected to the Wyoming Senate. However, on October 8, 1929, he was involved in a car crash that left him with four broken ribs and a severe skull fracture. He died on October 21, 1929, in a hospital in Rock Springs, Wyoming. In the 1930 Wyoming state elections, his widow, Anna Preston, was nominated as the Democratic candidate for Wyoming Superintendent of Public Instruction.
