= 1922 Wyoming gubernatorial election =

- November 7, 1922
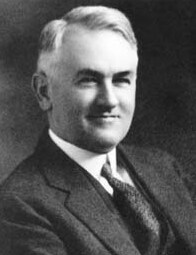

Nominee	William B. Ross	John W. Hay
Party	Democratic	Republican
Popular vote	31,110	30,387
Percentage	50.59%	49.41%
- County results Ross: 50–60% 60–70% Hay: 50–60% 60–70% 70–80%
Governor before election
Robert D. Carey
Republican
Elected Governor
William B. Ross
Democratic

The 1922 Wyoming gubernatorial election took place on November 7, 1922. Incumbent Republican Governor Robert D. Carey ran for re-election, but was narrowly defeated for renomination by banker John W. Hay. In the Democratic primary, William B. Ross, a 1918 candidate for Governor and the former Laramie County Attorney, defeated former State Representative George Kindler and Frank McDowell. The contest between Ross and Hay was close, with Ross narrowly beating out Hay, 51% to 49%, with a margin of just 723 votes. However, Ross would not end up serving a full term as Governor; he died in October 1924 and was eventually succeeded by his wife, Nellie Tayloe Ross.

== Democratic primary ==
=== Candidates ===
- William B. Ross, attorney, 1910 Democratic nominee for Congress, former Laramie County Attorney
- George E. Kindler, former State Representative from Park County
- Frank McDowell

=== Results ===
Wyoming Democratic Primary, 1922
Party	Candidate	Votes	%
Democratic	William B. Ross	6,230	49.56%
Democratic	George E. Kindler	4,972	39.55%
Democratic	Frank C. McDowell	1,370	10.90%
Total votes		12,572	100%

== Republican primary ==
=== Candidates ===
- John W. Hay, banker
- Robert D. Carey, incumbent Governor

=== Results ===
Wyoming Republican Primary, 1922
Party	Candidate	Votes	%
Republican	John W. Hay	16,110	50.70%
Republican	Robert D. Carey (inc.)	15,667	49.30%
Total votes		31,777	100%

== Results ==
1922 Wyoming gubernatorial election
Party	Candidate	Votes	%	±%
Democratic	William B. Ross	31,110	50.59%	+6.69%
Republican	John W. Hay	30,387	49.41%	−6.69%
Majority		723	1.18%	−11.03%
Turnout		61,497		
Democratic gain from Republican				
