= Jacob Berner (footballer) =

Norwegian footballer (1900-1941)

Jacob "Jokko" Berner (8 January 1900 – 6 August 1941) was a Norwegian footballer.

He was born in Kristiania. He played football for SFK Trygg and was capped 25 times for Norway between 1923 and 1930, captaining the team on three occasions. He was also capped four times in bandy and became Norwegian champion in ice hockey in 1935. Berner died of a stroke aged 41.
