= 1930 Wyoming gubernatorial election =

- November 4, 1930
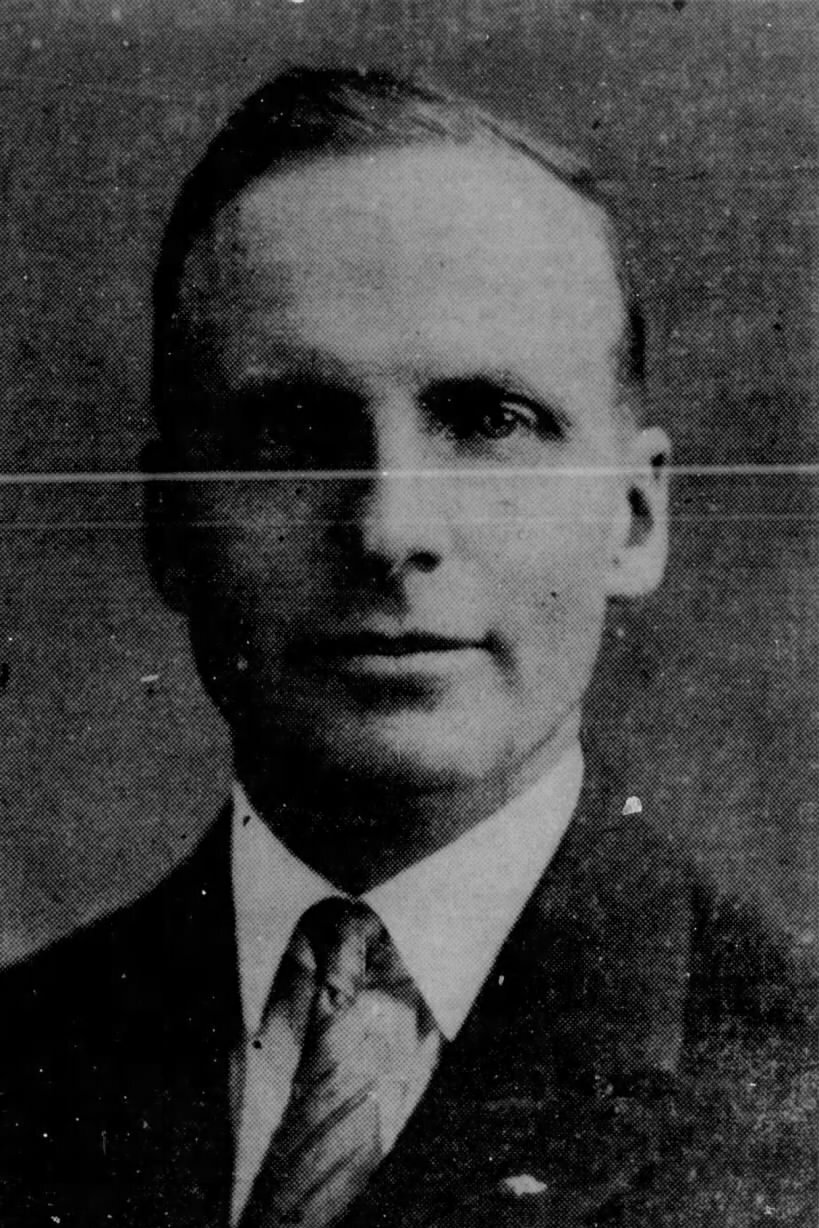

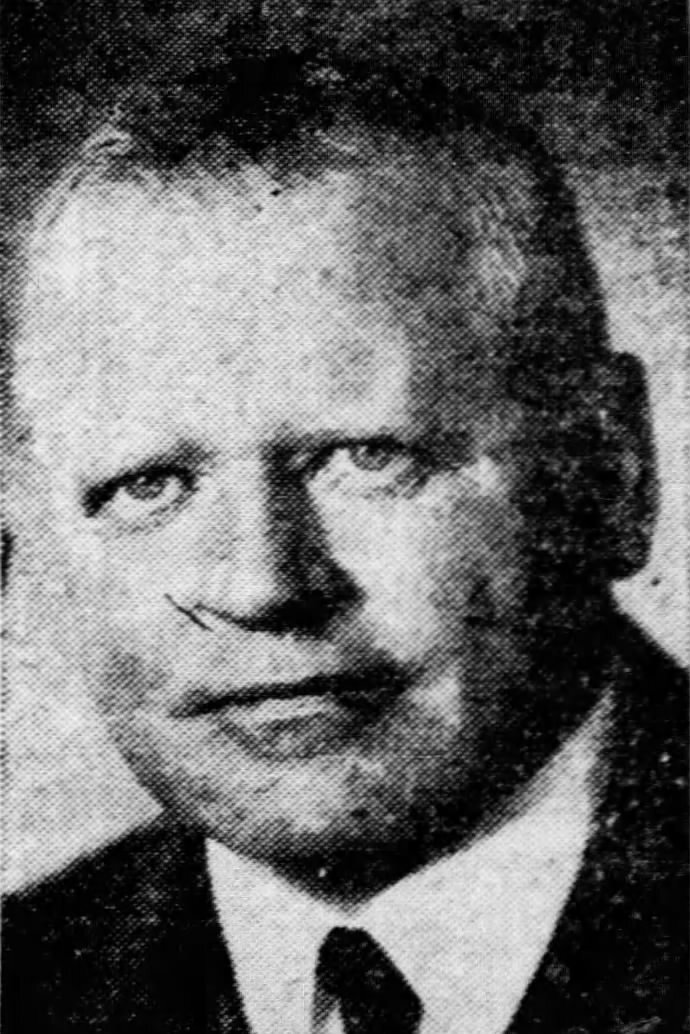
Nominee	Frank Emerson	Leslie A. Miller
Party	Republican	Democratic
Popular vote	38,058	37,188
Percentage	50.58%	49.42%
- County results Emerson: 50–60% 60–70% 70–80% Miller: 50–60% 60–70%
Governor before election
Frank Emerson
Republican
Elected Governor
Frank Emerson
Republican

The 1930 Wyoming gubernatorial election took place on November 4, 1930. Incumbent Republican Governor Frank Emerson ran for re-election. As was the case with Emerson's first election in 1926, he faced a tight race. He was opposed by State Senator Leslie A. Miller, the Democratic nominee. Ultimately, Emerson narrowly won re-election over Miller, winning 51-49%, and by a margin of just 870 votes. However, Emerson did not end up serving his full term; he died on February 18, 1931, just a few weeks into his second term, triggering a special election in 1932.

== Democratic primary ==
=== Candidates ===
- Leslie A. Miller, State Senator

=== Results ===
Democratic primary
Party	Candidate	Votes	%
Democratic	Leslie A. Miller	9,627	100.00%
Total votes		9,627	100.00%

== Republican primary ==
=== Candidates ===
- Frank Emerson, incumbent Governor
- William H. Edelman, Wyoming State Treasurer

=== Results ===
Republican primary
Party	Candidate	Votes	%
Republican	Frank C. Emerson (inc.)	30,009	71.71%
Republican	William H. Edelman	11,840	28.29%
Total votes		41,849	100.00%

== Results ==
1930 Wyoming gubernatorial election
Party	Candidate	Votes	%	±%
Republican	Frank C. Emerson (inc.)	38,058	50.58%	−0.32%
Democratic	Leslie A. Miller	37,188	49.42%	+0.47%
Majority		870	1.16%	−0.79%
Turnout		75,246		
Republican hold				
