= 1932 Wyoming gubernatorial special election =

- November 8, 1932
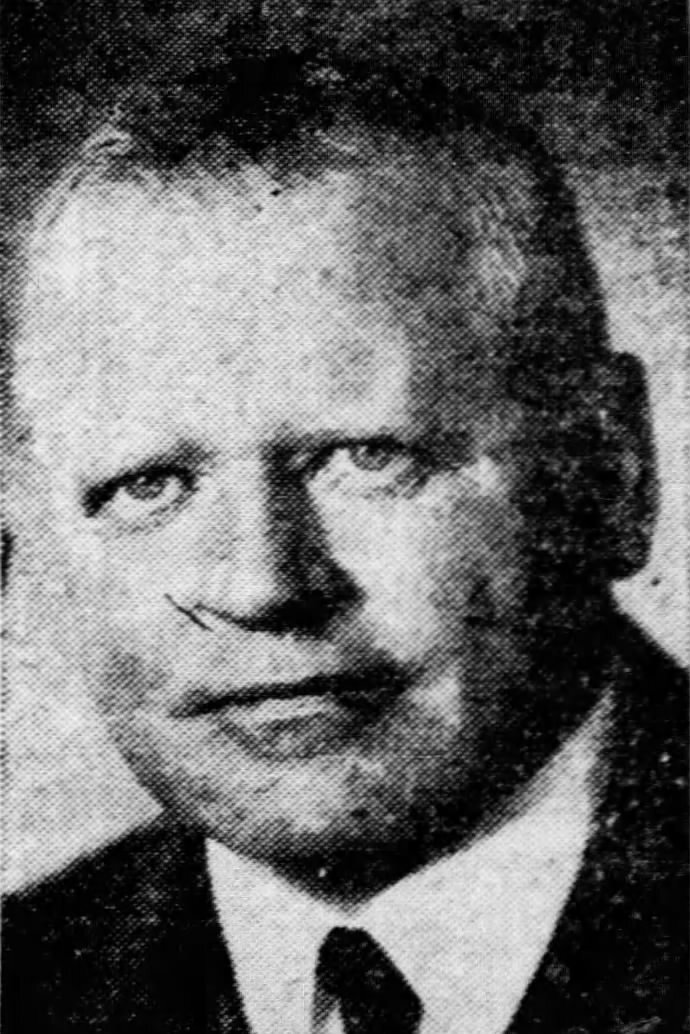

Nominee	Leslie A. Miller	Harry R. Weston
Party	Democratic	Republican
Popular vote	48,130	44,692
Percentage	50.85%	47.22%
- County results Miller: 40–50% 50–60% 60–70% Weston: 50–60% 60–70%
Governor before election
Alonzo M. Clark
Republican
Elected Governor
Leslie A. Miller
Democratic

The 1932 Wyoming gubernatorial special election took place on November 8, 1932. Just several weeks into his second term, Republican governor Frank Emerson died in office. Secretary of State Alonzo M. Clark ascended to the governorship, and a special election was called for 1932. Clark ran for re-election, but was defeated in the Republican primary by State Treasurer Harry R. Weston. Meanwhile, former state senator Leslie A. Miller, the unsuccessful Democratic nominee against Emerson in 1930, once again ran for the office and won the Democratic primary. In the general election, another close election ensued. But Miller, likely aided by Franklin D. Roosevelt's strong performance in Wyoming in that year's presidential election, narrowly defeated Weston to win his first term as governor.

== Democratic primary ==
=== Candidates ===
- Leslie A. Miller, former state senator, 1930 Democratic nominee for Governor
- T. D. O'Neil, former state highway commissioner

=== Results ===
Democratic primary
Party	Candidate	Votes	%
Democratic	Leslie A. Miller	13,997	55.77%
Democratic	T. D. O'Neil	11,100	44.23%
Total votes		25,097	100.00%

== Republican primary ==
=== Candidates ===
- Harry R. Weston, Wyoming State Treasurer
- Alonzo M. Clark, incumbent governor
- E. W. Rowell, Mayor of Casper

=== Results ===
Republican primary
Party	Candidate	Votes	%
Republican	Harry R. Weston	16,220	39.93%
Republican	Alonzo M. Clark (inc.)	15,948	39.26%
Republican	E. W. Rowell	8,449	20.80%
Total votes		40,617	100.00%

== Results ==
1932 Wyoming gubernatorial special election
Party	Candidate	Votes	%	±%
Democratic	Leslie A. Miller	48,130	50.85%	+0.27%
Republican	Harry R. Weston	44,692	47.22%	−2.20%
Socialist	A. O. Blow	1,647	1.74%	−
Communist	Merton Willer	180	0.19%	−
Majority		3,438	3.63%	+2.48%
Turnout		94,649		
Democratic gain from Republican				
