= State Bar of Montana =

Bar Association

- Type: Legal Society
- Headquarters: Helena, MT
- Location: United States
- Members: 4,100+ in 2012 (1,300 out of state)
- Website: http://www.montanabar.org/

The State Bar of Montana is the integrated (mandatory) bar association of the US state of Montana.

== Mission ==
The association helps to:

- maintain and improve the administration of justice
- encourage attorneys to maintain high standards of integrity, learning, competence, public service, and conduct
- safeguard a forum for the practice of law, the science of jurisprudence and law reform, and bar/public relations
- provide for continuing legal education of members of the bar,
- ensure that the legal profession's responsibilities to the public are more effectively discharged.

== History ==
In 1974, the State Bar of Montana was created by order of the Montana Supreme Court. Marshall H. Murray was the first president.

The predecessor to the State Bar of Montana was a voluntary organization, the Montana Bar Association, which was founded in 1885.

== Structure ==
SBM is governed by a Board of Trustees, consisting of 16 members plus four officers, as elected by the membership. The Board hires an Executive Director to supervise the staff.

The Bar enforces the rule that Montana lawyers complete 15 credits each year.

Major MSB activities include:

- Lawyers Fund for Client Protection, which makes restitution in cases where an attorney has improperly appropriated client funds.
- Lawyer Referral Service, which helps the public find a lawyer
- Fee Arbitration Program to settle fee disputes between an attorney and a client
- Financial support for legal services to the poor through the Montana Justice Foundation
- Practice-oriented sections addressing specialty interests
- Montana Lawyer, a monthly magazine.
