= Leslie A. Miller =

American politician (1886–1970)

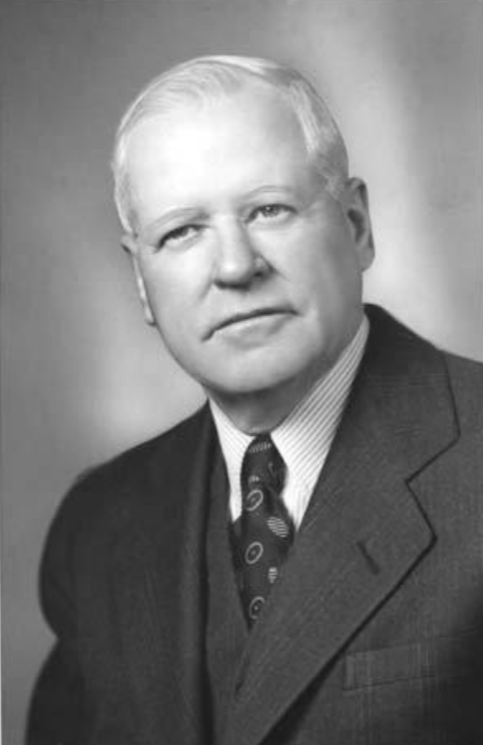
- Miller c. 1933

17th Governor of Wyoming
- In office January 2, 1933 – January 2, 1939
- Preceded by: Alonzo M. Clark
- Succeeded by: Nels H. Smith

Member of the Wyoming Senate from the Laramie County district
- In office January 9, 1945 – January 3, 1949 Serving with Pat Norris
- Preceded by: Reuben Anderson
- Succeeded by: Frank Thomas
- In office January 9, 1929 – July 1930 Serving with Edward T. Lazear
- Preceded by: Thomas Hunter
- Succeeded by: Roche S. Mentzer

Member of the Wyoming House of Representatives
- In office 1923–1925
- Constituency: Laramie County
- In office 1911–1913
- Constituency: Albany County

Personal details
- Born: Leslie Andrew Miller; January 29, 1886 Junction City, Kansas, U.S.
- Died: September 29, 1970 (aged 84) Cheyenne, Wyoming, U.S.
- Party: Democratic
- Spouse: Margaret Moran (m. 1909)
- Children: 2

Military service
- Branch/service: United States Marine Corps
- Years of service: 1918–1919
- Battles/wars: World War I

Leslie Andrew Miller (January 29, 1886 – September 29, 1970) was an American politician who served as the 17th governor of Wyoming from January 2, 1933, until January 2, 1939. He was a New Deal Democrat.

== Background ==
Miller was born in Junction City, Kansas on January 29, 1886. In 1892, his family moved to Wyoming. He served in the United States Marines from 1918 until 1919.

== Career ==
Miller entered politics following his service and was elected to the Wyoming House of Representatives. He was elected 17th Governor of Wyoming. He took his oath and was sworn in on December 27, 1932, 6-days early. He took office on January 2, 1933.

Governor Miller was re-elected in 1934 and he replaced hanging with the gas chamber for executions. In 1938, he was defeated by Nels H. Smith.

After his gubernatorial career, Miller served on the War Production Board as well as the Wyoming State Senate.

== Personal life and death ==
In 1909, Miller married Margaret Moran. The couple had two children.

Miller's health declined after he had a stroke in early 1969, and he died at a care home in Cheyenne, Wyoming, on September 29, 1970, at the age of 84.

== See also ==
- List of governors of Wyoming

Party political offices
Preceded by Nellie Tayloe Ross	Democratic nominee for Governor of Wyoming; 1930, 1932, 1934, 1938	Succeeded by Lester C. Hunt
Political offices
Preceded by Alonzo M. Clark	Governor of Wyoming; January 2, 1933 – January 2, 1939	Succeeded by Nels H. Smith
