= 1926 Wyoming gubernatorial election =

- November 2, 1926
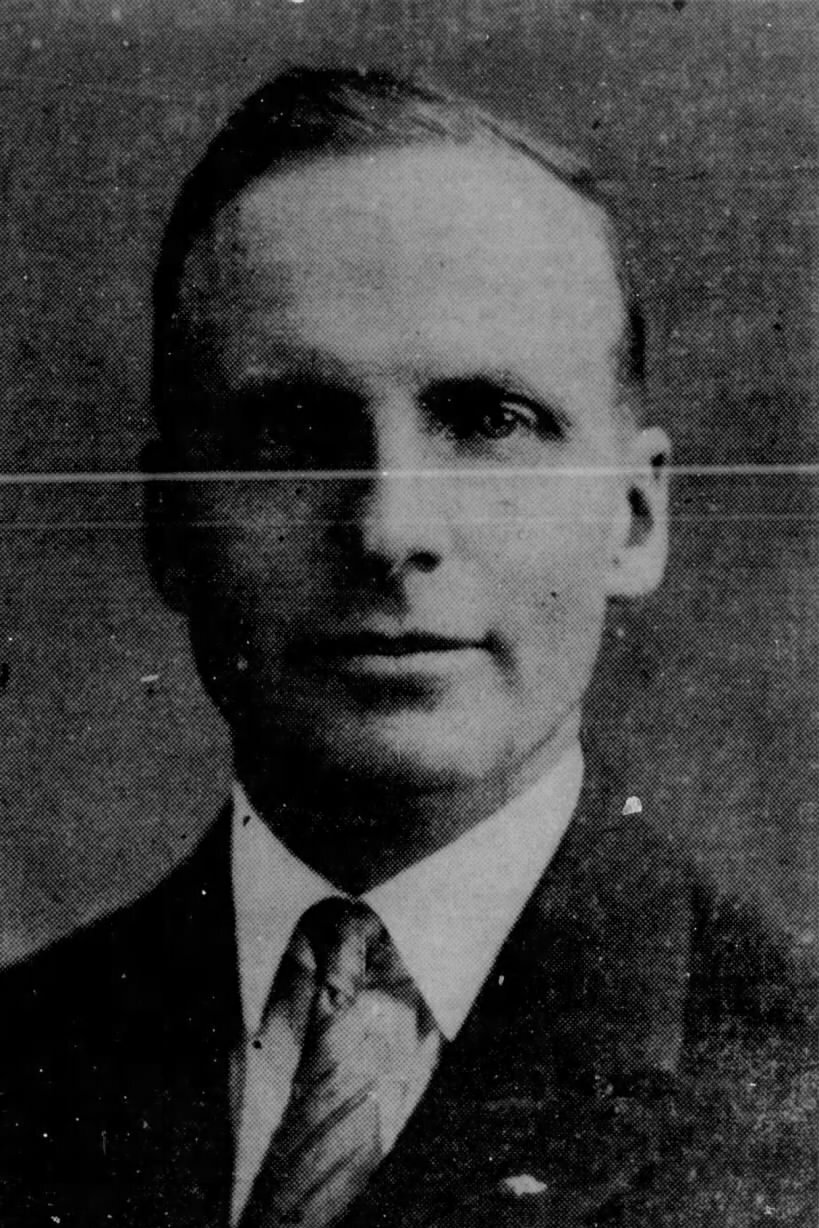

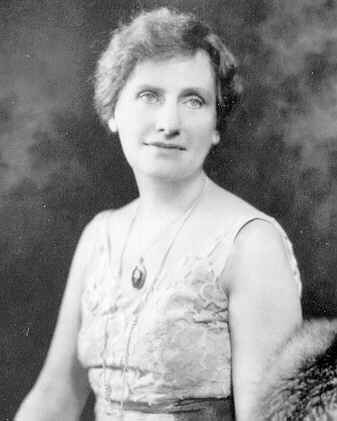
Nominee	Frank Emerson	Nellie Tayloe Ross
Party	Republican	Democratic
Popular vote	35,651	34,286
Percentage	50.90%	48.95%
- County results Emerson: 50–60% Ross: 40–50% 50–60%
Governor before election
Nellie Tayloe Ross
Democratic
Elected Governor
Frank Emerson
Republican

The 1926 Wyoming gubernatorial election took place on November 2, 1926. Incumbent Democratic Governor Nellie Tayloe Ross, first elected in the 1924 special election, ran for re-election to a second term. She was narrowly defeated by the Republican nominee, former State Engineer Frank Emerson.

== Democratic primary ==
=== Candidates ===
- Nellie Tayloe Ross, incumbent Governor

=== Results ===
Democratic primary
Party	Candidate	Votes	%
Democratic	Nellie Tayloe Ross (inc.)	13,175	100.00%
Total votes		13,175	100.00%

== Republican primary ==
=== Candidates ===
- Frank Emerson, State Engineer
- Frank Lucas, Secretary of State, former Governor
- H. A. Lathrop, physician (dropped out)

Republican primary
Party	Candidate	Votes	%
Republican	Frank C. Emerson	17,630	58.00%
Republican	Frank E. Lucas	11,362	37.38%
Republican	H. A. Lathrop	1,404	4.62%
Total votes		30,396	100.00%

== General election ==
=== Results ===
1926 Wyoming gubernatorial election
Party	Candidate	Votes	%	±%
Republican	Frank C. Emerson	35,651	50.90%	+6.02%
Democratic	Nellie Tayloe Ross (inc.)	34,286	48.95%	−6.17%
Radical Party	William B. Guthrie	104	0.15%	+0.15%
Majority		1,365	1.95%	−8.29%
Turnout		70,041		
Republican gain from Democratic				
