= 1924 Wyoming gubernatorial special election =

- November 4, 1924
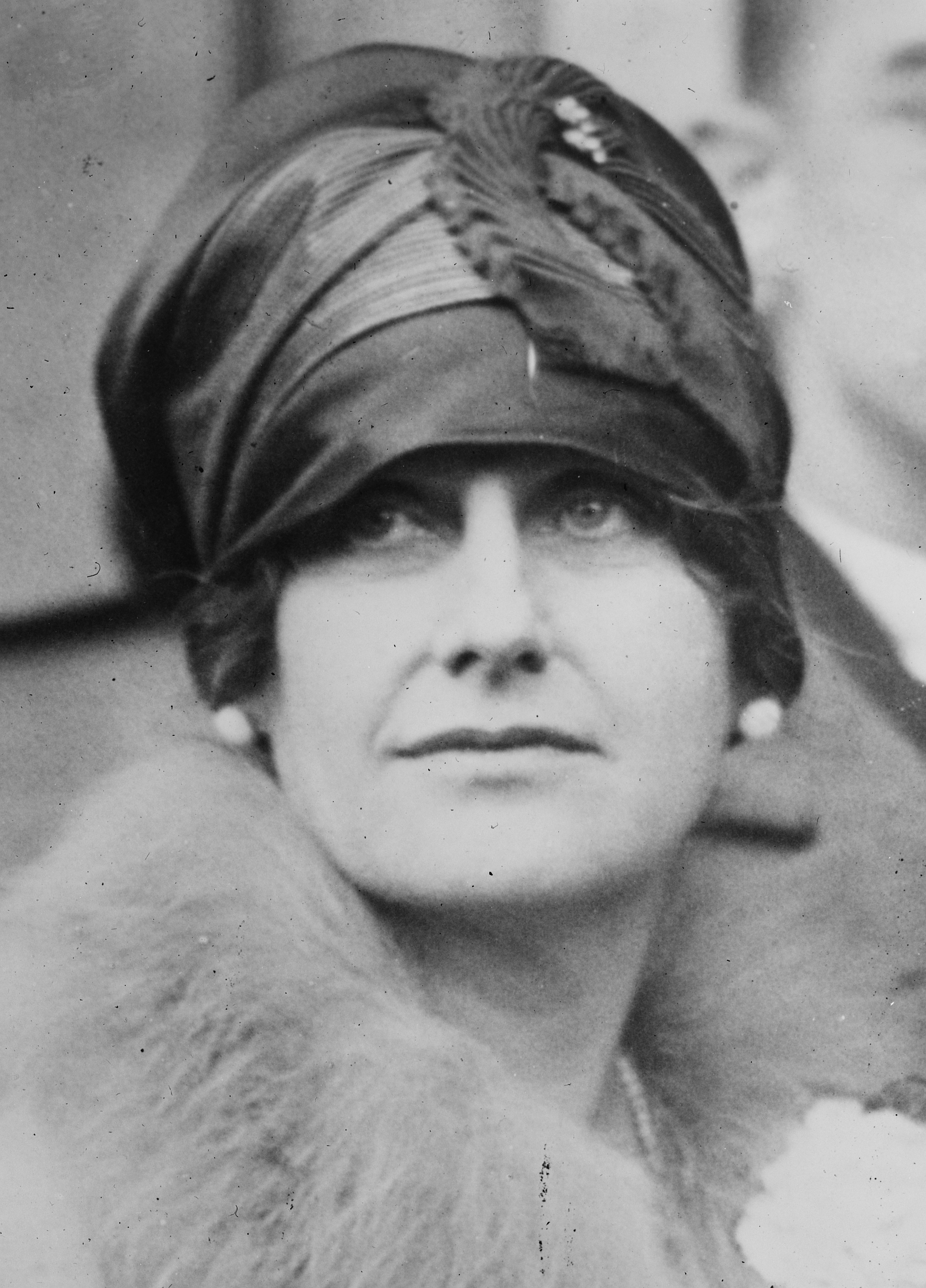

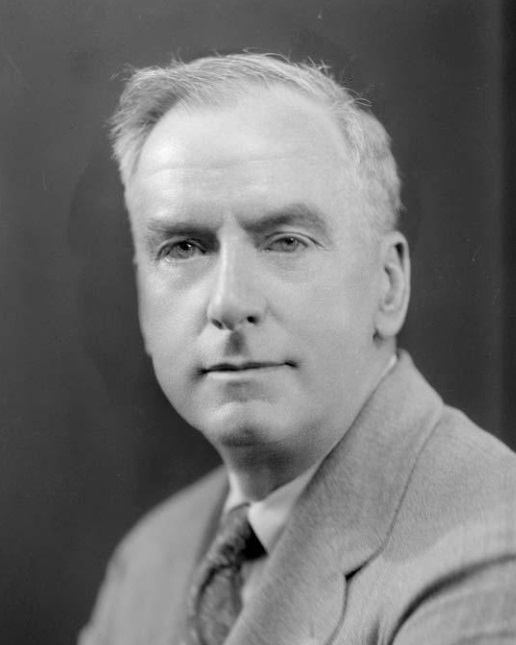
| Nominee | Nellie Tayloe Ross | E. J. Sullivan |
| Party | Democratic | Republican |
| Popular vote | 43,323 | 35,275 |
| Percentage | 55.12% | 44.88% |
- County results Ross: 50–60% 60–70% Sullivan: 50–60% 60–70%
Governor before election
Frank Lucas
Republican
Elected Governor
Nellie Tayloe Ross
Democratic

The 1924 Wyoming gubernatorial special election took place on November 4, 1924. William B. Ross, the Democratic Governor of Wyoming, died in office on October 2, 1924, temporarily elevating Republican Secretary of State Frank Lucas to the governorship. A special election was held to fill the remainder of Ross's term and his widow, Nellie Tayloe Ross, defeated Republican nominee E. J. Sullivan, becoming the first ever female governor of any U.S. state.

== Campaign ==
Following Governor Ross's death on October 2, 1924, Secretary of State Frank Lucas ascended to the governorship. On October 6, Lucas issued a proclamation for a special election, but ambiguities in the law prompted him to seek a formal opinion from the state attorney general as to how candidates would be selected and how the election would be conducted. On October 9, the attorney general issued an opinion clarifying that candidates could be nominated by petition (in which case they would be listed as "independent" on the ballot) or by political party conventions. Accordingly, the Democratic and Republican parties scheduled conventions for October 14.

=== Democratic convention ===
As the Democratic convention convened in Cheyenne on October 14, speculation swirled around four potential candidates: Nellie Tayloe Ross, the widow of Governor Ross; Attorney General David J. Howell; former Assistant Secretary of the Interior Samuel G. Hopkins; and Charles D. Carey, the son of former Governor Joseph M. Carey. Ross was reported to be the favorite of the convention's delegates and it was considered a "not entirely remote" possibility that if the Democratic Party nominated her, the Republican Party would, too.

As the convention started, however, it was unclear if Ross would be a candidate. By her own account, she was uncertain whether she would accept the nomination:

When the day arrived on which the nominees were to be chosen by emergency conventions, a committee from the Democratic convention came to ask me if I would accept the nomination if it were proffered.

I told them I should not.

"Don't make it an absolute refusal," one of the members urged with fervor that almost disarmed me, and I think I made no reply.

— Nellie Tayloe Ross, "The Governor Lady", Good Housekeeping (1927)

The state party chairman relayed this uncertainty, saying that Ross had informed him that she might not accept a nomination. At the beginning of the convention, Hopkins withdrew from consideration and the race apparently narrowed to Carey and Howell. However, Carey's reluctance to accept the nomination pushed the convention to adjourn for several hours.

When the convention returned, delegates put Ross's name, and that of former State Senator Patrick J. O'Connor, into consideration. O'Connor withdrew and the convention unanimously nominated Ross. Ross was informed that she had been nominated and had just 45 minutes to accept or decline it prior to the filing deadline. She reported that she was "overwhelmed" by the "warm protestations of loyalty and confident predictions of victory of those faithful friends," and "the first thing I knew, I was committed."

=== Republican convention ===
On the Republican side, speculation about potential candidates circled around three men: former State Representative E. J. Sullivan; acting Governor Lucas; and C. Watt Brandon, an official with the Coolidge presidential campaign. Though former Governor Robert D. Carey was favored by many of the convention delegates, he ultimately declined to run. During the course of the convention, Brandon, Lucas, and Sullivan were all nominated, as were attorney George Brimmer; former State Senator H.J. Chassell, and banker S. A. Nelson. After several rounds of balloting, Sullivan emerged as the presumptive nominee, winning the support of 17 out of 22 committee members, who then moved to nominate him unanimously.

== General election ==
=== Results ===
1924 Wyoming gubernatorial election
| Party | Candidate | Votes | % | ±% |
|---|---|---|---|---|
| Democratic | Nellie Tayloe Ross | 43,323 | 55.12 | +5.71% |
| Republican | E. J. Sullivan | 35,275 | 44.88 | −5.71% |
| Majority | | 8,048 | 10.24% | +9.06% |
| Total votes | | 78,598 | 100.00% | |
| Democratic gain from Republican | | | | |

=== By county ===
| County | Nellie Tayloe Ross Democratic | | E. J. Sullivan Republican | | Margin | | Total |
| County | Votes | % | Votes | % | Votes | % | Total |
|---|---|---|---|---|---|---|---|
| Albany | 2,750 | 60.18% | 1,820 | 39.82% | 930 | 20.35% | 4,570 |
| Big Horn | 1,964 | 53.36% | 1,717 | 46.64% | 247 | 6.71% | 3,681 |
| Campbell | 1,258 | 61.22% | 797 | 38.78% | 461 | 22.43% | 2,055 |
| Carbon | 2,228 | 51.15% | 2,128 | 48.85% | 100 | 2.30% | 4,356 |
| Converse | 1,616 | 53.40% | 1,410 | 46.60% | 206 | 6.81% | 3,026 |
| Crook | 1,022 | 58.30% | 731 | 41.70% | 291 | 16.60% | 1,753 |
| Fremont | 2,204 | 58.85% | 1,541 | 41.15% | 663 | 17.70% | 3,745 |
| Goshen | 1,652 | 58.42% | 1,176 | 41.58% | 476 | 16.83% | 2,828 |
| Hot Springs | 1,233 | 55.97% | 970 | 44.03% | 263 | 11.94% | 2,203 |
| Johnson | 1,065 | 56.02% | 836 | 43.98% | 229 | 12.05% | 1,901 |
| Laramie | 4,102 | 54.12% | 3,477 | 45.88% | 625 | 8.25% | 7,579 |
| Lincoln | 1,357 | 46.00% | 1,593 | 54.00% | -236 | -8.00% | 2,950 |
| Natrona | 6,312 | 46.68% | 7,209 | 53.32% | -897 | -6.63% | 13,521 |
| Niobrara | 1,023 | 62.42% | 616 | 37.58% | 407 | 24.83% | 1,639 |
| Park | 1,846 | 64.01% | 1,038 | 35.99% | 808 | 28.02% | 2,884 |
| Platte | 1,827 | 67.62% | 875 | 32.38% | 952 | 35.23% | 2,702 |
| Sheridan | 3,450 | 60.79% | 2,225 | 39.21% | 1,225 | 21.59% | 5,675 |
| Sublette | 287 | 35.26% | 527 | 64.74% | -240 | -29.48% | 814 |
| Sweetwater | 2,631 | 56.89% | 1,994 | 43.11% | 637 | 13.77% | 4,625 |
| Teton | 315 | 50.08% | 314 | 49.92% | 1 | 0.16% | 629 |
| Uinta | 1,416 | 58.01% | 1,025 | 41.99% | 391 | 16.02% | 2,441 |
| Washakie | 634 | 52.70% | 569 | 47.30% | 65 | 5.40% | 1,203 |
| Weston | 1,131 | 62.21% | 687 | 37.79% | 444 | 24.42% | 1,818 |
