= Frank Lucas (Wyoming politician) =

American politician (1876–1948)

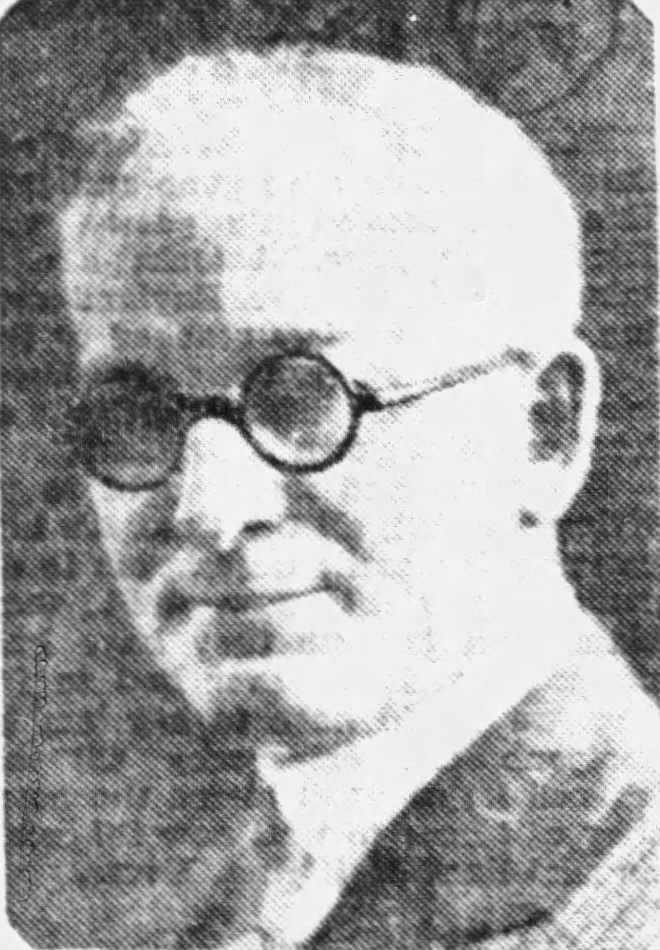

13th Governor of Wyoming
- In office October 2, 1924 – January 5, 1925
- Preceded by: William B. Ross
- Succeeded by: Nellie Tayloe Ross

7th Secretary of State of Wyoming
- In office January 1, 1923 – January 3, 1927
- Governor: William B. Ross; Himself; Nellie Tayloe Ross
- Preceded by: William E. Chaplin
- Succeeded by: Alonzo M. Clark

Member of the Wyoming Senate from Johnson County
- In office 1919–1923
- Preceded by: J. W. Todd
- Succeeded by: Frank O. Horton

Member of the Wyoming House of Representatives from Johnson County
- In office 1915–1919 Serving with Herman A. C. Luddecke (1915), W. P. Adams (1917)
- Preceded by: Albert L. Brock, Robert L. Van Winkle
- Succeeded by: Mart. O. Hibbard

Personal details
- Born: Franklin Earl Lucas; August 4, 1876 Grant City, Missouri, U.S.
- Died: November 26, 1948 (aged 72) Buffalo, Wyoming, U.S.
- Resting place: Willow Grove Cemetery, Buffalo, Wyoming
- Party: Republican
- Spouse: Ina Belle Craven
- Children: 3
- Occupation: Newspaper publisher

Franklin Earl Lucas (August 4, 1876 – November 26, 1948) was an American businessman and politician from Wyoming. A Republican, he is most notable for his service as the 13th governor of Wyoming from 1924 until 1925. Lucas served as the secretary of state of Wyoming from 1923 to 1927, an office to which he was elected after previously serving in the Wyoming House of Representatives and Wyoming Senate.

== Biography ==
Lucas was born in Grant City, Missouri on August 4, 1876. He was raised and educated in Bedford, Iowa, and left school after the eighth grade to begin training for a career in journalism as a printer's apprentice. After completing his apprentice ship and working for two Iowa newspapers, in 1899 he moved to Buffalo, Wyoming, where he became owner and publisher of the Buffalo Bulletin.

As publisher, Lucas used the Bulletin to advocate for Republican policies and candidates, and was eventually encouraged to run for office himself. Lucas served in the Wyoming House of Representatives for two terms (1915 to 1919) and Wyoming Senate for two (1919 to 1923). In 1922, Lucas was the successful Republican nominee for Secretary of State of Wyoming.

Lucas was serving as secretary of state in October 1924 when Governor William B. Ross died. As next in line, Lucas succeeded to the governorship, and he carried out the responsibilities of that office while continuing to serve as secretary of state. In November, Ross's widow, Democrat Nellie Tayloe Ross won election to the special election to complete her husband's term, becoming the first woman governor in the history of the United States. Lucas continued to serve as governor until the start of Mrs. Ross's term in January 1925, then resumed his secretary of state duties.

Lucas ran for Governor in 1926 but was defeated in the Republican primary by Frank Emerson. He ran again in 1934, and was defeated in the Republican primary by Alonzo M. Clark. After leaving office, Lucas returned to management of the Buffalo Bulletin. He died in Buffalo on November 26, 1948. He was buried at Willow Grove Cemetery in Buffalo.

Lucas was the husband of Ina Belle Craven. They were the parents of three children, one of whom died in infancy.

== See also ==
- List of governors of Wyoming

Political offices
Preceded by William E. Chaplin	Secretary of State of Wyoming; 1923–1927	Succeeded by Alonzo M. Clark
Preceded by William B. Ross	Governor of Wyoming; October 2, 1924 – January 5, 1925	Succeeded by Nellie Tayloe Ross
