= Jacob Berner (politician) =

American politician (1865–1931)

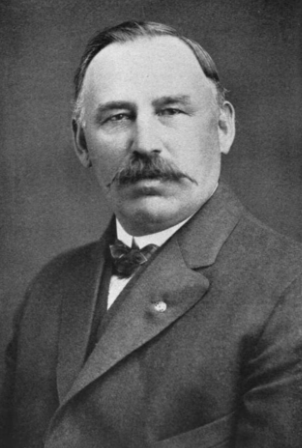

Member of the Wyoming Senate
- In office 1911–1919

Personal details
- Born: Jacob J. Berner; October 23, 1865 Altdorf/Altdorf, Kingdom of Württemberg
- Died: May 18, 1931 (aged 65) Torrance, California, U.S.
- Resting place: Greenhill Cemetery, Laramie, Wyoming, U.S.
- Party: Democratic
- Spouse: Martha Jane Nagel
- Children: 8
- Parents: Conrad Berner (father); Mary Hahn (mother)

Jacob J. Berner (October 23, 1865 – May 18, 1931) was an American politician who served in the Wyoming Senate as a Democrat.

== Life ==
Jacob J. Berner was born in Altdorf, Kingdom of Württemberg to Conrad Berner and Mary Hahn on October 23, 1865. On August 31, 1880, his family moved to the Wyoming Territory and became ranchers until 1885 and then carpenters until 1900. On March 28, 1893, he married Martha Jane Nagel and later had eight children with her.

Berner was elected as deputy sheriff of Albany county and served from 1897 to 1898. From 1909 to 1911 he served on the board of Albany county commissioners. In 1910 he was elected to the Wyoming Senate and served until 1919 where he served on the judiciary, public buildings and institutions, elections, and immigration committees.

In 1920 he left Laramie, Wyoming and moved to Torrance, California where he died on May 18, 1931, after suffering from an illness for months.
