= Alonzo M. Clark =

American politician (1868–1952)

Alonzo Monroe Clark
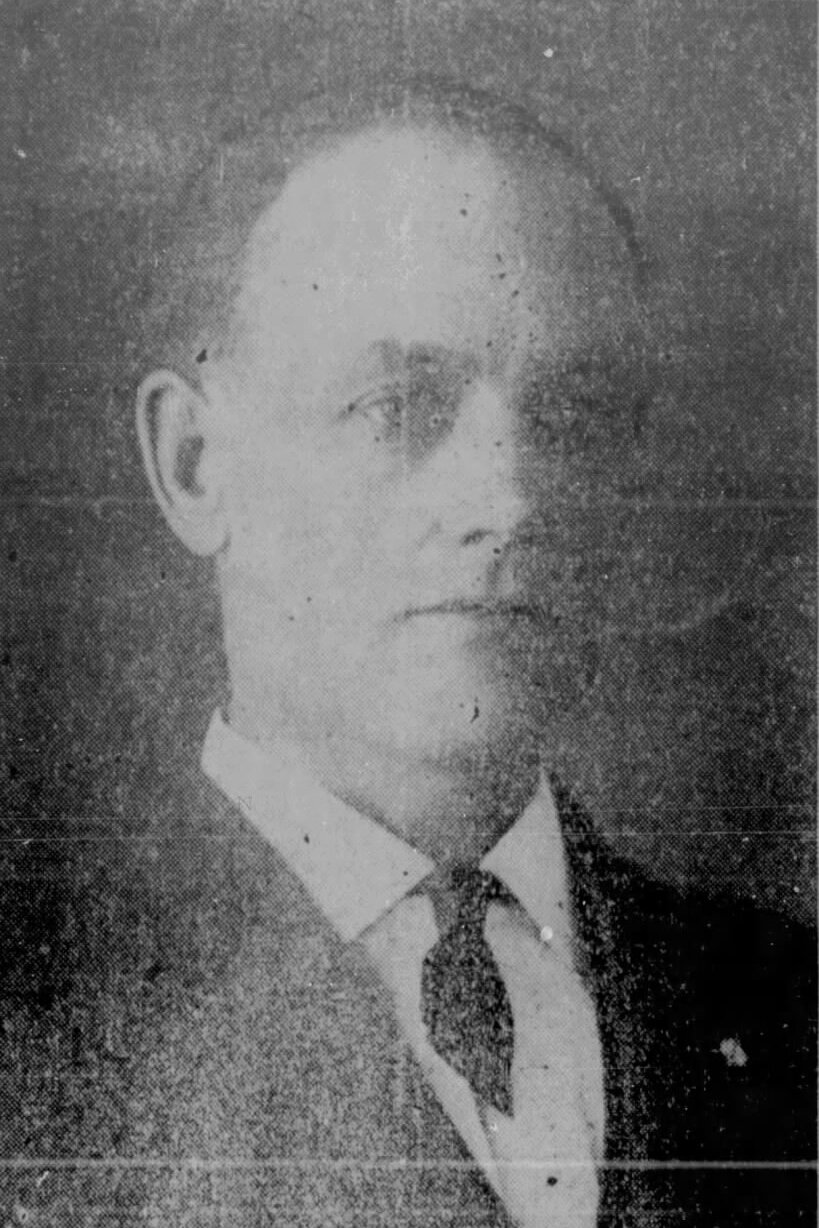
- Clark c. 1932

16th Governor of Wyoming
- In office February 18, 1931 – January 2, 1933
- Preceded by: Frank Emerson
- Succeeded by: Leslie A. Miller

8th Secretary of State of Wyoming
- In office January 3, 1927 – January 7, 1935
- Governor: Frank C. Emerson; Himself; Leslie A. Miller
- Preceded by: Frank Lucas
- Succeeded by: Lester C. Hunt

Personal details
- Born: August 13, 1868 Flint, Indiana, U.S.
- Died: October 12, 1952 (aged 84) Thermopolis, Wyoming, U.S.
- Resting place: Carleton, Nebraska, U.S.
- Party: Republican

Alonzo Monroe Clark (August 13, 1868 – October 12, 1952) was an American politician who was the 16th governor of Wyoming from 1931 to 1933. A Republican, he took office after sitting governor Frank Emerson's death. He lost his re-election campaign.

== Biography ==
Clark was born in Flint, Indiana. He was raised and educated in Nebraska after his family moved there from Indiana. After graduating from Nebraska State Teachers College in 1898, he served as Superintendent of Schools for Dawes County, Nebraska, before moving to Wyoming in 1901. He homesteaded more than 300 acres (1.2 km^{2}) in Campbell County, Wyoming, and was a teacher.

In 1926, he was elected Secretary of State, and he was re-elected in 1930. When the then-current governor, Frank Emerson died, on February 18, 1931, just six weeks into his second term, Clark succeeded to the governorship. He took the oath of office after Emerson's Sunday funeral, which was three days later. That November, he was defeated in the Republican primary, and resumed his term as Secretary of State. His loss in the primary remains the closest primary defeat for an incumbent Republican governor in United States history.

In 1934 he successfully secured the Republican nomination, but lost in the general election to the then-incumbent, Democrat Leslie A. Miller. He also campaigned unsuccessfully for seats in the U.S. House of Representatives and U.S. Senate.

The National Governors Association noted:

Serving during the Great Depression, Clark supported President Hoover’s position of state self-reliance. He also pressed for cooperative marketing of agricultural products and the repeal of prohibition, and fought unsuccessfully for termination of the sale of crude oil from federal lands in Wyoming.

He was married twice, first to Lucy M. Smith (who died in 1944) with whom he had one child, and then to Florence Russell.

He died on October 12, 1952, in Thermopolis, Wyoming, aged 84, and is buried in Carleton, Nebraska.

Party political offices
Preceded by Harry R. Weston	Republican nominee for Governor of Wyoming; 1934	Succeeded by Nels H. Smith
Political offices
Preceded by Frank Lucas	Secretary of State of Wyoming; 1927–1935	Succeeded by Lester C. Hunt
Preceded by Frank Emerson	Governor of Wyoming; February 18, 1931 – January 2, 1933	Succeeded by Leslie A. Miller
