= Frank Emerson =

American politician (1882–1931)

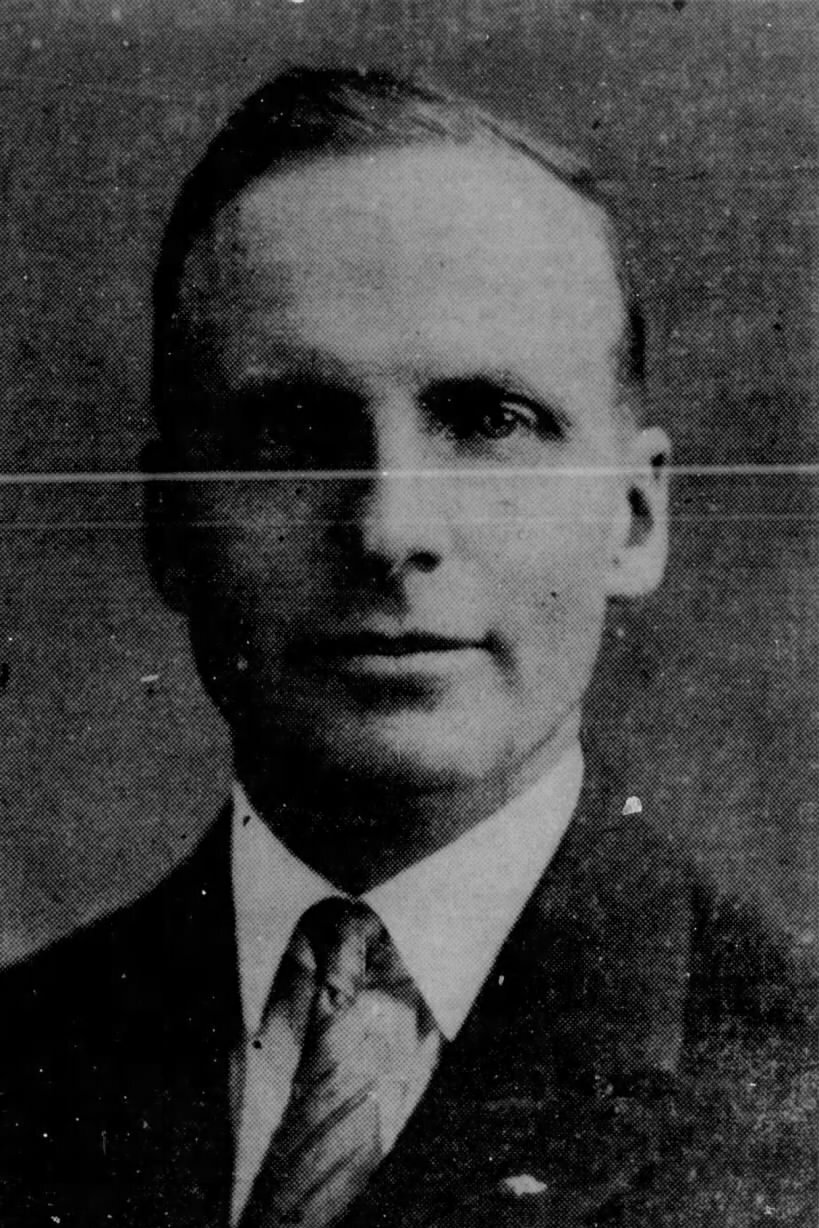
- Emerson c. 1926

15th Governor of Wyoming
- In office January 3, 1927 – February 18, 1931
- Preceded by: Nellie Tayloe Ross
- Succeeded by: Alonzo M. Clark

Personal details
- Born: Frank Collins Emerson; May 26, 1882 Saginaw, Michigan, U.S.
- Died: February 18, 1931 (aged 48) Cheyenne, Wyoming, U.S.
- Resting place: Lakeview Cemetery, Cheyenne, Wyoming
- Party: Republican
- Spouse: Zennia Jean Reynders
- Children: 3
- Education: University of Michigan
- Profession: Engineer

Frank Collins Emerson (May 26, 1882 – February 18, 1931) was an American engineer and politician who served as the 15th governor of Wyoming from 1927 until his death in 1931.

== Biography ==
Frank C. Emerson was born in Saginaw, Michigan on May 26, 1882. He graduated from the University of Michigan in 1904 with a Bachelor of Science degree in Civil Engineering.

After graduating from college, Emerson relocated to Cora, Wyoming, where he became chief engineer of the Wyoming Land and Irrigation Company. He later worked for other corporations, including the Big Horn Canal Association, Lower Hanover Canal Association, Wyoming Sugar Company, and Worland Drainage District.

From 1919 to 1926, Emerson served as Wyoming State Engineer. In this post, Emerson was one of the main proponents of the Colorado River Compact.

In 1923, Governor William B. Ross removed Emerson from the state engineer's post. Emerson sued, and after a 10-month court fight he was reinstated.

Ross died in late 1924 and was succeeded first by Frank Lucas, then by Ross's widow Nellie Tayloe Ross, who won the 1924 special election to complete her husband's term and became the first woman governor in the United States.

In 1926, Emerson won the Republican nomination for governor and he defeated Nellie Ross in the general election. He was reelected in 1930, and served from January 1927 until his death from pneumonia in Cheyenne, Wyoming on February 18, 1931. He was buried at Lakeview Cemetery in Cheyenne.

Emerson was married to Zennia Jean Reynders. They were the parents of three children.

Party political offices
Preceded by E. J. Sullivan	Republican nominee for Governor of Wyoming; 1926, 1930	Succeeded by Harry R. Weston
Political offices
Preceded by Nellie Tayloe Ross	Governor of Wyoming; January 3, 1927 – February 18, 1931	Succeeded by Alonzo M. Clark
