= Nellie Tayloe Ross =

American politician (1876–1977)

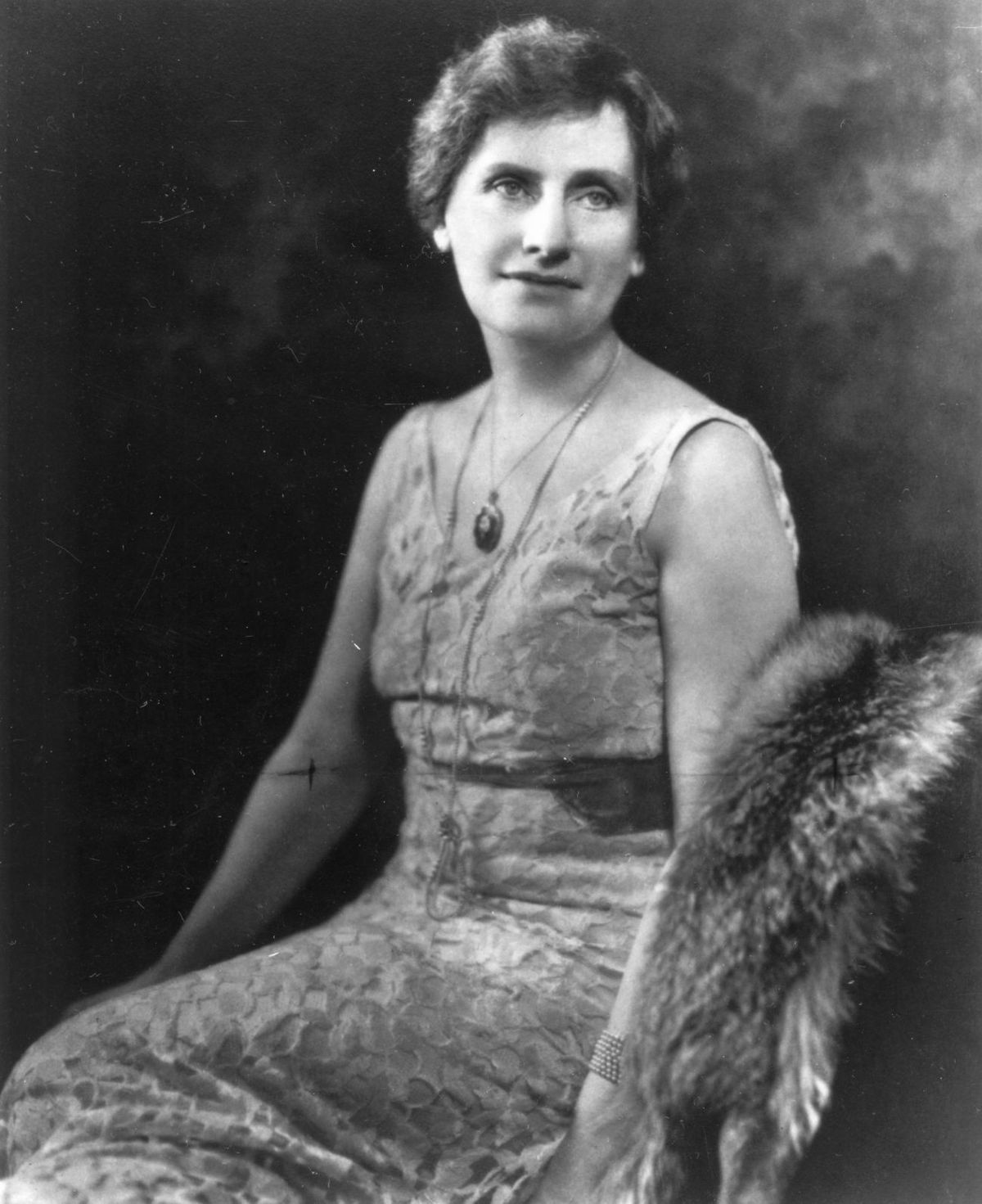
- Ross, c. 1922

28th Director of the United States Mint
- In office May 3, 1933 – April 1953
- President: Franklin D. Roosevelt; Harry S. Truman; Dwight D. Eisenhower
- Preceded by: Robert J. Grant
- Succeeded by: William H. Brett

14th Governor of Wyoming
- In office January 5, 1925 – January 3, 1927
- Preceded by: Frank Lucas
- Succeeded by: Frank Emerson

First Lady of Wyoming
- In office January 1, 1923 – October 2, 1924
- Governor: William B. Ross
- Preceded by: Ida Mason Christy (1919)
- Succeeded by: Ina Belle Craven

Personal details
- Born: Nellie Davis Tayloe; November 29, 1876 St. Joseph, Missouri, U.S.
- Died: December 19, 1977 (aged 101) Washington, D.C., U.S.
- Party: Democratic
- Spouse: William B. Ross (m. 1902; died 1924)
- Children: 3
- Relatives: Nellie Tayloe Sanders (great-granddaughter)

Nellie Davis Tayloe Ross (née Tayloe; November 29, 1876 – December 19, 1977) was an American educator and politician who served as the 14th governor of Wyoming from 1925 to 1927, and as the 28th and first female director of the United States Mint from 1933 to 1953. She was the first woman to serve as governor of a U.S. state, and remains the only woman to have served as governor of Wyoming. She was a Democrat and supported Prohibition.

Ross was born in St. Joseph, Missouri, to James Wynns Tayloe, a native of Tennessee, and Elizabeth Blair Green, who owned a plantation on the Missouri River. Her family moved to Miltonvale, Kansas, in 1884, and she graduated from Miltonvale High School in 1892. She attended a teacher-training college for two years and taught kindergarten for four years.

On September 11, 1902, Ross married William B. Ross, whom she had met when visiting relatives in Tennessee in 1900. William B. Ross was governor of Wyoming from 1923 to his death on October 2, 1924. Ross succeeded her husband's successor Frank Lucas as governor when she won the special election, becoming the first female American governor on January 5, 1925. She was a staunch supporter of Prohibition during the 1920s. She lost re-election in 1926, but remained an active member of the Democratic Party.

In 1933, Ross became the first female Director of the United States Mint. Despite initial mistrust, she forged a strong bond with Mary Margaret O'Reilly, the assistant director of the Mint and one of the United States' highest-ranking female civil servants of her time. Ross served five terms as Director, retiring in 1953. During her later years, she wrote for various women's magazines and traveled. Ross died in Washington, D.C., at the age of 101.

== Early life and education ==
Born Nellie Davis Tayloe in St. Joseph, Missouri, Ross was the sixth child, and first daughter, of James Wynns Tayloe, a native of Stewart County, Tennessee, and his wife, Elizabeth Blair Green, who owned a plantation on the Missouri River. She spent much of her childhood in Florence, Alabama, and Decatur, Alabama, in the Tennessee Valley. In 1884, when Ross was seven years of age, her family moved to Miltonvale, Kansas. This relocation happened after her father's old family home back in St. Joseph burned, and the sheriff was about to foreclose on the property.

After Ross graduated from Miltonville High School in 1892, her family moved to Omaha, Nebraska. During this time, she taught private piano lessons and attended a two-year training program for kindergarten teachers that was sponsored by the Omaha city school system. She then taught kindergarten for four years. Two of her brothers sent her on a trip to Europe in 1896.

While on a visit to her relatives in Dover, Tennessee, in 1900, Ross met William Bradford Ross, whom she married on September 11, 1902. They had three children, twins James Ambrose and George Taylor, and Alfred Duff. William Ross practiced law and planned to live in the American West. He moved to Cheyenne and established a law practice, bringing his wife to join him.

Ross became a leader in Wyoming's Democratic Party, and served as Laramie County's prosecuting attorney from 1906 to 1907. In 1910 he was an unsuccessful candidate for Wyoming's at-large congressional seat. In 1918, he was an unsuccessful candidate for the Democratic nomination for governor.

== Governorship of Wyoming ==
In 1922, William Ross was elected governor of Wyoming by appealing to progressive voters in both parties. However, after little more than a year and a half in office, he died on October 2, 1924, from surgical complications following an appendectomy. The Democratic Party then nominated his widow, Nellie, to run for governor in a special election the following month.

Nellie Ross refused to campaign. She won the November 4, 1924, election with 43,323 votes (55.12%) against her opponent's 35,275 votes (44.88%). On January 5, 1925, she became the first female governor in the history of the United States. As governor she continued her husband's policies, which called for tax cuts, government assistance for poor farmers, banking reform, and laws protecting children, women workers, and miners. She urged Wyoming to ratify a pending federal amendment prohibiting child labor. Like her husband, she advocated the strengthening of prohibition laws.

Ross ran for re-election in 1926, and relied on campaign surrogates including Cecilia Hennel Hendricks, the Democratic nominee for State Superintendent of Public Instruction, but was narrowly defeated by Frank Emerson. She attributed her loss in part to her refusal to campaign for herself and support for prohibition. She remained active in the Democratic Party and campaigned for Al Smith in the 1928 presidential election, even though the two disagreed on prohibition. At the 1928 Democratic National Convention, she received 33 votes from eleven states for vice president on the first ballot. She also gave a speech seconding Smith's nomination. After the convention, she served as vice chairman of the Democratic National Committee and as director of the DNC Women's Division.

== Director of U.S. Mint ==
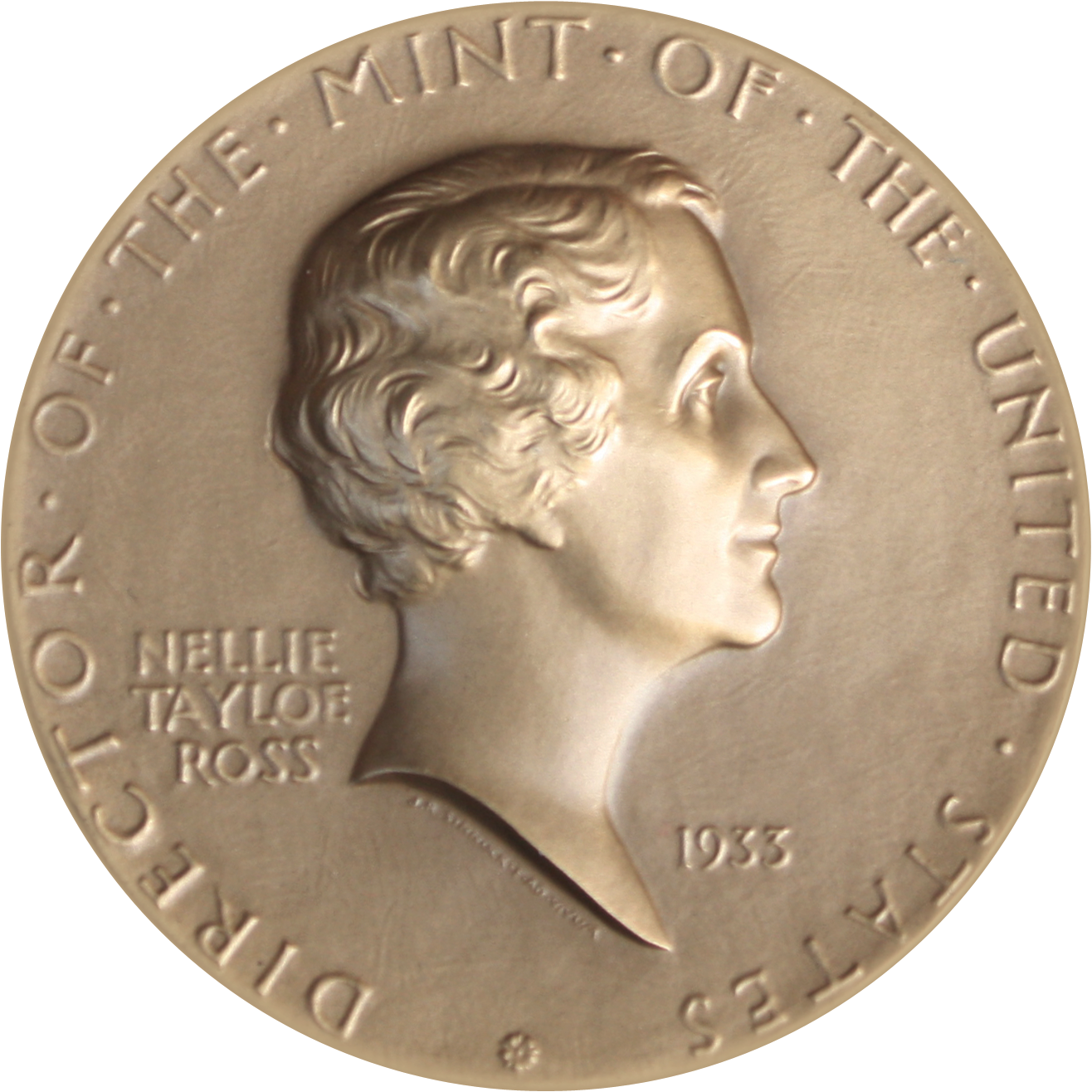
Ross, as seen on her Mint medal designed by Chief Engraver John R. Sinnock

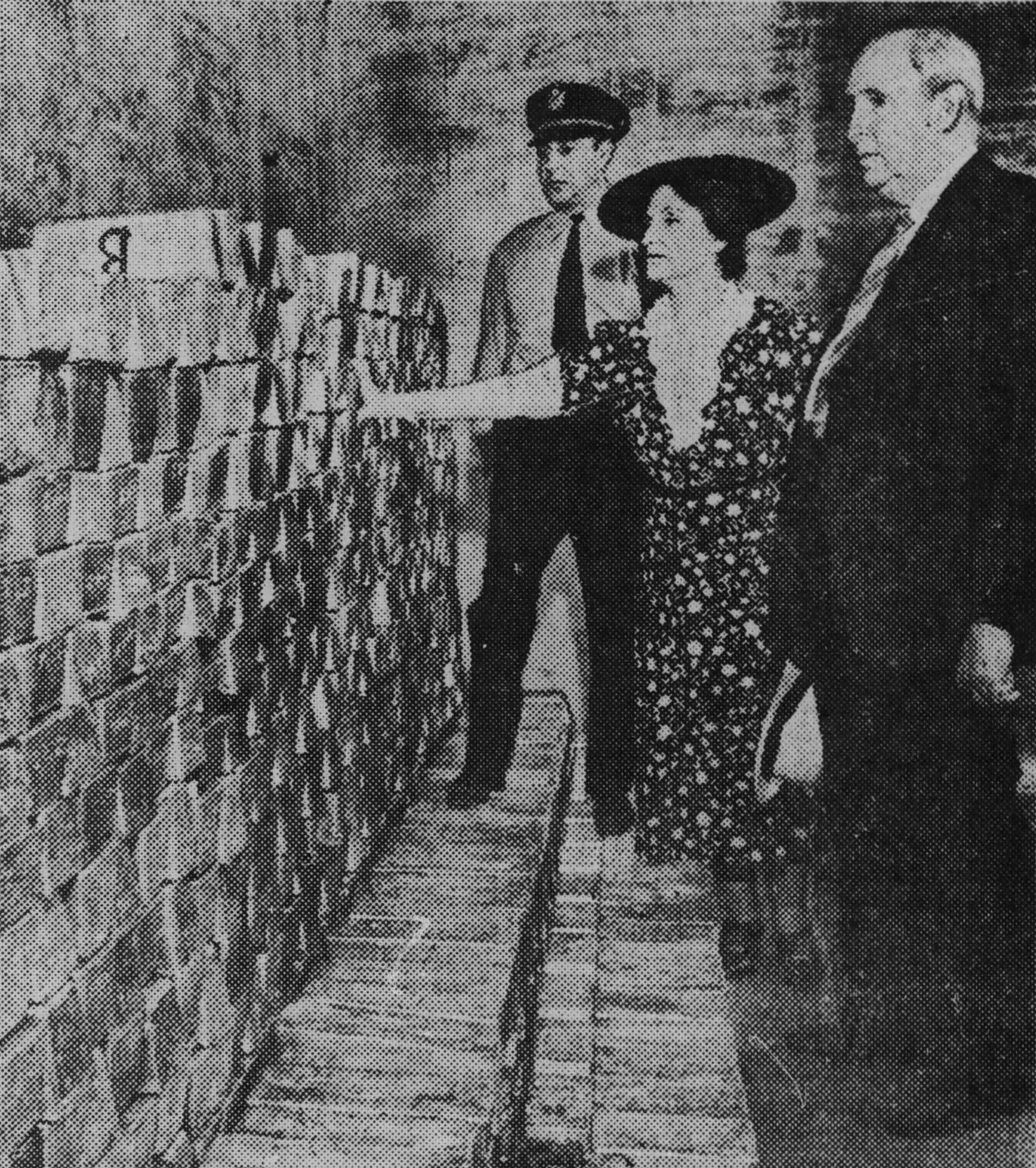
Nellie Tayloe Ross inspects silver arriving at the West Point Mint in 1938

=== Appointment by FDR ===
U.S. President Franklin D. Roosevelt appointed Ross as director of the U.S. Mint on May 3, 1933, making her the first woman to hold that position. Ross and the Mint's Assistant Director Mary Margaret O'Reilly, "the Sweetheart of the Treasury" who had worked at the Mint since 1904, had mutual suspicions to overcome.

Ross, who had endured poor relations with Eleanor Roosevelt and others on FDR's campaign, did not trust the career staff. O'Reilly saw another political appointee with no experience at the Mint Bureau replacing Robert J. Grant, who had been Denver Mint superintendent before his directorship. After a brief period, the two women came to appreciate each other's merits.

=== Tenure ===
Ross and O'Reilly soon came to the usual division of labor between director and assistant: the director would handle public affairs and make policy decisions as needed, while the assistant dealt with the day-to-day business of the bureau. Ross undertook a heavy travel schedule, visiting Mint facilities, making speeches backing Roosevelt, and campaigning for Democratic candidates in Wyoming. This left O'Reilly running the Washington office as acting director.

The two women carried on a businesslike but warm correspondence during these times, with O'Reilly writing to Ross, who had embarked on a tour of the mints, "I am so anxious to have your mind at ease about the office here [in Washington] that I have resorted to rather frequent telegrams. They are so much more direct and up to date than letters ... my love to you and every good wish for the success of your visits to our beloved mint institutions."

Teva J. Scheer, biographer of Ross, suggests that O'Reilly would have found Ross's reports from the field valuable. They showed how the Mint recovered from the initial years of the Depression, when relatively few coins were produced, to the mid-1930s, when strong demand for coinage led the bureau to run the mints with two or even three shifts.

=== O'Reilly's retirement ===
In 1935, O'Reilly reached the mandatory federal retirement age of 70. Ross requested that President Roosevelt exempt O'Reilly from mandatory retirement because her knowledge of bureau affairs was so extensive and was badly needed. A special order of President Roosevelt gave O'Reilly an extra year in the Mint Service. During the extension, Ross hired Frank Leland Howard of the University of Virginia, who had a background in accounting, as O'Reilly's prospective replacement. Howard replaced O'Reilly when she retired on October 29, 1938, after two more extensions.

=== Legacy ===
Ross's tenure saw the Mint in 1944 investigate how several 1933 double eagles, never officially released, had come onto the market. She is known for establishing the Franklin half dollar and starting the making of proof coins for public sale. Ross served five full terms until her retirement in 1953 and was succeeded by William H. Brett, whom President Dwight D. Eisenhower nominated in 1954.

== Later years and death ==
After her retirement, Ross contributed articles to various women's magazines and traveled extensively. She made her last trip to Wyoming in 1972 at the age of 96. Five years later, she died in Washington, D.C., at the age of 101. At the time of her death, she was the oldest ex-governor in the United States. She is interred in the family plot in Lakeview Cemetery in Cheyenne.

== Commemoration ==
Mark Gordon, then the governor of Wyoming, proclaimed January 5th 2025 as Nellie Tayloe Ross Day, in recognition of the hundredth anniversary of Ross becoming governor.

== See also ==
- List of female governors in the United States

== Sources ==
- Burdette, Roger (Winter 2014). "The Women Who Ran the Mint". Journal of Numismatic Research. Seneca Mill Press LLC: 4–56.
- Scheer, Teva J. (2005). Governor Lady: The Life and Times of Nellie Tayloe Ross. University of Missouri Press. ISBN 978-0-8262-1626-7.

Party political offices
Preceded by William B. Ross	Democratic nominee for Governor of Wyoming; 1924, 1926	Succeeded by Leslie A. Miller
Political offices
Preceded by Frank Lucas	Governor of Wyoming; 1925–1927	Succeeded by Frank Emerson
Government offices
Preceded by Robert J. Grant	Director of the United States Mint; 1933–1953	Succeeded by William H. Brett
