= William B. Ross =

12th Governor of Wyoming, United States (from 1923 to 1924)

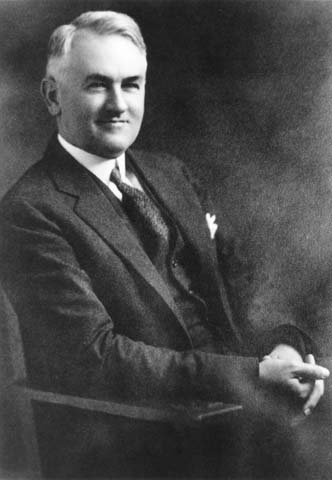

12th Governor of Wyoming
- In office January 1, 1923 – October 2, 1924
- Preceded by: Robert D. Carey
- Succeeded by: Frank Lucas

Personal details
- Born: William Bradford Ross; December 4, 1873 Dover, Tennessee, U.S.
- Died: October 2, 1924 (aged 50) Cheyenne, Wyoming, U.S.
- Resting place: Lakeview Cemetery, Cheyenne, Wyoming, U.S.
- Party: Democratic
- Spouse: Nellie Tayloe (m. 1902)
- Children: 3
- Parents: Ambrose B. Ross (father); Sue Gray (mother)
- Relatives: Nellie Tayloe Sanders (great-granddaughter)
- Education: Peabody Normal School

William Bradford Ross (December 4, 1873 – October 2, 1924) was an American politician who served as the 12th governor of Wyoming as a Democrat.

== Life ==
Ross was born in Dover, Tennessee, on December 4, 1873, to Ambrose B. Ross and Sue Gray and later attended the Peabody Normal School. He met Nellie Davis Tayloe while she was visiting her relatives in Dover and after moving to Cheyenne, Wyoming in 1901 they married on September 11, 1902, in Omaha, Nebraska, and later had three children (twins James Ambrose and George Tayloe, Alfred Duff).

From 1906 to 1907 he served as Laramie County's prosecuting attorney and in 1910 he unsuccessfully ran for Wyoming's at-large congressional seat. In 1918 he mounted a primary campaign against incumbent Governor Frank L. Houx, but was defeated. From 1910 to 1922, Ross served on the Wyoming Board of Law Examiners, including terms as the board's president.

=== Governor ===
During the 1922 gubernatorial election the Republican Party was divided due to a contentious primary between Robert D. Carey and John W. Hay where Hay won by only 443 votes and by appealing to Carey's voters through his strong prohibition stances allowed him to narrowly defeat Hay by 723 votes. In June 1924 he served as one of Wyoming's delegates to the Democratic National Convention.

=== Death ===
On September 23, 1924, he gave a speech in favor of a severance tax constitutional amendment in Laramie and while being driven home became sick. It was discovered that he was suffering from phlebitis, but died on October 2, 1924, after suffering complications following an appendectomy that happened on September 25. Secretary of State Frank Lucas served as acting governor for three months until a special election was held where Ross's wife, Nellie Tayloe Ross, won and became the first female governor in the United States.

== Electoral history ==
William B. Ross electoral history

1910 Wyoming at-large Congressional District election
Party	Candidate	Votes	%	±%
Republican	Frank Wheeler Mondell	20,312	54.71%	−2.35%
Democratic	William B. Ross	14,659	39.48%	+3.16%
Socialist	J.B. Morgan	2,155	5.81%	−0.81%
Total votes		37,126	100.00%	

1918 Wyoming Gubernatorial Democratic primary
Party	Candidate	Votes	%
Democratic	Frank L. Houx (incumbent)	4,393	56.91%
Democratic	William B. Ross	3,326	43.09%
Total votes		7,719	100.00%

1922 Wyoming Gubernatorial Democratic primary
Party	Candidate	Votes	%
Democratic	William B. Ross	6,230	49.56%
Democratic	George E. Kindler	4,972	39.55%
Democratic	Frank C. McDowell	1,370	10.90%
Total votes		12,572	100.00%

1922 Wyoming Gubernatorial election
Party	Candidate	Votes	%	±%
Democratic	William B. Ross	31,110	50.03%	+6.13%
Republican	John W. Hay	30,387	48.87%	−7.24%
Write-in		687	1.11%	+1.11%
Total votes		62,184	100.00%	

Party political offices
Preceded by Frank L. Houx	Democratic nominee for Governor of Wyoming; 1922	Succeeded by Nellie Tayloe Ross
Political offices
Preceded by Robert D. Carey	Governor of Wyoming; January 1, 1923 – October 2, 1924	Succeeded by Frank E. Lucas
