= 1899 United States gubernatorial elections =

- November 7, 1899; April 5, 1899 (RI)

7 governorships
	Majority party	Minority party
Party	Republican	Democratic
Seats before	25	16
Seats after	24	17
Seat change	▼1	▲1
Seats up	6	1
Seats won	5	2
	Third party	Fourth party
Party	Populist	Silver
Seats before	3	1
Seats after	3	1
Seat change	Steady	Steady
Seats up	0	0
Seats won	0	0
- Democratic gain Democratic hold Republican gain Republican hold

United States gubernatorial elections were held in 1899, in seven states.

Kentucky, Maryland and Mississippi held their gubernatorial elections in odd numbered years, every 4 years, preceding the United States presidential election year. Massachusetts and Rhode Island both elected their respective governors to single-year terms. They would abandon this practice in 1920 and 1912, respectively. Iowa and Ohio at this time held gubernatorial elections in every odd numbered year.

== Results ==
State	Incumbent	Party	Status	Opposing candidates
Iowa	Leslie M. Shaw	Republican	Re-elected, 55.26%	Frederick Edward White (Democratic) (Note: Some sources indicate White ran under a fusion ticket between the Democrats and the Populist Party) 42.30% Marshall W. Atwood (Prohibition) 1.76% Charles Lloyd (Populist) 0.39% M. J. Kremer (Socialist Labor) 0.18% C. C. Heacock (United Christian) 0.11%
Kentucky	William O'Connell Bradley (Note: Glashan, pp.104-105, and OurCampaigns claim that Bradley resigned on 4 March 1899 and was succeeded by Taylor. Both state that Taylor was Lieutenant Governor at the time whereas in fact he was Attorney General. No other sources support this suggested course of events.)	Republican	Term-limited, Republican victory	William S. Taylor (Republican) 47.82% (Note: Disputed election. Taylor was inaugurated on 12 December 1899 but the Democratic-dominated General Assembly overturned the result. Goebel, who was shot on 30 January 1900, was sworn into office on his deathbed the next day. On Goebel's death on 3 February, the Lieutenant Governor, J. C. W. Beckham became Governor.); William Goebel (Democratic) 47.23% John Y. Brown (Independent Democrat) 3.47% John G. Blair (Populist) 0.75% O. T. Wallace (Prohibition) 0.58% Alfred Schmitz (Socialist Labor) 0.15%
Maryland	Lloyd Lowndes Jr.	Republican	Defeated, 46.29%	John Walter Smith (Democratic) 51.12% James Swann (Prohibition) 2.10% Levin Thomas Jones (Social Democrat) 0.17% John A. Rugemer (Socialist Labor) 0.17% William Nevin Hill (Union Reform) 0.15%
Massachusetts	Roger Wolcott	Republican	Retired, Republican victory	Winthrop M. Crane (Republican) 56.46% Robert Treat Paine (Democratic) 34.70% George R. Peare (Socialist Labor) 3.60% Winfield P. Porter (Social Democrat) 2.76% Albert B. Coats (Prohibition) 2.47%
Mississippi	Anselm J. McLaurin	Democratic	Term-limited, Democratic victory	Andrew H. Longino (Democratic) 87.40% R. K. Prewitt (Populist) 12.60%
Ohio	Asa S. Bushnell	Republican	Retired, Republican victory	George K. Nash (Republican) 45.94% John Roll McLean (Democratic) 40.54% Samuel M. Jones (Independent) 11.75% Seth H. Ellis (Union Reform) 0.86% George M. Hanmell (Prohibition) 0.64% Robert Bondlow (Socialist Labor) 0.27%
Rhode Island (held, 5 April 1899)	Elisha Dyer Jr.	Republican	Re-elected, 56.36%	George W. Greene (Democratic) 33.86% Thomas F. Herrick (Socialist Labor) 6.82% Joseph A. Peckham (Prohibition) 2.97%

== Bibliography ==
- Glashan, Roy R. (1979). American Governors and Gubernatorial Elections, 1775-1978. Meckler Books. ISBN 0-930466-17-9.
- Gubernatorial Elections, 1787-1997. Washington, D.C.: Congressional Quarterly Inc. 1998. ISBN 1-56802-396-0.
- Dubin, Michael J. (2014). United States Gubernatorial Elections, 1861-1911: The Official Results by State and County. Jefferson, North Carolina: McFarland. ISBN 978-0-7864-4722-0.
- The World Almanac and Encyclopedia, 1900. New York, NY: The Press Publishing Co. 1900.
- Rhoades, Henry Eckford, ed. (1900). The Tribune Almanac and Political Register, 1900. New York, NY: The Tribune Association.
