= 1897 United States gubernatorial elections =

- November 2, 1897; April 7, 1897 (RI)

5 governorships
	Majority party	Minority party
Party	Republican	Democratic
Seats before	24	16
Seats after	24	16
Seat change	Steady	Steady
Seats up	4	1
Seats won	4	1
	Third party	Fourth party
Party	Populist	Silver
Seats before	4	1
Seats after	4	1
Seat change	Steady	Steady
Seats up	0	0
Seats won	0	0
- Democratic gain Democratic hold Republican gain Republican hold

United States gubernatorial elections were held in 1897, in five states.

Virginia holds its gubernatorial elections in odd numbered years, every 4 years, following the United States presidential election year. Massachusetts and Rhode Island at this time held gubernatorial elections every year. They would abandon this practice in 1920 and 1912, respectively. Iowa and Ohio at this time held gubernatorial elections in every odd numbered year.

== Results ==
State	Incumbent	Party	Status	Opposing candidates
Iowa	Francis M. Drake	Republican	Retired, Republican victory	Leslie M. Shaw (Republican) 51.27% Frederick Edward White (Democratic) (Note: White ran under a fusion ticket between the Democrats, the Populists, and the Silver Republican Party) 44.46% S. P. Leland (Prohibition) 1.88% Charles A. Lloyd (Midroad-Populist) 1.21% John Cliggett (National Democratic) 0.98% M. J. Kremer (Socialist Labor) 0.20%
Massachusetts	Roger Wolcott	Republican	Re-elected, 61.19%	George F. Williams (Democratic) 29.49% William Everett (National Democratic) 5.14% Thomas C. Brophy (Socialist Labor) 2.34% John A. Bascom (Prohibition) 1.83% Scattering 0.01%
Ohio	Asa S. Bushnell	Republican	Re-elected, 50.28%	Horace L. Chapman (Democratic) 46.99% John C. Holiday (Prohibition) 0.88% Jacob S. Coxey Sr. (Populist) 0.73% William Watkins (Socialist Labor) 0.50% John Richardson (Liberty) 0.36% Julius Dexter (National Democratic) 0.19% Samuel J. Lewis (Negro Protection) 0.06%
Rhode Island (held, 7 April 1897)	Charles W. Lippitt	Republican	Retired, Republican victory	Elisha Dyer Jr. (Republican) 58.11% Daniel T. Church (Democratic) 32.69% Thomas H. Peabody (Prohibition) 5.01% Franklin E. Burton (Socialist Labor) 3.31% John H. Larry (National Liberty) 0.88%
Virginia	Charles Triplett O'Ferrall	Democratic	Term-limited, Democratic victory	James Hoge Tyler (Democratic) 64.43% Patrick H. McCaull (Republican) 33.40% L. A. Cutler (Prohibition) 1.61% John J. Quantz (Socialist Labor) 0.31% James Seldon Cowden (Independent) 0.24%

== Bibliography ==
- Glashan, Roy R. (1979). American Governors and Gubernatorial Elections, 1775-1978. Meckler Books. ISBN 0-930466-17-9.
- Gubernatorial Elections, 1787-1997. Washington, D.C.: Congressional Quarterly Inc. 1998. ISBN 1-56802-396-0.
- Dubin, Michael J. (2014). United States Gubernatorial Elections, 1861-1911: The Official Results by State and County. Jefferson, North Carolina: McFarland. ISBN 978-0-7864-4722-0.
- The World Almanac and Encyclopedia, 1898. New York, NY: The Press Publishing Co. 1898.
- Rhoades, Henry Eckford, ed. (1898). The Tribune Almanac for 1898. New York, NY: The Tribune Association.
