= List of elections in 1899 =

The following elections occurred in the year 1899.

== Africa ==
=== Liberia ===
- 1899 Liberian general election

=== Southern Rhodesia ===
- 1899 Southern Rhodesian Legislative Council election

== Asia ==
=== Philippines ===
- 1899 Philippine local election

== Europe ==
- 1899 Bulgarian parliamentary election
- 1899 Greek parliamentary election
- 1899 Luxembourg general election
- 1899 Portuguese legislative election
- 1899 Spanish general election
- 1899 Swedish general election
- 1899 Swiss federal election

=== United Kingdom ===
- 1899 Antrim South by-election
- 1899 Aylesbury by-election
- 1899 Birmingham North by-election
- 1899 Bow and Bromley by-election
- 1899 Clackmannanshire and Kinross-shire by-election
- 1899 Clitheroe by-election
- 1899 Cork City by-election
- 1899 Croydon by-election
- 1899 East Denbighshire by-election
- 1899 East Limerick by-election
- 1899 Edinburgh East by-election
- 1899 Edinburgh South by-election
- 1899 Elland by-election
- 1899 Epsom by-election
- 1899 Forfarshire by-election
- 1899 Glasgow Central by-election
- 1899 Harrow by-election
- 1899 High Peak by-election
- 1899 Hythe by-election
- 1899 Kirkdale by-election
- 1899 Merionethshire by-election
- 1899 North Antrim by-election
- 1899 North Norfolk by-election
- 1899 North Sligo by-election
- 1899 Northwest Lanarkshire by-election
- 1899 Oldham by-election
- 1899 Osgoldcross by-election
- 1899 Oxford University by-election
- 1899 Rotherham by-election
- 1899 Sheffield Attercliffe by-election
- 1899 South Armagh by-election
- 1899 South Kilkenny by-election
- 1899 Southport by-election
- 1899 St Pancras East by-election
- 1899 Stratford-on-Avon by-election
- 1899 Tamworth by-election
- 1899 West Clare by-election

== North America ==
=== Canada ===
- 1899 Edmonton municipal election
- 1899 Manitoba general election
- 1899 New Brunswick general election

=== United States ===
==== United States gubernatorial ====
- 1899 Iowa gubernatorial election
- 1899 Kentucky gubernatorial election
- 1899 Maryland gubernatorial election
- 1899 Massachusetts gubernatorial election
- 1899 Mississippi gubernatorial election
- 1899 Ohio gubernatorial election
- 1899 Rhode Island gubernatorial election
- 1899 United States gubernatorial elections

==== United States House of Representatives ====
- 1899 United States House of Representatives elections

==== United States Senate ====
- 1898–99 United States Senate elections
- 1899–1900 United States Senate elections
- 1899 United States Senate election in Massachusetts
- 1899 United States Senate election in New York
- 1899 United States Senate election in Pennsylvania
- 1899 United States Senate election in Wisconsin

==== United States mayoral elections ====
- 1899 Boston mayoral election
- 1899 Chicago mayoral election
- 1899 Philadelphia mayoral election
- 1899 San Diego mayoral election

==== Other ====
- 1899 Iowa Senate election
- 1899 New York state election

== Oceania ==
=== Australia ===
- 1899 South Australian colonial election

=== New Zealand ===
- 1899 New Zealand general election
- 1899 City of Wellington by-election

== South America ==
=== Peru ===
- 1899 Peruvian presidential election

== See also ==
- Category:1899 elections
