= List of elections in 1897 =

The following elections occurred in the year 1897.

== Africa ==
=== Liberia ===
- 1897 Liberian general election

== Asia ==
=== The Philippines ===
- 1897 Philippine Supreme Council elections

== Europe ==
=== Austria-Hungary ===
- Election of the Imperial Council (Austria) → de:Reichsratswahl 1897
- Cisleithanian legislative election

=== Croatia ===
- 1897 Croatian parliamentary election

=== The Netherlands ===
- 1897 Dutch general election

=== Italy ===
- 1897 Italian general election

=== Norway ===
- 1897 Norwegian parliamentary election

=== Portugal ===
- 1897 Portuguese legislative election

== North America ==
=== Canada ===
- 1897 Edmonton municipal election
- 1897 Newfoundland general election
- 1897 Nova Scotia general election
- 1897 Prince Edward Island general election
- 1897 Quebec general election

=== United States ===
- 1897 New York state election

==== United States gubernatorial ====
- 1897 Iowa gubernatorial election
- 1897 Massachusetts gubernatorial election
- 1897 Ohio gubernatorial election
- 1897 Rhode Island gubernatorial election
- 1897 United States gubernatorial elections
- 1897 Virginia gubernatorial election

==== United States House of Representatives ====
- 1897 United States House of Representatives elections

==== United States Senate ====
- 1896–97 United States Senate elections
- 1897–98 United States Senate elections
- United States Senate election in California, 1897
- United States Senate election in Idaho, 1897
- United States Senate election in New York, 1897
- United States Senate election in Pennsylvania, 1897
- United States Senate special election in South Carolina, 1897
- United States Senate election in Wisconsin, 1897

==== United States mayoral elections ====
- 1897 Boston mayoral election
- 1897 Chicago mayoral election
- 1897 New York City mayoral election
- 1897 San Diego mayoral election
- 1897 Worcester, Massachusetts, mayoral election

== Oceania ==
=== Australia ===
- 1897 Western Australian colonial election

=== New Zealand ===
- 1897 Awarua by-election
- 1897 City of Dunedin by-election
- 1898 Mataura by-election
- 1897 Wellington Suburbs by-election

== See also ==
- Category:1897 elections
