= East High Street Historic District =

East High Street Historic District may refer to:

- East High Street Historic District (Mount Vernon, Ohio), a National Register of Historic Places listing in Knox County, Ohio
- East High Street Historic District (Springfield, Ohio)
