= Lyman J. Gage =

American financier and 42nd Secretary of the Treasury (1836–1927)

Lyman Gage
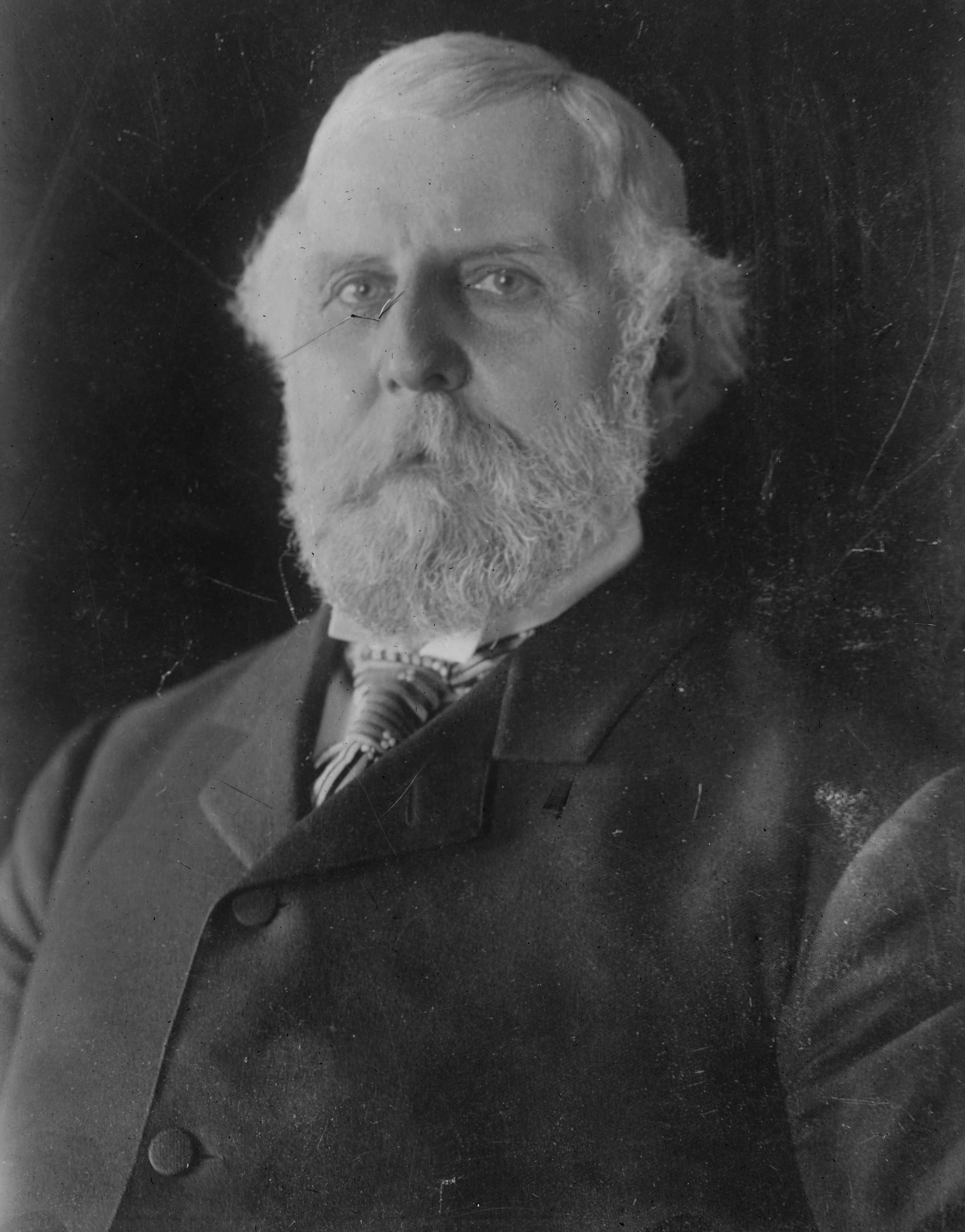

42nd United States Secretary of the Treasury
- In office March 6, 1897 – January 31, 1902
- President: William McKinley; Theodore Roosevelt
- Preceded by: John G. Carlisle
- Succeeded by: Leslie Shaw

Personal details
- Born: Lyman Judson Gage; June 28, 1836 DeRuyter, New York, U.S.
- Died: January 26, 1927 (aged 90) San Diego, California, U.S.
- Party: Republican (Before 1884, 1896–1902); Democratic (1884–1896)
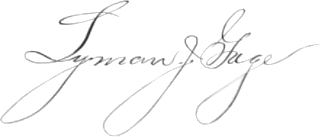
- Signature

Lyman Judson Gage (June 28, 1836 – January 26, 1927) was an American financier who served as the 42nd United States Secretary of the Treasury in the cabinets of William McKinley and Theodore Roosevelt.

== Biography ==
=== Early life ===
He was born in DeRuyter, New York, educated at an academy in Rome, New York, and at the age of 17 became a bank clerk. In 1853 he moved to Chicago, served for three years as bookkeeper, and in 1858 entered the Merchants Loan and Trust Company, where he was cashier in 1861–1868. Afterwards he became successively assistant cashier, vice-president, and president of the First National Bank of Chicago, one of the strongest financial institutions in the Midwestern United States.

He was chosen in 1890 to be president of the board of directors of the World's Columbian Exposition, the successful financing of which was due mostly to him. Following the exposition, he became president of the newly formed Chicago Civic Federation, which sought to reform city governance.

=== Political career ===
In politics he was originally a Republican, and was a delegate to the national convention of the party in 1880, and chairman of its finance committee.

In 1884, however, he supported Grover Cleveland for the presidency, and came to be looked upon as a Democrat. In 1892 President Cleveland, after his second election, offered Gage the post of secretary of the treasury, but Gage declined the offer. In the free-silver campaign of 1896, Gage labored effectively for the election of Republican candidate William McKinley, and from March 1897 until January 1902 he served as Secretary of the Treasury in the cabinets successively of Presidents McKinley and Theodore Roosevelt.

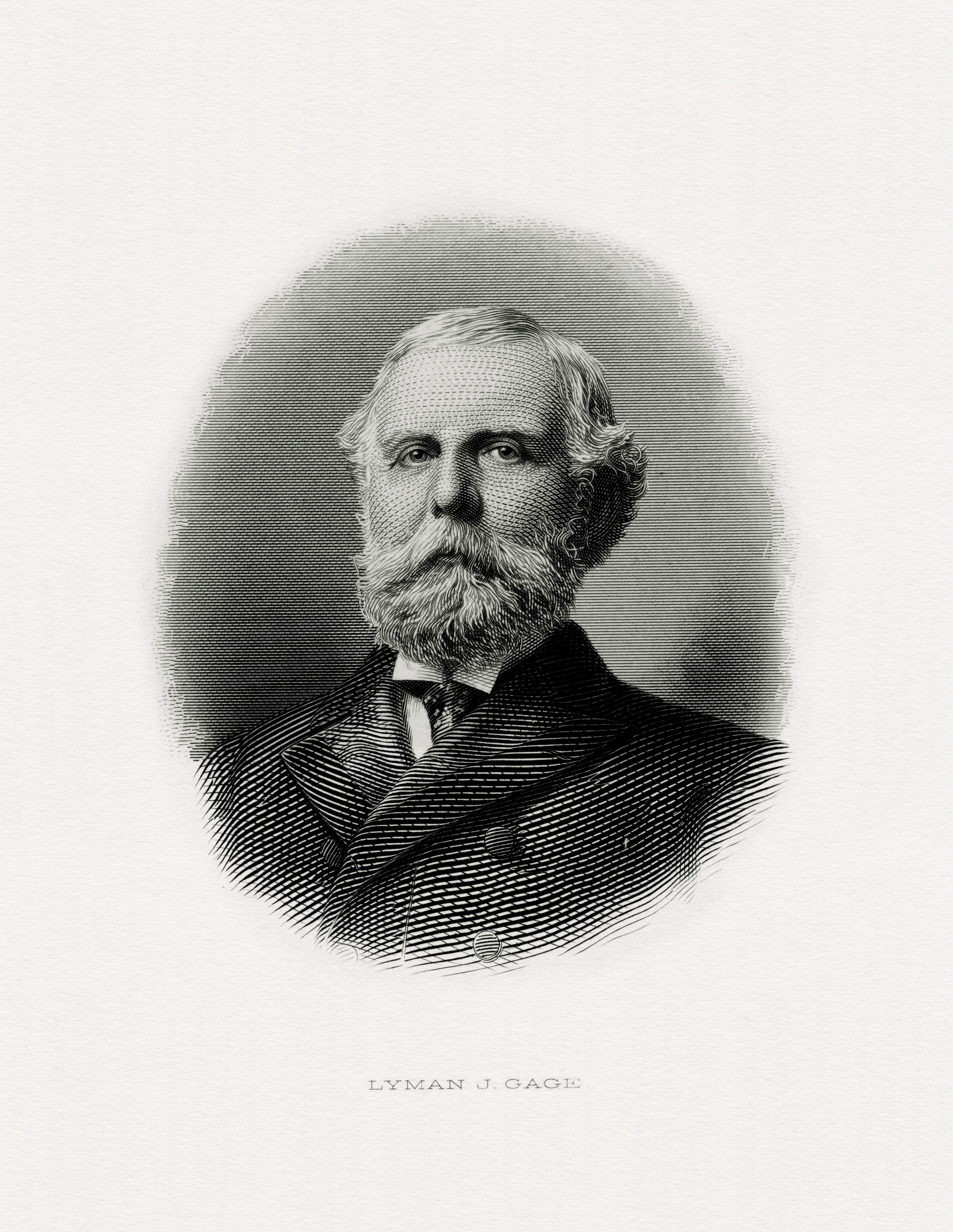
Bureau of Engraving and Printing portrait of Gage as Secretary of the Treasury

As Secretary of the Treasury, Gage was influential in securing passage of the Gold Standard Act of March 14, 1900, which reestablished a currency backed solely by gold. Since this limited the amount of currency in circulation, it initiated a period, continuing until 1912, in which the Secretary of the Treasury was obliged to interact in the money market by introducing into circulation the Treasury surplus. The inability of the Treasury to respond to the needs of the market as well as the perceived need for a currency which would expand and contract with the needs of the nation, led to the creation of the Federal Reserve in 1913 to regulate the money market.

Gage resigned in 1902 to become a banker in New York. From April 1902 until 1906 he was president of the United States Trust Company in New York City. His administration of the treasury department, through a more than ordinarily trying period, was marked by a conservative policy, looking toward the strengthening of the gold standard, the securing of greater flexibility in the currency, and a more perfect adjustment of the relations between the government and the National banks.

Lyman J. Gage was instrumental in creating the San Diego Panama–California Exposition of 1915. Later he was president of the committee to preserve the Expo's characteristic buildings in Balboa Park.

=== Final years ===
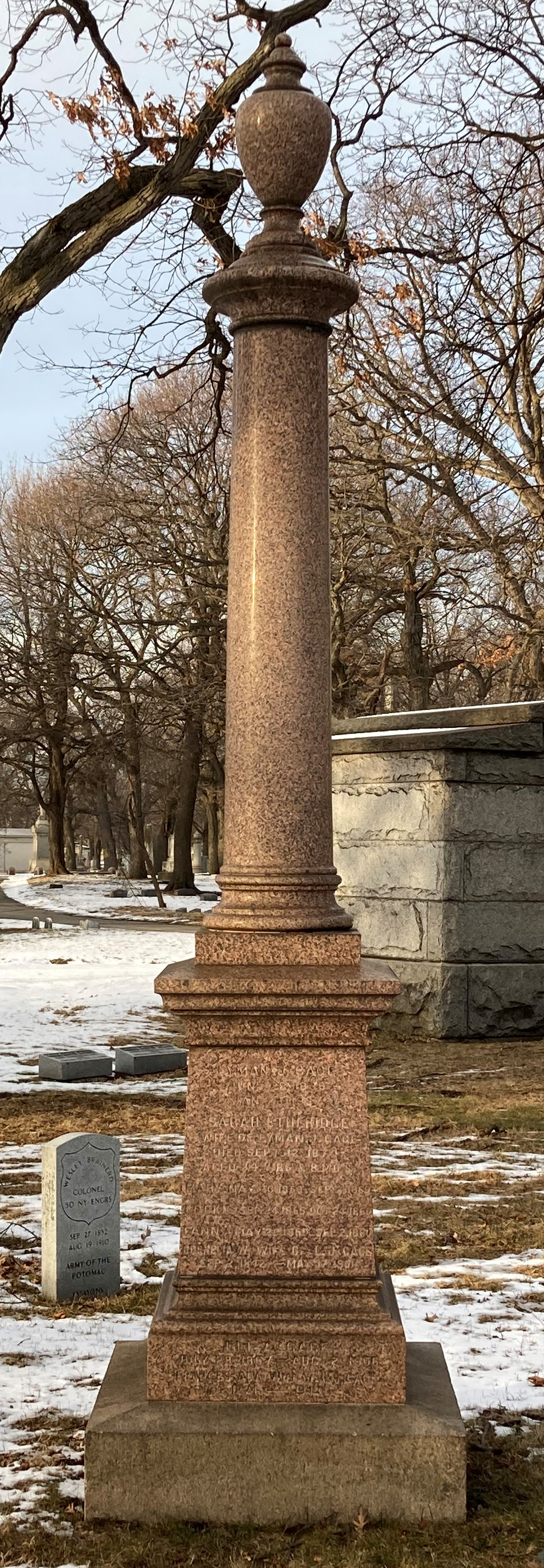
Gage's grave at Rosehill Cemetery

Gage was one of the 30 founding members of the Simplified Spelling Board, founded in 1906 by Andrew Carnegie to make English easier to learn and understand through changes in the orthography of the English language.

He died of pneumonia in San Diego, California in 1927, and is buried at Rosehill Cemetery in Chicago.

== Private life ==
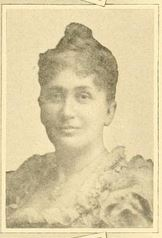
Mrs. Cornelia Gage

Lyman Gage married Sarah Etheridge in 1864, and the couple had four children: Locke, Eli Alexander, Fanny, and Mary; only Eli survived to adulthood. Sarah died in 1874, when son Eli was 7 years old. Eli Gage married Sophie R. Weare in 1893 in Iowa, but she committed suicide in Seattle in 1906 leaving her husband and two young sons, Lyman J. Gage II (1896-1954) and John Weare Gage (1900-1962). After Sarah's death, Lyman Gage married Cornelia Lansing, who died childless in 1901. In the late 1910s, Gage remarried a third time with Frances Ballou, and the two had a son, Lyman Judson. Frances died in 1943, around 16 years after Gage's death.

In 1906, Gage indulged his longtime interest in metaphysical phenomena by purchasing property on and subsequently living at Lomaland, a Theosophist retreat in Southern California. Though this came as something of a shock to the American public, those who knew him privately were not surprised, as Gage had previously studied spiritualism, astrology, and prophesied the death of his own brother through a "psychic flash". His move to Lomaland came around the same time as his sister’s death in 1908, who was raising her three grandchildren including Sibyl Anikeef. Gage raised these three children after 1910.

== Sources ==
Political offices
Preceded by John G. Carlisle	U.S. Secretary of the Treasury; Served under: William McKinley, Theodore Roosevelt; March 6, 1897 – January 31, 1902	Succeeded by Leslie M. Shaw
