= John F. Lacey =

American politician (1841–1913)

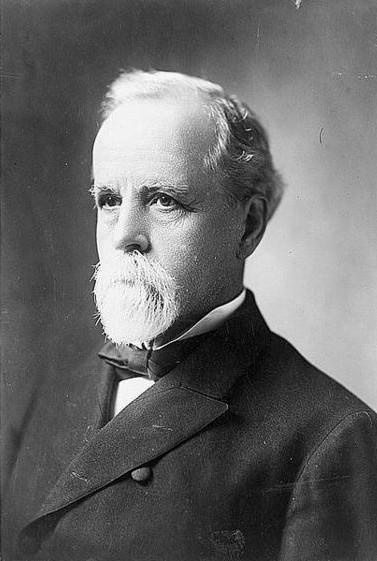
- Lacey, c. 1903

Member of the U.S. House of Representatives from Iowa's 6th district
- In office March 4, 1889 – March 3, 1891
- Preceded by: James B. Weaver
- Succeeded by: Frederick E. White
- In office March 4, 1893 – March 3, 1907
- Preceded by: Frederick E. White
- Succeeded by: Daniel W. Hamilton

Member of the Iowa House of Representatives
- In office 1870

Personal details
- Born: May 30, 1841 New Martinsville, Virginia (now West Virginia)
- Died: September 29, 1913 (aged 72) Oskaloosa, Iowa
- Party: Republican
- Profession: Attorney

Military service
- Branch/service: Union Army
- Rank: Lieutenant
- Unit: Company C, 33rd Iowa Infantry Regiment; Company H, 3rd Iowa Infantry Regiment
- Battles/wars: American Civil War

John Fletcher Lacey (May 30, 1841 – September 29, 1913) was an eight-term Republican United States congressman from Iowa's 6th congressional district. He was also the author of the Lacey Act of 1900, which made it a crime to ship illegal game across state lines and to import injurious wildlife species, and the Lacey Act of 1907, which further regulated the handling of tribal funds. As the first federal conservation law, the Lacey Act of 1900 remains one of the foundations of conservation law enforcement.

== Background and Civil War service ==
Lacey was born in New Martinsville, Virginia (now West Virginia). He moved to Iowa in 1855 with his parents, who settled in Oskaloosa. He attended the common schools and pursued classical studies. He also engaged in agricultural pursuits, and learned the trades of bricklaying and plastering.

In the spring of 1861, when Lacey was twenty years old, the American Civil War began. Lacey joined an infantry in the Union Army in May 1861. He initially enlisted in Company H, 3rd Iowa Volunteer Infantry Regiment. During his time with the Third Iowa Infantry, he was captured at the Battle of Blue Mills. However, he was soon released on parole. He afterward served as sergeant major in Company D, 33rd Iowa Volunteer Infantry Regiment. According to the November 1903 Congressional Directory, Lacey was promoted to lieutenant and reassigned to Company C of that regiment, then "promoted to assistant adjutant-general on the staff of Brig. Gen. Samuel A. Rice, and after that officer was killed in battle was assigned to duty on the staff of Maj. Gen. Frederick Steele". He remained in this position until the end of the war.

As the war concluded, he studied law, was admitted to the bar in 1865, and began to practice law in Oskaloosa. Five years later, he became a member of the Iowa House of Representatives. He was elected to the Iowa House of Representatives for a term beginning in 1870. He was later elected to the Oskaloosa City Council in 1880, serving until 1883. He served one term as city solicitor.

In 1878, he founded the town of Lacey, Iowa, to route the Iowa Central Air Line Railroad.

On April 12, 1902, Lacey accepted membership into the Boone and Crockett Club, a wildlife conservation organization founded by Theodore Roosevelt in 1887.

== Congressional service ==
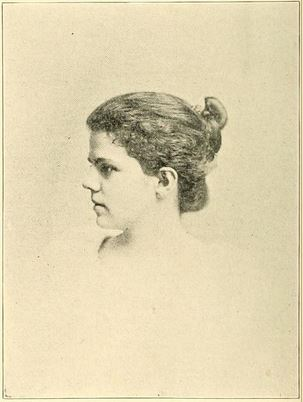
Bernice Lacey, daughter of John F. Lacey, in Washington, D.C.

In 1888, he was nominated by the Republican Party to challenge incumbent Greenback Party Congressman James Weaver, who was seeking re-election to his fourth term as representative of Iowa's 6th congressional district. Lacey unseated Weaver. Lacey served one term (as a member of the Fifty-first United States Congress), but was defeated in the 1890 Democratic landslide by Democrat Frederick Edward White. Two years later, however, Lacey reclaimed his seat from White, and served seven consecutive terms, as a member of the Fifty-third through the Fifty-ninth Congresses. He served twelve years as the chairman of the Committee on Public Lands, in the Fifty-fourth through Fifty-ninth Congresses. However, in 1906, when running for a ninth term, Lacey was unseated by Democrat Daniel W. Hamilton.

After leaving Congress, Lacey practiced law until his death in Oskaloosa on September 29, 1913.

== The Lacey Act of 1894 ==
Congressman Lacey was an enthusiastic defender of Yellowstone National Park and in 1894, in response to the inability of park administrators to punish poachers of the park's wildlife, Lacey sponsored legislation to give the Department of Interior authority arrest and prosecute law violators in the park. Although only known as the Lacey Act in the context of Yellowstone National Park, in May 1894 congress passed An Act To protect the birds and animals in Yellowstone National Park, and to punish crimes in said park, and for other purposes. which became the cornerstone of future law enforcement policies in the park.

== The Lacey Act of 1900 ==
Today, Congressman Lacey is most prominently known as the namesake of the Lacey Act of 1900. Lacey introduced the bill in the spring of 1900. It was signed into law on May 25, 1900, by President William McKinley after passing both houses of Congress. The Act is now codified in two statutes. One is 16 U.S.C. §§ 3371–3378 as amended, which protects both plants and wildlife by creating civil and criminal penalties for a wide array of violations. Most notably, the Act prohibits trade in wildlife, fish, and plants that have been illegally taken, possessed, transported or sold. The other statute is 18 U.S.C. §42, which prohibits the importation of injurious (harmful) wildlife species without a permit.

== The Lacey Act of 1907 ==
Another major legislative initiative—also known as "The Lacey Act," but approved in the lame duck session after his 1906 defeat and signed into law in his final week in Congress—made provision for the allotment of tribal funds to certain classes of Indians. These provisions were proposed after the passage of the Burke Act and the Dawes Act, both of which provided for the allotment of reservation lands to individual Indians, but not to communally owned trust funds. After much debate and several opposing arguments, President Theodore Roosevelt signed the bill into law on March 2, 1907.

== The Antiquities Act ==
Lacey is also significant in the history of the conservation movement for his role in writing (with the help of anthropologist Edgar Lee Hewett) and enacting the Antiquities Act. The act has been pivotal to the preservation of major archaeological sites in the Southwestern United States.

U.S. House of Representatives
Preceded by James Weaver	Member of the U.S. House of Representatives from Iowa's 6th congressional district 1889–1891	Succeeded by Frederick E. White
Preceded by Frederick E. White	Member of the U.S. House of Representatives from Iowa's 6th congressional district 1893–1907	Succeeded by Daniel W. Hamilton
