= 1898 Rhode Island gubernatorial election =

- April 6, 1898
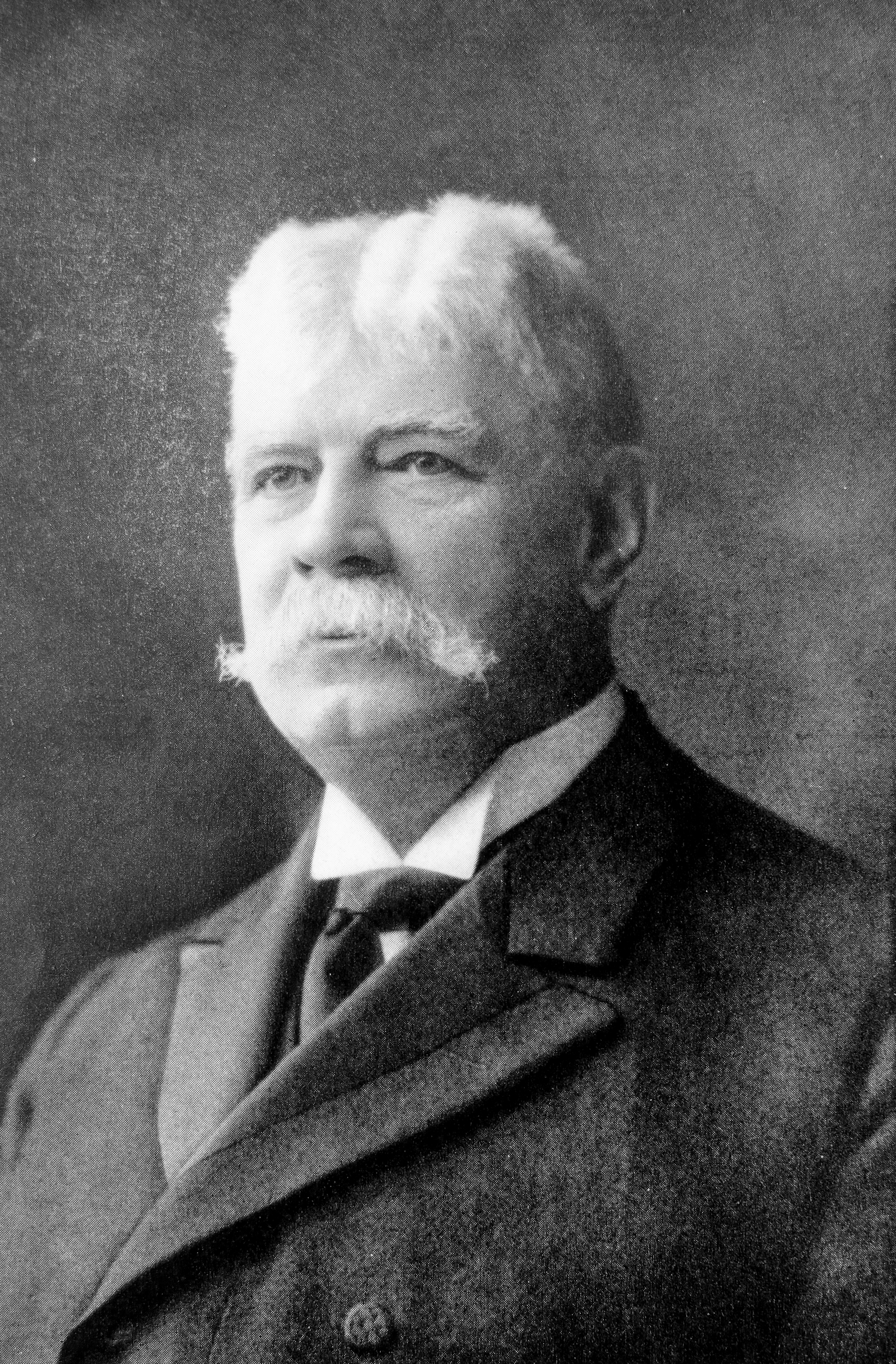

Nominee	Elisha Dyer Jr.	Daniel T. Church	James P. Reid
Party	Republican	Democratic	Socialist Labor
Popular vote	24,743	13,224	2,877
Percentage	57.74%	30.86%	6.71%
- Dyer: 40–50% 50–60% 60–70% 70–80% 80-90% Church: 40–50%
Governor before election
Elisha Dyer Jr.
Republican
Elected Governor
Elisha Dyer Jr.
Republican

The 1898 Rhode Island gubernatorial election was held on April 6, 1898. Incumbent Republican Elisha Dyer Jr. defeated Democratic nominee Daniel T. Church with 57.74% of the vote.

== General election ==
=== Candidates ===
Major party candidates

- Elisha Dyer Jr., Republican
- Daniel T. Church, Democratic

Other candidates

- James P. Reid, Socialist Labor
- Edwin A. Lewis, Prohibition

=== Results ===
1898 Rhode Island gubernatorial election
Party	Candidate	Votes	%	±%
Republican	Elisha Dyer Jr. (incumbent)	24,743	57.74%	
Democratic	Daniel T. Church	13,224	30.86%	
Socialist Labor	James P. Reid	2,877	6.71%	
Prohibition	Edwin A. Lewis	2,012	4.70%	
Majority		11,519		
Turnout				
Republican hold		Swing		
