= 1895 Ohio gubernatorial election =

- November 5, 1895
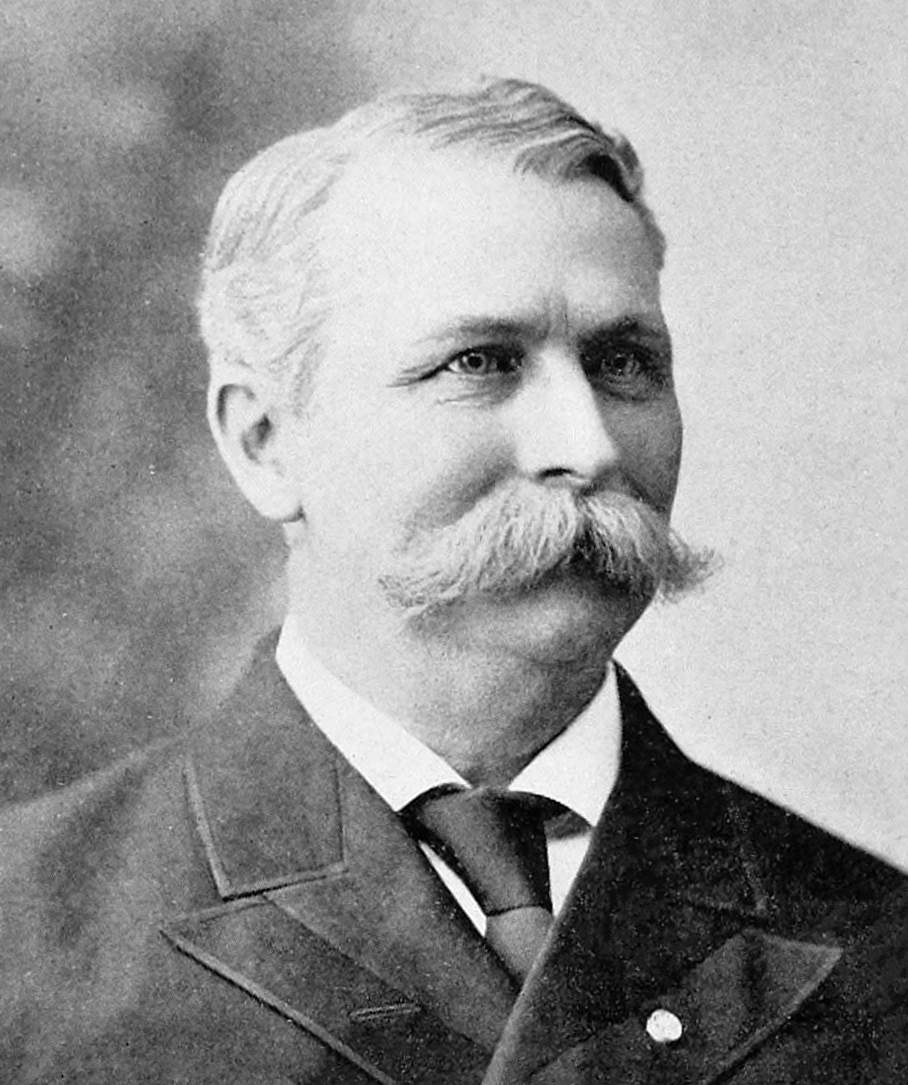

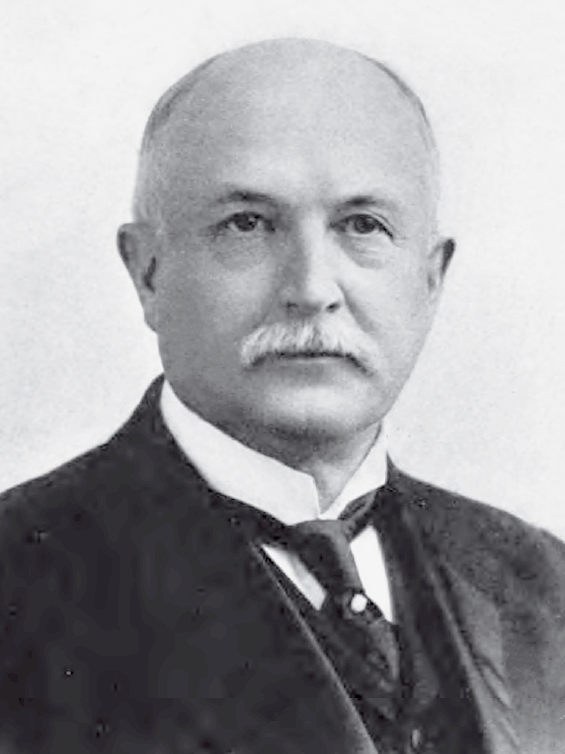

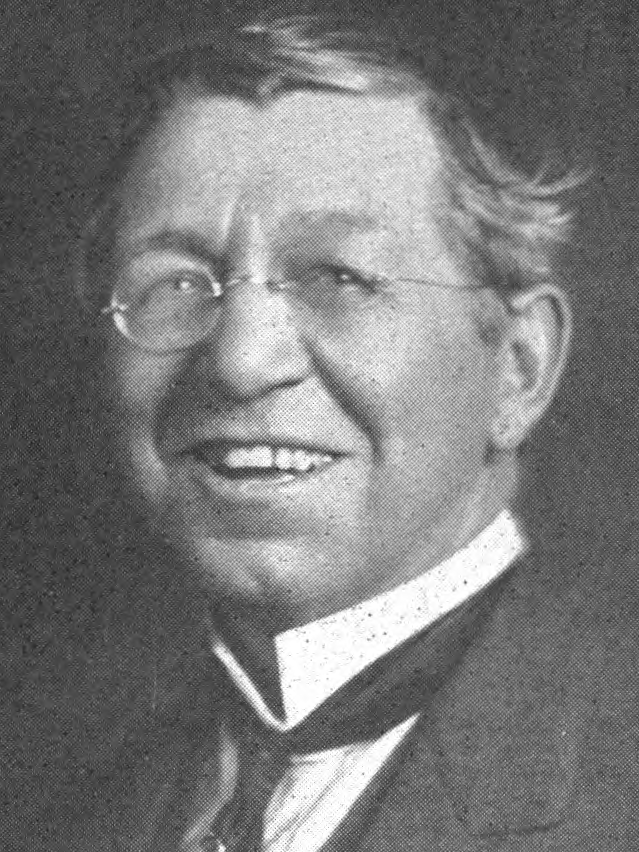
| Nominee | Asa S. Bushnell | James E. Campbell | Jacob S. Coxey Sr. |
| Party | Republican | Democratic | Populist |
| Popular vote | 427,141 | 334,519 | 52,675 |
| Percentage | 51.00% | 39.94% | 6.29% |
- County results Bushnell: 40–50% 50–60% 60–70% 70–80% Campbell: 40–50% 50–60% 60–70%
Governor before election
William McKinley
Republican
Elected Governor
Asa S. Bushnell
Republican

The 1895 Ohio gubernatorial election was held on November 5, 1895. Republican nominee Asa S. Bushnell defeated Democratic nominee James E. Campbell with 51.00% of the vote.

== General election ==
=== Candidates ===
Major party candidates

- Asa S. Bushnell, Republican
- James E. Campbell, Democratic

Other candidates

- Jacob S. Coxey Sr., People's
- Seth H. Ellis, Prohibition
- William Watkins, Socialist Labor

=== Results ===
1895 Ohio gubernatorial election
| Party | Candidate | Votes | % | ±% |
|---|---|---|---|---|
| Republican | Asa S. Bushnell | 427,141 | 51.00% | |
| Democratic | James E. Campbell | 334,519 | 39.94% | |
| Populist | Jacob S. Coxey Sr. | 52,675 | 6.29% | |
| Prohibition | Seth H. Ellis | 21,264 | 2.54% | |
| Socialist Labor | William Watkins | 1,867 | 0.22% | |
| Majority | | 92,622 | | |
| Turnout | | | | |
| Republican hold | | Swing | | |
