= 1908 Iowa gubernatorial election =

- November 3, 1908
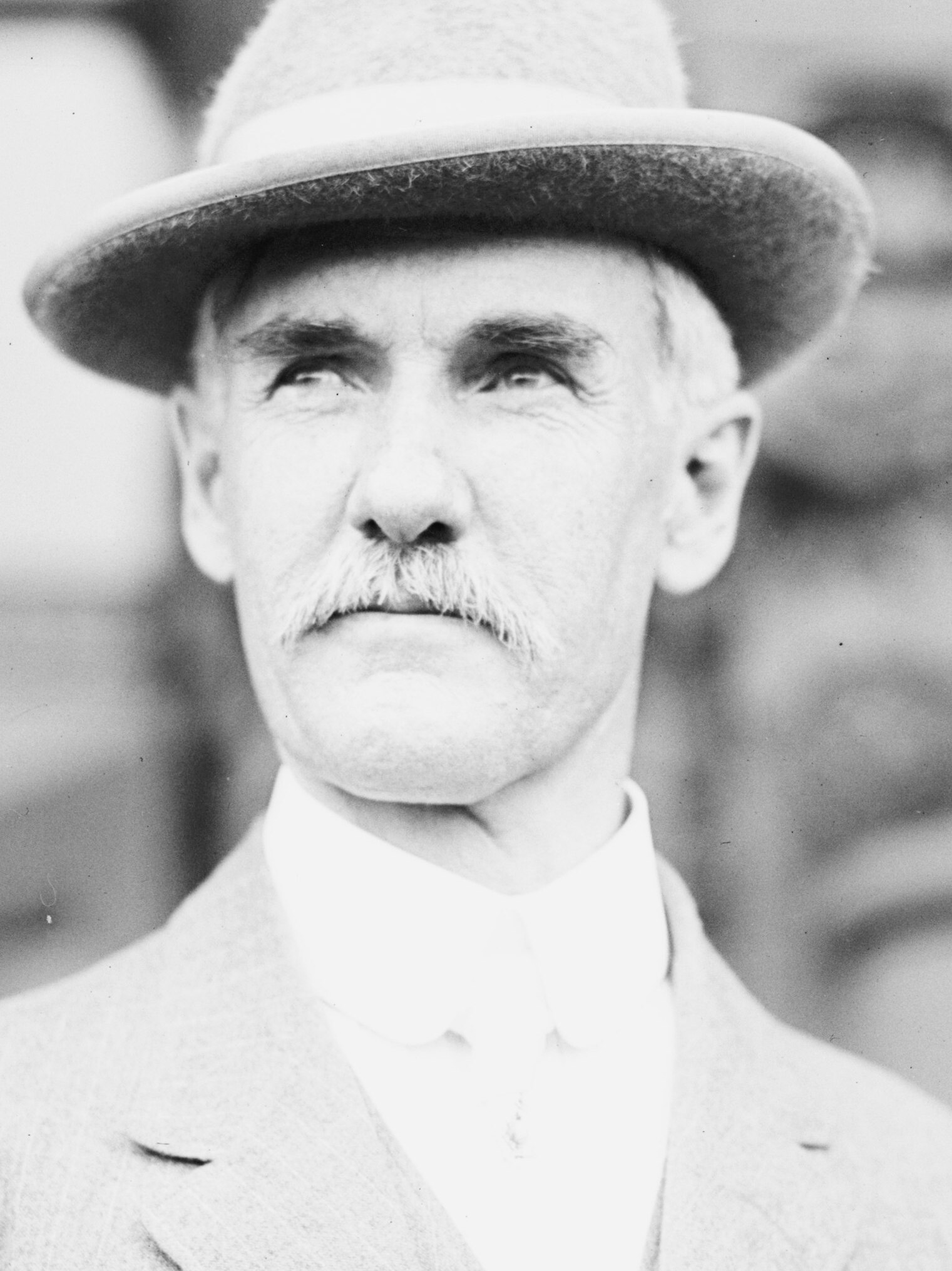

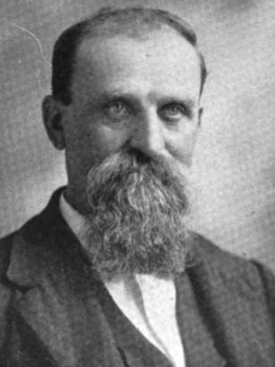
Nominee	Beryl F. Carroll	Frederick Edward White
Party	Republican	Democratic
Popular vote	256,980	196,929
Percentage	54.60%	41.84%
- County results Carroll: 40–50% 50–60% 60–70% 70–80% White: 40–50% 50–60% 60–70%
Governor before election
Albert B. Cummins
Republican
Elected Governor
Beryl F. Carroll
Republican

The 1908 Iowa gubernatorial election was held on November 3, 1908. Republican nominee Beryl F. Carroll defeated Democratic nominee Frederick Edward White with 54.60% of the vote.

== General election ==
=== Candidates ===
Major party candidates

- Beryl F. Carroll, Republican
- Frederick Edward White, Democratic

Other candidates

- K. W. Brown, Prohibition
- I. S. McCrillis, Socialist
- Luman Hamlin Weller, Independent
- D. C. Cowles, People's

=== Results ===
1908 Iowa gubernatorial election
Party	Candidate	Votes	%	±%
Republican	Beryl F. Carroll	256,980	54.60%	
Democratic	Frederick Edward White	196,929	41.84%	
Prohibition	K. W. Brown	9,118	1.94%	
Socialist	I. S. McCrillis	7,140	1.52%	
Independent	Luman Hamlin Weller	258	0.06%	
Populist	D. C. Cowles	228	0.05%	
Majority		60,051		
Turnout				
Republican hold		Swing		
