= 1899 Iowa Senate election =

- November 7, 1899

31 out of 50 seats in the Iowa State Senate 26 seats needed for a majority
	Majority party	Minority party
Party	Republican	Democratic
Last election	39	11
Seats after	35	15
Seat change	▼4	▲4

In the 1899 Iowa State Senate elections Iowa voters elected state senators in 31 of the state senate's 50 districts. State senators serve four-year terms in the Iowa State Senate.

A statewide map of the 50 state Senate districts in the 1899 elections is provided by the Iowa General Assembly here.

The 1899 elections occurred before primary elections were established in Iowa by the Primary Election Law in 1907. The general election took place on November 7, 1899.

Following the previous election, Republicans had control of the Iowa Senate with 39 seats to Democrats' 11 seats.

To claim control of the chamber from Republicans, the Democrats needed to net 15 Senate seats.

Republicans maintained control of the Iowa State Senate following the 1899 general election with the balance of power shifting to Republicans holding 35 seats and Democrats having 15 seats (a net gain of 4 seats for Democrats).

== Summary of Results ==
- Note: The holdover Senators not up for re-election are not listed on this table.

Senate District	Incumbent	Party	Elected Senator	Party
2nd	Thomas Bell	Rep	Henry H. Brighton	Rep
3rd	Beryl F. Carroll	Rep	Claude R. Porter	Dem
4th	Harvey L. Byers	Rep	Alexander Mardis	Rep
5th	George S. Allyn	Rep	George S. Allyn	Rep
6th	William O. Mitchell	Rep	Franklin L. Arthaud	Rep
8th	Joseph McKenna Junkin	Rep	Joseph McKenna Junkin	Rep
10th (Note: Election was held to fill a vacancy.)	David James Palmer	Rep	Amos Norris Alberson	Dem
11th	William Henry Berry	Rep	William Bell Tallman	Dem
14th	Lucian C. Blanchard	Rep	Lucian C. Blanchard	Rep
15th	Samuel Druet	Rep	Frederick Townsend	Dem
16th	Lucien Moody Kilburn	Rep	James Judson Crossley	Rep
17th	Albert C. Hotchkiss	Rep	Frank M. Hopkins	Rep
19th	Nathan Marsh Pusey	Rep	Arthur Sargent Hazelton	Rep
23rd	Alfred Hurst	Dem	Thomas Lambert	Dem
24th	Frederick O. Ellison	Rep	John T. Moffit	Rep
25th	Cyrus S. Ranck	Dem	George W. Ball	Dem
26th	Jeremiah Smyth Alexander	Rep	Jeremiah Smyth Alexander	Rep
27th	Thomas D. Healy	Rep	Thomas D. Healy	Rep
28th	James Loring Carney	Rep	John B. Classen	Rep
31st	Charles J. A. Ericson	Rep	Joseph Andrew Fitchpatrick	Rep
32nd	John Stillman Lothrop	Rep	Elbert Hamilton Hubbard	Rep
33rd	Daniel Hiel Young	Rep	Henry Joseph Griswold	Rep
35th	Francis Edward Malloy	Dem	Thomas Francis Nolan	Dem
36th	John Everall	Dem	Hiram Crusan Bishop	Dem
39th	George M. Craig	Rep	George M. Craig	Rep
40th	James Henry Trewin	Rep	James Henry Trewin	Rep
41st	Gilbert S. Gilbertson	Rep	James Albert Smith	Rep
43rd	William F. Harriman	Rep	William F. Harriman	Rep
46th	Alva C. Hobart	Rep	Alva C. Hobart	Rep
47th	Abraham B. Funk	Rep	Edsil Walter Bachman	Rep
49th	Henry Hospers	Rep	George William Lister	Rep

== Detailed Results ==
- NOTE: The districts that did not hold elections in 1899 are not listed here.

District	Party	Incumbent	Status	Party	Candidate	Votes	%
2nd	Republican	Thomas Bell	Republican Hold	Republican	Henry H. Brighton	4300	58.83%
2nd	Republican	Thomas Bell	Republican Hold	Unknown (Note: Iowa Official Register does not list a party for this candidate.)	Wiley A. Jones	3007	41.14%
2nd	Republican	Thomas Bell	Republican Hold	Unknown	John A. Ireland	1	0.01%
2nd	Republican	Thomas Bell	Republican Hold	Unknown	Cummings	1	0.01%
3rd	Republican	Beryl F. Carroll	Democratic Gain	Democratic	Claude R. Porter	4599	51.01%
3rd	Republican	Beryl F. Carroll	Democratic Gain	Unknown	Ellsworth Rominger	4359	48.35%
3rd	Republican	Beryl F. Carroll	Democratic Gain	Unknown	Zachariah T. Barker	57	0.63%
4th	Republican	Harvey L. Byers	Republican Hold	Republican	Alexander Mardis	3792	54.25%
4th	Republican	Harvey L. Byers	Republican Hold	Unknown	Walter H. Dewey	2980	42.63%
4th	Republican	Harvey L. Byers	Republican Hold	Unknown	J. M. Greenlee	218	3.12%
5th	Republican	George S. Allyn	Republican Hold	Republican	George S. Allyn (incumbent)	6202	55.52%
5th	Republican	George S. Allyn	Republican Hold	Unknown	V. R. McGinnis	4967	44.46%
5th	Republican	George S. Allyn	Republican Hold	Unknown	D. C. Cowles	2	0.02%
6th	Republican	William O. Mitchell	Republican Hold	Republican	F. L. Arthaud	3811	54.06%
6th	Republican	William O. Mitchell	Republican Hold	Unknown	M. M. Miller	3238	45.94%
8th	Republican	Joseph M. Junkin	Republican Hold	Republican	Joseph M. Junkin (incumbent)	4258	59.70%
8th	Republican	Joseph M. Junkin	Republican Hold	Unknown	Nelson C. Field	2874	40.30%
10th	Republican	David James Palmer	Democratic Gain	Democratic	Amos Norris Alberson	Unknown (Note: The Iowa Official Register does not include data on this race.)	Unknown
11th	Republican	William Henry Berry	Democratic Gain	Democratic	W. B. Tallman	3788	51.37%
11th	Republican	William Henry Berry	Democratic Gain	Republican	W. H. Berry (incumbent)	3586	48.63%
14th	Republican	Lucian C. Blanchard	Republican Hold	Republican	Lucian C. Blanchard (incumbent)	Unknown	Unknown
15th	Republican	Samuel Druet	Democratic Gain	Democratic	Fred Townsend	4266	48.83%
15th	Republican	Samuel Druet	Democratic Gain	Unknown	William A. Nichol	4166	47.68%
15th	Republican	Samuel Druet	Democratic Gain	Unknown	A. H. Humiston	252	2.88%
15th	Republican	Samuel Druet	Democratic Gain	Unknown	J. R. Norman	53	0.61%
16th	Republican	Lucien Moody Kilburn	Republican Hold	Republican	J. J. Crossley	4263	53.37%
16th	Republican	Lucien Moody Kilburn	Republican Hold	Unknown	K. R. Madden	3725	46.63%
17th	Republican	Albert C. Hotchkiss	Republican Hold	Republican	Frank M. Hopkins	6637	60.11%
17th	Republican	Albert C. Hotchkiss	Republican Hold	Unknown	W. J. Thompson	4404	39.88%
17th	Republican	Albert C. Hotchkiss	Republican Hold	Unknown	Nate Wright	1	0.01%
19th	Republican	Nathan Marsh Pusey	Republican Hold	Republican	Arthur Sargent Hazelton	Unknown	Unknown
23rd	Democratic	Alfred Hurst	Democratic Hold	Democratic	Thomas Lambert	Unknown	Unknown
24th	Republican	Frederick O. Ellison	Republican Hold	Republican	John G. Moffit	5105	54.44%
24th	Republican	Frederick O. Ellison	Republican Hold	Unknown	Charles A. Leffingwell	4273	45.56%
25th	Democratic	Cyrus S. Ranck	Democratic Hold	Democratic	George W. Ball	5132	52.08%
25th	Democratic	Cyrus S. Ranck	Democratic Hold	Unknown	C. S. Ranck (incumbent)	4687	47.56%
25th	Democratic	Cyrus S. Ranck	Democratic Hold	Unknown	William Spurrier	35	0.36%
26th	Republican	Jeremiah Smyth Alexander	Republican Hold	Republican	Jeremiah Smyth Alexander (incumbent)	Unknown	Unknown
27th	Republican	Thomas D. Healy	Republican Hold	Republican	Thomas D. Healy (incumbent)	5300	67.03%
27th	Republican	Thomas D. Healy	Republican Hold	Unknown	B. F. Freeburger	2606	32.96%
27th	Republican	Thomas D. Healy	Republican Hold	Unknown	C. J. Cole	1	0.01%
28th	Republican	James Loring Carney	Republican Hold	Republican	John B. Classen	Unknown	Unknown
31st	Republican	Charles J. A. Ericson	Republican Hold	Republican	J. A. Fitchpatrick	5784	65.80%
31st	Republican	Charles J. A. Ericson	Republican Hold	Unknown	Clark McClain	2687	30.57%
31st	Republican	Charles J. A. Ericson	Republican Hold	Unknown	John W. John	319	3.63%
32nd	Republican	John Stillman Lothrop	Republican Hold	Republican	Elbert H. Hubbard	Unknown	Unknown
33rd	Republican	Daniel Hiel Young	Republican Hold	Republican	H. J. Griswold	4534	59.51%
33rd	Republican	Daniel Hiel Young	Republican Hold	Unknown	T. J. Prowse	3085	40.49%
35th	Democratic	Francis Edward Malloy	Democratic Hold	Democratic	Thomas Francis Nolan	Unknown	Unknown
36th	Democratic	John Everall	Democratic Hold	Democratic	Hiram Crusan Bishop	Unknown	Unknown
39th	Republican	George M. Craig	Republican Hold	Republican	George M. Craig (incumbent)	3657	55.13%
39th	Republican	George M. Craig	Republican Hold	Unknown	C. W. Miller	2976	44.87%
40th	Republican	J. H. Trewin	Republican Hold	Republican	J. H. Trewin (incumbent)	5602	56.15%
40th	Republican	J. H. Trewin	Republican Hold	Unknown	Douglas Deremere	4374	43.85%
41st	Republican	Gilbert S. Gilbertson	Republican Hold	Republican	James A. Smith	4305	76.98%
41st	Republican	Gilbert S. Gilbertson	Republican Hold	Unknown	Edward Swensrud	1287	23.02%
43rd	Republican	W. F. Harriman	Republican Hold	Republican	W. F. Harriman (incumbent)	5874	73.72%
43rd	Republican	W. F. Harriman	Republican Hold	Unknown	J. N. Mallon	2092	26.26%
43rd	Republican	W. F. Harriman	Republican Hold	Unknown	F. A. Coggswell	2	0.03%
46th	Republican	A. C. Hobart	Republican Hold	Republican	A. C. Hobart (incumbent)	5156	51.88%
46th	Republican	A. C. Hobart	Republican Hold	Unknown	William Mulvaney	4489	45.17%
46th	Republican	A. C. Hobart	Republican Hold	Unknown	H. A. Maltby	293	2.95%
46th	Republican	A. C. Hobart	Republican Hold	Unknown	H. Washburn	1	0.01%
47th	Republican	Abraham B. Funk	Republican Hold	Republican	E. W. Bachman	7917	65.18%
47th	Republican	Abraham B. Funk	Republican Hold	Unknown	Vernon W. Buck	4229	34.82%
49th	Republican	Henry Hospers	Republican Hold	Republican	George W. Lister	6287	55.80%
49th	Republican	Henry Hospers	Republican Hold	Unknown	Charles Bangert	4980	44.20%

== See also ==
- Elections in Iowa
