= Lacey Act of 1907 =

The Lacey Act of 1907, authored by Rep. John F. Lacey, an Iowa Republican, revised federal Indian Law to provide for the allotment of tribal funds to certain classes of Indians. These provisions were proposed after the passage of the Burke Act and the Dawes Act, both of which provided for the allotment of reservation lands to individual Indians, but not to communally owned trust funds. After much debate and several opposing arguments, President Theodore Roosevelt signed the bill into law on March 2, 1907.

The Lacey Act is made of two sections, Sec. 1 and Sec. 2. Section 1 states the general guidelines for those Indians wishing to claim his or her share of the tribal funds to which he is entitled. This first section stipulates that:

The Secretary of the Interior is hereby authorized, in his discretion, from time to time, to designate any individual Indian belonging to any tribe or tribes whom he may deem to be capable of managing his or her affairs, and he may cause the apportioned and allotted to any such Indian his or her pro rata of any tribal or trust funds on deposit in the Treasury of the United States to the Credit of such Indian on the books of the Treasury."

The above-mentioned stipulations will be met under the conditions that each individual Indian files an application for allotment of funds. Section 1 also states that:

The Secretaries of the Interior and the Treasury are hereby directed to withhold from such apportionment and allotment a sufficient sum of the said Indian funds as may be necessary or required to pay any existing claims against said Indians.

These claims must be pending for settlement at the time of such apportionment and allotment by judicial determination in the Court of Claims or the Executive Departments of the Government.

Section 2 of the Lacey Act allows the Secretary of the Interior to pay any Indian who is blind, crippled, decrepit, or helpless due to old age, disease, or accident their share of the tribal trust funds. Included in the conditions of Section 2, in the case that the previous requirements are met, is the organization for the allotment of funds placed into the Treasury, after the time of the initial allotment, which are intended for the credit of the individual's tribe. The Act explains:

... and of any other money which may hereafter be placed in the Treasury for the credit of such tribe and susceptible of division among its members, under such rules, regulations, and conditions as he may prescribe.
