= George Washington Ball (Iowa Democrat) =

American lawyer and politician

George W. Ball
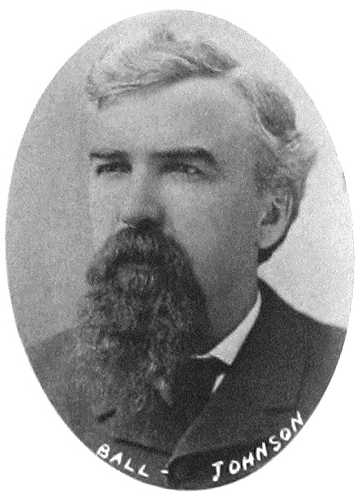

Member of the Iowa Senate from the 25th district
- In office 1900–1904

Member of the Iowa House of Representatives from the 35th district
- In office 1886–1887

Personal details
- Born: June 7, 1847 Jefferson County, Iowa, U.S.
- Died: July 18, 1915 (aged 68) Iowa City, Iowa, U.S.
- Party: Democratic
- Occupation: Politician; attorney

George Washington Ball (June 7, 1847 – July 18, 1915) was an American lawyer and politician from the state of Iowa. He served in the Iowa General Assembly as Representative of Johnson County and later as State Senator. He also served on the city council of Iowa City from 1881 to 1883, and was mayor of the city from 1905 to 1909.

Ball was born near Fairfield, Iowa, on June 7, 1847. His early life was spent upon his father's farm near the place of his birth where he remained until and he was educated in Fairfield public and private schools. He entered the Law Department of the State University of Iowa in 1868, graduated in 1869, and was admitted to the practice of law in the State of Iowa on December 15 of the same year. After his admission to the Bar he practiced for a short time in Des Moines and Mount Ayr, Iowa, and later on was admitted to the practice of law in Illinois and for a short time was engaged in the practice in the city of Chicago. In November, 1874, he moved to Iowa City, and became associated in the practice of law with Mr. Charles Baker under the firm name of Baker & Ball. This partnership continued until September 30, 1905, when Ball's son George W. Ball Jr., became associated with the firm and the firm name became Baker, Ball & Ball, and so continued until the death of Baker in 1910, and thereon the firm continued in the practice in Iowa City in the firm name of Ball & Ball until the death of Ball Sr. in 1915.

Ball was married January 1, 1880, to Estella E. Walter. From this marriage there were born four children, George W. Ball Jr., Walter M. Ball, Henry M. Ball and Edith Ball Macbride.

Ball was a member of the Methodist Church of Iowa City, and served his church for many years as a member of its official board. In politics Mr. Ball was a Democrat and served his party in numerous positions. He was a member of the city council of Iowa City from 1881 to 1883, and Representative from Johnson County to the Twenty-first General Assembly from 1886 to 1887. He represented the Iowa-Johnson district in the State Senate in the Twenty-eighth and Twenty-ninth General Assemblies. Later on he was elected Mayor of Iowa City for two terms, serving from 1905 to 1909. He was a member of the board of directors and vice-president of the First National Bank of Iowa City for many years, and a member of the Board of Curators of the State Historical Society. Ball was deeply interested in Masonic work. He was a member of Iowa City Lodge No. 4 A. F. & A. M., Iowa City Chapter No. 2, Palestine Commandery No. 2 K. T., De Molay Consistory No. 1 of Clinton, 32d Degree, El Kahir Temple, A. A. O. N. M. S. (Mystic Shrine) of Cedar Rapids, Iowa. He served as Worshipful Master of Iowa City Lodge No. 4, High Priest of Iowa City Chapter No. 2, Eminent Commander of Palestine Commandery, No. 2, and Grand Master of the Grand Lodge of Iowa for two terms, Grand High Priest of the Grand Chapter of Iowa, and Grand Prelate of the Grand Commandery of Iowa.

Ball died in Iowa City on July 18, 1915, aged 68.
