= 1899 Philadelphia mayoral election =

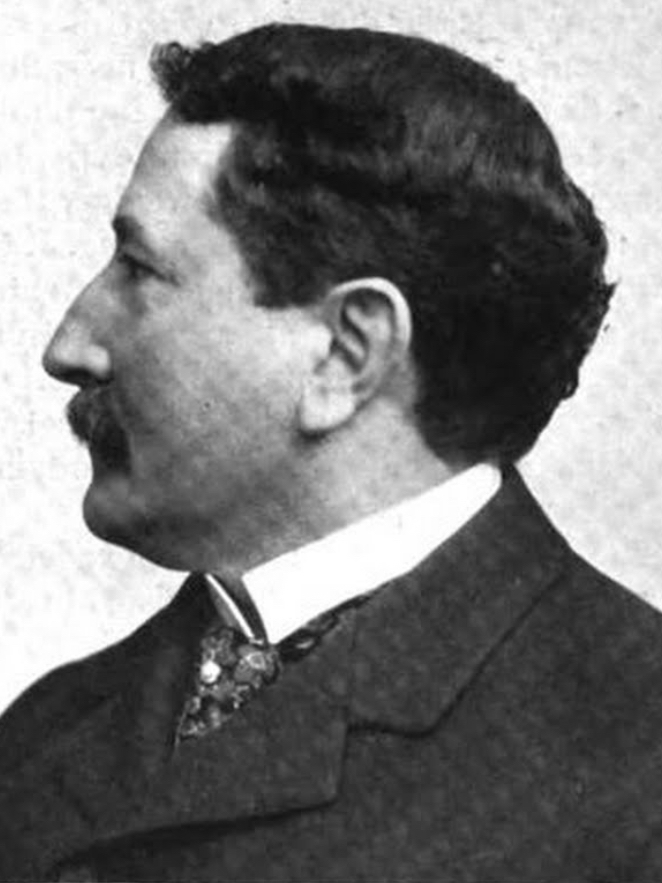

Nominee	Samuel Howell Ashbridge	W. Horace Hoskins
Party	Republican	Democratic
Popular vote	145,778	23,557
Percentage	84.29%	13.62%
Mayor before election
Charles F. Warwick
Republican
Elected mayor
Samuel Howell Ashbridge
Republican

The 1899 Philadelphia mayoral election saw Samuel Howell Ashbridge elected as mayor of Philadelphia.

== Results ==
1899 Philadelphia mayoral election
Party	Candidate	Votes	%
Republican	Samuel Howell Ashbridge	145,778	84.29%
Democratic	W. Horace Hoskins	23,557	13.62%
Populist	J. Emory Bryan	1,701	0.98%
Prohibition	Lewis L. Eavenson	1,233	0.71%
Single Tax	Herman V. Hetzel	671	0.39%
Turnout		172,940	
