= East High Street Historic District (Springfield, Ohio) =

Historic district in Ohio, United States

- East High Street District
- U.S. National Register of Historic Places
- U.S. Historic district
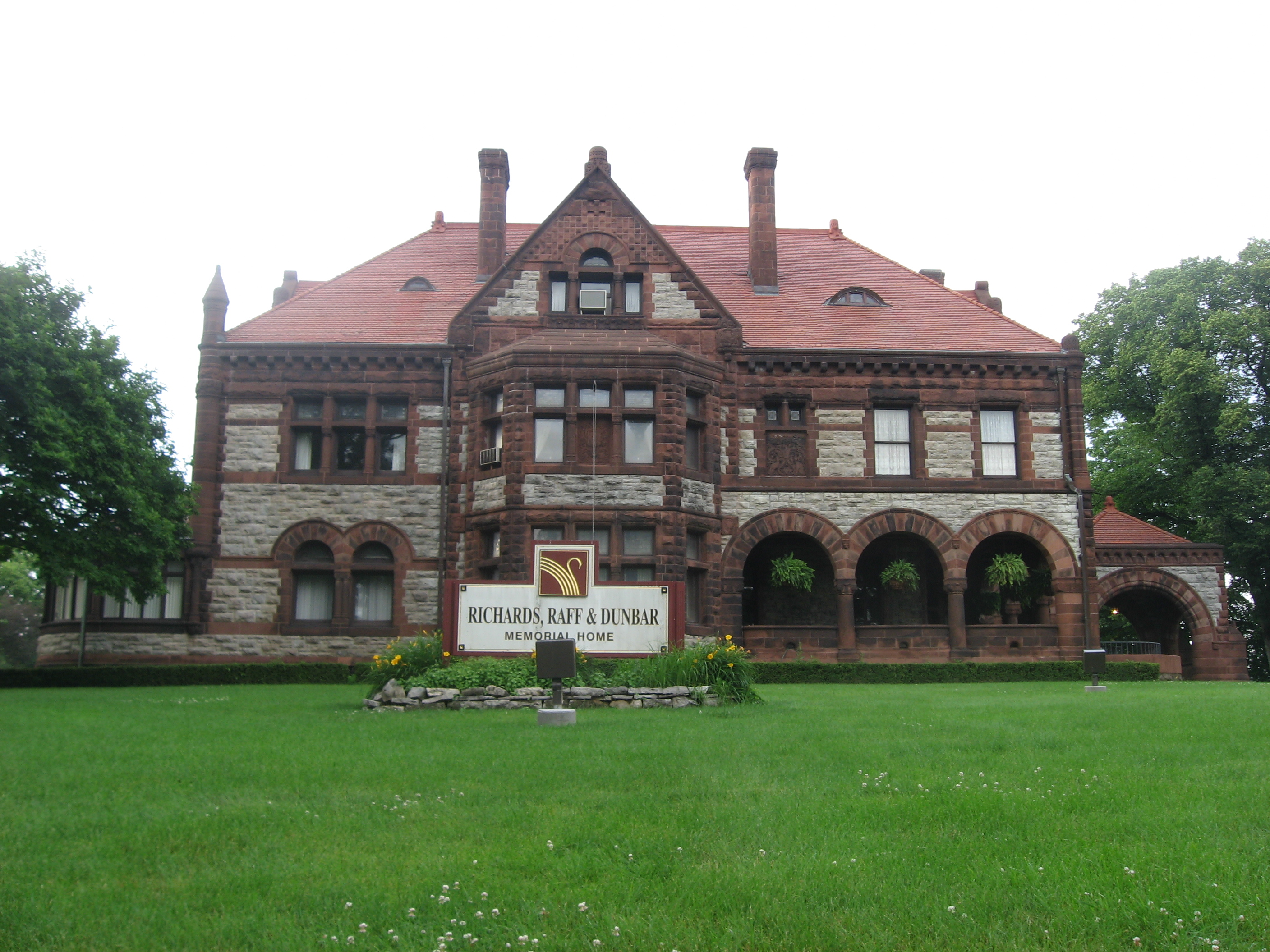
- Asa Bushnell House

- Location within Ohio Location within the United States
- Location: Roughly bounded by E. High, S. Sycamore, and Walnut Sts., Springfield, Ohio
- Coordinates: 39°55′18″N 83°47′48″W
- Area: 5 acres (2.0 ha)
- Built: 1856
- Architect: Robert H. Robertson
- Architectural style: Renaissance Revival, Italianate, Richardsonian Romanesque
- NRHP reference No.: 74001412
- Added to NRHP: October 9, 1974

The East High Street Historic District is a cluster of mansions on the eastern side of Springfield, Ohio, United States. Located along one of Springfield's most important thoroughfares and once home to some of its most prominent residents, the cluster was named a historic district in 1974.

== History ==
Springfield was founded in 1800, but for its first half-century of existence, the land now included within the district was used for agricultural purposes. However, by the 1840s, Springfield had grown eastward from its original core, and the brothers Gustavus and William Foos platted some of their land along High Street for residential purposes in 1848. After the Civil War, this portion of East High became a fashionable neighborhood for Springfield's wealthiest citizens, many of whom desired to live at a distance from their places of business. Despite attempts to cultivate West High Street as the city's millionaires' row in the 1880s, East High remained Springfield's most prestigious address into the 20th century.

== Residents ==
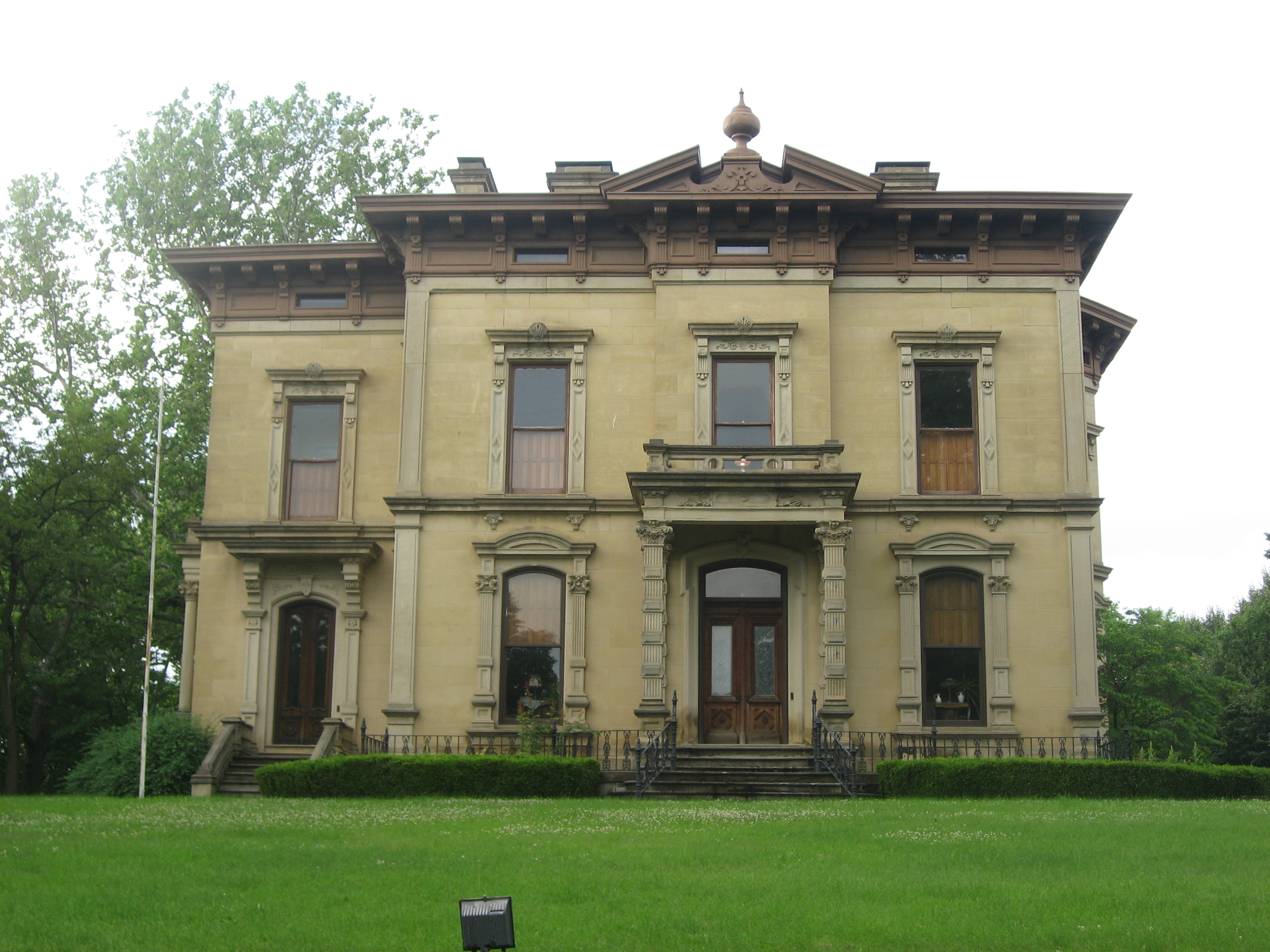
The Foos Manor, 810 High

Among the district's prominent residents have been the Buchwalter, Bauer, and Bushnell families of 805, 825, and 838 High respectively. Edward Lyon Buchwalter and his first wife Clementine Buchwalter were an industrialist and women's club leader, while Charles A. Bauer was a native of the Kingdom of Württemberg who became a mechanical engineer and built himself into one of Springfield's leading engineering consultants. Asa S. Bushnell and his wife lived at 838 E. High, which in 1908 was regarded as one of the most beautiful homes in Springfield. Built starting in 1888, this house was his residence while he served as Governor of Ohio in the 1890s. A heavily Richardsonian Romanesque structure, it includes exterior elements such as a stone facade, windows placed in clusters, and large archways, while the interior includes numerous fireplaces, elaborate woodworking, and multiple chandeliers. After passing into the ownership of a family named Proust in the 1920s, the house was bought by funeral home operator Austin Richards in 1939, whose company has used the property for over sixty years; it remains in operation as Richards, Raff, and Dunbar Memorial Home.

== Preservation ==
Still extant along portions of East High are examples of prominent late-19th-century architectural styles, including the Richardsonian Romanesque, the Renaissance Revival, and the Italianate styles. While other neighborhoods once possessed similar collections of styles near each other, East High is distinguished because its mix of styles has survived to the present day, unlike that of many other neighborhoods. In recognition of its architectural significance, a small portion of East High was designated the East High Street Historic District and listed on the National Register of Historic Places in 1974. It is composed of five contributing properties, located at 805, 810, 815, 825, and 838 East High.
