= L. M. Shaw =

American politician (1848–1932)

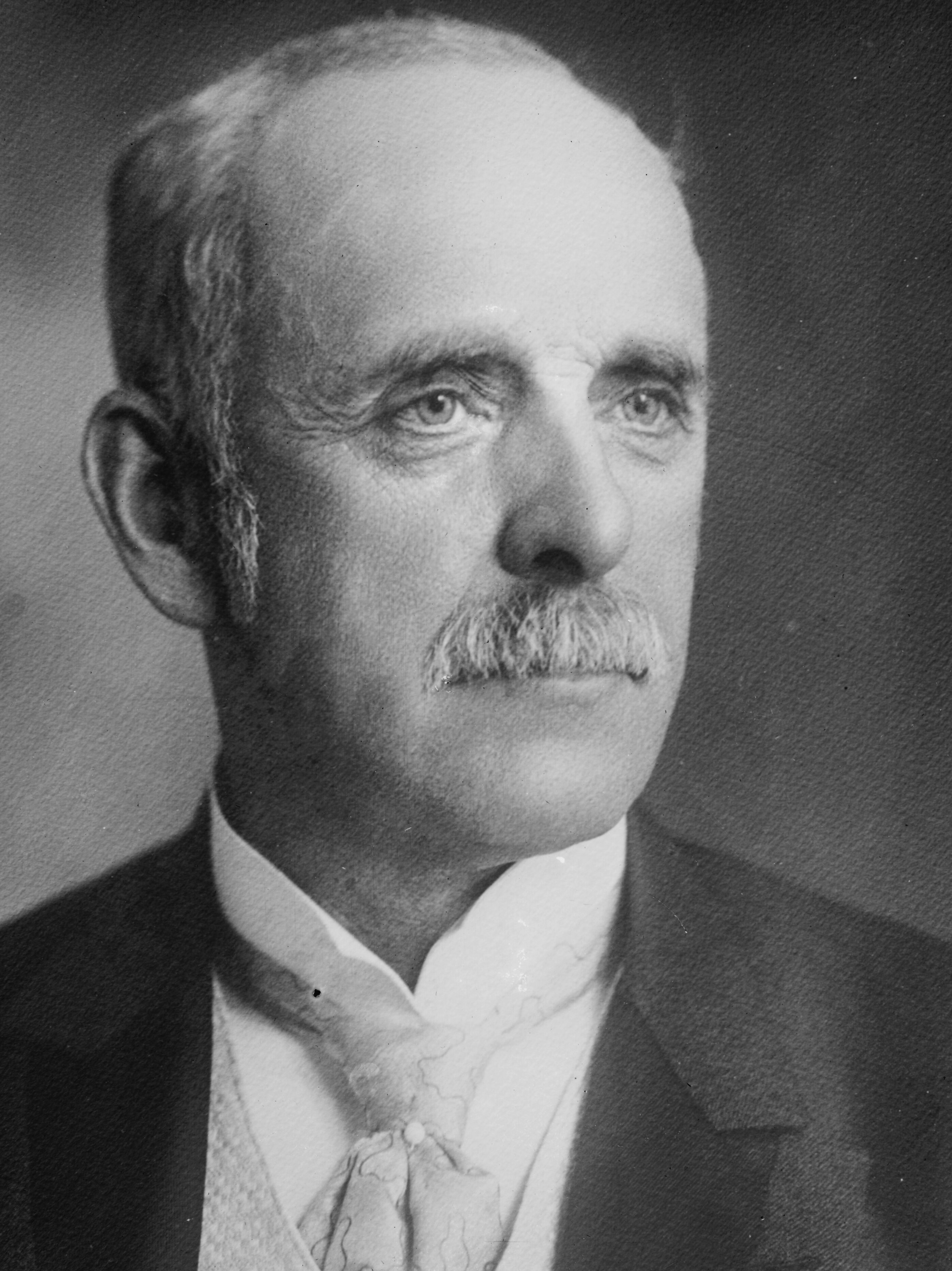

43rd United States Secretary of the Treasury
- In office February 1, 1902 – March 3, 1907
- President: Theodore Roosevelt
- Preceded by: Lyman J. Gage
- Succeeded by: George B. Cortelyou

17th Governor of Iowa
- In office January 13, 1898 – January 16, 1902
- Lieutenant: James C. Milliman
- Preceded by: Francis M. Drake
- Succeeded by: Albert B. Cummins

Personal details
- Born: Leslie Mortier Shaw; November 2, 1848 Morristown, Vermont, U.S.
- Died: March 28, 1932 (aged 83) Washington, D.C., U.S.
- Party: Republican
- Spouse: Alice Crenshaw
- Children: 3
- Education: Cornell College (BA); University of Iowa (LLB)

Leslie Mortier Shaw (November 2, 1848 – March 28, 1932) was an American businessman, lawyer, and politician. He served as the 17th governor of Iowa and was a Republican candidate in the 1908 United States presidential election. He was Secretary of the Treasury from 1902 to 1907.

== Early life ==
Shaw was born on November 2, 1848 in Morristown, Vermont, the son of Boardman O. Shaw and Louise Spaulding "Lovisa" Shaw. He attended Cornell College in 1874 and then University of Iowa Law in 1876. Shaw married the former Alice Crenshaw on December 6, 1877, with whom he had three children.

Shaw was a part-time lawyer and part-time apple salesman in Denison, Iowa. He later became a banker and founded, with partner Carl F. Kuehnle, the Bank of Dennison, in Dennison, Iowa. They would go on to found banks in Manilla, Iowa and Charter Oak, Iowa. He was a Methodist, and superintendent of his Sunday school for over 25 years. He also founded, in 1893, the Denison Business and Normal College, which stayed opened until 1917.

== Governorship ==
In 1898, he became the 17th governor of Iowa, serving until 1902. During his tenure, he established the Board of Control for Iowa's state institutions. He set the foundation to build the Memorial, Historical, and Art Department. He created the Library Commission and helped to establish free public libraries and school libraries throughout the state. He was also the first governor of Iowa to drive a car.

== Secretary of Treasury ==
He became active in politics during the 1896 presidential election where he held speeches in favor of William McKinley, arguing in favor of his monetary policy. He then became the U.S. Secretary of the Treasury, being nominated by President Theodore Roosevelt in 1902.

Like his predecessor Secretary Lyman Gage, Shaw firmly believed that the Treasury should serve the money market in times of difficulty through the introduction of Treasury funds. To this end, Shaw bought back the government bonds from commercial banks that owned them, increased the number of government depository banks, and in 1902, he told the banks that they no longer needed to keep cash reserves against their holdings of public funds. The intended effect of these actions was to provide a more elastic currency which would then respond to the needs of the market. The government intervention in the money market reached its height with Shaw. He supported tariff theory according to The New York Times. He resigned on March 3, 1907, to become a banker in New York City. Later that year, the Panic of 1907 took place.

He was a candidate for the Republican Party nomination during the U.S. presidential election in 1908. Shaw was a critic of Woodrow Wilson and the League of Nations. He campaigned for Calvin Coolidge and Herbert Hoover. He was a strong supporter of the Smoot-Hawley tariff.

== Later life ==
After leaving the Presidential Cabinet, he returned to banking, working in New York City and Philadelphia, eventually becoming president of banks in both cities.

Shaw died of pneumonia in Washington, D.C. in 1932, and was buried in a mausoleum at Oakland Cemetery in Denison, Iowa.

Party political offices
Preceded by Francis M. Drake	Republican nominee for Governor of Iowa; 1897, 1899	Succeeded by Albert B. Cummins
Political offices
Preceded by Francis M. Drake	Governor of Iowa; 1898–1902	Succeeded by Albert B. Cummins
Preceded by Lyman J. Gage	United States Secretary of the Treasury; 1902–1907	Succeeded by George B. Cortelyou
