= Elisha Dyer Jr. =

American politician

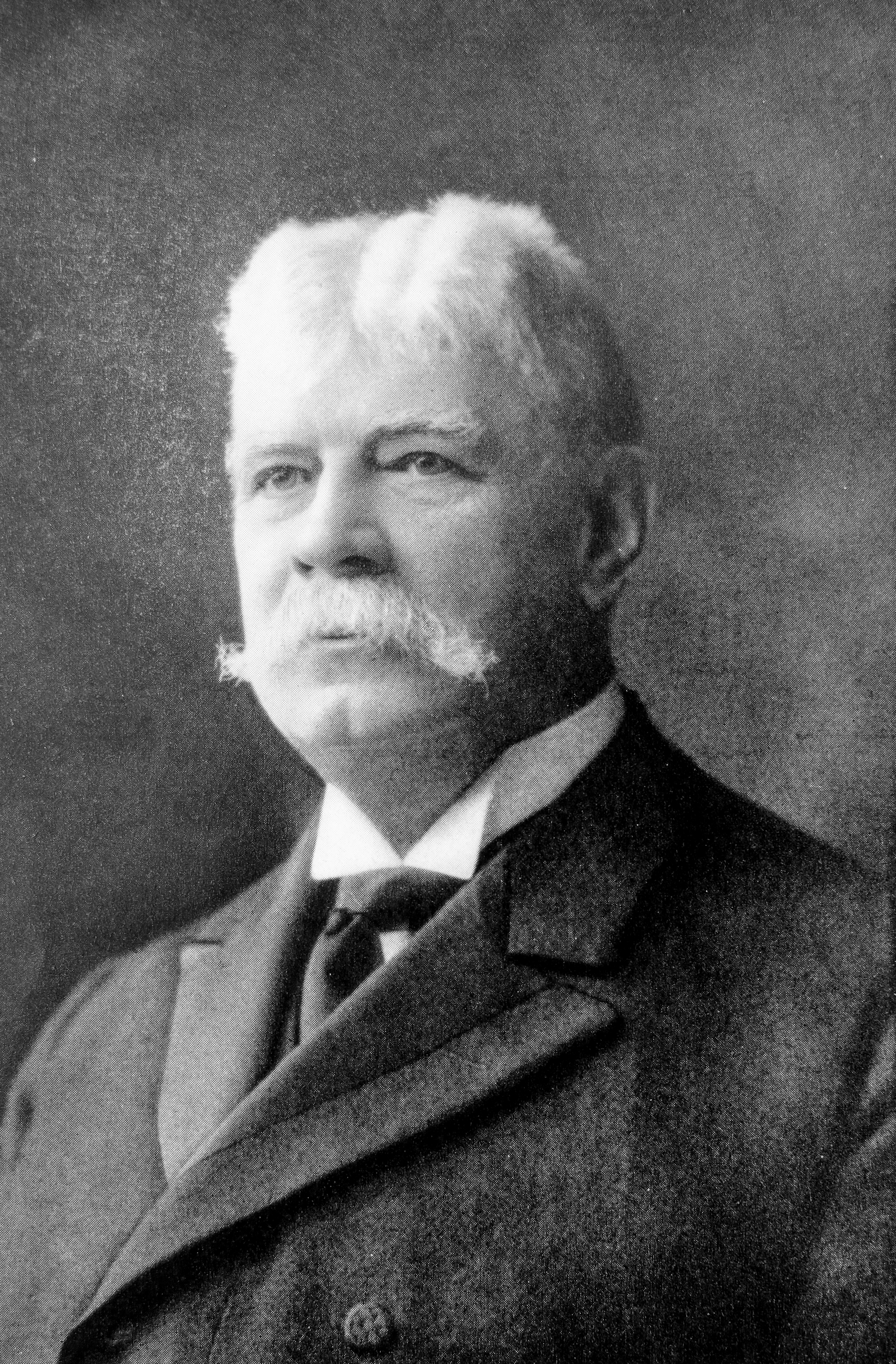

45th Governor of Rhode Island
- In office May 25, 1897 – May 29, 1900
- Lieutenant: Aram J. Pothier; William Gregory
- Preceded by: Charles W. Lippitt
- Succeeded by: William Gregory

23rd Mayor of Providence, Rhode Island
- In office January 1906 – November 29, 1906
- Preceded by: Augustus S. Miller
- Succeeded by: Patrick J. McCarthy

Member of the Rhode Island Senate
- In office 1877–1904

Member of the Rhode Island House of Representatives
- In office 1882

Personal details
- Born: November 29, 1839 Providence, Rhode Island, US
- Died: November 29, 1906 (aged 67) Providence, Rhode Island, US
- Resting place: Swan Point Cemetery
- Party: Republican
- Spouse: Nancy A. Viall
- Parent(s): Elisha Dyer, Anna Jones Hoppin
- Education: Brown University
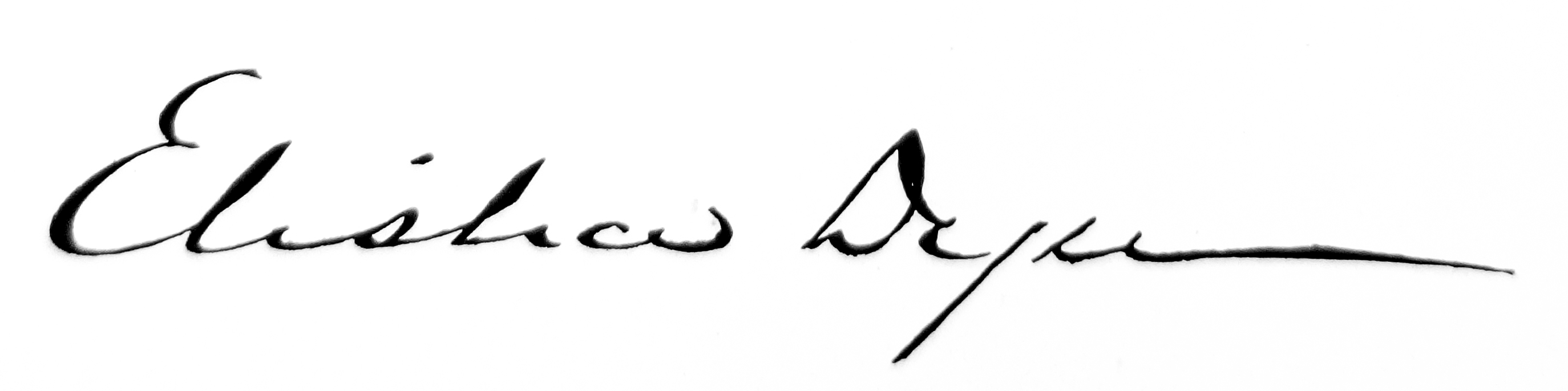
- Signature

Military service
- Allegiance: United States
- Branch/service: United States Army; Union Army
- Unit: Rhode Island Militia; 1st Rhode Island Light Artillery
- Commands: Providence Marine Corps of Artillery
- Battles/wars: American Civil War

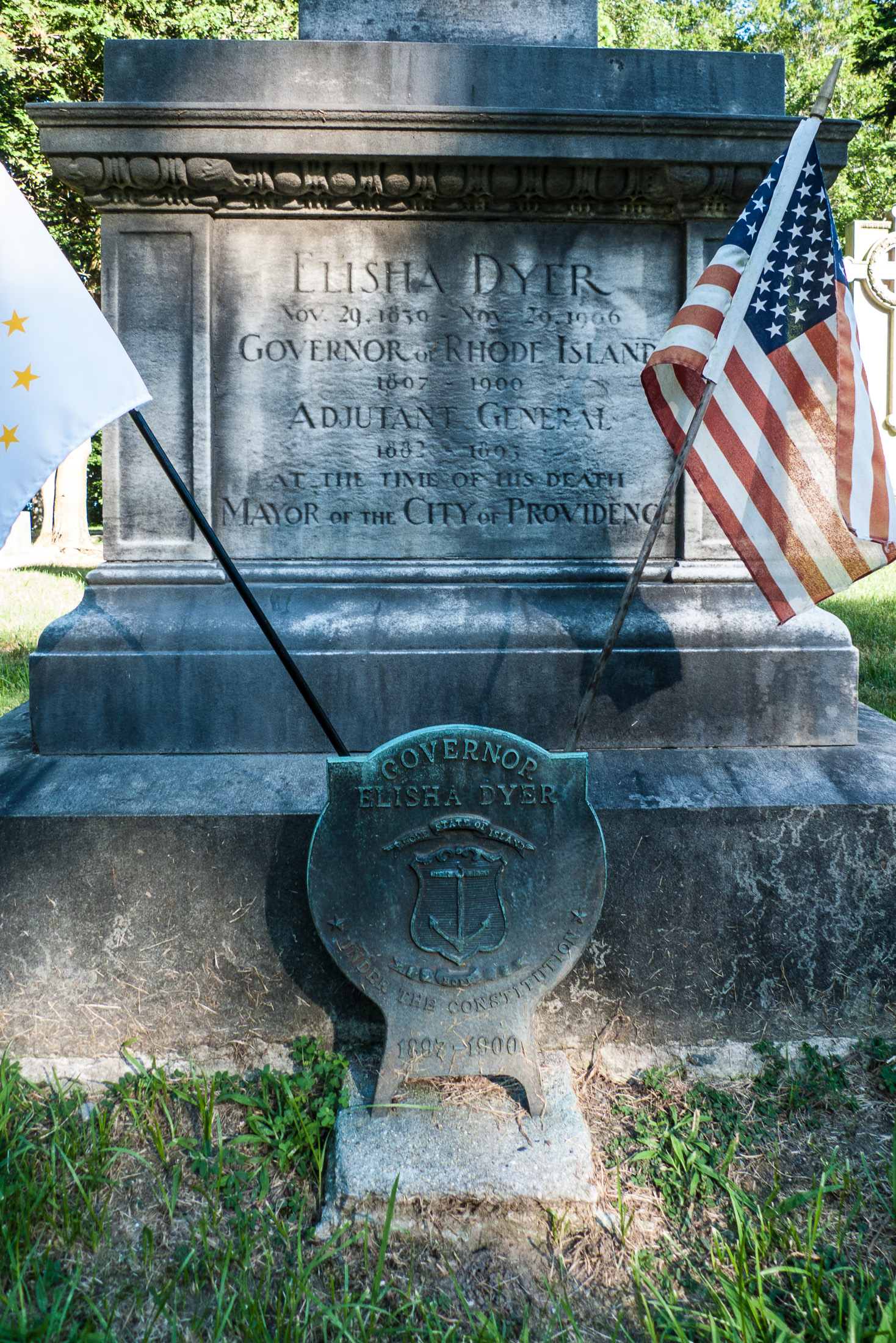
Elisha Dyer Jr's grave at Swan Point Cemetery in Providence

Elisha Dyer Jr. (November 29, 1839 – November 29, 1906) was a Rhode Island politician who was 45th governor of Rhode Island from 1897 to 1900. He was the son of Elisha Dyer, governor of Rhode Island from 1857 to 1859.

== Early life ==
Dyer was born in Providence, Rhode Island. He was the son of Rhode Island Governor Elisha Dyer (1811–1890) and Anna Jones (née Hoppin) Dyer (1815–1884). His siblings included George Rathbun Dyer (1834–1851), Anna Jones Dyer Hubbard (1844–1884), Gabriel Bernon Dyer (1847–1902), and William Jones Dyer (1850–1915).

He earned a bachelor's degree in chemistry from Brown University and a Ph.D. in chemistry from the University of Giessen. While attending Brown, he joined the Zeta Psi fraternity.

== Career ==
=== Military service ===
Dyer's military career began in October 1856 when he enlisted in the First Light Infantry, a prestigious unit of the Rhode Island Militia located in Providence. On April 8, 1858, at the age of eighteen, he was appointed by his father as a colonel and aide-de-camp on his father's military staff. He relinquished the position when his father left office in May 1859.

On the outbreak of the Civil War, Dyer enlisted as the 4th sergeant of the 1st Light Artillery Battery of Rhode Island on April 15, 1861. Sergeant Dyer was sent with the battery to Easton, Pennsylvania to train other volunteer artillery units. Dyer was discharged shortly after his arrival due to accidental injuries he suffered after an explosion of a limber chest, on April 21, 1861.

On September 28, 1861 he was commissioned lieutenant and commissary of the Providence Marine Corps of Artillery. He was promoted to captain on April 28, 1862 and to major on June 7, 1862. He also served as military aide-de-camp to Governor James Y. Smith, with the rank of colonel, from May 26, 1863 to May 29, 1866.

On June 7, 1869 he was elected lieutenant colonel commanding the Providence Marine Corps of Artillery, serving until April 24, 1871. He was re-elected as lieutenant colonel of the Providence Marine Corps of Artillery on April 29, 1872 and served until April 27, 1874. On May 10, 1875 he was commissioned as a lieutenant colonel and was placed in command of 1st Battalion of Light Artillery and served until May 13, 1878.

On February 7, 1882, Dyer was appointed as adjutant general of the Rhode Island Militia and was promoted to the rank of brigadier general. He held this position until October 31, 1895 when he retired at his own request. His 13 years in office was one of the longest tenures in that position.

=== Political career ===
Dyer was elected to the Rhode Island Senate in 1877 and to the Rhode Island House of Representatives in 1882. He then served as Adjutant General of Rhode Island, with the rank of brigadier general, from 1882 to 1895.

In 1896, he was elected Governor of Rhode Island as a Republican. He was re-elected twice and served from 1897 to 1900. After serving as governor, he was again elected to the state Senate in 1904, and then was elected Mayor of Providence in 1905 and took office the following January and served until his death on November 29, 1906, his 67th birthday.

== Memberships ==
Elisah Dyer, Jr. was elected a Companion of the Second Class of the Massachusetts Commandery of the Military Order of the Loyal Legion of the United States on November 6, 1895. (Second Class Companions were the eldest sons of Veteran Companions of the First Class who had served as officers in the Union Armed Forces during the American Civil War. Upon the death of their fathers, Companions of the Second Class succeeded their fathers as Companions of the First Class.) He succeeded his father as a Companion of the First Class upon his father's death on May 17, 1890.

Dyer was also admitted as an hereditary member of the Rhode Island Society of the Cincinnati in 1898 by right of his descent from Captain William Jones, a veteran of the Revolutionary War and later Governor of Rhode Island. He was a charter member of the Rhode Island Society of Colonial Wars in 1897. He joined the Rhode Island Society of the Sons of the American Revolution in 1899 and served as its president from 1903 to 1904.

== Personal life ==
Dyer was married to Nancy Anthony Viall (1843–1920). She was the daughter of William Viall and Mary Brayton Anthony. Together, they were the parents of:

- Elisha Dyer III (1862–1917), who married Sidney Turner Swan (1857–1933).
- George Rathbone Dyer (1867–1867), who died young.
- George Rathbone Dyer (1869–1934), who married Grace Gurnee Scott (1870–1926)
- Hezekiah Anthony Dyer (1872–1943), who married Charlotte Osgood Tilden (1874–1953)

He died in Providence, while serving in office as Mayor, on his 67th birthday in 1906. He is interred in Swan Point Cemetery in Providence.

Party political offices
Preceded by Charles W. Lippitt	Republican nominee for Governor of Rhode Island; 1897, 1898, 1899	Succeeded by William Gregory
Political offices
Preceded by Charles W. Lippitt	Governor of Rhode Island; 1897–1900	Succeeded by William Gregory
Preceded by Augustus S. Miller	Mayor of Providence; 1906–1906	Succeeded by Patrick J. McCarthy
