= 1897 Iowa gubernatorial election =

- November 2, 1897
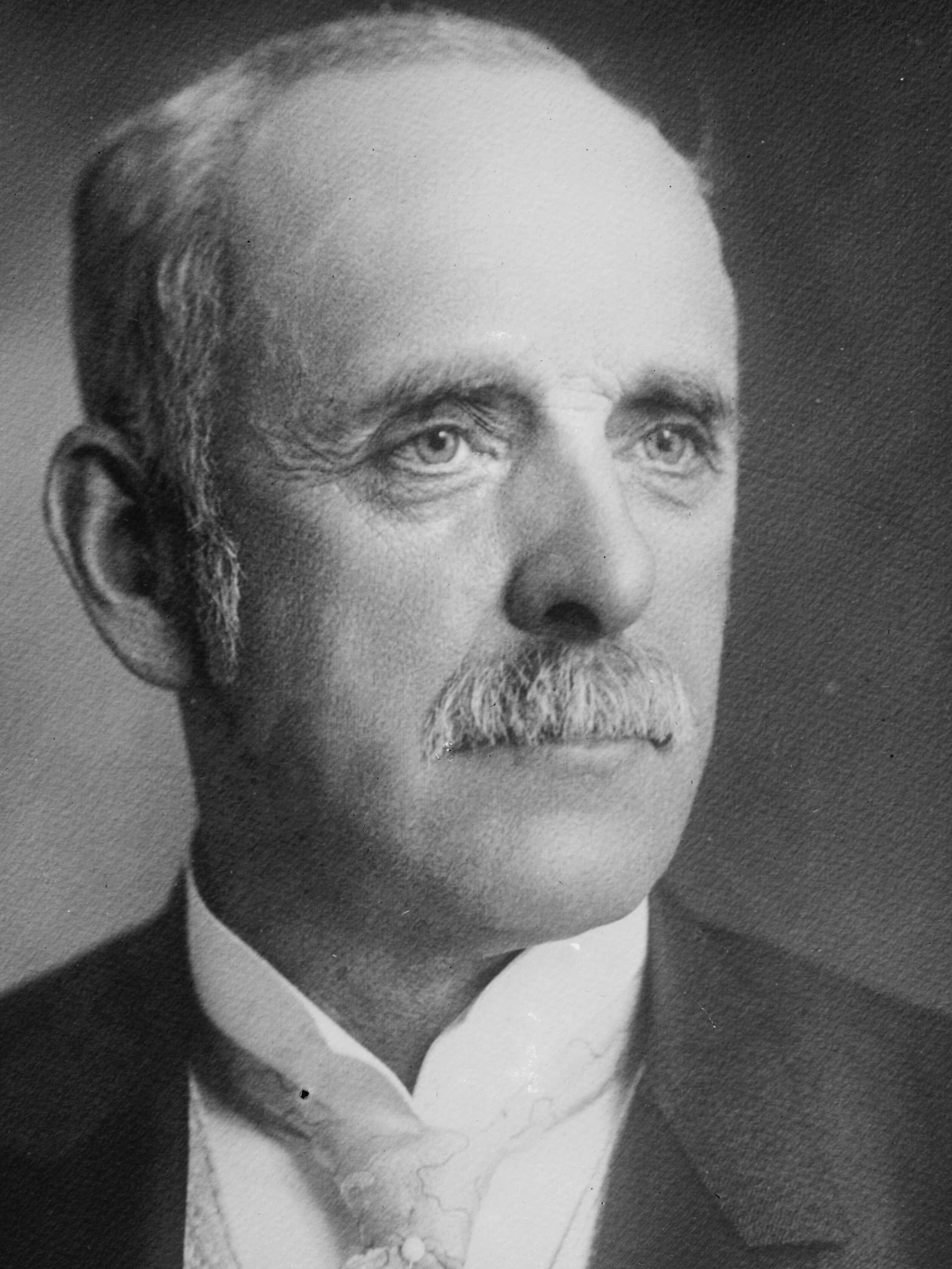

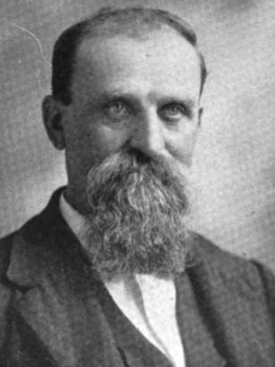
Nominee	L. M. Shaw	Frederick Edward White
Party	Republican	Democratic
Popular vote	224,729	194,853
Percentage	51.27%	44.46%
- County results Shaw: 40–50% 50–60% 60–70% 70–80% White: 40–50% 50–60%
Governor before election
Francis M. Drake
Republican
Elected Governor
L. M. Shaw
Republican

The 1897 Iowa gubernatorial election was held on November 2, 1897. Republican nominee L. M. Shaw defeated Democratic nominee Frederick Edward White with 51.27% of the vote.

== General election ==
=== Candidates ===
Major party candidates

- L. M. Shaw, Republican
- Frederick Edward White, Democratic

Other candidates

- S. P. Leland, Prohibition
- Charles Lloyd, People's
- John Cliggett, National Democratic
- M. J. Kremer, Socialist Labor

=== Results ===
1897 Iowa gubernatorial election
Party	Candidate	Votes	%	±%
Republican	L. M. Shaw	224,729	51.27%	
Democratic	Frederick Edward White	194,853	44.46%	
Prohibition	S. P. Leland	8,243	1.88%	
Populist	Charles Lloyd	5,295	1.21%	
Independent	John Cliggett	4,296	0.98%	
Socialist Labor	M. J. Kremer	876	0.20%	
Majority		29,876		
Turnout				
Republican hold		Swing		
