= Asa S. Bushnell =

40th Governor of Ohio

Asa Smith Bushnell
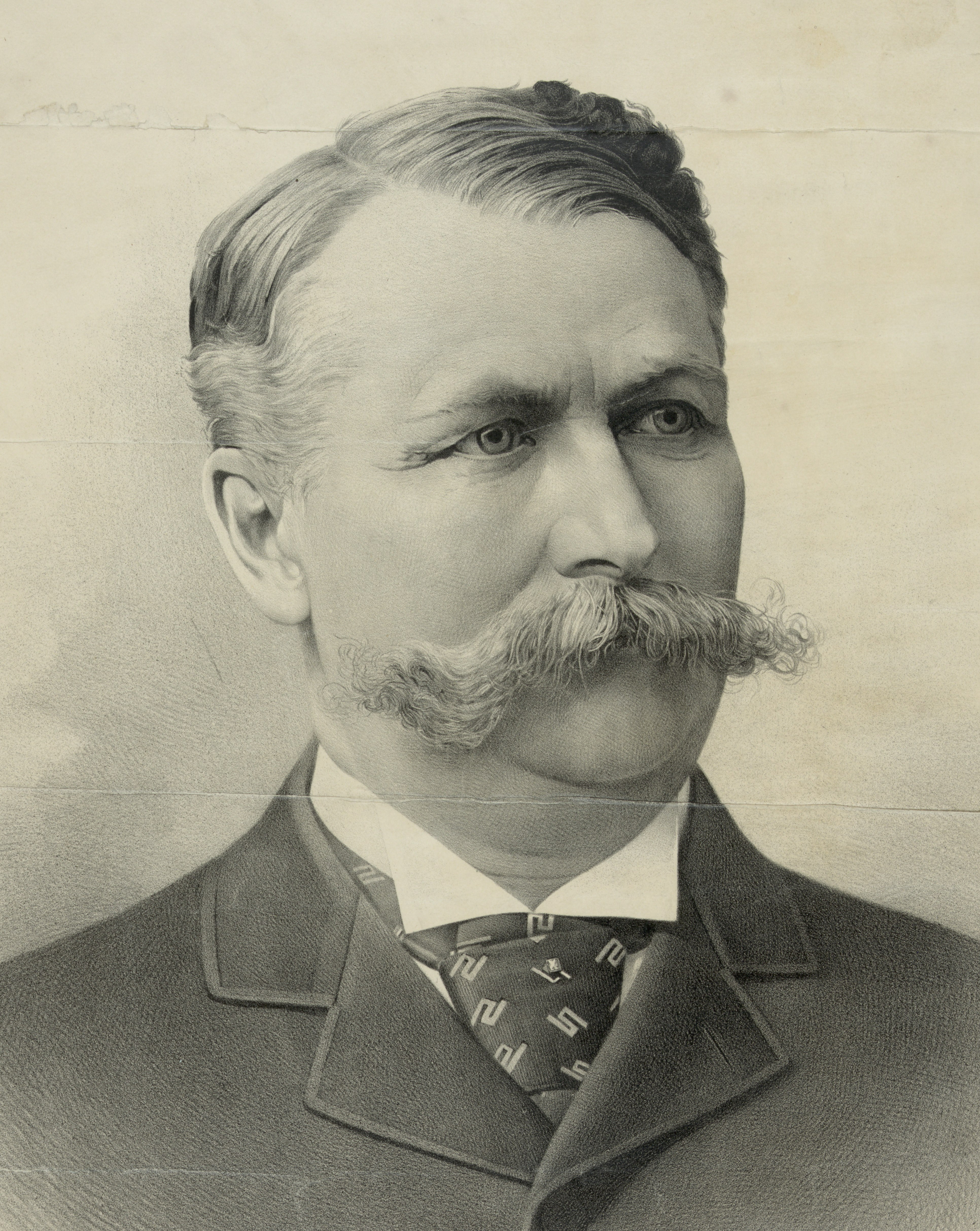

40th Governor of Ohio
- In office January 13, 1896 – January 8, 1900
- Lieutenant: Asa W. Jones
- Preceded by: William McKinley
- Succeeded by: George K. Nash

Personal details
- Born: September 16, 1834 Rome, New York, U.S.
- Died: January 15, 1904 (aged 69) Columbus, Ohio, U.S.
- Resting place: Ferncliff Cemetery, Springfield, Ohio
- Party: Republican
- Spouse: Ellen Ludlow
- Children: 3
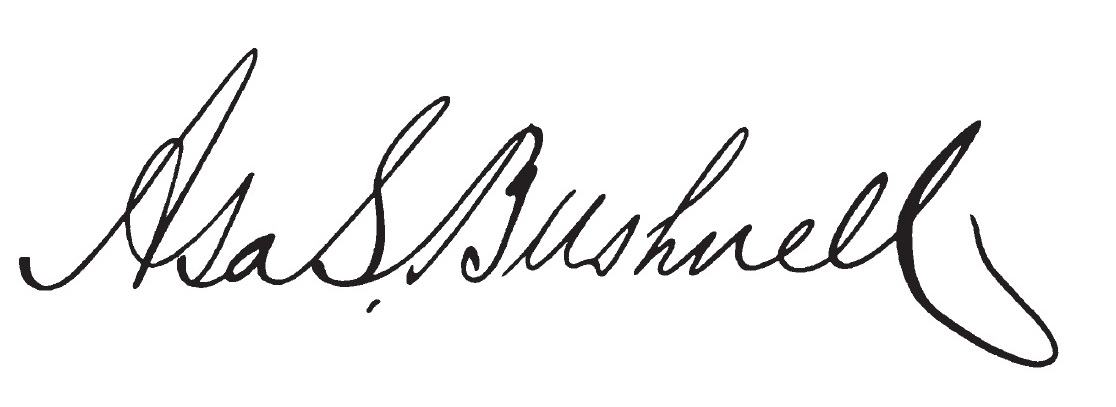
- Signature

Military service
- Allegiance: United States of America; Union
- Branch/service: Union Army
- Years of service: 1864
- Rank: Captain
- Unit: 152nd Ohio Infantry
- Battles/wars: American Civil War

Asa Smith Bushnell I (September 16, 1834 – January 15, 1904) was an American Republican politician from Ohio. He served as the 40th governor of Ohio. Before becoming governor, he served as the president of the Warder, Bushnell and Glessner Company, one of four companies that would merge to form International Harvester. Other roles in business included serving as president of the Springfield Gas Company and the First National Bank of Springfield.

== Biography ==
Bushnell was born in Rome, New York, and moved to Springfield, Ohio, at age 17. During the American Civil War, he raised a company of men for the 152nd Ohio Infantry, a 100-days regiment, and served as captain from May to September 1864. He was a Presidential elector in 1884 for Blaine/Logan. A business executive, Bushnell served as the Ohio state Republican Party Chair in 1885. He succeeded William McKinley as governor, serving two two-year terms from 1896 to 1900.

=== Valentine Anti-Trust Act ===
During the Bushnell administration, Ohio took an early leadership role in trust-busting. The Valentine Anti-Trust Act was signed into law by Bushnell. This Act prohibited price fixing, and production limitation. All of these practices helped businesses by driving up the prices for their products, thus harming the consumer. In addition to Valentine Anti-Trust Act, Bushnell's attorney general pursued the monopolistic practices of the Standard Oil Company in the courts. Eventually, U.S. Senator John Sherman of Ohio introduced the Sherman Antitrust Act in the United States Congress in 1890. This law served as the first serious attempt by the federal government to break up monopolies and trusts, though successful enforcement of anti-trust laws was still more than a decade, and new political commitment, away.

=== Death ===
Bushnell came from his home at Springfield in January 1904 to attend the inauguration of Governor Myron T. Herrick at Columbus. After the ceremony, he entered his carriage to return home, was struck with apoplexy before reaching the railroad station, and died at a Columbus hospital four days later. He was buried in the Ferncliff Cemetery, Springfield on January 18, 1904.

== Family ==
Bushnell married Ellen Ludlow of Springfield, September 17, 1857. They had two daughters and a son. He was a member of the Masons, the Grand Army of the Republic, and the Episcopal Church

== Residence ==
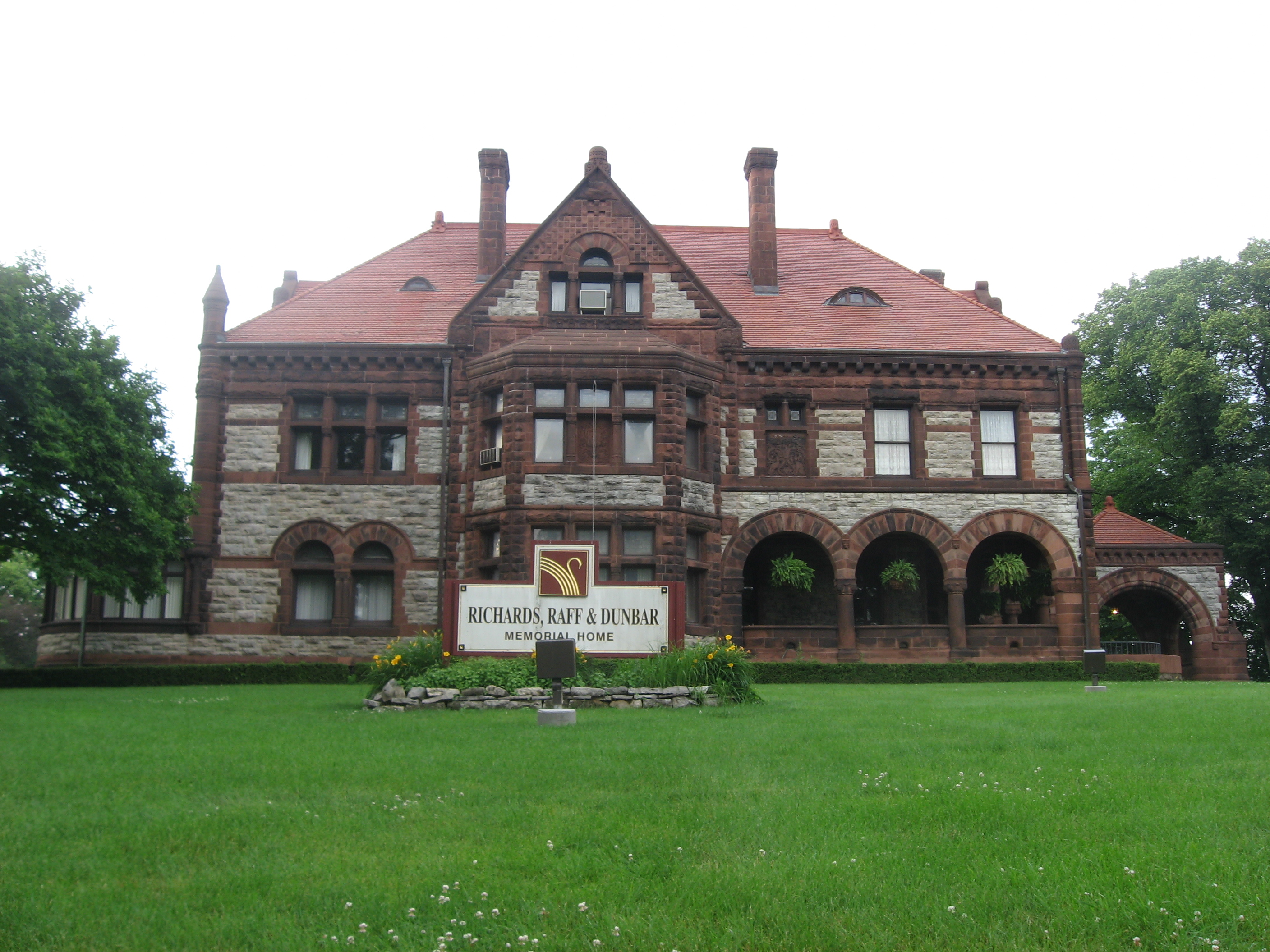
Gov. Asa S. Bushnell House, 838 E. High St., Springfield, Ohio (1885-88). Now a funeral home.

Bushnell and his wife built a Richardson Romanesque mansion in Springfield, Ohio. The house was not designed by Henry Hobson Richardson, but by Richardson’s firm soon after the architect's death. Both of Bushnell's business partners, Benjamin Head Warder and John Glessner, had earlier hired Richardson to design their houses: the Warder Mansion in Washington, DC, and the John J. Glessner House in Chicago. Glessner's house is considered one of Richardson's greatest designs.

The Bushnell House is part of Springfield's East High Street Historic District, which is on the National Register of Historic Places.

Political offices
Preceded by William McKinley	Governor of Ohio; 1896–1900	Succeeded by George K. Nash
Party political offices
Preceded by William McKinley	Republican Party nominee for Governor of Ohio; 1895, 1897	Succeeded by George K. Nash
