= 1897 Ohio gubernatorial election =

- November 2, 1897
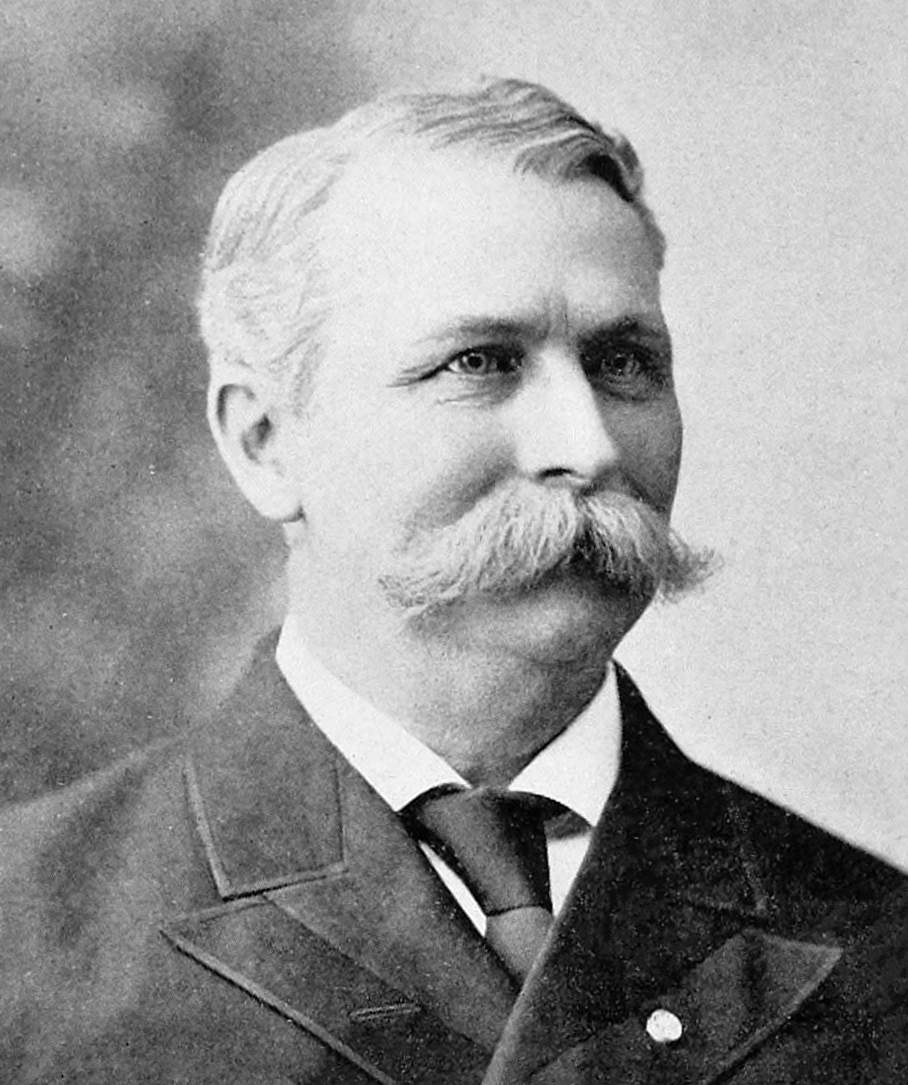

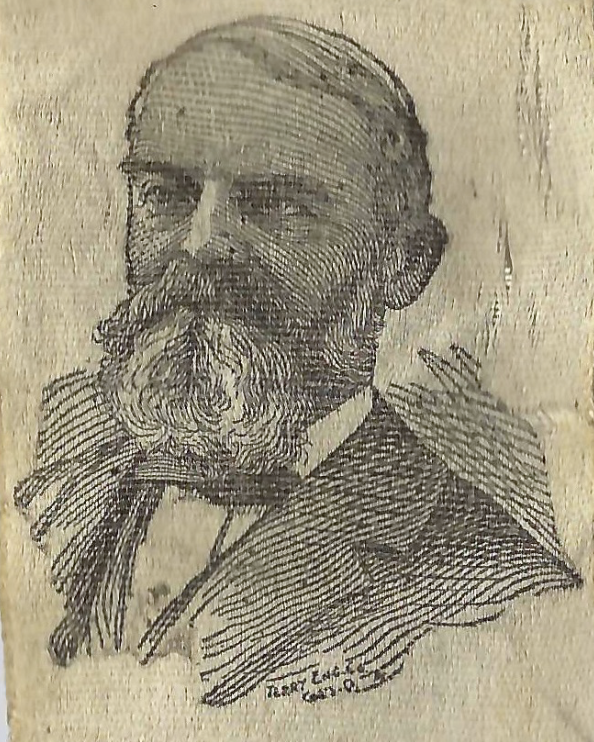
Nominee	Asa S. Bushnell	Horace L. Chapman
Party	Republican	Democratic
Popular vote	429,915	401,750
Percentage	50.28%	46.99%
- County results Bushnell: 40–50% 50–60% 60–70% 70–80% Chapman: 40–50% 50–60% 60–70% 70–80%
Governor before election
Asa S. Bushnell
Republican
Elected Governor
Asa S. Bushnell
Republican

The 1897 Ohio gubernatorial election was held on November 2, 1897. Incumbent Republican Asa S. Bushnell defeated Democratic nominee Horace L. Chapman with 50.28% of the vote.

== General election ==
=== Candidates ===
Major party candidates

- Asa S. Bushnell, Republican
- Horace L. Chapman, Democratic

Other candidates

- John C. Holiday, Prohibition
- Jacob S. Coxey Sr., People's
- William Watkins, Socialist Labor
- John Richardson, Liberty
- Julius Dexter, National Democratic
- Samuel J. Lewis, Independent

=== Results ===
1897 Ohio gubernatorial election
Party	Candidate	Votes	%	±%
Republican	Asa S. Bushnell (incumbent)	429,915	50.28%	
Democratic	Horace L. Chapman	401,750	46.99%	
Prohibition	John C. Holiday	7,555	0.88%	
Populist	Jacob S. Coxey Sr.	6,276	0.73%	
Socialist Labor	William Watkins	4,246	0.50%	
Independent	John Richardson	3,105	0.36%	
National Democratic	Julius Dexter	1,662	0.19%	
Independent	Samuel J. Lewis	477	0.06%	
Majority		28,165		
Turnout				
Republican hold		Swing		
