= 1899 Mississippi gubernatorial election =

- November 7, 1899
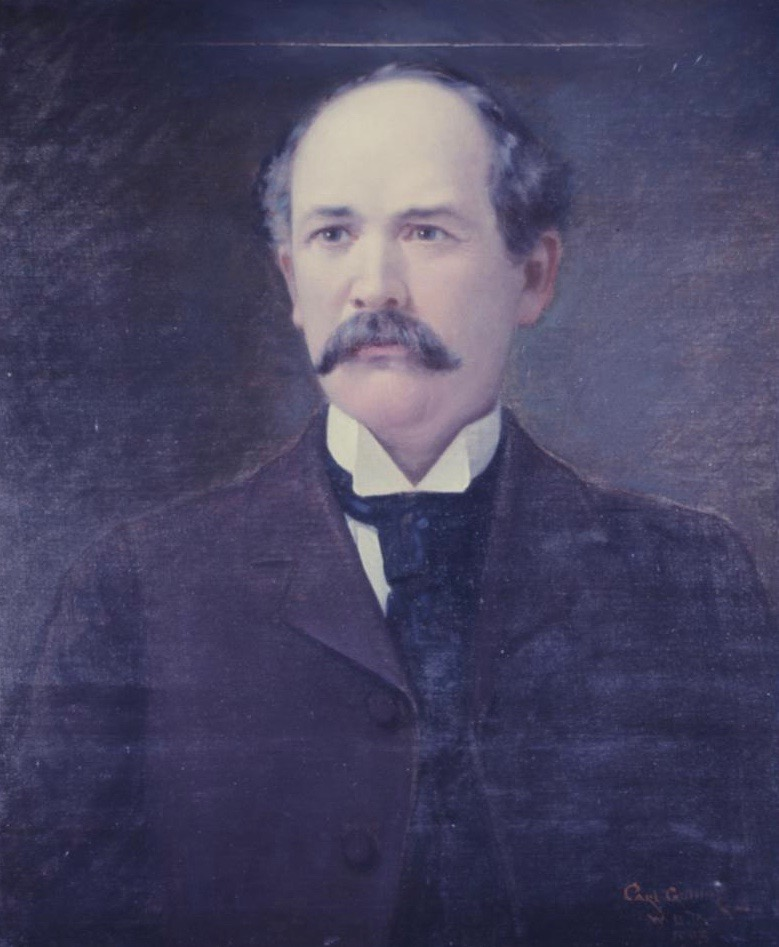

Nominee	Andrew H. Longino	R. K. Prewitt
Party	Democratic	Populist
Popular vote	42,273	6,097
Percentage	87.40%	12.61%
- County results Longino: 50–60% 60–70% 70–80% 80–90% >90%
Governor before election
Anselm J. McLaurin
Democratic
Elected Governor
Andrew H. Longino
Democratic

The 1899 Mississippi gubernatorial election took place on November 7, 1899, in order to elect the Governor of Mississippi. Incumbent Democrat Anselm J. McLaurin was term-limited, and could not run for reelection to a second term.

== Democratic primary ==
[data missing]

== General election ==
In the general election, Democratic candidate Andrew H. Longino, a former state senator, easily defeated Populist candidate R. K. Prewitt.

=== Results ===
Mississippi gubernatorial election, 1899
Party	Candidate	Votes	%
Democratic	Andrew H. Longino	42,273	87.40
Populist	R. K. Prewitt	6,097	12.61
Total votes		48,370	100.00
Democratic hold			
