= 1897 Rhode Island gubernatorial election =

- April 7, 1897
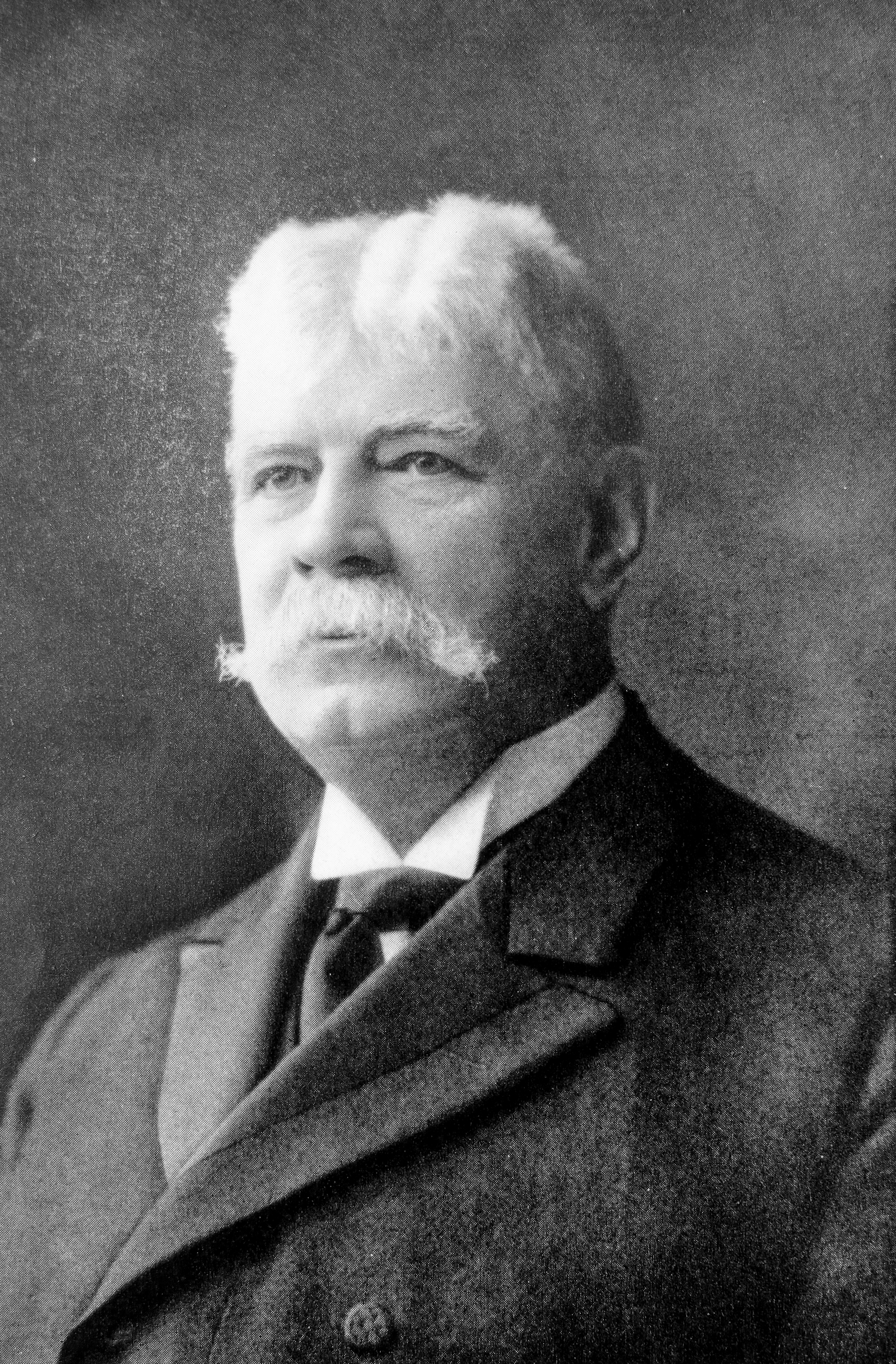

Nominee	Elisha Dyer Jr.	Daniel T. Church	Thomas H. Peabody
Party	Republican	Democratic	Prohibition
Popular vote	24,309	13,675	2,096
Percentage	58.11%	32.69%	5.01%
- Dyer: 50–60% 60–70% 70–80% 80-90% Church: 50–60%
Governor before election
Charles W. Lippitt
Republican
Elected Governor
Elisha Dyer Jr.
Republican

The 1897 Rhode Island gubernatorial election was held on April 7, 1897. Republican nominee Elisha Dyer Jr. defeated Democratic nominee Daniel T. Church with 58.11% of the vote.

== General election ==
=== Candidates ===
Major party candidates

- Elisha Dyer Jr., Republican
- Daniel T. Church, Democratic

Other candidates

- Thomas H. Peabody, Prohibition
- Franklin E. Burton, Socialist Labor
- John H. Larry, National Liberty

=== Results ===
1897 Rhode Island gubernatorial election
Party	Candidate	Votes	%	±%
Republican	Elisha Dyer Jr.	24,309	58.11%	
Democratic	Daniel T. Church	13,675	32.69%	
Prohibition	Thomas H. Peabody	2,096	5.01%	
Socialist Labor	Franklin E. Burton	1,386	3.31%	
Independent	John H. Larry	367	0.88%	
Majority		10,634		
Turnout				
Republican hold		Swing		
