= 1899 Rhode Island gubernatorial election =

- April 5, 1899
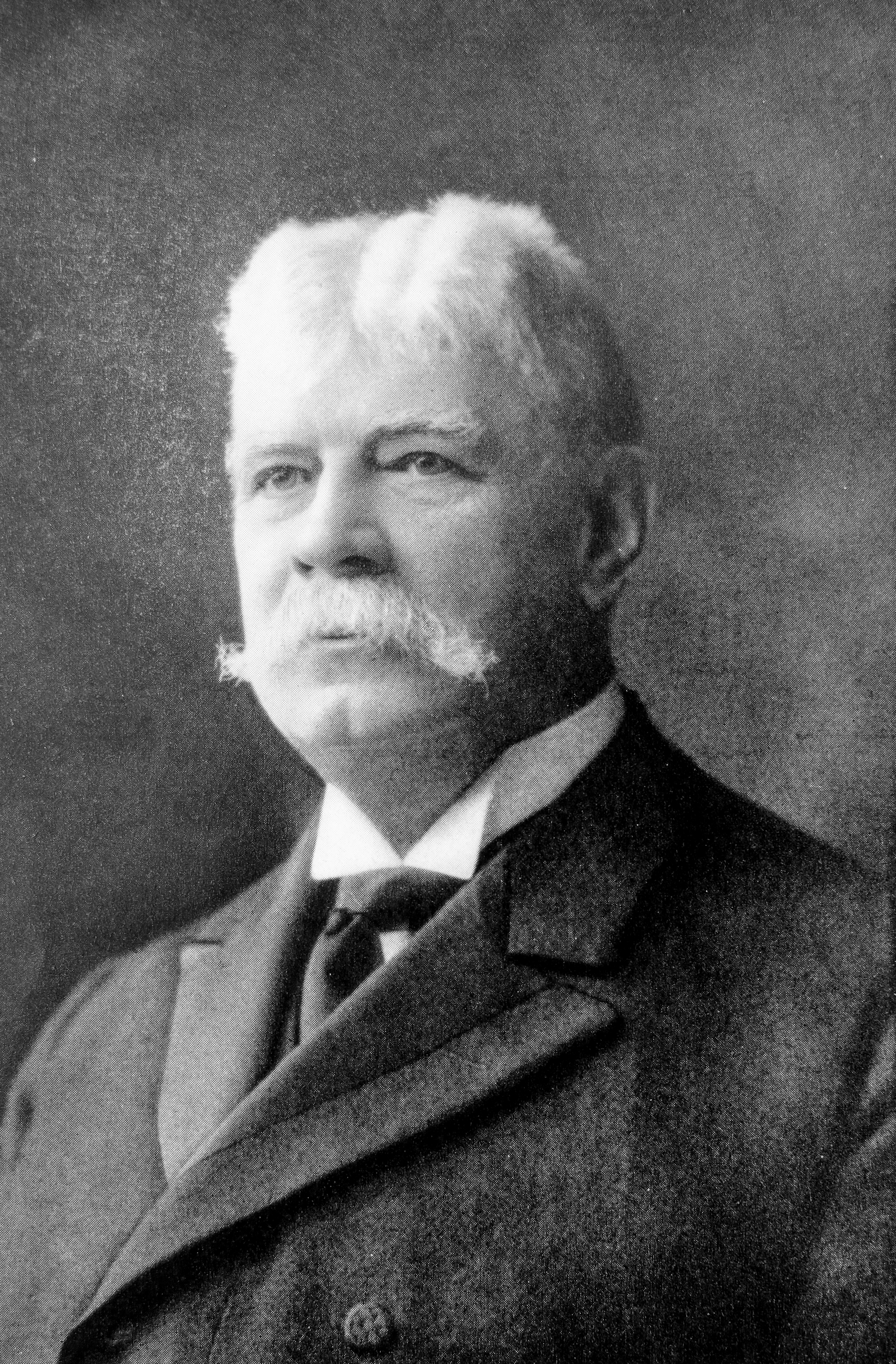

Nominee	Elisha Dyer Jr.	George W. Greene	Thomas F. Herrick
Party	Republican	Democratic	Socialist Labor
Popular vote	24,308	14,602	2,941
Percentage	56.36%	33.86%	6.82%
- Dyer: 40–50% 50–60% 60–70% 70–80% 80-90% Greene: 40–50%
Governor before election
Elisha Dyer Jr.
Republican
Elected Governor
Elisha Dyer Jr.
Republican

The 1899 Rhode Island gubernatorial election was held on April 5, 1899. Incumbent Republican Elisha Dyer Jr. defeated Democratic nominee George W. Greene with 56.36% of the vote.

== General election ==
=== Candidates ===
Major party candidates

- Elisha Dyer Jr., Republican
- George W. Greene, Democratic

Other candidates

- Thomas F. Herrick, Socialist Labor
- Joseph A. Peckham, Prohibition

=== Results ===
1899 Rhode Island gubernatorial election
Party	Candidate	Votes	%	±%
Republican	Elisha Dyer Jr. (incumbent)	24,308	56.36%	
Democratic	George W. Greene	14,602	33.86%	
Socialist Labor	Thomas F. Herrick	2,941	6.82%	
Prohibition	Joseph A. Peckham	1,279	2.97%	
Majority		9,706		
Turnout				
Republican hold		Swing		
