= 1899 Iowa gubernatorial election =

- November 7, 1899
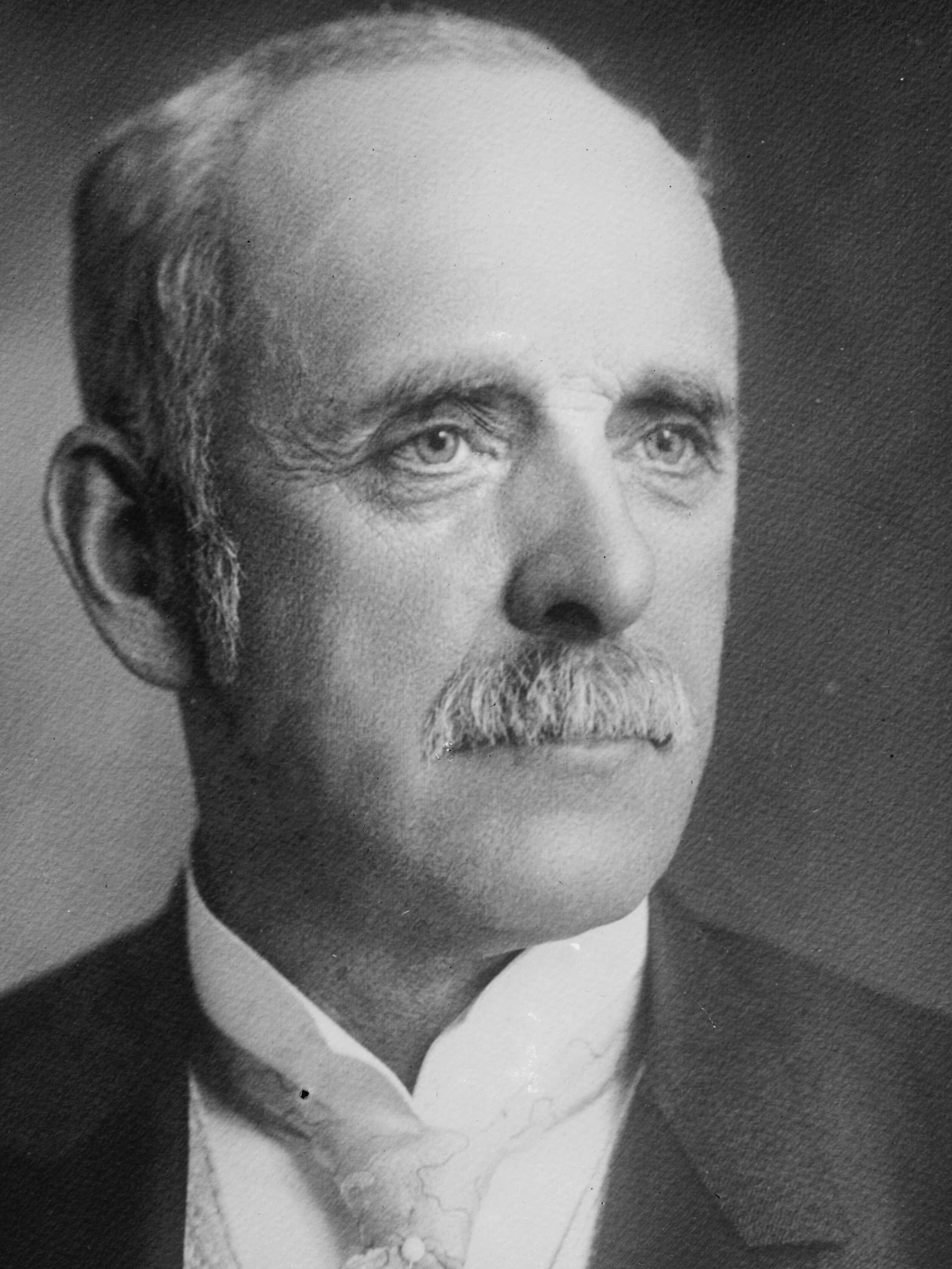

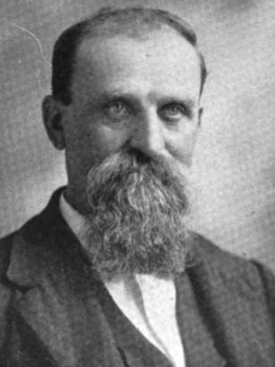
Nominee	L. M. Shaw	Frederick Edward White
Party	Republican	Democratic
Popular vote	239,464	183,301
Percentage	55.26%	42.30%
- County results Shaw: 40–50% 50–60% 60–70% 70–80% White: 40–50% 50–60%
Governor before election
L. M. Shaw
Republican
Elected Governor
L. M. Shaw
Republican

The 1899 Iowa gubernatorial election was held on November 7, 1899. Incumbent Republican L. M. Shaw defeated Democratic nominee Frederick Edward White with 55.26% of the vote.

== General election ==
=== Candidates ===
Major party candidates

- L. M. Shaw, Republican
- Frederick Edward White, Democratic

Other candidates

- Marshall W. Atwood, Prohibition
- Charles Lloyd, People's
- M. J. Kremer, Socialist Labor
- C. C. Heacock, United Christian

=== Results ===
1899 Iowa gubernatorial election
Party	Candidate	Votes	%	±%
Republican	L. M. Shaw (incumbent)	239,464	55.26%	
Democratic	Frederick Edward White	183,301	42.30%	
Prohibition	Marshall W. Atwood	7,639	1.76%	
Populist	Charles Lloyd	1,698	0.39%	
Socialist Labor	M. J. Kremer	757	0.18%	
Independent	C. C. Heacock	484	0.11%	
Majority		56,163		
Turnout				
Republican hold		Swing		
