= Frederick Edward White =

American politician (1844–1920)

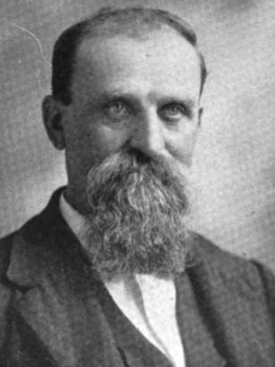

Member of the U.S. House of Representatives from Iowa's 6th district
- In office March 4, 1891 – March 3, 1893
- Preceded by: John F. Lacey
- Succeeded by: John F. Lacey

Personal details
- Born: January 19, 1844 Prussia
- Died: January 14, 1920 (aged 75) Sigourney, Iowa
- Party: Democratic
- Occupation: Farmer, politician

Military service
- Branch/service: Union Army
- Unit: 13th Iowa Infantry Regiment
- Battles/wars: Civil War

Frederick Edward White (January 19, 1844 – January 14, 1920) was a one-term Democratic U.S. representative from Iowa's 6th congressional district.

== Biography ==
Born in Prussia, White immigrated to the United States in 1857 with his mother, who settled on a farm in Keokuk County, Iowa. When the American Civil War began in 1861, he joined the 8th Iowa Volunteer Infantry Regiment, but as a seventeen-year-old, he was rejected on account of age. In February 1862, after his eighteenth birthday, he enlisted in the 13th Iowa Volunteer Infantry Regiment. He was mustered out in August 1865, after the war's end, and returned to Keokuk County and engaged in agricultural pursuits and stock raising.

In 1890, White received the Democratic nomination to run against incumbent Republican Congressman John F. Lacey for the U.S. House seat in Iowa's 6th congressional district. A protectionist measure known as the McKinley tariff had been approved by a Republican-controlled Congress and signed by a Republican president, but was extremely unpopular, especially in rural areas such as the 6th district, where it was blamed for making the agricultural economy worse. White took advantage of that backlash, and unseated Lacey, serving in the Fifty-second Congress. However, in the next election, many Iowa voters returned to historic voting patterns, and White (and the other new Iowa Democratic congressmen) were not re-elected. Instead, Lacey reclaimed his seat, and would hold it until 1907. In all, White served in Congress from March 4, 1891, to March 3, 1893.

After his defeat, White retired from public life and resumed agricultural pursuits.

He died in Sigourney, Iowa, on January 14, 1920. He was interred in Sigourney Cemetery.

Party political offices
Preceded by Washington I. Babb	Democratic nominee for Governor of Iowa; 1897, 1899	Succeeded by T. J. Phillips
Preceded by Claude R. Porter	Democratic nominee for Governor of Iowa; 1908	Succeeded by Claude R. Porter
U.S. House of Representatives
Preceded by John F. Lacey	Member of the U.S. House of Representatives from Iowa's 6th congressional district 1891–1893	Succeeded by John F. Lacey
