= List of governors of Wyoming =

Governor of Wyoming
- Seal of the governor

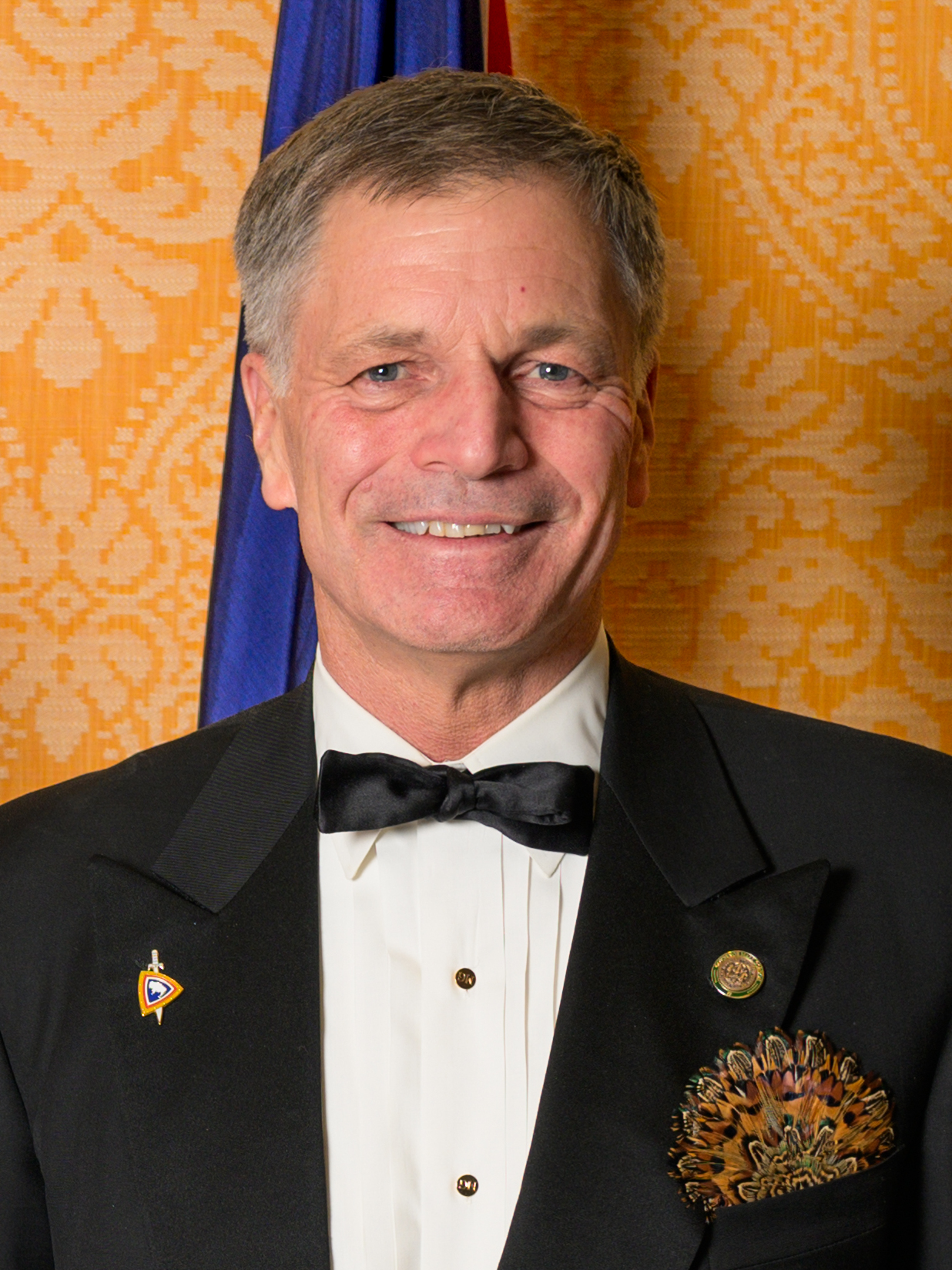
- Incumbent; Mark Gordon since January 7, 2019
- Style: Governor (informal); The Honorable (formal)
- Status: Head of state; Head of government
- Residence: Wyoming Governor's Mansion
- Term length: Four years, renewable once (limited to eight years in a sixteen year period)
- Inaugural holder: Francis E. Warren
- Formation: Wyoming Constitution
- Succession: Line of succession
- Salary: $105,000 (2022)
- Website: governor.wyo.gov

The governor of Wyoming is the head of government of Wyoming, and the commander-in-chief of the Wyoming's military department (National Guard).

The gubernatorial term has been set at four years since statehood. Originally, a governor could be elected any number of times. Since a 1992 referendum, governors have been limited to eight years in office during any 16-year period—effectively limiting them to two consecutive terms, or two non-consecutive terms in a 16-year period.

== List of governors ==
=== Territory of Wyoming ===
Governors of the Territory of Wyoming
No.	Governor	Term in office (Note: The range given is from the date the governor was confirmed by the Senate, or appointed by the President during a Senate recess, to the date the governor's successor was confirmed, unless noted.)	Appointed by
1	John Allen Campbell (1835–1880)	April 7, 1869 (Note: Campbell was nominated on April 3, 1869; confirmed by the Senate on April 7; took the oath of office on April 15; and arrived in the territory on May 7. He was reconfirmed by the Senate on March 26, 1873.) – February 10, 1875 (2136 days; replaced)	Ulysses S. Grant
2	John Milton Thayer (1820–1906)	February 10, 1875 (Note: Thayer was nominated and confirmed by the Senate on February 10, 1875, and took the oath of office on March 1.) – April 10, 1878 (1156 days; replaced)	Ulysses S. Grant
3	John Wesley Hoyt (1831–1912)	April 10, 1878 (Note: Hoyt was nominated on March 12, 1878; confirmed by the Senate on April 10; and arrived in the territory on May 29.) – August 3, 1882 (1577 days; replaced)	Rutherford B. Hayes
4	William Hale (1837–1885)	August 3, 1882 (Note: Hale was nominated on July 26, 1882; confirmed by the Senate on August 3; and took the oath of office on August 22.) – January 13, 1885 (895 days; died in office) (Note: Territorial Secretary Elliot S. N. Morgan acted as governor until Hale's successor arrived.)	Chester A. Arthur
5	Francis E. Warren (1844–1929)	February 27, 1885 (Note: Warren was nominated on February 26, 1885; confirmed by the Senate on February 27; and took the oath of office on February 28.) – November 11, 1886 (623 days; replaced)	Chester A. Arthur
6	George W. Baxter (1855–1929)	November 11, 1886 (Note: Baxter was appointed on November 11, 1886, during a Senate recess. He was not confirmed by the Senate before he resigned.) – December 20, 1886 (40 days; resigned) (Note: Baxter resigned due to charges of grazing cattle on government land; Territorial Secretary Elliot S. N. Morgan acted as governor until his successor arrived.)	Grover Cleveland
7	Thomas Moonlight (1833–1899)	December 20, 1886 (Note: Moonlight was nominated on December 8, 1886; confirmed by the Senate on December 20; and took the oath of office on January 24, 1887.) – April 9, 1889 (842 days; replaced)	Grover Cleveland
8	Francis E. Warren (1844–1929)	April 9, 1889 (Note: Warren was nominated on March 26, 1889; confirmed by the Senate on March 27; and took the oath of office on April 9.) – October 11, 1890 (551 days; elected state governor)	Benjamin Harrison

=== State of Wyoming ===
Governors of the State of Wyoming
No.	Governor	Term in office	Party	Election	Secretary of State (Note: Secretaries of state represented the same party as their governor unless noted.)
1	Francis E. Warren (1844–1929)	October 11, 1890 – November 24, 1890 (45 days; resigned) (Note: Warren resigned, having been elected to the United States Senate.)	Republican	1890	John W. Meldrum
1	Francis E. Warren (1844–1929)	October 11, 1890 – November 24, 1890 (45 days; resigned)	Republican	1890	Amos W. Barber
2	Amos W. Barber (1860–1915)	November 24, 1890 – January 2, 1893 (771 days; retired) (Note: Barber was instead reelected as secretary of state.)	Republican	Secretary of state acting	Acting as governor
3	John Eugene Osborne (1858–1943)	January 2, 1893 – January 7, 1895 (736 days; retired)	Democratic (Note: Osborne represented the Democratic and Populist parties.)	1892 (special)	Amos W. Barber (Note: Represented the Republican Party)
4	William A. Richards (1849–1912)	January 7, 1895 – January 2, 1899 (1457 days; retired)	Republican	1894	Charles W. Burdick
5	DeForest Richards (1846–1903)	January 2, 1899 – April 28, 1903 (1577 days; died in office)	Republican	1898	Fenimore Chatterton
5	DeForest Richards (1846–1903)	January 2, 1899 – April 28, 1903 (1577 days; died in office)	Republican	1902	Fenimore Chatterton
6	Fenimore Chatterton (1860–1958)	April 28, 1903 – January 2, 1905 (616 days; lost nomination)	Republican	Secretary of state acting	Acting as governor
7	Bryant Butler Brooks (1861–1944)	January 2, 1905 – January 2, 1911 (2192 days; retired)	Republican	1904 (special)	Fenimore Chatterton
7	Bryant Butler Brooks (1861–1944)	January 2, 1905 – January 2, 1911 (2192 days; retired)	Republican	1906	William Schnitger
8	Joseph M. Carey (1845–1924)	January 2, 1911 – January 4, 1915 (1464 days; retired)	Democratic (Note: Sobel & Raimo note Carey received the Democratic nomination, but called himself an Independent and, later, a Progressive.)	1910	Frank L. Houx
9	John B. Kendrick (1857–1933)	January 4, 1915 – February 24, 1917 (783 days; resigned) (Note: Kendrick resigned, having been elected to the United States Senate.)	Democratic	1914	Frank L. Houx
10	Frank L. Houx (1854–1941)	February 24, 1917 – January 6, 1919 (682 days; lost election)	Democratic	Secretary of state acting	Acting as governor
11	Robert D. Carey (1878–1937)	January 6, 1919 – January 1, 1923 (1457 days; lost nomination) (Note: Carey lost the Republican nomination to John W. Hay.)	Republican	1918	William E. Chaplin
12	William B. Ross (1873–1924)	January 1, 1923 – October 2, 1924 (641 days; died in office)	Democratic	1922	Frank Lucas
13	Frank Lucas (1876–1948)	October 2, 1924 – January 5, 1925 (96 days; retired) (Note: Lucas instead returned to position as secretary of state.)	Republican	Secretary of state acting	Acting as governor
14	Nellie Tayloe Ross (1876–1977)	January 5, 1925 – January 3, 1927 (729 days; lost election)	Democratic	1924 (special)	Frank Lucas
15	Frank Emerson (1882–1931)	January 3, 1927 – February 18, 1931 (1508 days; died in office)	Republican	1926	Alonzo M. Clark
15	Frank Emerson (1882–1931)	January 3, 1927 – February 18, 1931 (1508 days; died in office)	Republican	1930	Alonzo M. Clark
16	Alonzo M. Clark (1868–1952)	February 18, 1931 – January 2, 1933 (685 days; lost nomination) (Note: Clark lost the Republican nomination to Harry R. Weston.)	Republican	Secretary of state acting	Acting as governor
17	Leslie A. Miller (1886–1970)	January 2, 1933 – January 2, 1939 (2192 days; lost election)	Democratic	1932 (special)	Alonzo M. Clark
17	Leslie A. Miller (1886–1970)	January 2, 1933 – January 2, 1939 (2192 days; lost election)	Democratic	1934	Lester C. Hunt (Note: Represented the Democratic Party)
18	Nels H. Smith (1884–1976)	January 2, 1939 – January 4, 1943 (1464 days; lost election)	Republican	1938	Lester C. Hunt
19	Lester C. Hunt (1892–1954)	January 4, 1943 – January 3, 1949 (2192 days; resigned) (Note: Hunt resigned, having been elected to the United States Senate.)	Democratic	1942	Mart T. Christensen
19	Lester C. Hunt (1892–1954)	January 4, 1943 – January 3, 1949 (2192 days; resigned)	Democratic	1942	William M. Jack
19	Lester C. Hunt (1892–1954)	January 4, 1943 – January 3, 1949 (2192 days; resigned)	Democratic	1946	Arthur G. Crane
20	Arthur G. Crane (1877–1955)	January 3, 1949 – January 1, 1951 (729 days; retired)	Republican	Secretary of state acting	Acting as governor
21	Frank A. Barrett (1892–1962)	January 1, 1951 – January 3, 1953 (734 days; resigned) (Note: Barrett resigned, having been elected to the United States Senate.)	Republican	1950	Clifford Joy Rogers
22	Clifford Joy Rogers (1897–1962)	January 3, 1953 – January 3, 1955 (731 days; lost nomination)	Republican	Secretary of state acting	Acting as governor
23	Milward Simpson (1897–1993)	January 3, 1955 – January 5, 1959 (1464 days; lost election)	Republican	1954	Everett T. Copenhaver
24	Joe Hickey (1911–1970)	January 5, 1959 – January 2, 1961 (729 days; resigned) (Note: Hickey resigned so that his successor could appoint him to the United States Senate.)	Democratic	1958	Jack R. Gage
25	Jack R. Gage (1899–1970)	January 2, 1961 – January 7, 1963 (736 days; lost election)	Democratic	Secretary of state acting	Acting as governor
26	Clifford Hansen (1912–2009)	January 7, 1963 – January 2, 1967 (1457 days; retired) (Note: Hansen was instead elected to the United States Senate.)	Republican	1962	Thyra Thomson
27	Stanley K. Hathaway (1924–2005)	January 2, 1967 – January 6, 1975 (2927 days; retired)	Republican	1966	Thyra Thomson
27	Stanley K. Hathaway (1924–2005)	January 2, 1967 – January 6, 1975 (2927 days; retired)	Republican	1970	Thyra Thomson
28	Edgar Herschler (1918–1990)	January 6, 1975 – January 5, 1987 (4383 days; retired)	Democratic	1974	Thyra Thomson
28	Edgar Herschler (1918–1990)	January 6, 1975 – January 5, 1987 (4383 days; retired)	Democratic	1978	Thyra Thomson
28	Edgar Herschler (1918–1990)	January 6, 1975 – January 5, 1987 (4383 days; retired)	Democratic	1982	Thyra Thomson
29	Mike Sullivan (b. 1939)	January 5, 1987 – January 2, 1995 (2920 days; term-limited) (Note: Sullivan, being term-limited, (Note: Under a law passed in 1992, governors are limited to eight years in any period of sixteen years.) had already lost election to the United States Senate when his term ended.)	Democratic	1986	Kathy Karpan
29	Mike Sullivan (b. 1939)	January 5, 1987 – January 2, 1995 (2920 days; term-limited)	Democratic	1990	Kathy Karpan
30	Jim Geringer (b. 1944)	January 2, 1995 – January 6, 2003 (2927 days; term-limited)	Republican	1994	Diana Ohman
30	Jim Geringer (b. 1944)	January 2, 1995 – January 6, 2003 (2927 days; term-limited)	Republican	1998	Joseph Meyer
31	Dave Freudenthal (b. 1950)	January 6, 2003 – January 3, 2011 (2920 days; term-limited)	Democratic	2002	Joseph Meyer
31	Dave Freudenthal (b. 1950)	January 6, 2003 – January 3, 2011 (2920 days; term-limited)	Democratic	2006	Max Maxfield
32	Matt Mead (b. 1962)	January 3, 2011 – January 7, 2019 (2927 days; term-limited)	Republican	2010	Max Maxfield
32	Matt Mead (b. 1962)	January 3, 2011 – January 7, 2019 (2927 days; term-limited)	Republican	2014	Ed Murray
32	Matt Mead (b. 1962)	January 3, 2011 – January 7, 2019 (2927 days; term-limited)	Republican	2014	Edward Buchanan
33	Mark Gordon (b. 1957)	January 7, 2019 – Incumbent (Note: Gordon's second term began on January 2, 2023, and will expire on January 4, 2027; he is term-limited.) (in office 2877 days)	Republican	2018	Edward Buchanan
33	Mark Gordon (b. 1957)	January 7, 2019 – Incumbent (in office 2877 days)	Republican	2018	Karl Allred
33	Mark Gordon (b. 1957)	January 7, 2019 – Incumbent (in office 2877 days)	Republican	2022	Chuck Gray
34	Eric Barlow (b. 1966)	Governor-elect takes office January 4, 2027	Republican	2026	Robert Short

== Timeline ==
Timeline of Wyoming governors

== Electoral history (1950–) ==
Year	Democratic nominee			Republican nominee			Independent candidate			Libertarian nominee			Other candidate		
Year	Candidate	#	%	Candidate	#	%	Candidate	#	%	Candidate	#	%	Candidate	#	%
1950	John J. McIntyre	42,518	43.85%	Frank A. Barrett	54,441	56.15%	–			–			–		
1954	William M. Jack	55,163	49.50%	Milward Simpson	56,275	50.50%	–			–			–		
1958	John J. Hickey	55,070	48.94%	Milward Simpson	52,488	46.64%	Louis W. Carlson (Economy)	4,979	4.42%	–			–		
1962	Jack R. Gage	54,298	45.53%	Clifford Hansen	64,970	54.47%	–			–			–		
1966	Ernest Wilkerson	55,249	45.71%	Stanley K. Hathaway	65,624	54.29%	–			–			–		
1970	John J. Rooney	44,008	37.21%	Stanley K. Hathaway	74,249	62.79%	–			–			–		
1974	Edgar Herschler	71,741	55.88%	Dick Jones	56,645	44.12%	–			–			–		
1978	Edgar Herschler	69,972	50.86%	John Ostlund	67,595	49.14%	–			–			–		
1982	Edgar Herschler	106,427	63.14%	Warren A. Morton	62,128	36.86%	–			–			–		
1986	Mike Sullivan	88,879	53.96%	Pete Simpson	75,841	46.04%	–			–			–		
1990	Mike Sullivan	104,638	65.35%	Mary Mead	55,471	34.65%	–			–			–		
1994	Kathy Karpan	80,747	40.17%	Jim Geringer	104,638	58.72%	–			Seaghan Uibreaslain	2,227	1.11%	–		
1998	John Vinich	70,754	40.46%	Jim Geringer	97,235	55.60%	–			Dave Dawson	6,899	3.94%	–		
2002	Dave Freudenthal	92,662	49.96%	Eli Bebout	88,873	47.92%	–			Dave Dawson	3,924	2.12%	–		
2006	Dave Freudenthal	135,516	69.99%	Ray Hunkins	58,100	30.01%	–			–			–		
2010	Leslie Petersen	43,240	22.94%	Matt Mead	123,780	65.68%	Taylor Haynes	13,796	7.32%	Mike Wheeler	5,362	2.85%	–		
2014	Pete Gosar	45,752	27.25%	Matt Mead	99,700	59.39%	Don Wills	9,895	5.89%	Dee Cozzens	4,040	2.41%	–		
2018	Mary Throne	55,965	27.54%	Mark Gordon	136,412	67.12%	–			Lawrence Struempf	3,010	1.48%	Rex Rammell (Constitution)	6,751	3.32%
2022	Theresa Livingston	30,686	15.82%	Mark Gordon	143,696	74.04%	–			Jared Baldes	8,157	4.20%	–		

== See also ==
- Gubernatorial lines of succession in the United States § Wyoming
- Secretary of State of Wyoming
- List of Wyoming state legislatures

== Sources ==
- "Former Wyoming Governors". National Governors Association.
- "Wyoming Constitution". State Democracy Research Initiative. University of Wisconsin Law School.
- Glashan, Roy R. (1979). American Governors and Gubernatorial Elections, 1775-1978. Meckler Books. ISBN 0-7201-1511-6 – via Internet Archive.
- Kallenbach, Joseph E.; Kallenbach, Jessamine S. (1977). American State Governors, 1776-1976. Oceana Publications. ISBN 978-0-379-00665-0 – via Internet Archive.
- McMullin, Thomas A.; Walker, David (1984). Biographical Directory of American Territorial Governors. Meckler Publishing. ISBN 0-930466-11-X – via Internet Archive.
- Mullaney, Marie Marmo (1994). Biographical Directory of the Governors of the United States, 1988–1994. Greenwood Publishing Group. ISBN 0-313-28312-5 – via Internet Archive.
- Sobel, Robert; Raimo, John (1978). Biographical Directory of the Governors of the United States, 1789-1978. Vol. 4. Meckler Books. ISBN 0-930466-01-2 – via Internet Archive.
- Thorpe, Francis Newton, ed. (1909). The Federal and State Constitutions, Colonial Charters, and Other Organic Laws of the States, Territories, and Colonies Now or Heretofore Forming the United States of America. Vol. 7. United States Government Publishing Office – via Internet Archive.
