= 1890 Wyoming state elections =

A general election was held in the U.S. state of Wyoming on September 11, 1890, to elect the state's executive officers—the governor, secretary of state, auditor, treasurer, and superintendent of public instruction—which were created in the state constitution adopted in 1889. This was the first election in which these offices were for election. The Republican Party performed well, carrying all of them by double-digit margins.

== Governor ==
Incumbent Territorial Governor Francis E. Warren ran for re-election as governor, facing former Territorial Governor George W. Baxter, the Democratic nominee, in the general election. Warren defeated Baxter by a wide margin, but he did not serve as Governor for long. He was elected to the U.S. Senate a few weeks into his term and resigned as governor, elevating Secretary of State Amos W. Barber to the governorship and triggering a special election in 1892.

1890 Wyoming gubernatorial election
Party	Candidate	Votes	%
Republican	Francis E. Warren (inc.)	8,879	55.38%
Democratic	George W. Baxter	7,153	44.62%
Majority		1,726	10.77%
Total votes		16,032	100.00%
Republican hold			

== Secretary of state ==
Amos W. Barber, a surgeon from Cheyenne, was nominated by the Republicans for secretary of state. The Democratic Party nominated former Crook County Clerk John S. Harper. Barber defeated Harper by a wide margin to win his first, and only, term as secretary of state.

=== General election ===
==== Results ====
1890 Wyoming Secretary of State election
Party	Candidate	Votes	%
Republican	Amos W. Barber	8,701	55.57%
Democratic	John S. Harper	6,957	44.43%
Majority		1,744	11.14%
Total votes		15,658	100.00%
Republican hold		Swing	

== Auditor ==
In the race for auditor, the Republican convention nominated Charles W. Burdick, who served as a member of the Wyoming Territorial Council prior to statehood. He was challenged by George A. Campbell, the Democratic nominee. Burdick defeated Campbell by a wide margin to win the first election for state auditor.

=== General election ===
==== Results ====
1890 Wyoming Auditor election
Party	Candidate	Votes	%
Republican	Charles W. Burdick	8,483	54.65%
Democratic	George A. Campbell	7,038	45.35%
Majority		1,445	9.31%
Total votes		15,521	100.00%
Republican win (new seat)			

== State treasurer ==
The Republican convention nominated Otto Gramm, the Albany County Treasurer, as its nominee in the first statewide election for treasurer. The Democratic nominee was Isaac C. Miller, a wool grower from Rawlins. Gramm defeated Miller by a wide margin.

=== General election ===
==== Results ====
1890 Wyoming State Treasurer election
Party	Candidate	Votes	%
Republican	Otto Gramm	8,824	56.51%
Democratic	Isaac C. Miller	6,790	43.49%
Majority		2,034	13.03%
Total votes		15,614	100.00%
Republican win (new seat)			

== Superintendent of public instruction ==
At the Republican convention, Stephen T. Farwell, the former Johnson County Treasurer, was named as the Republican nominee for superintendent. The Democratic convention nominated Anthony V. Quinn, a former member of the Territorial Council. Farwell defeated Quinn by a wide margin.

=== General election ===
==== Results ====
1890 Wyoming Superintendent election
Party	Candidate	Votes	%
Republican	Stephen F. Farwell	8,765	56.73%
Democratic	Anthony V. Quinn	6,685	43.27%
Majority		2,080	13.46%
Total votes		1,545	100.00%
Republican win (new seat)			
