= Governor Barbour =

Governor Barbour may refer to:

- Haley Barbour (born 1947), 63rd Governor of Mississippi
- James Barbour (1775–1842), 18th Governor of Virginia

== See also ==
- Amos W. Barber (1861–1915), 2nd Governor of Wyoming
