= 3rd Wyoming Territorial Legislature =

Meeting of the Wyoming Legislature

←	2nd	4th	→
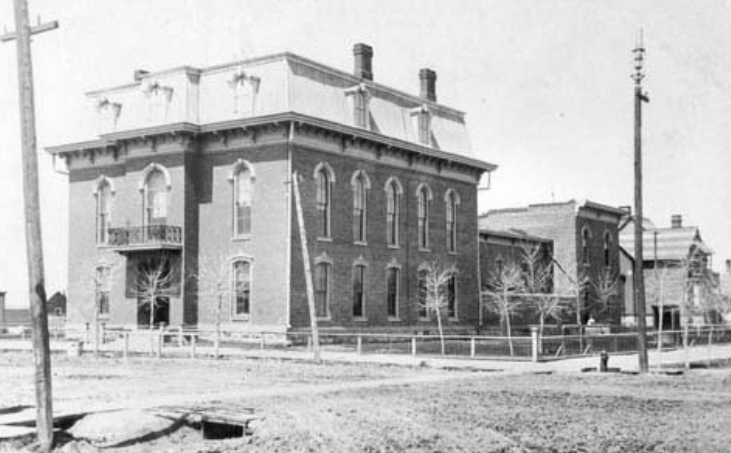
- The Laramie County Courthouse where the Council and House of Representatives convened

Overview
- Legislative body: Wyoming Legislature
- Jurisdiction: Wyoming Territory, United States
- Meeting place: Laramie County Courthouse
- Term: 1873–1875

Wyoming Council
- Members: 9 Senators
- President of the Council: Francis E. Warren
- Party control: Democratic

Wyoming House of Representatives
- Members: 13 Representatives
- Speaker of the House: S. H. Wilkinson
- Party control: Democratic

The 3rd Wyoming Territorial Legislature was a former meeting of the Wyoming Legislature that lasted from November 4, to December 12, 1873.

== History ==
=== Formation ===
On November 4, 1873, Joseph W. Fisher, Chief Justice of the Wyoming Supreme Court, swore in the members of the state legislature.

During the election of the Speaker of the House of Representatives, S. H. Wilkinson was nominated by H. Conley and N. L. Andrews was nominated by William H. Holliday. Ten members of the House voted for Wilkinson, two voted for N. L. Andrews, and one voted for C. A. Phippes. Secretary of the Territory Jason B. Brown ruled that Wilkinson won and Fisher inaugurated him as Speaker.

Francis E. Warren was selected to serve as the President of the Council.

== Membership ==
=== Council ===
Affiliation	Party (Shading indicates majority caucus)		Total	
Affiliation	Republican	Democratic	Total	Vacant
Beginning of 2nd Legislature	5	4	9	0
Latest voting share	55.56%	44.44%		

=== House of Representatives ===
Affiliation	Party (Shading indicates majority caucus)		Total	
Affiliation	Republican	Democratic	Total	Vacant
Beginning of 2nd Legislature	7	6	13	0
Latest voting share	53.85%	46.15%		

=== Members of the Wyoming House of Representatives ===
Representative	Party	Counties represented
N. L. Andrews		Albany
H. Conley		Laramie
A. E. Farley		Carbon
J. E. Ferris		Sweetwater
H. Haas		Laramie
William H. Holliday	Democratic	Albany
Jervis Joslin		Laramie
V. R. King		Albany
C. A. Phippes		Uinta
G. W. Ritter		Albany
C. L. Tisdale		Uinta
F. S. Whitney		Laramie
S. H. Wilkinson		Sweetwater
