= 1924 United States Senate election in Wyoming =

- November 4, 1924
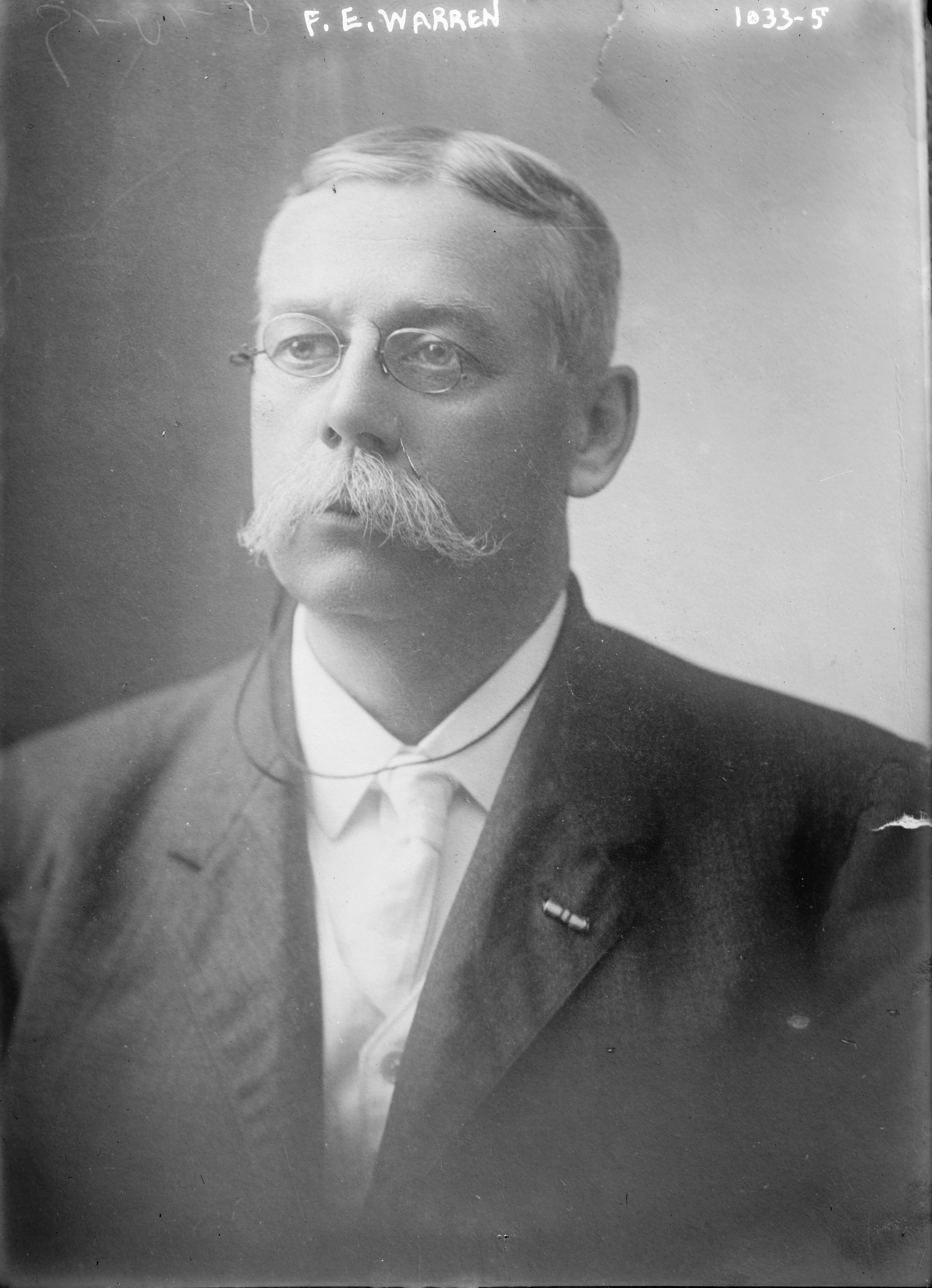

| Nominee | Francis E. Warren | Robert R. Rose |
| Party | Republican | Democratic |
| Popular vote | 41,293 | 33,536 |
| Percentage | 55.18% | 44.82% |
- County results Warren: 50–60% 60–70% 70–80% Rose: 50–60%
U.S. senator before election
Francis E. Warren
Republican
Elected U.S. Senator
Francis E. Warren
Republican

The 1924 United States Senate election in Wyoming took place on November 4, 1924. Incumbent Republican Senator Francis E. Warren ran for re-election to his sixth consecutive term in the Senate. He was challenged by Judge Robert Rose of the Eighth Judicial District of Wyoming, the Democratic nominee. The election took place on the same ballot as the presidential election, with Republican Calvin Coolidge winning Wyoming by a wide margin, and the special gubernatorial election, with Democratic Nellie Tayloe Ross similarly winning by a wide margin. Both Warren and Rose outperformed their party's presidential nominees, and Warren ultimately won re-election by a wide margin, albeit reduced from 1918. This would be Warren's last term in the Senate; he died on November 24, 1929, with a little more than a year remaining in his term. Republican Patrick Joseph Sullivan was appointed to replace him.

== Democratic primary ==
=== Candidates ===
- Robert R. Rose, Judge on the Eighth Judicial District of Wyoming
- Joseph C. O'Mahoney, Vice-chair of the Wyoming Democratic Party
- L. E. Laird, state highway commissioner

=== Results ===
Democratic primary
| Party | Candidate | Votes | % |
|---|---|---|---|
| Democratic | Robert R. Rose | 6,906 | 46.71% |
| Democratic | Joseph C. O'Mahoney | 4,480 | 30.30% |
| Democratic | L. E. Laird | 3,400 | 22.99% |
| Total votes | | 14,786 | 100.00% |

== Republican primary ==
=== Candidates ===
- Francis E. Warren, incumbent U.S. Senator

=== Results ===
Republican primary
| Party | Candidate | Votes | % |
|---|---|---|---|
| Republican | Francis E. Warren (inc.) | 22,721 | 100.00% |
| Total votes | | 22,721 | 100.00% |

== General election ==
=== Results ===
1924 United States Senate election in Wyoming
| Party | Candidate | Votes | % | ±% |
|---|---|---|---|---|
| Republican | Francis E. Warren (inc.) | 41,293 | 55.18% | −2.58% |
| Democratic | Robert R. Rose | 33,536 | 44.82% | +2.58% |
| Majority | | 7,757 | 10.37% | −5.17% |
| Turnout | | 74,829 | | |
| Republican hold | | | | |
