= Governorship of Mark Gordon =

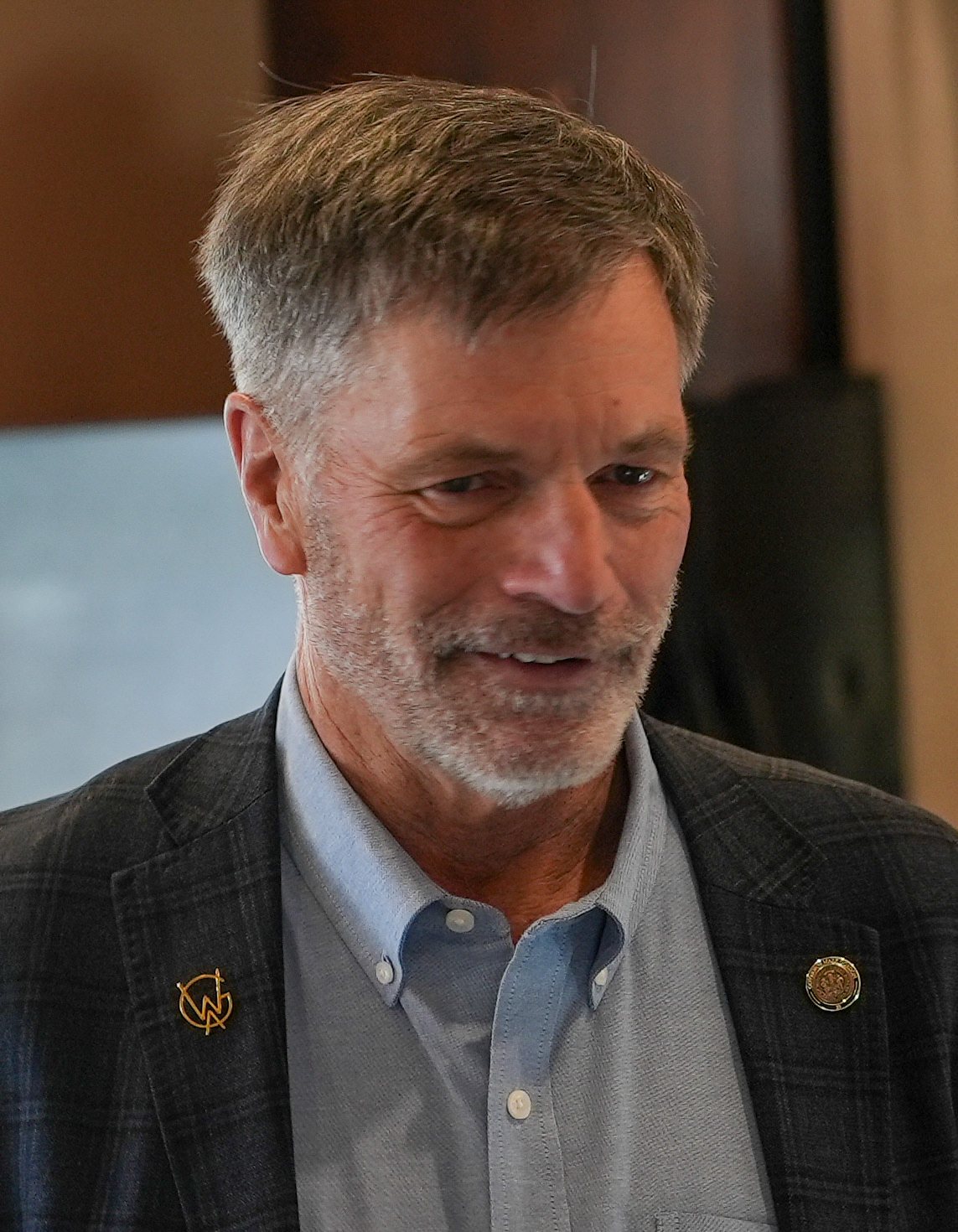
- Governorship of Mark Gordon; January 7, 2019 – present
- Party: Republican
- Election: 2018; 2022
- Seat: Wyoming Governor's Mansion
- Seal of Wyoming

Mark Gordon has served as the 33rd governor of Wyoming since January 7, 2019. A member of the Republican Party, he defeated Democratic challenger Mary Throne in the 2018 Wyoming gubernatorial election in a landslide victory. As governor, Gordon imposed some restrictions on indoor and outdoor public gatherings. He did not implement curfews, temporarily close any businesses or initially impose a statewide mask mandate. Gordon and his wife, Jennie Gordon, contracted COVID-19 later in the month. In December 2020, Gordon imposed a statewide mask mandate. In February 2021, he extended that order until the end of the month. On March 8, 2021, he announced that he would lift the mask mandate on March 16. On March 16, the mask mandate was lifted. As of March 30, Gordon has no plans to reinstate the mask mandate. He was also reelected in a landslide in the 2022 Wyoming gubernatorial election; his 74.07% margin of victory over Theresa Livingston was the state's largest victory ever since. He has generally governed as a conservative.

== 2018 gubernatorial election ==
Gordon declined to run for Cynthia Lummis's seat in the U.S. House of Representatives in 2016, the one he ran for in 2008, and instead ran for governor of Wyoming in 2018. He won the Republican primary on August 21 and the general election on November 6, defeating Democratic state representative Mary Throne. Gordon was inaugurated on January 7, 2019.

Results of the 2018 Wyoming gubernatorial election by county

He won with 67.12 percent against Throne's 27.54 percent. Remaining as the highest percentage ever seen.

== 2022 gubernatorial election ==
2022 election results map by county

Gordon was reelected to a second term against Democratic nominee Theresa Livingston in the general election, with Gordon's 74.07 percent against Livingston's 15.82 percent will be the highest percentage of a candidate ever in Wyoming and the lowest for Livingston. This was also the first election that a candidate won all counties since 2010, and the first that a candidate lost all.

== Policies ==
=== COVID-19 ===
Gordon imposed some restrictions on indoor and outdoor public gatherings. He did not implement curfews, temporarily close any businesses or initially impose a statewide mask mandate. Gordon and his wife, Jennie Gordon, contracted COVID-19 later in the month. In December 2020, Gordon imposed a statewide mask mandate. In February 2021, he extended that order until the end of the month. On March 8, 2021, he announced that he would lift the mask mandate on March 16. On March 16, the mask mandate was lifted. As of March 30, Gordon has no plans to reinstate the mask mandate.

=== Economy ===
In November 2020, Gordon proposed $500 million in cuts to the Wyoming budget to account for declining revenue from the fossil fuel industry (particularly coal mining), which is crucial to Wyoming's economy. On April 2, 2021, he signed a budget passed by the Wyoming legislature that cut $430 million instead of the $500 million Gordon proposed, due to improved budget forecasts for the year of 2021 and supplemental money from the American Rescue Plan Act signed by President Biden. The budget Gordon signed decreases the amount cut to the University of Wyoming and the Wyoming Department of Health.

=== Environment ===
In 2021, a New York Times investigation revealed that Gordon had been targeted by hard-right conservatives, such as Susan Gore, the heiress to the Gore-Tex fortune. Gore funded secret operatives who targeted Gordon. Part of this is due to Gordon's investment in renewable energy and policy on climate change, which led to a vote of no confidence by the state party. Gordon has embraced wind energy as a part of Wyoming's economic exports, such as the developing Chokecherry and Sierra Madre Wind Energy Project.

=== Abortion ===
On March 18, 2023, Gordon signed SF0109 into law, which banned abortion pills in Wyoming.

=== Social ===
==== Polling ====
As of 2022, Gordon often polls as one of the nation's most popular governors.

==== Ban ====
On March 7, 2024, Gordon banned Delta 8 hemp in Wyoming.

== See also ==
- Governorship of Ron DeSantis
- Governorship of Arnold Schwarzenegger
- Governorship of Rick Perry
- Governorship of George W. Bush
