= 1904 Wyoming gubernatorial special election =

- November 8, 1904
- Turnout: 33.40% of total population ▲6.33
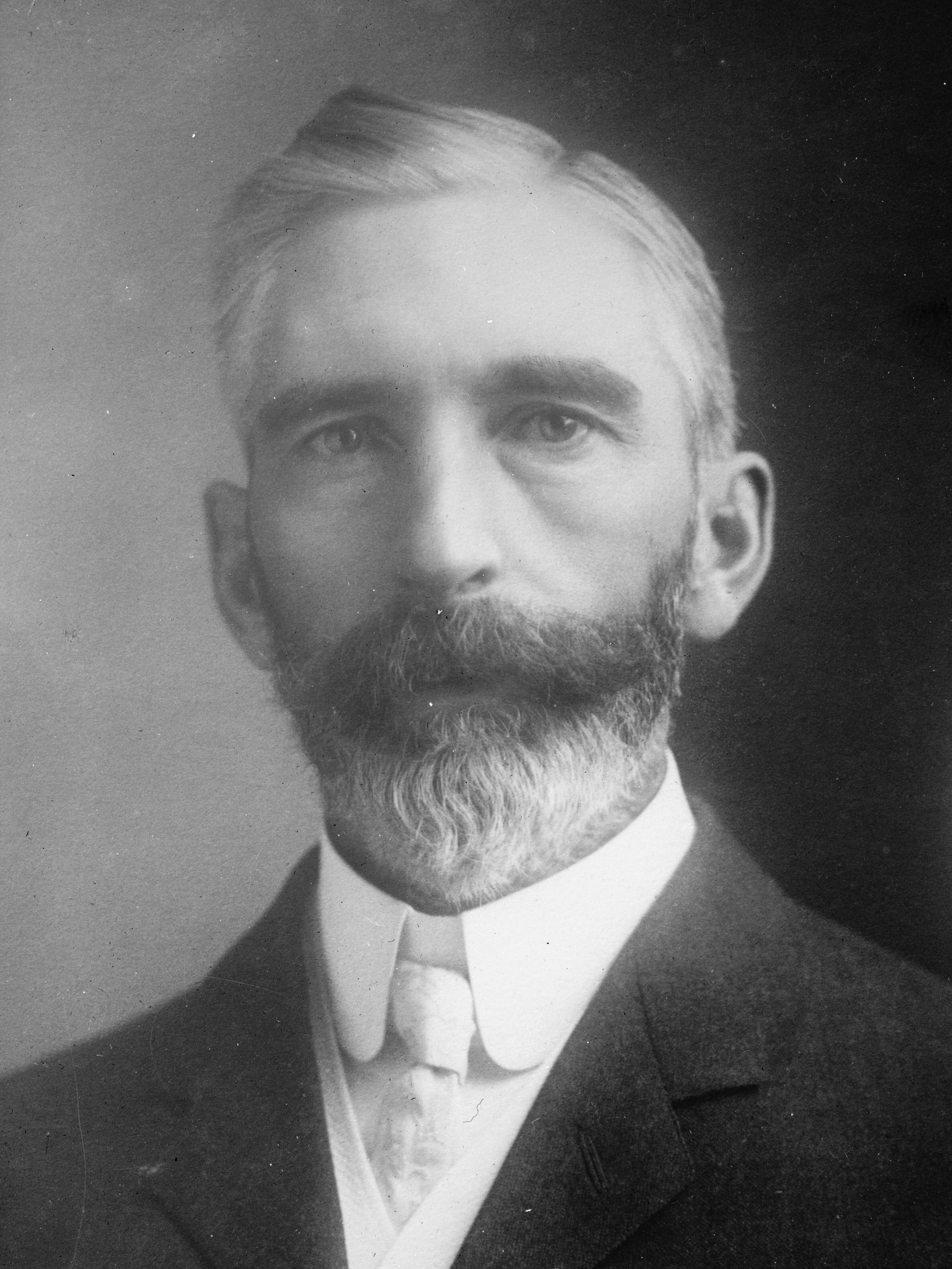

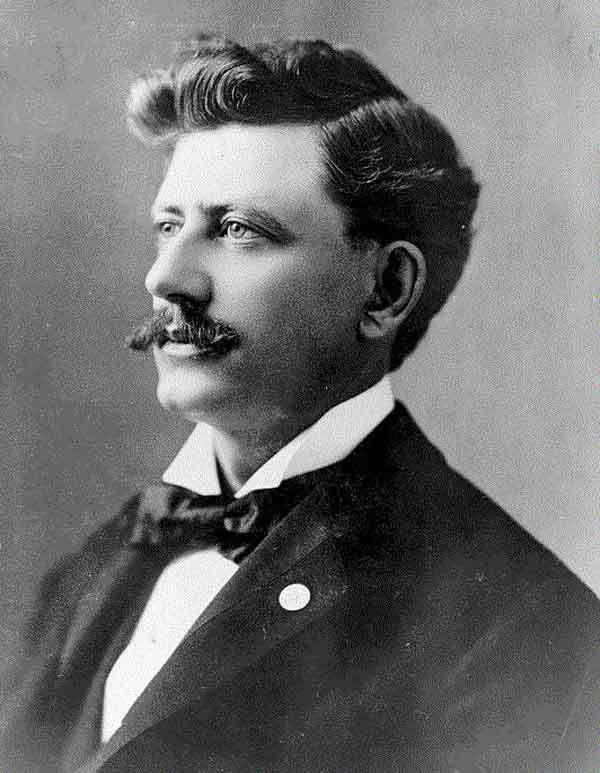
Nominee	Bryant B. Brooks	John E. Osborne
Party	Republican	Democratic
Popular vote	17,765	12,137
Percentage	57.48%	39.27%
- County results Brooks: 50–60% 60–70% 70–80% Osborne: 50–60%
Governor before election
Fenimore Chatterton
Republican
Elected Governor
Bryant B. Brooks
Republican

The 1904 Wyoming gubernatorial special election was held on November 8, 1904. Shortly after he began his second term in 1903, Governor DeForest Richards died in office, elevating Secretary of State Fenimore Chatterton to the Governorship and triggering a special election in 1904 to fill the balance of Richards's term. Chatterton ran for re-election, but was defeated for renomination at the Republican convention by Bryant B. Brooks. Former Congressman John E. Osborne, the former Territorial Governor, was nominated by the Democratic Party. Aided by President Theodore Roosevelt's landslide victory over Democrat Alton B. Parker in the presidential election, Brooks overwhelmingly defeated Osborne.

== Party conventions ==
As the Republican convention began on May 18, 1904, former State Representative Bryant B. Brooks was seen as having a slight edge over acting Governor Fenimore Chatterton, with the leading rumor that the Laramie County delegation held the balance of power and favored Brooks over Chatterton. Ultimately, the contest between Brooks and Chatterton was not close, with Brooks defeating the incumbent Governor on the first ballot with 83 votes to Chatterton's 41.

Meanwhile, as the Democratic convention began on September 7, 1904, several candidates were seen as likely nominees: former Congressman and Territorial Governor John E. Osborne; former State Senator William H. Holliday, the 1894 Democratic nominee for Governor; Robert H. Homer, a former territorial legislator; and W. Dean Hays, with Osborne seen as the frontrunner. After several days of indecision, Osborne—who had been reluctant to run—allowed himself to be nominated and he was approved by acclamation.

== General election ==
=== Results ===
1904 Wyoming gubernatorial special election
Party	Candidate	Votes	%	±%
Republican	Bryant B. Brooks	17,765	57.48%	−0.34%
Democratic	John E. Osborne	10,017	39.98%	−0.72%
Socialist	James W. Gates	816	2.64%	+0.44%
Prohibition	George W. Blain	191	0.62%	—
Majority		5,628	18.21%	+0.38%
Turnout		30,909	100.00%	
Republican hold				

=== Results by county ===
County	Brooks	Votes	Osborne	Votes	Gates	Votes	Blain	Votes
Uinta	58.39%	2,553	38.04%	1,663	3.29%	144	0.27%	12
Big Horn	66.79%	1,868	31.82%	890	1.04%	29	0.36%	10
Fremont	47.06%	775	52.46%	864	0.43%	7	0.06%	1
Sweetwater	52.15%	1,078	42.86%	886	4.55%	94	0.44%	9
Sheridan	56.24%	1,798	38.25%	1,223	4.94%	158	0.56%	18
Johnson	50.48%	680	39.27%	529	6.24%	84	4.01%	54
Natrona	50.78%	553	48.58%	529	0.09%	1	0.55%	6
Carbon	55.24%	1,823	43.12%	1,423	1.61%	53	0.03%	1
Crook	61.23%	938	35.51%	544	2.68%	41	0.59%	9
Weston	73.18%	756	25.56%	264	1.16%	12	0.10%	1
Converse	67.50%	1,024	30.98%	470	0.13%	2	1.38%	21
Albany	56.82%	1,492	34.39%	903	6.97%	183	1.83%	48
Laramie	55.37%	2,427	44.47%	1,949	0.02%	1	0.14%	6
