= 1894 Wyoming gubernatorial election =

- November 6, 1894
- Turnout: 31.78% of Total Population ▲3.35
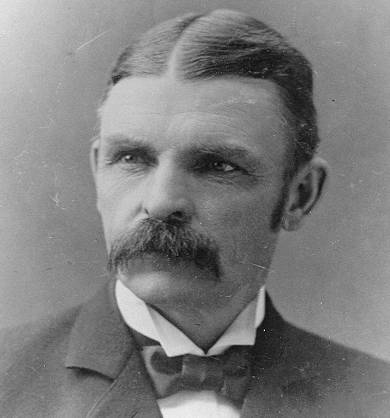

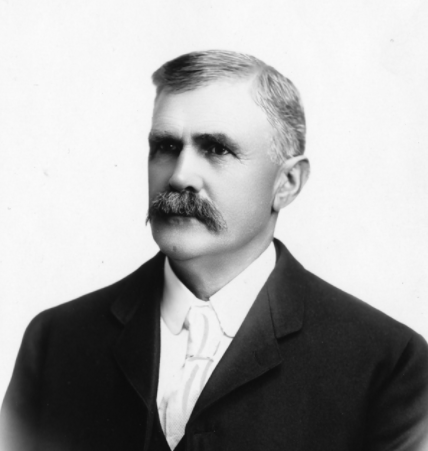

Nominee	William A. Richards	William H. Holliday	Lewis C. Tidball
Party	Republican	Democratic	Populist
Popular vote	10,149	6,965	2,176
Percentage	52.61%	36.11%	11.28%
County Results
Richards
40–50%
50–60%
Holliday
40–50%
No Data/Vote
Governor before election
John E. Osborne
Democratic
Elected Governor
William A. Richards
Republican

The 1894 Wyoming gubernatorial election was held on November 6, 1894. Democratic Governor John E. Osborne, first elected in the 1892 special election, declined to seek re-election to a second term, instead aiming to be elected to the U.S. Senate. In part because of a backlash against the Democratic Party owing to the Panic of 1893, Republicans won the governorship back from the Democrats, and would hold onto it until 1914.

== Party conventions ==
The Democratic Party nominated State Senator William H. Holliday to succeed Osborne, and adopted a free silver platform, favoring the coinage of silver at a ratio of 16 to 1. The Republican Party nominated William A. Richards, the Surveyor General for Wyoming and a former Johnson County Commissioner, by acclamation. Its platform concurred with the Democratic Party's on free silver coinage at the same ratio and "refer[red] to the history of the past nineteen months as indicating the unfitness of democrats to rule the country[.]"

Meanwhile, the Populist Party, which had fused with the Democratic Party in several past elections in Wyoming, declined to do so again in 1894, and nominated for Governor Lewis C. Tidball, who served as Speaker of the Wyoming House of Representatives from 1893 to 1895 under the Democratic-Populist fusion majority.

== General election ==
=== Results ===
1894 Wyoming gubernatorial election
Party	Candidate	Votes	%	±%
Republican	William A. Richards	10,149	52.61%	+9.10%
Democratic	William H. Holliday	6,965	36.11%	−17.73%
Populist	Lewis C. Tidball	2,176	11.28%	—
Majority		3,184	16.51%	+6.18%
Turnout		19,290	100.00%	
Republican gain from Democratic				
