= William H. Holliday =

American politician

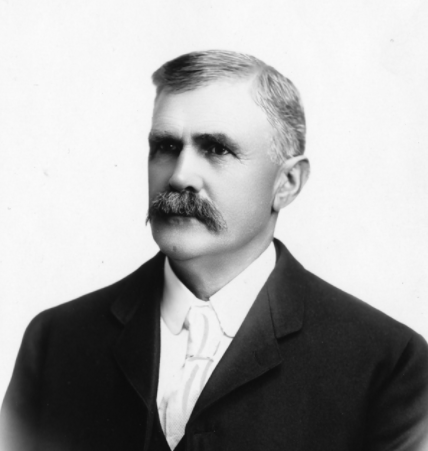

Member of the Wyoming Senate
- In office November 5, 1875 – December 15, 1877
- In office January 8, 1884 – March 7, 1884
- In office January 10, 1888 – March 9, 1888
- In office January 10, 1893 – January 12, 1897
- In office January 12, 1909 – January 9, 1917

President of the Wyoming Council
- In office January 8, 1884 – January 12, 1886

Member of the House of Representatives from Albany County
- In office November 4, 1873 – December 12, 1873

Personal details
- Born: William Helmus Holliday; May 21, 1843; Green Township, Ohio, U.S.
- Died: February 20, 1925 (aged 81); Laramie, Wyoming, U.S.
- Political party: Democratic
- Spouse(s): Emily R. Coykendall; Mayme Kennedy
- Children: 5

William Helmus Holliday (May 21, 1843 – February 20, 1925) was an American politician who served in the territorial and statehood Wyoming Legislature as a member of the Democratic Party.

== Early life ==
William Helmus Holliday was born on May 21, 1843, in Green Township, Ohio, to Eli Holliday and Annetta Bogart. In 1858, his family moved to Douglas County, Illinois and later moved to Jackson County in 1863. In 1865, he left his family and moved to the Colorado Territory. In September 1867, he moved to Albany County, Wyoming Territory while working at a sawmill. In 1873, he moved to Laramie.

On May 5, 1869, Holliday married Emily R. Coykendall and had three children with her; their marriage lasted until her death on June 19, 1887. On February 20, 1897, he married Mayme Kennedy and had two children with her.

== Career ==
=== State legislature ===
In 1871, he ran for election to the 2nd Wyoming Territorial Legislature, but was defeated. In 1873, he was elected to the 3rd Wyoming Territorial Legislature as a member of the House of Representatives. During the 3rd legislative session he, H. Conley, and N. L. Andrews nominated S. H. Wilkinson for Speaker of the House of Representatives and voted for Wilkinson alongside nine other members of the House.

In 1875, he was elected to the Council and was reelected in 1877. In 1884 and 1888, he was elected to the council. On January 9, 1884, Robert H. Homer made a motion to have Holliday selected as President of the council and it was accepted. From 1893 to 1897, he served in the state Senate, and again from 1909 to 1917.

=== Politics ===
During the 1882 elections, he ran as a candidate for Wyoming's delegate to the United States House of Representatives. From 1896 to 1990, he served as a member of the Democratic National Committee. In 1908, he served as a delegate to the Democratic national convention.

On August 9, 1894, he was selected as the Democratic nominee for the gubernatorial election at the Democratic state convention. In the general election he was defeated by William A. Richards, the Republican nominee.

Party political offices
Preceded by John Eugene Osborne	Democratic nominee for Governor of Wyoming; 1894	Succeeded by Horace C. Alger
