= Elliot S. N. Morgan =

American politician (1832–1894)

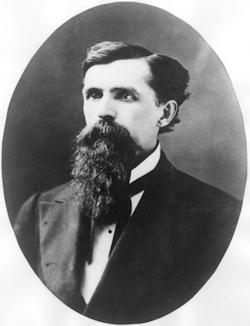

5th Governor of Wyoming Territory
- In office January 13, 1885 – February 28, 1885
- Preceded by: William Hale
- Succeeded by: Francis E. Warren

8th Governor of Wyoming Territory
- In office December 20, 1886 – January 24, 1887
- Preceded by: George W. Baxter
- Succeeded by: Thomas Moonlight

Personal details
- Born: 1832 Pittsburgh, Pennsylvania, U.S.
- Died: April 24, 1894 (aged 61 or 62) Cheyenne, Wyoming, U.S.
- Party: Republican

Elliot S. N. Morgan (1832 – April 24, 1894) was an American politician from Pennsylvania. Morgan served as Acting Governor of Wyoming Territory in 1885, and again from 1886 to 1887.

== Early life ==
Born in Pittsburgh, Pennsylvania, Morgan worked in his father's store. He served in the Pennsylvania House of Representatives in 1873 as a Republican and was re-elected. After his term as territorial secretary, he stayed in Wyoming and served in the Wyoming constitutional convention and practiced law.

== Acting Governor ==
Morgan was the only person to serve as Acting Governor of the Wyoming Territory before the region became an official U.S. state. When Governor William Hale died in office in early 1885, Morgan served as Acting Governor for forty-six days, from January 13, 1885, to February 28, 1885.

Morgan served as Acting Governor again from December 20, 1886, to January 24, 1887, following the resignation of Governor George W. Baxter.

Morgan was serving as the secretary of the territory when he assumed the official duties of the Governorship. In both instances, Morgan served as Governor until a new presidential appointee could take office.

== Family life ==
Was the second son of George Cheesman and Lucinda (Neal) Morgan and was born in Pittsburgh, PA January 19, 1832. He was educated in common schools and academies of his native city and of New Castle, Pennsylvania. His family moved to New Castle in 1839 back to Pittsburgh in 1846 and back to New Castle permanently in 1852. He married Laura Spiese, daughter of Samuel Spiese and Eliza McCleary of New Castle and the two had five children. He was a member and deacon of the First Presbyterian church of New Castle. He died April 20, 1894, in Cheyenne at the age of 62 leaving behind a wife and three children. He was brought back to New Castle for burial. His wife Laura A. Spiese died July 21, 1932, at her daughter's home in Chicago and she joined her husband at Greenwood Cemetery, New Castle, PA. Morgan is the uncle of historian William J. Morgan.
