= Meldrum Mountain =

Mountain peak in the United States

- Location within Montana

Highest point
- Elevation: 9,468 ft (2,886 m)
- Coordinates: 45°02′51″N 111°00′57″W

Geography
- Location: Yellowstone National Park, Gallatin County, Montana
- Parent range: Gallatin Range

Meldrum Mountain el. 9,468 feet (2,886 m) is a mountain peak in the southwestern section of the Gallatin Range in the Montana portion of Yellowstone National Park. The mountain was named in 1962 by the National Park Service for Judge John W. Meldrum (born September 17, 1843, died February 27, 1936) the first U.S. Commissioner in Yellowstone National Park, a position he held for 41 years (1894-1935).

== See also ==
- Mountains and mountain ranges of Yellowstone National Park
