= 1892 Wyoming gubernatorial special election =

- November 6, 1892
- Turnout: 28.43% of total population ▲2.02
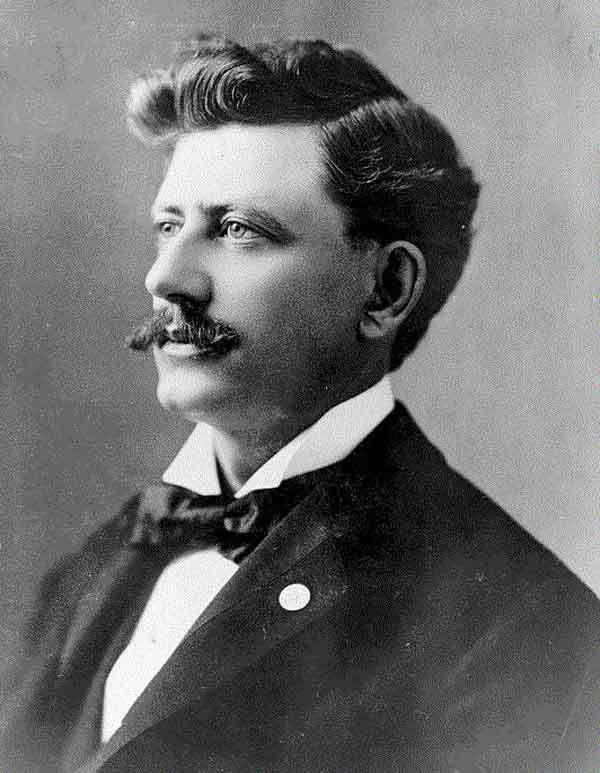

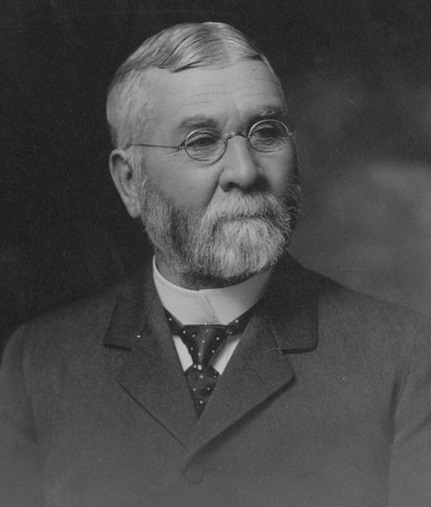
Nominee	John Eugene Osborne	Edward Ivinson
Party	Democratic	Republican
Popular vote	9,290	7,509
Percentage	53.84%	43.52%
- County results Osborne: 50–60% 70–80% Ivinson: 40–50% No Data/Vote
Governor before election
Amos W. Barber
Republican
Elected Governor
John Eugene Osborne
Democratic

The 1892 Wyoming gubernatorial special election was held on November 6, 1892. Republican Governor Francis E. Warren, who was elected in 1890, resigned several weeks into his term after being elected to the U.S. Senate by the state legislature, elevating Secretary of State Amos W. Barber to the governorship and triggering a special election for the balance of Warren's term.

The Republican Party nominated banker Edward Ivinson for Governor and Democrats nominated former State Representative and former Rawlins Mayor John E. Osborne. In an election that was largely defined by the Johnson County War, in which cattle companies, supported by the state's Republican establishment, attacked alleged rustlers and homesteaders in the Powder River Country. The Republican support for the Wyoming Stock Growers Association severely hurt the party's performance across the state, as Osborne centered his campaign around his opposition to the invasion. Osborne defeated Ivinson by a wide margin, Democrats won a majority in the Wyoming Legislature, and Republican Benjamin Harrison barely won the state in the 1892 presidential election.

== Party conventions ==
Prior to the adoption of Wyoming's primary law in 1911, the political parties nominated their candidates for office by convention. Both the Democratic and Republican conventions were hotly contested and drawn-out. As the Democratic convention started, two candidates were seen as the frontrunners: former State Senator Leopold Kabis and J. J. Hart. During the convention, Kabis, Hart, and former State Senator William H. Holliday earned strong support and were unwilling to yield, resulting in more than thirty ballots without a nominee. On the thirty-seventh ballot, Kabis withdrew from consideration and Osborne emerged as a compromise candidate, winning the nomination.

At the Republican convention, three frontrunners emerged: retired banker Edward Ivinson, banker DeForest Richards, and State Senator Frank W. Mondell. The contest among all three men was close, but on the tenth ballot, Richards withdrew from consideration and Ivinson was nominated over Mondell by a vote of 70 to 33.

== General election ==
=== Results ===
1892 Wyoming gubernatorial special election
Party	Candidate	Votes	%	±%
Democratic	John E. Osborne	9,290	53.84%	+9.22%
Republican	Edward Ivinson	7,509	43.52%	−11.87%
Prohibition	William Brown	421	2.44%	—
Write-ins		36	0.21%	—
Majority		1,781	10.32%	−0.44%
Turnout		17,256	100.00%	
Democratic gain from Republican				
