= 2022 Wyoming gubernatorial election =

- November 8, 2022
- Turnout: 66.59% ▼
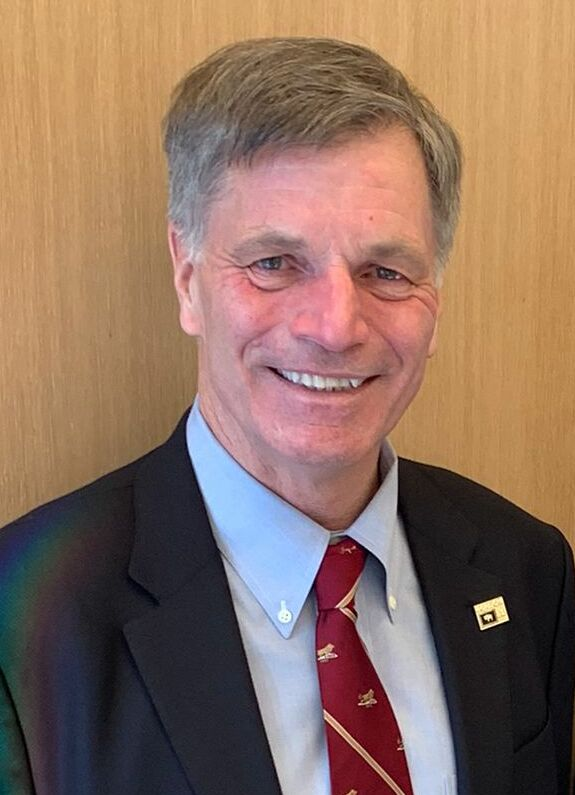

Nominee	Mark Gordon	Theresa Livingston	Write-in
Party	Republican	Democratic
Popular vote	143,696	30,686	11,461
Percentage	74.07%	15.82%	5.91%
- County results Gordon: 40–50% 50–60% 60–70% 70–80% 80–90%
Governor before election
Mark Gordon
Republican
Elected Governor
Mark Gordon
Republican

The 2022 Wyoming gubernatorial election took place on November 8, 2022, to elect the governor of Wyoming. Incumbent Republican governor Mark Gordon won a second term against Democratic Wyoming State Facilities Commission member Theresa Livingston.

Livingston's vote percentage was the lowest for a Democratic candidate running for governor in Wyoming since it was admitted to the union in 1890, falling short of Leslie Petersen's 22.90% performance in 2010. Gordon won by the widest margin in the state's history, winning by 58 points and becoming the first Republican to win every county since 2010.

Livingston's 15.8% of the vote was the weakest performance by a major party nominee in any state since that of Republican Dan Maes in Colorado in 2010; however, that election featured a candidate from the Constitution Party taking 36.38% of the vote. Livingston's performance was also the worst in a contested race between only the two major parties since Republican Elvin McCary's 14.8% in Alabama in 1974.

== Republican primary ==
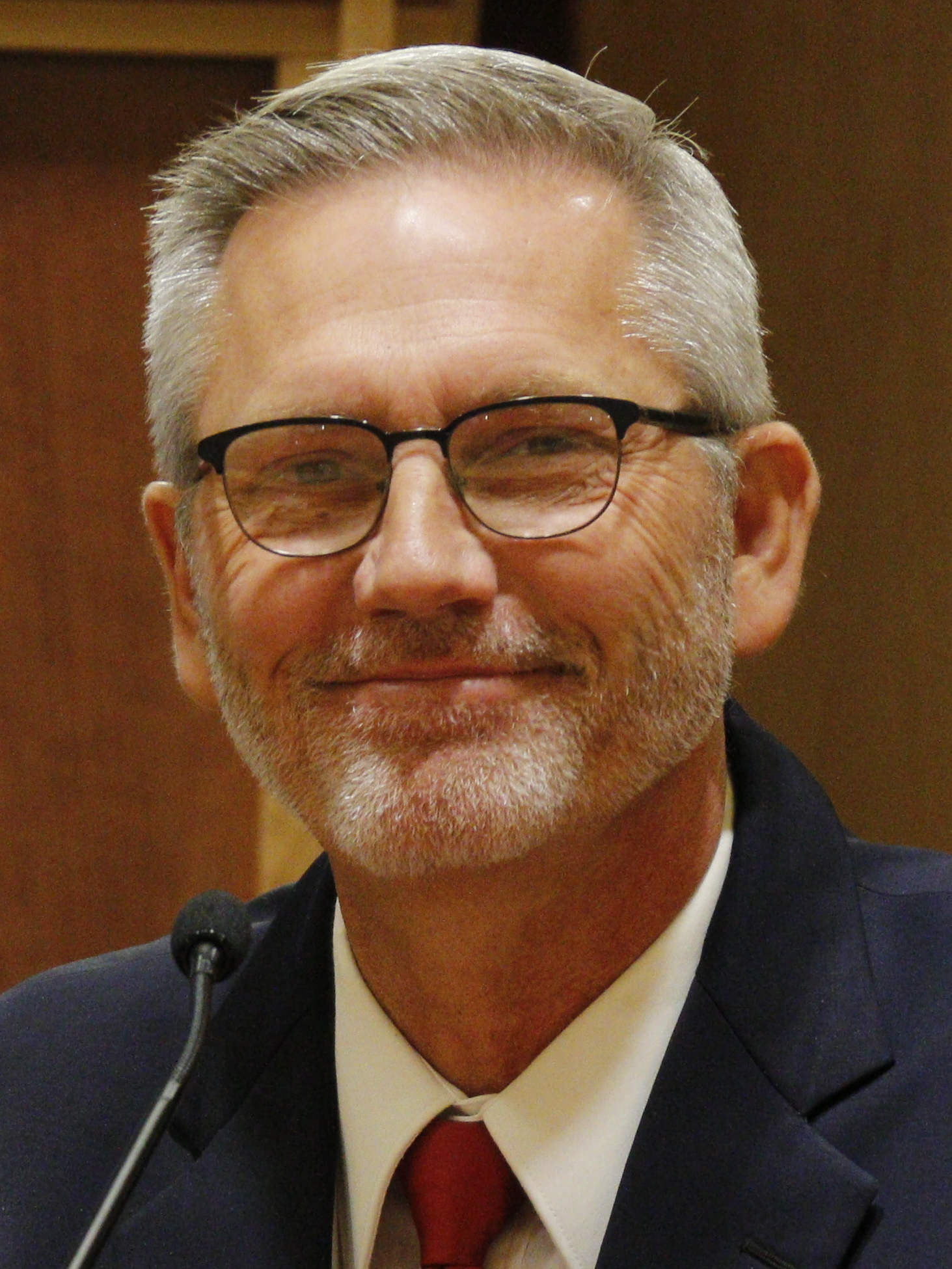
Veterinarian Rex Rammell finished third in the primary.

=== Candidates ===
==== Nominee ====
- Mark Gordon, incumbent governor

==== Eliminated in primary ====
- Brent Bien, civil engineer and retired U.S. Marine Corps colonel
- James Scott Quick, businessman
- Rex Rammell, veterinarian and perennial candidate

==== Declined ====
- Bo Biteman, state senator (ran for re-election)
- Darin Smith, attorney, Christian Broadcasting Network executive, and withdrawn candidate for Wyoming's at-large congressional district in 2022

=== Endorsements ===
Mark Gordon

State officials

- Kristi Noem, Governor of South Dakota

Individuals

- Lynnette Friess, widow of Foster Friess

=== Polling ===
Poll source	Date(s) administered	Sample size (Note: Key: A – all adults RV – registered voters LV – likely voters V – unclear)	Margin of error	Brent Bien	Mark Gordon	James Quick	Rex Rammell	Undecided
University of Wyoming	Jul 25 – Aug 6, 2022	562 (LV)	± 4.1%	14%	54%	1%	4%	28%

=== Results ===
Results by county: Gordon: 40–50%; 50–60%; 60–70%; 70–80%; 80–90%; Bien: 40–50%; 50–60%

Republican primary results
Party	Candidate	Votes	%
Republican	Mark Gordon (incumbent)	101,092	61.7
Republican	Brent Bien	48,549	29.7
Republican	Rex Rammell	9,373	5.7
Republican	James Scott Quick	4,725	2.9
Total votes		163,739	100.0

== Democratic primary ==
=== Candidates ===
==== Nominee ====
- Theresa Livingston, member of the Wyoming State School Facilities Commission

==== Eliminated in primary ====
- Rex Wilde, cabinet maker and perennial candidate

=== Results ===
Results by county: Livingston: 50–60%; 60–70%; 70–80%; 80–90%; Livingston-Wilde tie: 40–50%

Democratic primary results
Party	Candidate	Votes	%
Democratic	Theresa Livingston	4,989	71.2
Democratic	Rex Wilde	2,016	28.8
Total votes		7,005	100.0

== Libertarian convention ==
=== Candidates ===
==== Nominee ====
- Jared Baldes

== General election ==
Though Brent Bien had lost in the Republican primary to Mark Gordon, Bien's supporters ran a write-in campaign for him in the general election.

=== Candidates ===
- Mark Gordon (Republican), incumbent governor
- Theresa Livingston (Democratic), member of the Wyoming State School Facilities Commission
- Brent Bien (Republican, write-in), civil engineer, retired U.S. Marine Corps colonel, and candidate in the Republican primary
- Jared Baldes (Libertarian)

=== Predictions ===
Source	Ranking	As of
The Cook Political Report	Solid R	July 26, 2022
Inside Elections	Solid R	July 22, 2022
Sabato's Crystal Ball	Safe R	June 29, 2022
Politico	Solid R	April 1, 2022
RCP	Safe R	January 10, 2022
Fox News	Solid R	May 12, 2022
538	Solid R	July 31, 2022
Elections Daily	Safe R	November 7, 2022

=== Results ===
General election results map by county with pie charts. Sizes of pie charts are proportional to the number of votes cast.

2022 Wyoming gubernatorial election
Party	Candidate	Votes	%	±%
Republican	Mark Gordon (incumbent)	143,696	74.07%	+6.95%
Democratic	Theresa Livingston	30,686	15.82%	−11.72%
Write-in		11,461	5.91%	+5.37%
Libertarian	Jared Baldes	8,157	4.20%	+2.72%
Total votes		194,000	100.0%	
Turnout		198,198	66.59%	
Registered electors		297,639		
Republican hold				

==== By county ====
County	Mark Gordon Republican		Theresa Livingston Democratic		Write-in		Jared Baldes Libertarian		Margin		Total
County	Votes	%	Votes	%	Votes	%	Votes	%	Votes	%	Total
Albany	7,462	59.22%	4,143	32.88%	611	4.85%	384	3.05%	3,319	26.34%	12,600
Big Horn	3,529	83.25%	305	7.20%	249	5.87%	156	3.68%	3,224	76.06%	4,239
Campbell	9,787	79.82%	757	6.17%	880	7.18%	838	6.83%	8,907 (Note: In counties where the write-in votes placed second, ahead of Livingston, the margin given is Gordon's vote and percentage minus the write-in vote and percentage.)	72.64%	12,262
Carbon	3,681	78.27%	598	12.72%	191	4.06%	233	4.95%	3,083	65.55%	4,703
Converse	3,796	76.27%	355	7.13%	536	10.77%	290	5.83%	3,441	69.14%	4,977
Crook	2,516	77.46%	200	6.16%	359	11.05%	173	5.33%	2,157	66.41%	3,248
Fremont	9,866	73.64%	1,939	14.47%	719	5.37%	802	5.99%	7,927	59.17%	13,398
Goshen	3,972	82.53%	440	9.14%	211	4.38%	190	3.95%	3,532	73.38%	4,813
Hot Springs	1,525	70.24%	218	10.04%	331	15.25%	97	4.47%	1,194	55.00%	2,171
Johnson	3,182	82.33%	268	6.93%	299	7.74%	116	3.00%	2,883	74.59%	3,865
Laramie	22,067	73.78%	5,765	19.27%	1,014	3.39%	1,065	3.56%	16,302	54.50%	29,911
Lincoln	6,021	80.47%	699	9.34%	488	6.52%	274	3.66%	5,322	71.13%	7,482
Natrona	17,246	76.68%	3,303	14.69%	898	3.99%	1,044	4.64%	13,943	61.99%	22,491
Niobrara	704	67.24%	46	4.39%	251	23.97%	46	4.39%	407	24.83%	1,047
Park	9,700	76.39%	1,286	10.13%	1,284	10.11%	428	3.37%	8,414	66.26%	12,698
Platte	2,915	74.34%	411	10.48%	402	10.25%	193	4.92%	2,504	63.86%	3,921
Sheridan	9,335	76.57%	1,616	13.26%	871	7.14%	369	3.03%	7,719	63.32%	12,191
Sublette	2,899	81.80%	341	9.62%	181	5.11%	123	3.47%	2,558	72.18%	3,544
Sweetwater	8,827	74.07%	1,871	15.70%	688	5.77%	531	4.46%	6,956	58.37%	11,917
Teton	4,943	48.72%	4,926	48.55%	51	0.50%	226	2.23%	17	0.17%	10,146
Uinta	5,224	79.20%	754	11.43%	349	5.29%	269	4.08%	4,470	67.77%	6,596
Washakie	2,466	80.99%	267	8.77%	171	5.62%	141	4.63%	2,199	72.22%	3,045
Weston	2,033	74.33%	178	6.51%	355	12.98%	169	6.18%	1,678	61.35%	2,735

Counties that flipped from Democratic to Republican

- Albany (largest city: Laramie)
- Teton (largest city: Jackson)

== See also ==
- 2022 Wyoming elections
