= 1st Wyoming Territorial Legislature =

First meeting of the Wyoming Legislature, 1869

2nd	→
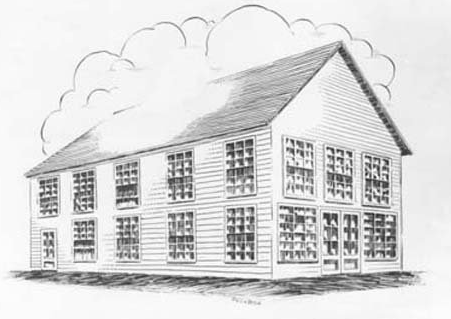
- The Thomas McLeland Building where the Council met on the second floor

Overview
- Legislative body: Wyoming Legislature
- Jurisdiction: Wyoming Territory, United States
- Meeting place: Thomas McLeland Building; Arcade Building
- Term: 1869–1871

Wyoming Council
- Members: 9 Senators
- President of the Council: William H. Bright
- Party control: Democratic

Wyoming House of Representatives
- Members: 13 Representatives (Note: The Territorial House of Representatives was given thirteen members and thirteen were elected in the 1869 elections, but Representative J. M. Freeman did not arrive in the legislature during the session.)
- Speaker of the House: S. M. Curran
- Party control: Democratic

The 1st Wyoming Territorial Legislature was a meeting of the Wyoming Legislature that lasted from October 12 to December 10, 1869. This was the first meeting of the territorial legislature following the creation of the Wyoming Territory by the United States Congress.

== History ==
=== Creation ===
On July 25, 1868, the United States Congress approved the Wyoming Organic Act which created the Wyoming Territory with land from the Dakota, Utah, and Idaho territories. At the time of the territory's formation there were four counties; Albany, Carbon, Carter, and Laramie counties. On September 2, 1869, the first legislature elections were held where the Democratic Party won all of the seats in the Council and House of Representatives.

=== Formation ===
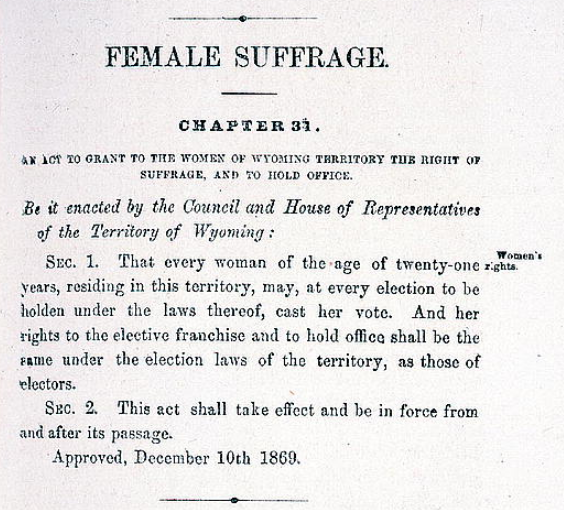
The legislation passed by the Wyoming Territorial Legislature giving women the right to vote.

The first session of the Wyoming territorial legislature occurred from October 12, to December 10, 1869. The upper house Council met in the Thomas McLeland Building and the House of Representatives met in the Arcade Building in Cheyenne, Wyoming. On October 12, John H. Howe, Chief Justice of the Wyoming Supreme Court, inaugurated the twenty-one members of the territorial legislature.

William H. Bright was selected to serve as the President of the Council and S. M. Curran was selected to serve as the Speaker of the House of Representatives. The Council convened with two members missing, W. S. Rockwell and George Wilson Jr., who would later arrive on October 15 and October 27. The House of Representatives convened with five members missing, with four of them arriving by November 23, but Representative J. M. Freeman never arrived.

=== Legislation ===
During the legislative session legislation giving women the right to vote was introduced by William Bright in the council. On December 6, 1869, Council voted seven to two in favor and the House of Representatives voted seven to four in favor. On December 10, Governor John Allen Campbell signed the legislation into law. Amalia Post, a leader in the woman suffrage movement, was largely instrumental in having the franchise granted women in Wyoming Territory by the 1st Wyoming Territorial Legislature.

The legislature passed legislation renaming Carter County to Sweetwater and created Uinta County.

== Membership ==
=== Council ===
Affiliation	Party (Shading indicates majority caucus)		Total	
Affiliation	Democratic	Republican	Total	Vacant
Beginning of 1st Legislature	9	0	9	0
Latest voting share	100%	0%		

=== Members of the Wyoming Council ===
Senator	Party	Counties represented
James W. Brady	Democratic	Albany
William H. Bright	Democratic	Carter
Frederick Laycock	Democratic	Albany
T. D. Murrin	Democratic	Laramie
T. W. Poole	Democratic	Laramie
W. S. Rockwell	Democratic	Carter
George Wardman	Democratic	Carter
J. R. Whitehead	Democratic	Laramie
George Wilson	Democratic	Carbon

=== House of Representatives ===
Affiliation	Party (Shading indicates majority caucus)		Total	
Affiliation	Democratic	Republican	Total	Vacant
Beginning of 1st Legislature	12	0	13 (Note: The Territorial House of Representatives was given thirteen members and thirteen were elected in the 1869 elections, but Representative J. M. Freeman did not arrive in the legislature during the session.)	1
Latest voting share	100%	0%		

=== Members of the Wyoming House of Representatives ===
Representative	Party	Counties represented
J. C. Abney	Democratic	Laramie
S. M. Curran	Democratic	Carbon
J. N. Douglas	Democratic	Albany
J. M. Freeman	Democratic	
Herman Haas	Democratic	
William Herrick	Democratic	Albany
John Holbrook	Democratic	
James Menafee	Democratic	Carter
Louis Miller	Democratic	Albany
Howard Sebree	Democratic	
Benjamin Sheeks	Democratic	Carter
J. C. Strong	Democratic	
Posey S. Wilson	Democratic	Laramie
