= John W. Meldrum =

American politician (1843–1936)

Judge John W. Meldrum
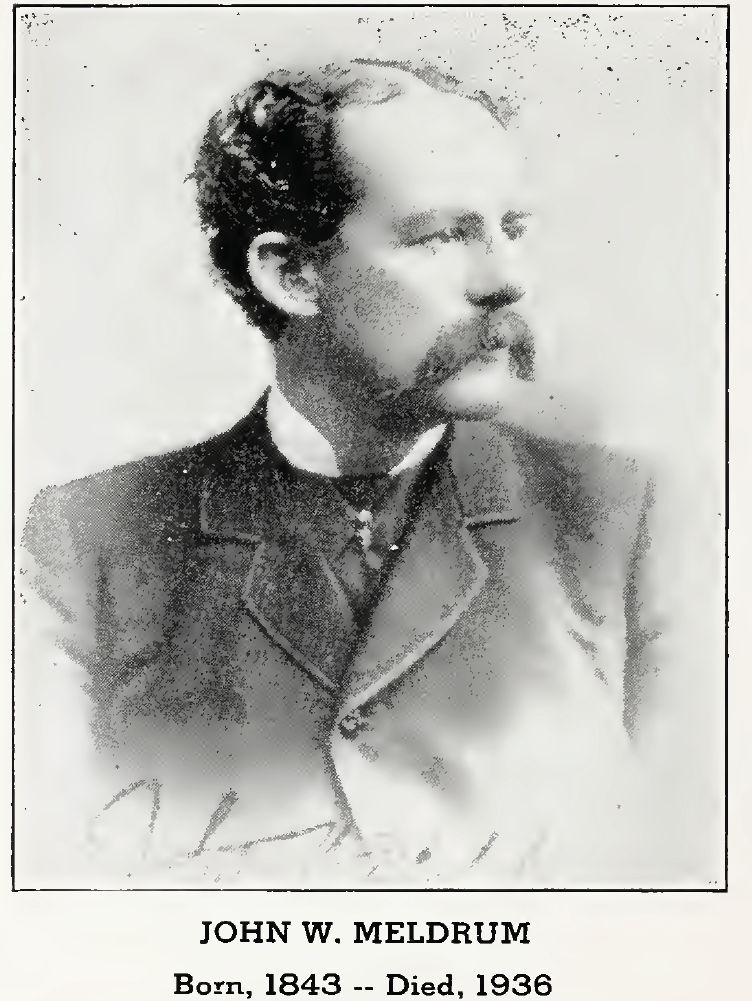

U.S. Commissioner, Yellowstone National Park
- In office June 20, 1894 – July 2, 1935
- Appointed by: Judge John Alden Riner

Personal details
- Born: September 17, 1843 Caledonia, New York
- Died: February 27, 1936 (aged 92) Denver, Colorado
- Nickname: Grand Old Man of Yellowstone

Judge John W. Meldrum (September 17, 1843 – February 27, 1936) was a carpenter, a Wyoming politician and the first U.S. Commissioner in Yellowstone National Park, a position he held for 41 years (1894–1935).

== Early life ==
John Meldrum was born in Caledonia, New York in 1843. He trained as a wagonmaker at an early age. He served with the 14th New York Heavy Artillery until September 1864 during the Civil War. Shortly after the end of the war, he was in Arkansas working as a wagonmaker. In the spring of 1867 he moved to Cheyenne, Wyoming Territory and then to Fort Collins, Colorado where he worked on a ranch for two years. In 1870, Meldrum moved to Laramie, Wyoming to open a meat market. For the next few years he work for various interests, including as a wagon maker for the Union Pacific Railroad. It was during this time that Meldrum received his first political appointment as clerk of the district court. He also served two terms as a county commissioner, a term as chairman of the county commission and a term on the territorial council.

== Wyoming politics ==
In 1882, John W. Meldrum was nominated by Wyoming Republicans to be their delegate to Congress although he was defeated. In 1884 he became a delegate from Wyoming at the national Republican convention. After convention, he was appointed Surveyor General of Wyoming Territory by President Chester A. Arthur, a position he held until November 1885. In May, 1889 President Benjamin Harrison appointed Meldrum as the Secretary of State for the Territory of Wyoming. He held that position until January 1891. Wyoming was granted statehood in July 1890. Elections for the new state government were held in September 1890. During those elections, Amos W. Barber was elected Secretary of State and Francis E. Warren the first Governor of Wyoming. Warren had already served two terms as Governor of the Territory of Wyoming.

Warren would not serve long as Wyoming's first governor as the newly elected legislature would elect him as Wyoming's first Senator. That move elevated Amos Barber to the position of governor while still retaining the Secretary of State position. Because Barber could not run both the Governor's and Secretary's offices, he appointed Meldrum as the Chief Clerk to the Secretary of State with full authority to run the Secretary's office.

Although a court clerk for many years, Meldrum was not formally trained in the law, but did read the law under the tutelage of the many judges he served. This informal training helped him receive the appointment as U.S. Commissioner to Yellowstone.

== U.S. Commissioner in Yellowstone ==
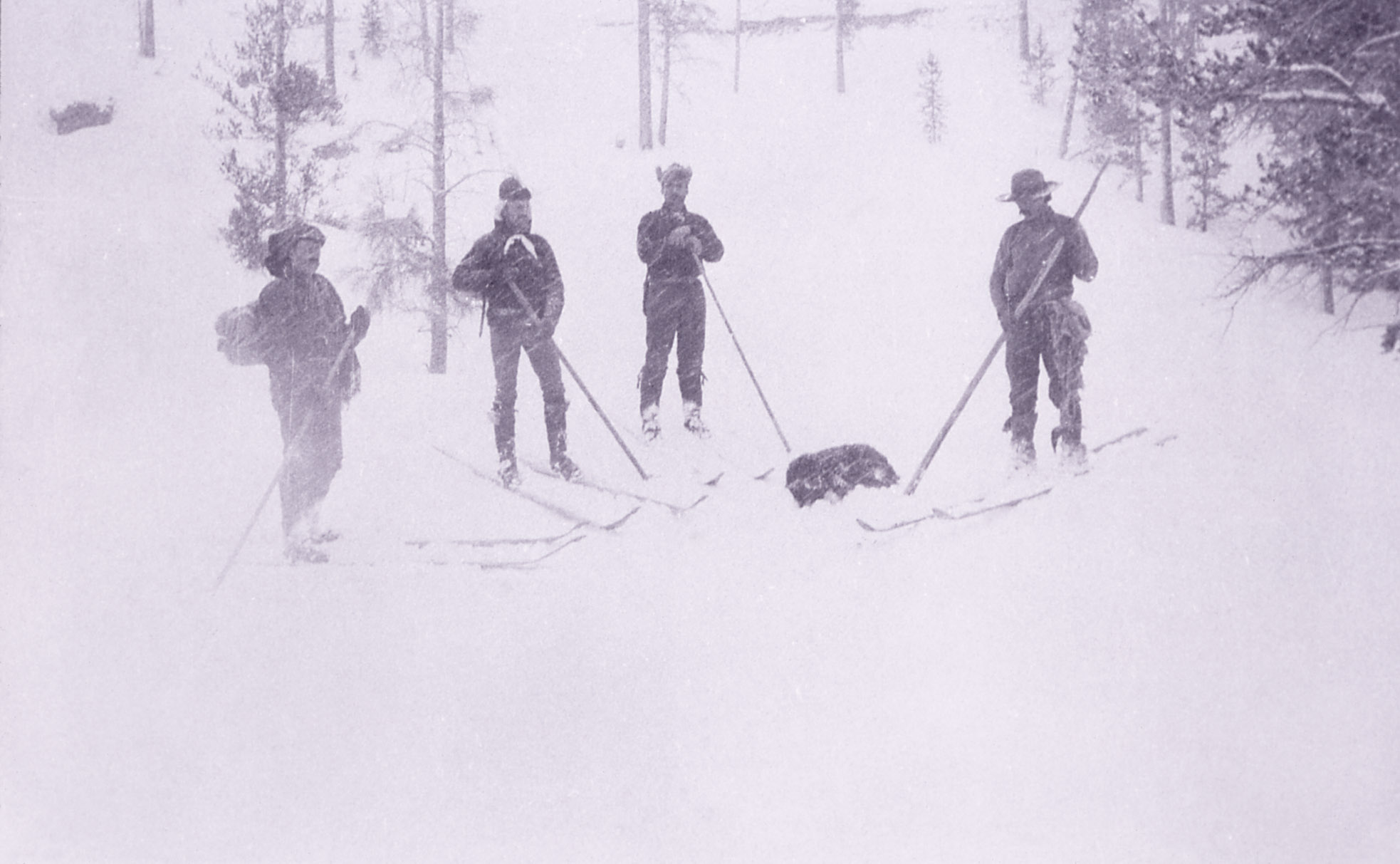
Capture of poacher Ed Howell, March 1894

In March 1894, Edgar Howell, a poacher from Cooke City, Montana was captured by Captain G. L. Scott, U.S. Army, and a patrol of soldiers for killing Bison in the Pelican Valley section of the park. Unfortunately, there were no laws that would allow prosecution of Howell and he could only be temporarily detained and removed from the park. Shortly after his capture, Frank Jay Haynes park photographer, Emerson Hough noted western author, and Billy Hofer, a noted backcountry guide, encountered Scott and Howell as Howell was being escorted back to Fort Yellowstone. Haines captured the encounter on film and Hough telegraphed a story back to his publisher: Forest and Stream. The story prompted George Bird Grinnell, editor of Forest and Stream to lobby congress for a law to allow prosecution of crimes in Yellowstone. The result was the Lacey Act of 1894. Edgar Howell would later play a pivotable role in one of Judge Meldrum's most famous cases.

The passage of the Lacey Act of 1894 or An Act To protect the birds and animals in Yellowstone National Park, and to punish crimes in said park, and for other such purposes gave Yellowstone the status of a United States Judicial District of Wyoming thus creating the need for a U.S. Commissioner. The Act contained this provision:

Sec. 5 That the United States circuit court in said district shall appoint a commissioner, who shall reside in the park, who shall have jurisdiction to hear and act upon all complaints made, of any and all violations of the law, or of the rules and regulations made the Secretary of the Interior for the government of the park, and for the protection of the animals, birds, and fish and objects of interest therein, and for other purposes authorized by this Act.

— U.S. Statutes at Large Vol 23, Part 73, May 1894

=== The appointment ===
As a long standing member of the Republican party in Wyoming, Meldrum had become closely acquainted with many prominent Wyoming politicians. One of those was Wyoming Territorial Governor John Wesley Hoyt (1878–1882). Hoyt visited Yellowstone on an official, month-long inspection tour in 1881. When Hoyt returned, Meldrum learned from Hoyt's first-hand accounts of the wonders of the park. It sparked a desire on his part to visit the park someday.

Shortly after the passage of the act, Meldrum learned that Judge John Alden Riner of the United States District Court for the District of Wyoming would be the one to appoint the Commissioner. Meldrum approached Riner, whom he had worked with for many years, and asked for the appointment.

Judge, you know my capabilities. I would like to go to Yellowstone Park.

— John W. Meldrum, 1894

Riner appointed John W. Meldrum as the first U.S. Commissioner for Yellowstone National Park, effective June 20, 1884.

=== The Commissioner's office and residence ===
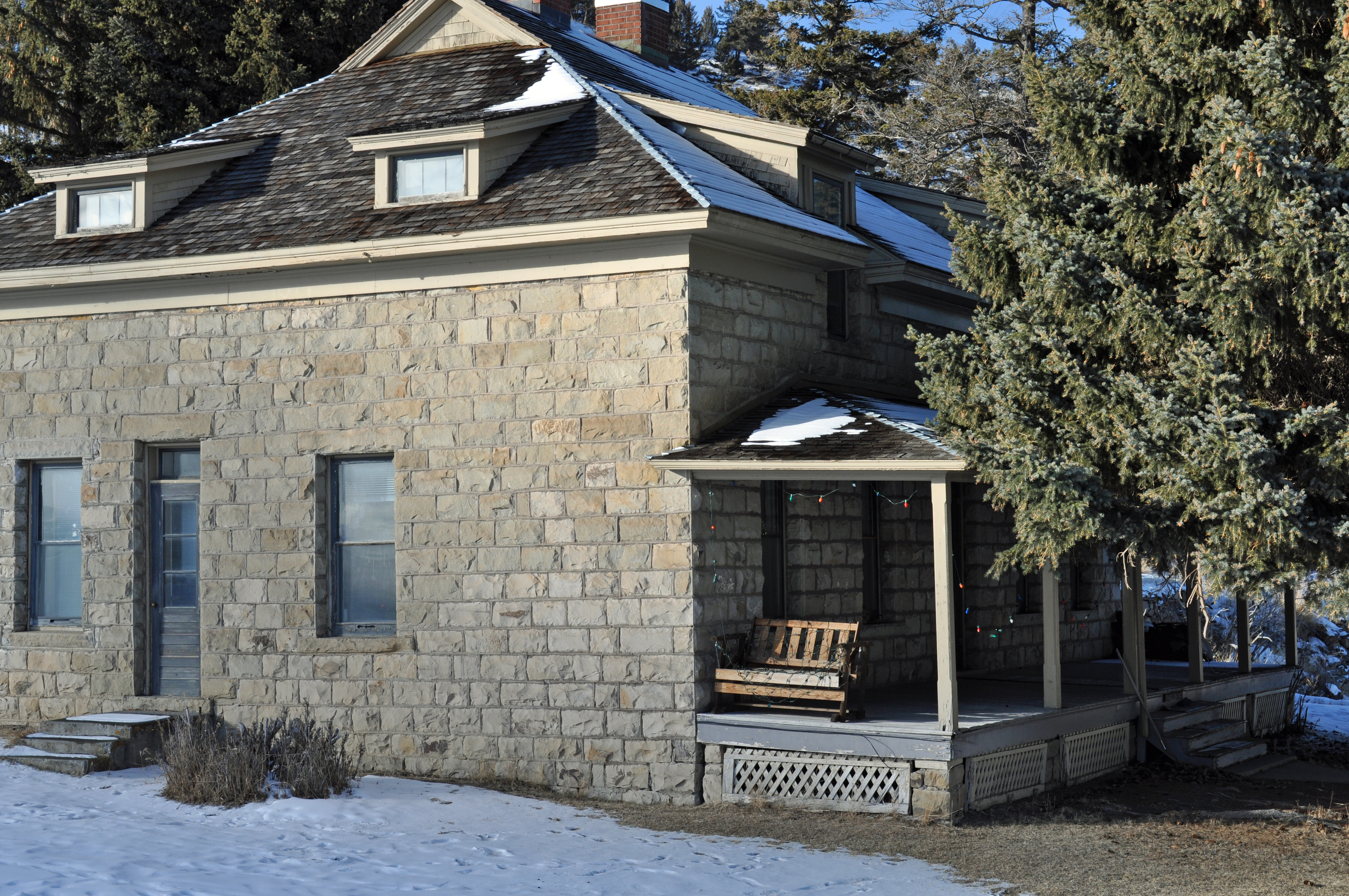
U.S. Commissioner's Office, 2009 (Now a private residence)

John W. Meldrum did not travel to Yellowstone until July 1894 making his way via train, coach, wagon and horseback from Laramie via Salt Lake City, Henry's Lake and the Madison River. His first night in the park was spent at the Fountain Hotel near the Fountain Paint Pots area of the Lower Geyser Basin. There he met Captain George S. Anderson, U.S. Army, the current park superintendent. Meldrum traveled to Mammoth Hot Springs the next day and took up residence and an office in the Mammoth Hot Springs Hotel. One of Meldrum's first duties was to supervise the construction of the Commissioner's building, funded by the Lacey Act and designed by a local soldier. The Fort Yellowstone Historic District application describes the building, which still stands today:

The first stone building within the district was completed in that year [1894]. The U.S. Commissioner's Jail and Office and U.S. Marshal's Residence (Building 49), which stood alone west of the parade ground, was a one-and-a-half-story rock-faced sandstone dwelling with gable-on-hip roof with through-the-cornice dormers and a full-width porch. The building was funded with the passage of the Lacey Act in 1894, which created a means to arrest, try, and punish lawbreakers. The ground floor of the house contained the jail, office, and living quarters. Bedrooms were situated on the second floor. The building was of a restrained and dignified design, qualities which would typify the stone housing built at the fort in future years.

=== Famous cases ===
- The 1897 Canyon holdup

On August 14, 1897 two armed men held up a caravan of four stages and an Army ambulance en route from Canyon to Mammoth. A total of $630 was stolen from park visitors. The resulting case: United States vs. Gus Smitzer, alias Little Gus; and George Reeb, alias Morphine Charley was the result of two weeks of interesting detective work by the U.S. Army, army scouts and Edgar Howell, the infamous poacher. Witness accounts were insufficient to identify and arrest the robbers so the Army was engaged find whatever evidence could be found near the crime. They located a variety of circumstantial evidence in a recently abandoned campsite just north of Grebe Lake that tied the robbers to the scene. Edgar Howell was engaged to identify and find the robbers upon the advice of Frank Jay Haynes who believed Howell was a good man and knew all the bad guys in Yellowstone. On August 30, 1897, Smitzer and Reeb were arrested and shortly thereafter Meldrum heard the evidence and bound them over for trial in the Federal court in Cheyenne, Wyoming. In May 1898 they were convicted and sentenced to three years in prison. In recognition of Edgar Howell's contribution to the case, Meldrum awarded him $150 of the $750 reward put up by the Army and park transportation company

- The Case of William Binkley

=== Interesting relations ===
While serving in Yellowstone, Meldrum's niece, Miss Louise Chase from New York visited him in the park in the early 1900s. There she met Robert Reamer the Old Faithful Inn architect whom she later married in 1911.

== Death ==
John Meldrum was in poor health when he resigned his post at Yellowstone in 1935. In October 1935 he left the park to visit relatives in Wyoming and Denver, CO. He arrived in Denver in January 1936 to spend time with his niece, Miss Susie A. Meldrum. On February 24, 1936 he learned of the death of Yellowstone superintendent and personal friend, Roger W. Toll, in a New Mexico traffic accident. He did not take the news well, became very depressed and died the morning of February 27, 1936. John W. Meldrum was cremated at Rogers Mortuary, Denver, Colorado on February 29, 1936. His funeral was held at St. Johns Episcopal Cathedral. His pallbearers, each in uniform, all represented the National Park Service—Thomas J. Allen, Superintendent of Hot Springs National Park; El T. Scoyen, Superintendent of Glacier National Park; J. W. Emmert, Assistant Superintendent, Yellowstone National Park; Herbert Maier, Regional State Park officer; Ray C. Baxter, United States Commissioner, Rocky Mountain National Park; and Walter Finn, Park Ranger, Rocky Mountain National Park

== Memorials ==
In 1962 the National Park Service named a peak located in the northwest corner of the park Meldrum Mountain 45°02′51″N 111°00′57″W in his honor.
