= 1918 United States Senate election in Wyoming =

- November 5, 1918
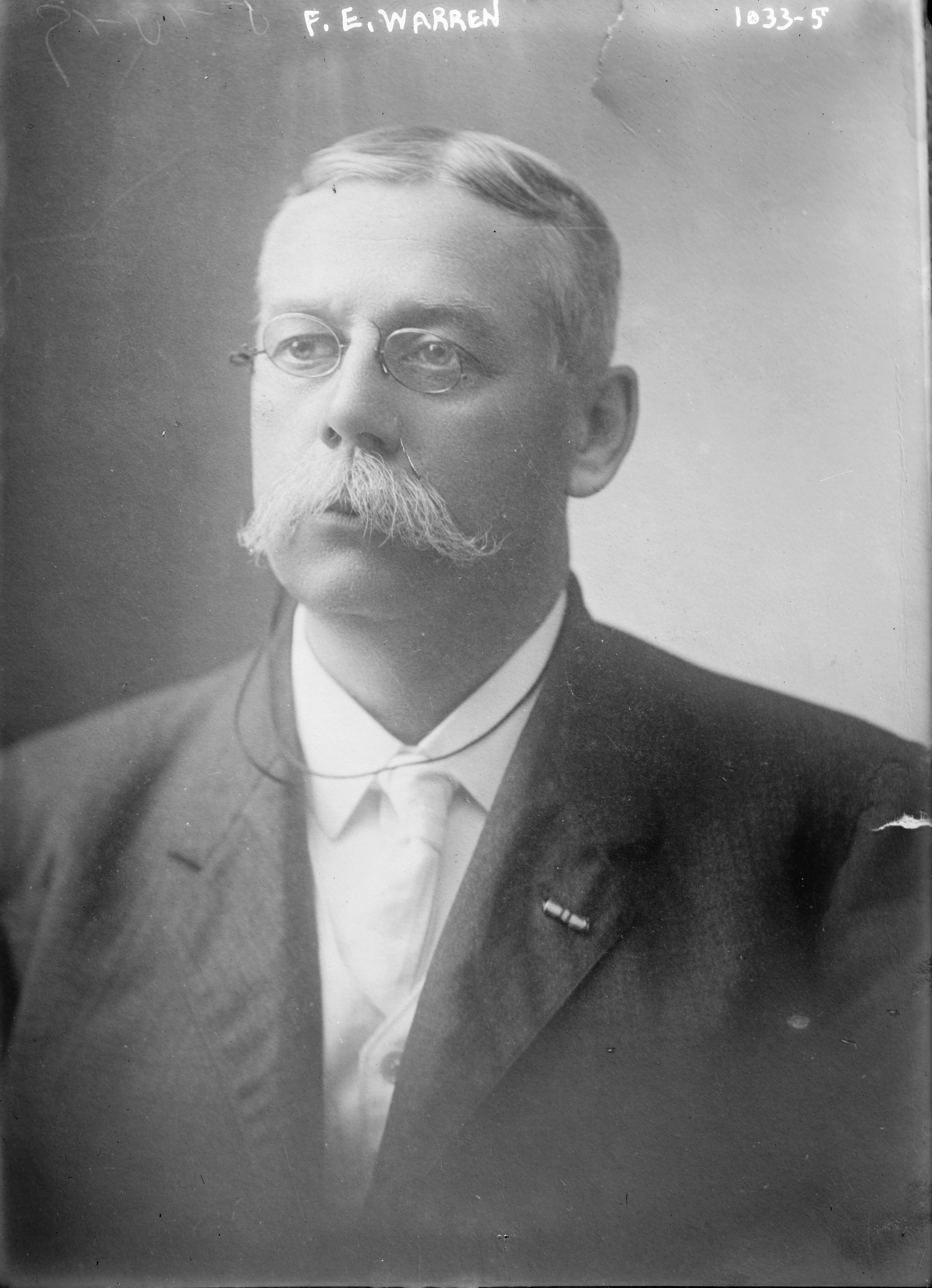

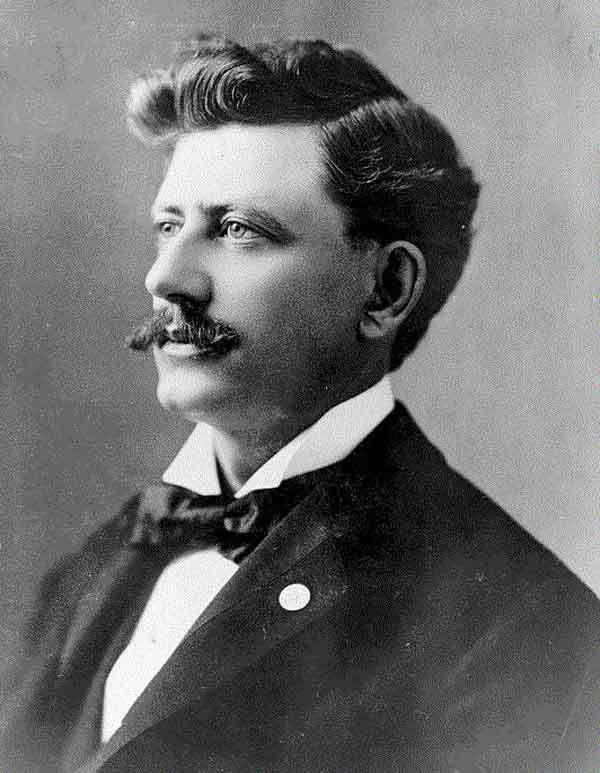
Nominee	Francis E. Warren	John E. Osborne
Party	Republican	Democratic
Popular vote	23,975	17,528
Percentage	57.77%	42.23%
- County results Warren: 50–60% 60–70% Osborne: 50–60%
U.S. senator before election
Francis E. Warren
Republican
Elected U.S. Senator
Francis E. Warren
Republican

The 1918 United States Senate election in Wyoming took place on November 5, 1918. Incumbent Republican Senator Francis E. Warren ran for re-election to his fifth consecutive term in the Senate, in his first popular election. He was opposed by former Governor John E. Osborne, the Democratic nominee, who had until recently served as the U.S. Assistant Secretary of State. Owing in part to Warren's long record of service, and also to the strong Republican performance throughout the country in the 1918 elections, Warren defeated Osborne by a wide margin.

== Democratic primary ==
=== Candidates ===
- John E. Osborne, former Governor of Wyoming, former U.S. Assistant Secretary of State

=== Results ===
Democratic primary
Party	Candidate	Votes	%
Democratic	John E. Osborne	4,186	100.00%
Total votes		4,186	100.00%

== Republican primary ==
=== Candidates ===
- Francis E. Warren, incumbent U.S. Senator

=== Results ===
Republican primary
Party	Candidate	Votes	%
Republican	Francis E. Warren (inc.)	12,709	100.00%
Total votes		12,709	100.00%

== General election ==
=== Results ===
1918 United States Senate election in Wyoming
Party	Candidate	Votes	%
Republican	Francis E. Warren (inc.)	23,975	57.77%
Democratic	John E. Osborne	17,528	42.23%
Total votes		41,503	100.00%
Republican hold			
