= George W. Baxter =

American politician (1855–1929)

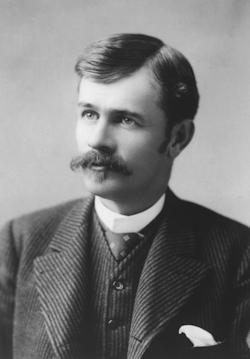

7th Governor of Wyoming Territory
- In office November 11, 1886 – December 20, 1886
- Preceded by: Francis E. Warren
- Succeeded by: Elliot S. N. Morgan

Personal details
- Born: January 7, 1855 Hendersonville, North Carolina, U.S.
- Died: December 18, 1929 (aged 74) New York City, New York, U.S.
- Party: Democratic

George White Baxter (January 7, 1855 – December 18, 1929) was an American politician who served as territorial governor of Wyoming from November 11, 1886 – December 20, 1886.

== Early years ==
Baxter was born in Hendersonville, North Carolina, on January 7, 1855, the son of Judge John Baxter and Orra Alexander Baxter. When he was two years old, Baxter's family moved to Knoxville, Tennessee, where he lived much of his life.

Baxter attended university in Knoxville but later continued his education at the United States Military Academy at West Point. He left Knoxville and enrolled at West Point in 1873 and graduated in 1877. After graduating he was commissioned a second lieutenant and he served in the Third United States Cavalry for three years. Baxter arrived in Wyoming in 1881 after leaving the Army.

== Political career ==
On November 11, 1886 Baxter was appointed the governor of the then-U.S. territory of Wyoming by President Grover Cleveland. He replaced Francis E. Warren, who faced scrutiny for his business dealings. Baxter's time as governor was short-lived, however; he served in the position until only December 20, 1886. He resigned the office and was replaced, temporarily by the secretary of the territory, Elliot S.N. Morgan.

Baxter returned to politics in 1889, serving as a delegate to the Wyoming Constitutional Convention. Later, in 1890, he made an unsuccessful run for governor of Wyoming. He returned to Knoxville in 1892 and entered private business.

Baxter was married to Margaret White McGhee, daughter of Knoxville businessman Charles McClung McGhee.

== Death ==
Baxter died in New York City in 1929 at age 74.

Party political offices
| First | Democratic nominee for Governor of Wyoming; 1890 | Succeeded by John Eugene Osborne |
