= 1890 Wyoming gubernatorial election =

- September 11, 1890
- Turnout: 26.41% of Total Population
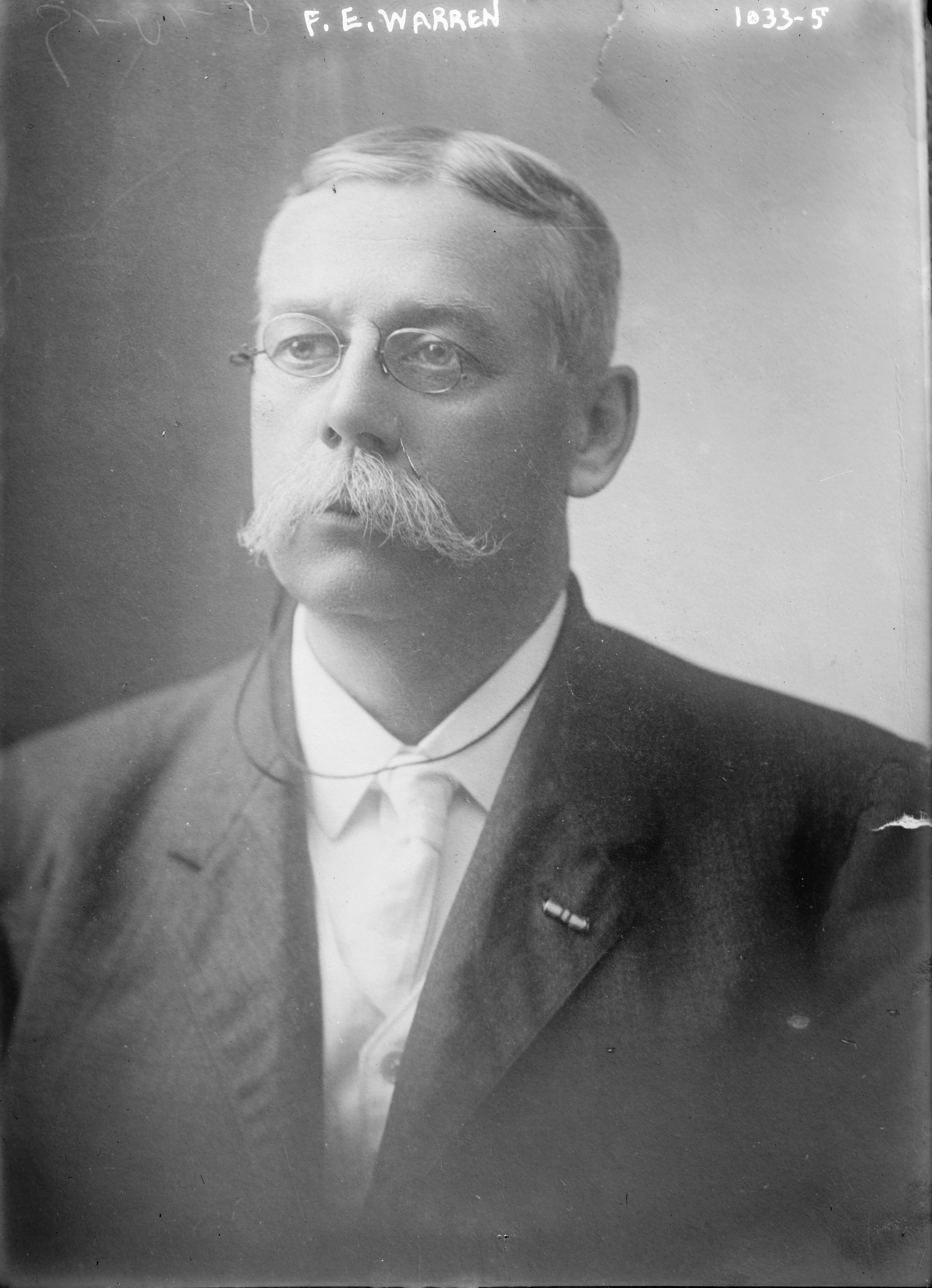

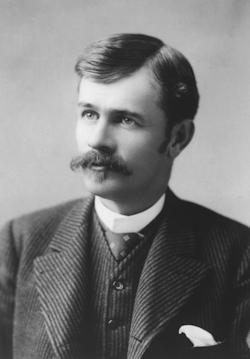
Nominee	Francis E. Warren	George W. Baxter
Party	Republican	Democratic
Popular vote	8,879	7,153
Percentage	55.38%	44.62%
- County results Warren: 50–60% 60–70% No Data/Vote
Governor before election
Francis E. Warren
Republican
Elected Governor
Francis E. Warren
Republican

The 1890 Wyoming gubernatorial election was held on September 11, 1890, as the first gubernatorial election for the newly admitted state of Wyoming. Incumbent Territorial Governor Francis E. Warren ran for re-election as the Republican nominee against former Territorial Governor George W. Baxter, the Democratic nominee. Warren defeated Baxter by a decisive margin and became the first popularly elected Governor of Wyoming.

However, shortly after Warren's term began as governor, he was elected to the U.S. Senate by the newly constituted state legislature, and he resigned on November 24, 1890. Accordingly, Secretary of State Amos W. Barber became governor, and a special gubernatorial election was held in 1892.

== Party conventions ==
Prior to the adoption of Wyoming's primary law in 1911, the political parties nominated their candidates for office by convention. Prior to the start of the Republican convention, incumbent Territorial Governor Francis E. Warren was seen as the likeliest, and the strongest, candidate. The Republican Party ultimately nominated Warren, though his poor health at the time raised the possibility that he might need to be replaced on the ticket.

Prior to the Democratic convention, speculation swirled around three names: former Territorial Governor George W. Baxter; banker T. B. Hicks; and Evanston businessman A. C. Beckwith. Baxter was ultimately nominated by the Democratic convention by acclamation, queueing up a contest between two different territorial governors.

== General election ==
=== Results ===
1890 Wyoming gubernatorial election
Party	Candidate	Votes	%
Republican	Francis E. Warren (inc.)	8,879	55.38%
Democratic	George W. Baxter	7,153	44.62%
Majority		1,726	10.77%
Total votes		16,032	100.00%
Republican hold			
