= 2nd Wyoming Territorial Legislature =

Meeting of the Wyoming Legislature

←	1st	3rd	→
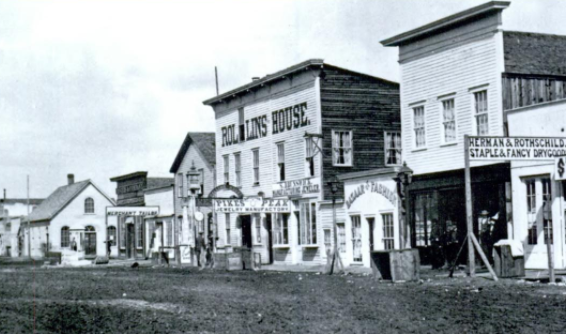
- The Rollins House where the Council and House of Representatives convened

Overview
- Legislative body: Wyoming Legislature
- Jurisdiction: Wyoming Territory, United States
- Meeting place: Rollins House
- Term: 1871–1873

Wyoming Council
- Members: 9 Senators
- President of the Council: Stephen Friel Nuckolls
- Party control: Democratic

Wyoming House of Representatives
- Members: 13 Representatives
- Speaker of the House: Ben Sheeks
- Party control: Democratic

The 2nd Wyoming Territorial Legislature was a former meeting of the Wyoming Legislature that lasted from November 7, to December 16, 1871. During this session, an attempt was made to repeal the legislation passed in 1869, that had given women the right to vote, but it failed.

== History ==
On November 7, 1871, Stephen Friel Nuckolls was selected to serve as President of the Council and Ben Sheeks was selected to serve as Speaker of the House of Representatives.

In November, legislation was proposed that would repeal the legislation giving women the right to vote that was passed in 1869. The House of Representatives voted nine to three in favor of the legislation, with all nine Democratic members voting in favor and three Republican members voting against. The legislation later passed the Council with five to four voting in favor. However, the legislation was vetoed by Governor John Allen Campbell. The House of Representatives voted in favor of overturning his veto, but the Council did not.

On December 18, the Council approved Governor Campbell's nominations of J. H. Hayward for Auditor and J. W. Donnan for Treasurer.

== Membership ==
=== Council ===
Affiliation	Party (Shading indicates majority caucus)			Total	
Affiliation	Democratic	Republican	Populist	Total	Vacant
Beginning of 2nd Legislature	5	3	1	9	0
Latest voting share	55.56%	33.33%	11.11%		

=== House of Representatives ===
Affiliation	Party (Shading indicates majority caucus)			Total	
Affiliation	Democratic	Republican	Populist	Total	Vacant
Beginning of 2nd Legislature	9	4	0	13	0
Latest voting share	69.23%	30.77%	0.00%		
