= John Eugene Osborne =

American physician and politician

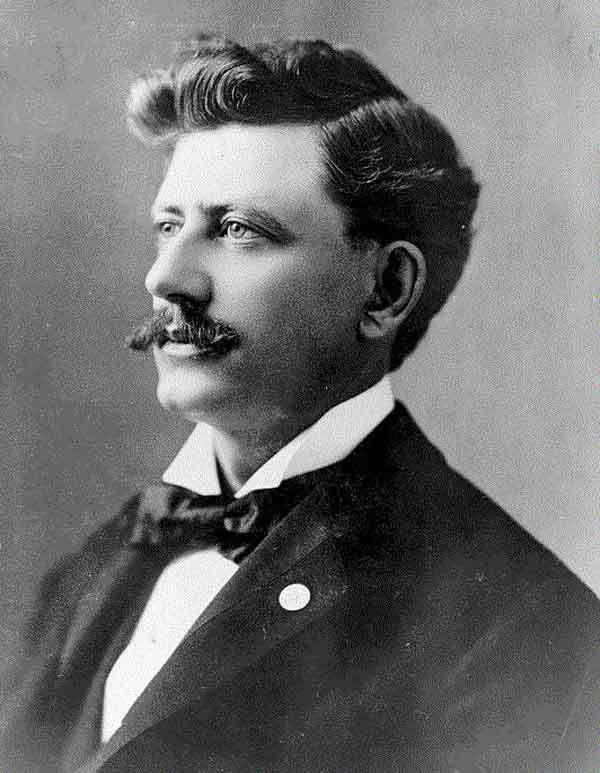

29th United States Assistant Secretary of State
- In office April 21, 1913 – December 14, 1916
- President: Woodrow Wilson
- Preceded by: Huntington Wilson
- Succeeded by: William Phillips

Member of the U.S. House of Representatives from Wyoming's at-large district
- In office March 4, 1897 – March 3, 1899
- Preceded by: Frank W. Mondell
- Succeeded by: Frank W. Mondell

3rd Governor of Wyoming
- In office January 2, 1893 – January 7, 1895
- Preceded by: Amos W. Barber
- Succeeded by: William A. Richards

Personal details
- Born: June 19, 1858 Westport, New York, U.S.
- Died: April 24, 1943 (aged 84) Rawlins, Wyoming, U.S.
- Resting place: Cedar Hill Cemetery, Princeton, Kentucky, U.S.
- Party: Democratic
- Spouse: Selina Smith
- Children: Jean Curtis Osborne
- Parents: John C. Osborne (father); Mary E. Rail (mother)
- Education: University of Vermont College of Medicine

John Eugene Osborne (June 19, 1858 – April 24, 1943) was an American physician, farmer, banker, and politician who served as the third governor of Wyoming and United States representative as a member of the Democratic Party.

== Early life ==
John Eugene Osborne was born on June 19, 1858, although his passport stated that he was born on June 19, 1860, in Westport, New York, to John C. Osborne and Mary E. Rail. In 1874 Osborne moved to Burlington, Vermont, where he worked at a drug store and studied medicine at the University of Vermont College of Medicine where he graduated in 1880. Later that year he moved to Rawlins in the Wyoming Territory where he established a drug store. In 1881 he was hired as a surgeon by the Union Pacific Railroad.

=== Big Nose George Parrott ===
Following the botched hanging and subsequent execution of George Parrott, also known as Big Nose George, in 1881,

His remains then embarked on a strange journey, with part of his skin being made into shoes by John Eugene Osborne, the doctor who examined him after his death. Osborne wore the footwear to his inaugural ball when he became governor in 1892. Osborne also gave part of George's skull to medical assistant Lillian Heath, who used the skull as a doorstop for many years.

— By Christina Schmidt, "Famous James brother made camp in Big Horn", Sheridan Press

Lillian Heath was 16 when she received the skull cap of Big Nose George, and went on to become the first female physician in Wyoming.

== Career ==
=== Early politics ===
In 1883, Osborne was elected to Wyoming's House of the Territorial Assembly, but resigned in 1885, when he left the Territory for a brief period. In 1888, he was appointed chairman of the Penitentiary Building Commission and also elected mayor of Rawlins. During the 1880s, Osborne was a physician and chemist in Rawlins, and operated a farm, at one point being the largest individual sheep owner in Wyoming. After the lynching of Big Nose George Parrott, Osborne helped conduct the autopsy, and had Parrot's skin tanned and made into a pair of shoes he later allegedly wore at his inauguration as governor.

=== Governor and congressman ===
Osborne was an alternate delegate to the Democratic National Convention in 1892. In July 1892, Osborne was given the Democratic nomination for governor at the state convention on the 37th ballot although he had removed his name from consideration before being convinced to put it back up. In the general election he defeated Edward Ivinson with 9,290 votes to 7,509 votes.

On January 2, 1893, Osborne was inaugurated, wearing the shoes he had made from Big Nose George's skin, although he had attempted to take office earlier on December 2, 1892, which was ruled as invalid and premature by the Wyoming Supreme Court on January 17. He was unable to attend Grover Cleveland's presidential inauguration as he was afraid that Secretary of State Amos W. Barber would appoint a Republican during the time that he would server as acting governor in Osborne's absence. During his tenure he fought with the state legislature which was divided with 22 Republicans, 21 Democrats, and 5 Populists. He completed his term on January 7, 1895, having declined renomination.

From March 4, 1897 until March 3, 1899, he served in the 55th United States Congress as the U.S. representative from Wyoming, but again declined renomination when his term expired.

== Later life ==
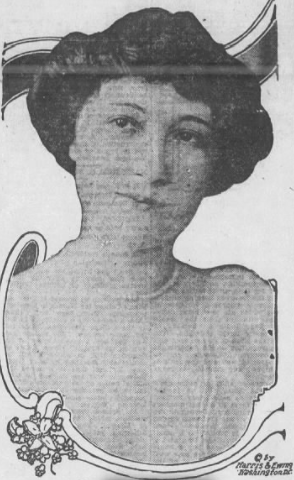
Selina Smith

Osborne was a free silver supporter and during the 1896, 1900, and 1908 presidential elections he supported William Jennings Bryan. In 1896 he served as chairman of the Wyoming delegation to the Democratic National Convention, in 1898 he served as vice chairman of the Democratic National Committee, was made a member of the national committee in 1900, and served as the vice chairman of the finance committee in 1908. During the 1904 presidential election Bryan suggested that somebody like Osborne from the western United States should run for the Democratic nomination, but Osborne chose not to run.

On April 28, 1903, Governor DeForest Richards died in office shortly after winning reelection in 1902 resulting in a special election. Osborne won the Democratic nomination by acclamation, but was defeated in a landslide in the special election by Bryant Butler Brooks.

On November 2, 1907, he married Selina Smith of Princeton, Kentucky, after they met on the island of Madeira when Selina, then named Jean Curtis Smith, was on a round-the-world trip with her sister, Kate, and brother-in-law. They became engaged for marriage upon returning to the United States two months later. Their honeymoon was interrupted "when his efforts to secure the 1908 Democratic National Convention for the West met with success and they were obliged to hurry to [Denver," where it was to be held. Mrs. Osborne was known as the "official hostess" for the convention.

In 1910, he served as chairman of the Wyoming Democratic Party. Osborne was appointed Assistant Secretary of State by President Woodrow Wilson and served in his administration from April 21, 1913, until December 14, 1916. He was also chairman of the board of the Rawlins National Bank, and engaged in stock raising. In 1913, he suggested that the remains of Christopher Columbus should be placed on a battleship and travel through the Panama Canal as a part of its opening ceremony. During the 1936 presidential election he was selected as one of the three Democratic presidential electors for Wyoming and vote for Franklin D. Roosevelt and John Nance Garner when the electoral college convened.

Osborne was a Freemason and a member of the York Rite. On March 2, 1942, his wife died in Louisville, Kentucky. On April 24, 1943, Osborne died in Rawlins, Wyoming, at age 84 after suffering a heart attack earlier in the week. He was interred at the Smith family plot at Cedar Hill Cemetery in Princeton, Kentucky.

== Electoral history ==
John Eugene Osborne electoral history

1892 Wyoming Gubernatorial special election
Party	Candidate	Votes	%	±%
Democratic	John Eugene Osborne	9,290	53.84%	+9.22%
Republican	Edward Ivinson	7,509	43.52%	−11.86%
Prohibition	William Brown	421	2.44%	+2.44%
Write-in		36	0.21%	+0.21%
Total votes		17,256	100.00%	

1894 Wyoming at-large Congressional District election
Party	Candidate	Votes	%	±%
Democratic	John Eugene Osborne	10,310	49.14%	+16.97%
Republican	Frank Wheeler Mondell	10,044	47.87%	−4.77%
Populist	William Brown	628	2.99%	−12.20%
Total votes		20,982	100.00%	

1894 Wyoming Gubernatorial special election
Party	Candidate	Votes	%	±%
Republican	Bryant Butler Brooks	14,483	57.48%	−0.33%
Democratic	John Eugene Osborne	12,137	39.27%	−0.72%
Socialist	James W. Gates	816	2.64%	+0.44%
Prohibition	George W. Blain	191	0.62%	+0.62%
Total votes		30,909	100.00%	

Party political offices
Preceded by George W. Baxter	Democratic nominee for Governor of Wyoming; 1892	Succeeded by William H. Holliday
Preceded by George T. Beck	Democratic nominee for Governor of Wyoming; 1904	Succeeded by Stephen A. D. Keister
First	Democratic nominee for U.S. Senator from Wyoming (Class 2); 1918	Succeeded by Robert R. Rose
Political offices
Preceded by Amos W. Barber	Governor of Wyoming; January 2, 1893 – January 7, 1895	Succeeded by William A. Richards
Preceded by Huntington Wilson	United States Assistant Secretary of State; April 21, 1913 – December 14, 1915	Succeeded by William Phillips
U.S. House of Representatives
Preceded by Franklin Wheeler Mondell	Member of the U.S. House of Representatives from Wyoming's 1st congressional district March 4, 1897 – March 3, 1899	Succeeded by Franklin Wheeler Mondell
