= Francis E. Warren =

American politician and soldier (1844–1929)

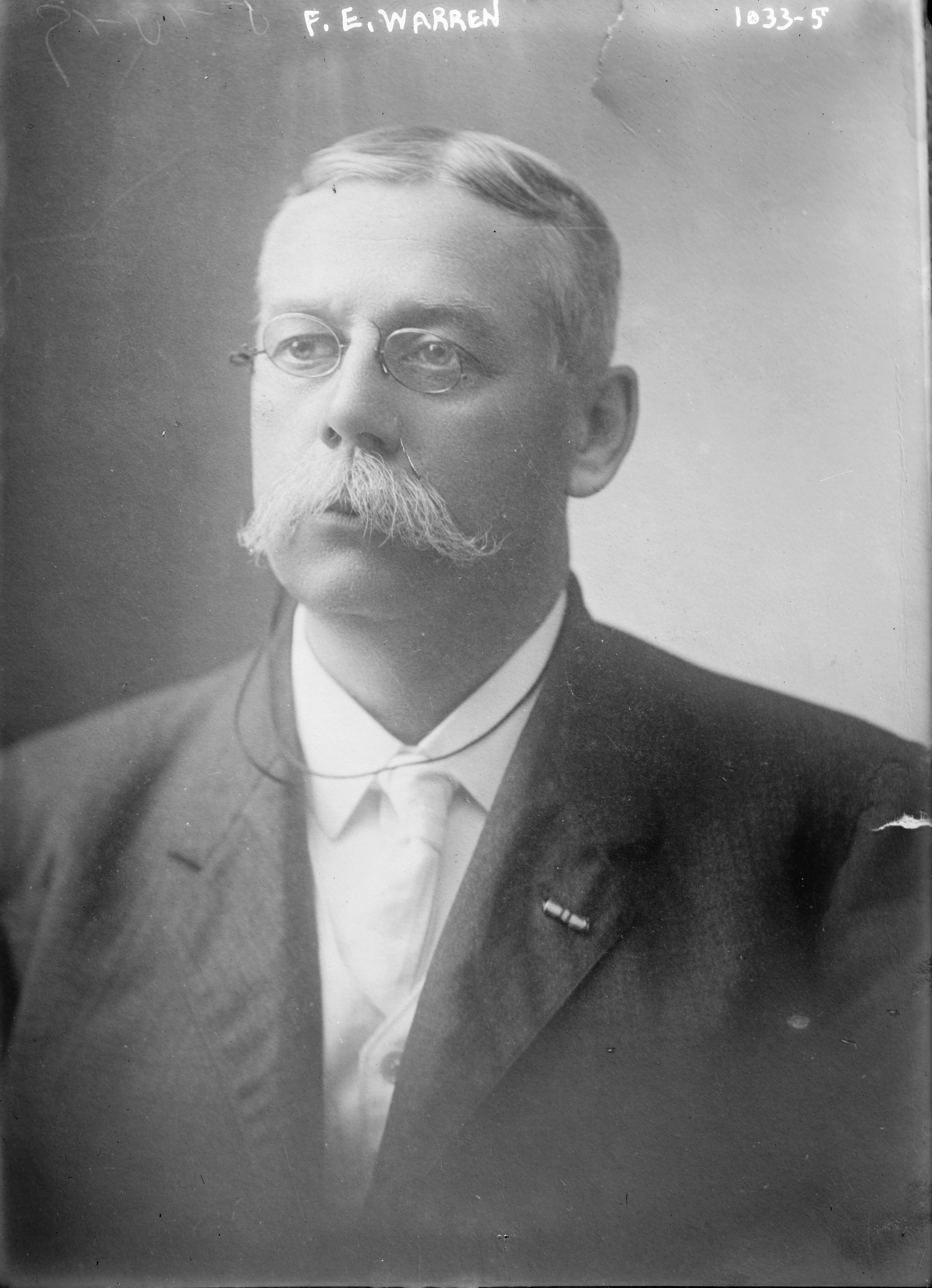
- Warren in 1919

United States Senator from Wyoming
- In office November 24, 1890 – March 3, 1893
- Preceded by: Office established
- Succeeded by: Clarence D. Clark
- In office March 4, 1895 – November 24, 1929
- Preceded by: Joseph M. Carey
- Succeeded by: Patrick J. Sullivan

1st Governor of Wyoming
- In office October 11, 1890 - November 24, 1890
- Preceded by: Himself (as Territorial Governor)
- Succeeded by: Amos W. Barber

6th & 10th Governor of Wyoming Territory
- In office April 9, 1889 – October 11, 1890
- Appointed by: Benjamin Harrison
- Preceded by: Thomas Moonlight
- Succeeded by: Office abolished
- In office February 28, 1885 – November 11, 1886
- Appointed by: Chester Arthur
- Preceded by: Elliot S. N. Morgan
- Succeeded by: George W. Baxter

Personal details
- Born: Francis Emroy Warren; June 20, 1844 Hinsdale, Massachusetts, U.S.
- Died: November 24, 1929 (aged 85) Washington, D.C., U.S.
- Party: Republican
- Spouse(s): Helen M. Smith (m. 1871; died 1902) Clara LeNaron Morgan (m. 1911)
- Profession: Politician, farmer
- Awards: Medal of Honor

Military service
- Allegiance: United States of America; Union
- Branch/service: Union Army; Massachusetts Militia
- Rank: Corporal (U.S.); Captain (Massachusetts)
- Unit: 49th Regiment, Massachusetts Volunteer Infantry
- Battles/wars: American Civil War: Siege of Port Hudson

Francis Emroy Warren (June 20, 1844 – November 24, 1929) was an American politician of the Republican Party who represented Wyoming in the United States Senate and was the first governor of Wyoming. A soldier in the Union Army during the American Civil War, he was the last veteran of that conflict to serve in the U.S. Senate.

== Early life and military service ==
Warren was born on June 20, 1844, in Hinsdale, Berkshire County, Massachusetts, the son of Cynthia Estella (Abbott) and Joseph Spencer Warren. He grew up attending common schools and his local Hinsdale Academy.

During the Civil War, Warren served in the 49th Massachusetts Infantry as a noncommissioned officer. At the age of nineteen at the siege of Port Hudson, Warren received the Medal of Honor for battlefield gallantry. His entire platoon was destroyed by Confederate bombardment, and Warren, taking a serious scalp wound, disabled the artillery. Warren later served as a captain in the Massachusetts Militia.

== Medal of Honor citation ==

Rank and Organization: Corporal, Company C, 49th Massachusetts Infantry.

Place and Date: At Port Hudson, La., May 27, 1863.

Entered Service At: Hinsdale, Mass.

Birth: Hinsdale, Mass.

Date Of Issue: September 30, 1893.

Citation:

Volunteered in response to a call, and took part in the movement that was made upon the enemy's works under a heavy fire therefrom in advance of the general assault.

== Personal life ==
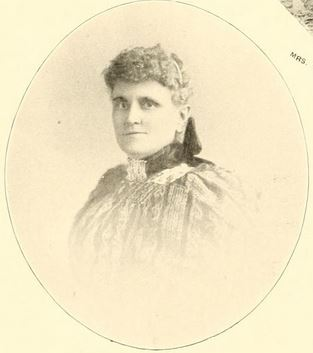
Mrs. Francis E. Warren

Francis E. Warren married Helen Smith, a woman from Massachusetts, although all of their married life until his first election to the United States Senate upon statehood in 1890 was spent in Wyoming. They had two children, a daughter, Helen Frances, and a son, Frederick Emory. Mrs. Warren was the president of church, literary and charitable societies of Cheyenne, vice-president of the Foundling Hospital, and Daughter of the American Revolution.

== Business and politics ==
Following the Civil War, Warren engaged in farming and stock-raising in Massachusetts before moving to Wyoming (then part of the Territory of Dakota) in 1868. Settling in Cheyenne, Warren engaged in real estate, mercantile business, livestock raising and the establishment of Cheyenne's first lighting system, becoming quite wealthy.

Warren's political work included: member, Wyoming Territorial Senate (1873–1874, 1884–1885), serving as senate president; member, Cheyenne City Council (1873–1874); treasurer of Wyoming (1876, 1879, 1882, 1884); and Mayor of Cheyenne (1885).

In February 1885, Warren was appointed Governor of the Territory of Wyoming by President Chester A. Arthur, although he was removed by Democratic President Grover Cleveland in November 1886. He was reappointed by President Benjamin Harrison in April 1889, and served until 1890, when he was elected first Governor of Wyoming (October 11, 1890 – November 24, 1890).

== Senate years and death ==
In November 1890, Warren resigned as governor, having been elected to the United States Senate as a Republican, serving until March 4, 1893. He then resumed his former business pursuits before returning to the Senate (March 4, 1895–November 24, 1929). Warren chaired the following Senate Committees:

- Committee on Irrigation and Reclamation of Arid Lands
- Committee on Claims
- Committee on Irrigation
- Committee on Military Affairs
- Committee on Public Buildings and Grounds
- Committee on Agriculture and Forestry
- Committee on Appropriations
- Committee on Engrossed Bills

Warren died on November 24, 1929, in Washington, D.C. His funeral service was held in the United States Senate chamber. At the time of his death, he had served longer than any other U.S. senator.

== Legacy ==
F. E. Warren Air Force Base in Cheyenne, Wyoming is named after Warren. Additionally, Warren's daughter married then-Captain John J. Pershing in 1905. Several years later, President Theodore Roosevelt promoted Pershing from captain to brigadier general over 900 senior officers. Pershing's wife and three daughters were later killed during a fire at the Presidio in San Francisco. Warren was also the first senator to hire a female staffer and, as appropriations chairman during World War I, he was instrumental in funding the American efforts. Warren and his second wife, Clara LaBarron Morgan, bought the Nagle Warren Mansion in 1915, and their dining room hosted people such as presidents Theodore Roosevelt and William Howard Taft. This mansion is now listed on the National Register of Historic Places. In 1958, he was inducted into the Hall of Great Westerners of the National Cowboy & Western Heritage Museum.

== See also ==
- List of Medal of Honor recipients
- List of American Civil War Medal of Honor recipients: T–Z
- National Irrigation Congress
- List of members of the United States Congress who died in office (1900–1949)

Party political offices
First	Republican nominee for Governor of Wyoming; 1890	Succeeded by Edward Ivinson
First	Republican nominee for U.S. Senator from Wyoming (Class 2); 1918, 1924	Succeeded by Robert D. Carey
Political offices
Preceded by Joseph M. Carey	Mayor of Cheyenne, Wyoming; 1885	Succeeded by '
Preceded by Elliot S.N. Morgan	Governor of Wyoming Territory; 1885–1886	Succeeded by George W. Baxter
Preceded by Thomas Moonlight	Governor of Wyoming Territory; 1889–1890	Succeeded by Himself as state governor
Preceded by Himself as Territorial Governor	Governor of Wyoming; October 11, 1890 - November 24, 1890	Succeeded by Amos W. Barber
U.S. Senate
Preceded by (none)	U.S. Senator (Class 1) from Wyoming; November 18, 1890 – March 4, 1893	Succeeded by Clarence D. Clark
Preceded by Joseph M. Carey	U.S. Senator (Class 2) from Wyoming; March 4, 1895 – November 24, 1929	Succeeded by Patrick J. Sullivan
Honorary titles
Preceded by Henry Cabot Lodge	Dean of the United States Senate; November 9, 1924 – November 24, 1929	Succeeded by Furnifold M. Simmons
National Rifle Association of America
Preceded by Smith W. Brookhart	President of the NRA; 1925	Succeeded by Smith W. Brookhart
