= Amos W. Barber =

2nd Governor of Wyoming (1860–1915)

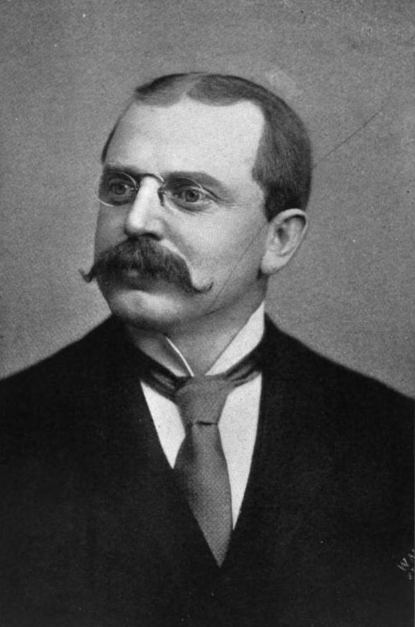

2nd Governor of Wyoming
- In office November 24, 1890 – January 2, 1893
- Preceded by: Francis E. Warren
- Succeeded by: John Eugene Osborne

1st Secretary of State of Wyoming
- In office 1890–1895
- Preceded by: John W. Meldrum
- Succeeded by: Charles W. Burdick

Personal details
- Born: Amos Walker Barber; July 25, 1860 Doylestown, Pennsylvania, U.S.
- Died: May 18, 1915 (aged 54) Rochester, Minnesota, U.S.
- Party: Republican
- Spouse: Amelia Kent
- Children: 2
- Parents: Alfred H. Barber (father); Asenath Walker (mother)
- Education: University of Pennsylvania

Amos Walker Barber (July 25, 1860 – May 18, 1915) was an American surgeon and politician who served as the second governor of Wyoming from 1890 to 1893.

== Biography ==
Amos Barber was born in Doylestown, Bucks County, in Pennsylvania, to Alfred H. Barber and Asenath Walker. According to his grave stone his year of birth was 1860, not 1861 as given in some sources. After attending local schools, he studied literature and medicine at the University of Pennsylvania.

After graduating in 1883, Barber worked as a staff physician at the Pennsylvania Hospital, until he moved to Wyoming. He married Amelia Kent in 1892 and the couple had two children.

== Career ==
In 1885, Barber moved to Wyoming to take up a position as surgeon in charge of the military hospital at Fort Fetterman. He was promoted to Acting Surgeon in the United States Army and accompanied General George Crook's expedition to Arizona, then was assigned to duty at Fort D. A. Russell. After resigning from the United States military, he was in charge of the hospital of the Wyoming Stock Association. In 1889, he began private practice in Cheyenne.

In 1890, Barber was elected Secretary of State of Wyoming as a Republican. Just eleven months later, however, Governor Francis E. Warren resigned to take up a United States Senate seat, and Barber was catapulted to the position of Acting Governor on November 24, 1890, at the age of just 30. During his administration, he called out state troops to quell a Pine Ridge Indian outbreak and asked for federal assistance with the Johnson County War between cattlemen (WSGA) and cowboys (small time ranchers) in Johnson County in 1892. When John E. Osborne was elected on January 2, 1893, Barber continued on as Secretary of State under Osborne until his term ran out in 1895 and then returned to Cheyenne and his practice.

Barber rejoined the military in 1898, acting as assistant surgeon for the Spanish–American War. He then returned to his practice of medicine in Cheyenne. he died on May 18, 1915 at age 54.

Political offices
Preceded by new office	Secretary of State of Wyoming; 1890–1895	Succeeded by Charles W. Burdick
Preceded by Francis E. Warren	Governor of Wyoming; November 24, 1890 – January 2, 1893	Succeeded by John E. Osborne
