= List of elections in 1898 =

The following elections occurred in the year 1898.

== Asia ==
- March 1898 Japanese general election
- August 1898 Japanese general election
- 1898 Philippine Malolos Congress elections

== Europe ==
- 1898 Belgian general election
- 1898 Danish Folketing election
- 1898 Danish Landsting election
- 1898 French legislative election
- 1898 German federal election
- 1898 Liechtenstein general election
- 1898 Serbian parliamentary election
- 1898 Spanish general election

=== United Kingdom ===
- 1898 South Norfolk by-election

== North America ==
=== Canada ===
- 1898 British Columbia general election
- 1898 Edmonton municipal election
- 1898 Northwest Territories general election
- 1898 Ontario general election

=== United States ===
- 1898 New York state election
- 1898 United States elections

==== United States lieutenant gubernatorial ====
- 1898 California lieutenant gubernatorial election
- 1898 Connecticut lieutenant gubernatorial election
- 1898 Minnesota lieutenant gubernatorial election
- 1898 Nebraska lieutenant gubernatorial election
- 1898 Texas lieutenant gubernatorial election
- 1898 Wisconsin lieutenant gubernatorial election

==== United States gubernatorial ====
- 1898 Alabama gubernatorial election
- 1898 Arkansas gubernatorial election
- 1898 California gubernatorial election
- 1898 Colorado gubernatorial election
- 1898 Connecticut gubernatorial election
- 1898 Georgia gubernatorial election
- 1898 Idaho gubernatorial election
- 1898 Kansas gubernatorial election
- 1898 Maine gubernatorial election
- 1898 Massachusetts gubernatorial election
- 1898 Michigan gubernatorial election
- 1898 Minnesota gubernatorial election
- 1898 Nebraska gubernatorial election
- 1898 Nevada gubernatorial election
- 1898 New Hampshire gubernatorial election
- 1898 New Jersey gubernatorial election
- 1898 New York gubernatorial election
- 1898 North Dakota gubernatorial election
- 1898 Oregon gubernatorial election
- 1898 Pennsylvania gubernatorial election
- 1898 Rhode Island gubernatorial election
- 1898 South Carolina gubernatorial election
- 1898 South Dakota gubernatorial election
- 1898 Tennessee gubernatorial election
- 1898 Texas gubernatorial election
- 1898 United States gubernatorial elections
- 1898 Vermont gubernatorial election
- 1898 Wisconsin gubernatorial election
- 1898 Wyoming gubernatorial election

==== United States House of Representatives ====
- 1898 United States House of Representatives elections
- United States House of Representatives elections in California, 1898
- United States House of Representatives elections in South Carolina, 1898

==== United States Senate ====
- 1898–99 United States Senate elections
- 1898 United States Senate election in Ohio
- 1898 United States Senate special election in South Carolina

==== United States mayoral elections ====
- 1898 Los Angeles mayoral election
- 1898 Manchester, New Hampshire, mayoral election
- 1898 Milwaukee mayoral election
- 1898 San Francisco mayoral election
- 1898 Worcester, Massachusetts mayoral election

== Latin America ==
- 1898 Argentine general election
- 1898 Brazilian presidential election
- 1897–98 Colombian presidential election
- 1898 Guatemalan presidential election
- 1898 Honduran general election

== Oceania ==
=== New Zealand ===
- 1898 City of Wellington by-election

== See also ==
- Category:1898 elections
