= 1898 United States gubernatorial elections =

- November 8, 1898 (Note: Alabama, Arkansas, Georgia, Maine, Oregon, Rhode Island and Vermont held early elections.)

28 governorships
	Majority party	Minority party
Party	Republican	Democratic
Seats before	24	16
Seats after	25	16
Seat change	▲1	Steady
Seats up	15	9
Seats won	16	9
	Third party	Fourth party
Party	Populist	Silver
Seats before	4	1
Seats after	3	1
Seat change	▼1	Steady
Seats up	3	1
Seats won	2	1
- Democratic gain Democratic hold Republican gain Republican hold Populist hold Silver hold

United States gubernatorial elections were held in 1898, in 28 states, concurrent with the House and Senate elections, on November 8, 1898 (except in Alabama, Arkansas, Georgia, Maine, Oregon, Rhode Island and Vermont, which held early elections).

== Results ==
State	Incumbent	Party	Status	Opposing candidates
Alabama (held, 1 August 1898)	Joseph F. Johnston	Democratic	Re-elected, 66.97%	Gilbert B. Deans (Populist) 30.32% Andrew J. Warner (Colored Republican) 1.90% W. B. Witherspoon (Prohibition) 0.80%
Arkansas (held, 5 September 1898)	Daniel Webster Jones	Democratic	Re-elected, 67.35%	H. F. Auten (Democratic) 24.60% W. S. Morgan (Populist) 7.45% Alexander McKnight (Prohibition) 0.61%
California	James Budd	Democratic	Retired, Republican victory	Henry Gage (Republican) (Note: Some sources indicate Gage ran under a fusion ticket between the Republicans and the Union Labor Party.) 51.68% James G. Maguire (Democratic) (Note: Maguire ran under a fusion ticket between the Democrats, the Populists and the Silver Republican Party.) 45.03% Job Harriman (Socialist Labor) 1.79% J. E. McComas (Prohibition) 1.50%
Colorado	Alva Adams	Democratic	Retired, Democratic victory	Charles S. Thomas (Democratic) (Note: Thomas ran under a fusion ticket between the Democrats and the Populist Party.) 62.89% Henry R. Wolcott (Republican) 34.17% Robert H. Rhodes (Prohibition) 1.81% Nixon Elliott (Socialist Labor) 1.14%
Connecticut	Lorrin A. Cooke	Republican	Retired, Republican victory	George E. Lounsbury (Republican) 54.17% Daniel N. Morgan (Democratic) 42.94% Charles Stodel (Socialist Labor) 1.92% Charles E. Steele (Prohibition) 0.98%
Georgia (held, 5 October 1898)	William Yates Atkinson	Democratic	Term-limited, Democratic victory	Allen D. Candler (Democratic) 69.75% John R. Hogan (Populist) 30.25%
Idaho	Frank Steunenberg	Democratic (Note: Steunenberg ran under a fusion ticket between the Democrats and the Silver Republican Party.)	Re-elected, 48.83%	Albert B. Moss (Republican) 42.30% James H. Anderson (Populist) 13.51% Mary C. Johnson (Prohibition) 2.96%
Kansas	John W. Leedy	Populist (Note: Leedy ran under a fusion ticket between the Democrats and the Populist Party.)	Defeated, 46.55%	William Eugene Stanley (Republican) 51.81% William A. Peffer (Prohibition) 1.42% Caleb Lipscomb (Socialist Labor) 0.22%
Maine (held, 12 September 1898)	Llewellyn Powers	Republican	Re-elected, 62.97%	Samuel L. Lord (Democratic) 33.16% Ammi S. Ladd (Prohibition) 2.71% Robert Gerry (Populist) 0.75% Erastus Lermond (National Democratic) 0.37% Scattering 0.05%
Massachusetts	Roger Wolcott	Republican	Re-elected, 60.16%	Alexander B. Bruce (Democratic) 33.98% George R. Peare (Socialist Labor) 3.17% Samuel B. Shapleigh (Prohibition) 1.49% Winfield P. Porter (Social Democrat) 1.18% Scattering 0.03%
Michigan	Hazen S. Pingree	Republican	Re-elected, 57.75%	Justin R. Whiting (Democratic) (Note: Whiting ran under a fusion ticket between the Democrats, the Populists and the Silver Republican Party.) 39.92% Noah W. Cheever (Prohibition) 1.66% Sullivan W. Cook (Midroad-Populist) 0.39% George Hasseler (Socialist Labor) 0.26%
Minnesota	David Marston Clough	Republican	Retired, Democratic victory	John Lind (Democratic) (Note: Lind ran under a fusion ticket between the Democrats and the Populist Party.) 52.26% William Henry Eustis (Republican) 44.26% George W. Higgins (Prohibition) 2.10% Lionel C. Long (Midroad-Populist) 0.71% William B. Hammond (Socialist Labor) 0.67%
Nebraska	Silas A. Holcomb	Populist	Retired, Populist victory	William A. Poynter (Populist) (Note: Poynter ran under a fusion ticket between the Democrats, the Populists and the Silver Republican Party.) 50.19% Monroe Leland Hayward (Republican) 48.77% R. V. Muir (Prohibition) 0.90% H. S. Aley (Socialist Labor) 0.13% Scattering 0.01%
Nevada	Reinhold Sadler (acting)	Silver	Re-elected, 35.67%	William McMillan (Republican) 35.45% George Russell (Democratic) 20.55% J. B. McCullough (Populist) 8.33%
New Hampshire	George A. Ramsdell	Republican	Retired, Republican victory	Frank W. Rollins (Republican) 54.23% Charles F. Stone (Democratic) 43.23% Augustus G. Stevens (Prohibition) 1.62% Sumner F. Claflin (Social Democrat) 0.42% Benjamin F. Whitehouse (Socialist Labor) 0.32% Gardiner J. Greenleaf (Populist) 0.13% Scattering 0.05%
New Jersey	David Ogden Watkins (acting)	Republican	Retired, Republican victory	Foster McGowan Voorhees (Republican) 48.91% Elvin W. Crane (Democratic) 47.27% Thomas H. Landon (Prohibition) 2.05% Matthew Maguire (Socialist Labor) 1.63% Frederick Schrayshuen (Populist) 0.15%
New York	Frank S. Black	Republican	Lost re-nomination, Republican victory	Theodore Roosevelt (Republican) 49.02% Augustus Van Wyck (Democratic) 47.70% Ben Hanford (Socialist Labor) 1.77% John Kline (Prohibition) 1.36% Theodore Bacon (Citizens Union) 0.16%
North Dakota	Joseph M. Devine	Republican	Retired to run for Lieutenant Governor of North Dakota, Republican victory	Frederick B. Fancher (Republican) 59.22% David M. Holmes (Democratic) (Note: Holmes ran under a fusion ticket between the Democrats and the Populist Party.) 40.78%
Oregon (held, 6 June 1898)	William Paine Lord	Republican	Lost re-nomination, Republican victory	Theodore Thurston Geer (Republican) 53.22% W. R. King (Democratic) (Note: King ran under a fusion ticket between the Democrats and the Populist Party.) 40.77% John C. Luce (Midroad-Populist) 3.40% H. M. Clinton (Prohibition) 2.62%
Pennsylvania	Daniel H. Hastings	Republican	Term-limited, Republican victory	William A. Stone (Republican) 49.01% George A. Jenks (Democratic) 36.87% Silas C. Swallow (Prohibition) (Note: Swallow also stood on the Honest Government, Populist and Liberty tickets.) 13.68% J. Mahlon Barnes (Socialist Labor) 0.44%
Rhode Island (held, 6 April 1898)	Elisha Dyer Jr.	Republican	Re-elected, 57.74%	Daniel T. Church (Democratic) 30.86% James P. Reid (Socialist Labor) 6.71% Edwin A. Lewis (Prohibition) 4.69%
South Carolina	William Haselden Ellerbe	Democratic	Re-elected, 100.00%	(Democratic primary run-off results); William Haselden Ellerbe 53.14% Claudius Cyprian Featherstone 46.86%
South Dakota	Andrew E. Lee	Populist (Note: Lee ran under a fusion ticket between the Democrats, the Populists and the Silver Republican Party.)	Re-elected, 49.63%	Kirk G. Phillips (Republican) 49.18% Knute Lewis (Prohibition) 1.18%
Tennessee	Robert Love Taylor	Democratic	Retired, Democratic victory	Benton McMillin (Democratic) 57.92% James Fowler (Republican) 39.81% W. D. Turnley (Populist) 1.33% R. N. Richardson (Prohibition) 0.94%
Texas	Charles Allen Culberson	Democratic	Retired, Democratic victory	Joseph D. Sayers (Democratic) 71.19% Barnett Gibbs (Populist) 28.07% R. P. Bailey (Prohibition) 0.60% G. H. Royal (Socialist Labor) 0.13% Scattering 0.02%
Vermont (held, 6 September 1898)	Josiah Grout	Republican	Retired, Republican victory	Edward Curtis Smith (Republican) 70.96% Thomas W. Moloney (Democratic) 27.03% Cyrus W. Wyman (Prohibition) 1.98% Scattering 0.04%
Wisconsin	Edward Scofield	Republican	Re-elected, 52.56%	Hiram Wilson Sawyer (Democratic) 41.09% Albinus A. Worsley (Populist) 2.59% Eugene W. Chafin (Prohibition) 2.45% Howard Tuttle (Social Democrat) 0.77% Henry Riese (Socialist Labor) 0.45% Scattering 0.10%
Wyoming	William A. Richards	Republican	Retired, Republican victory	DeForest Richards (Republican) 52.43% Horace C. Alger (Democratic) 45.39% E. B. Viall (Populist) 2.18%

== See also ==
- 1898 United States elections

== Bibliography ==
- Glashan, Roy R. (1979). American Governors and Gubernatorial Elections, 1775-1978. Meckler Books. ISBN 0-930466-17-9.
- Gubernatorial Elections, 1787-1997. Washington, D.C.: Congressional Quarterly Inc. 1998. ISBN 1-56802-396-0.
- Dubin, Michael J. (2014). United States Gubernatorial Elections, 1861-1911: The Official Results by State and County. Jefferson, North Carolina: McFarland. ISBN 978-0-7864-4722-0.
- The World Almanac and Encyclopedia, 1899. New York, NY: The Press Publishing Co. 1899.
- Rhoades, Henry Eckford, ed. (1899). The Tribune Almanac and Political Register, 1899. New York, NY: The Tribune Association.
