= 1898 Wyoming state elections =

A general election was held in the U.S. state of Wyoming on Tuesday, November 8, 1898. All of the state's executive officers—the Governor, Secretary of State, Auditor, Treasurer, and Superintendent of Public Instruction—were up for election. The Republican Party retained all of the offices up for election, though by reduced margins from 1894 as the Populist Party's performance decreased considerably.

== Governor ==
Incumbent Republican Governor William A. Richards ran for re-election to a second term, but was defeated for renomination at the Republican convention by DeForest Richards. In the general election, Richards faced former State Representative Horace C. Alger, whom he defeated, but by a narrower margin than Governor Richards won by in 1894.

1898 Wyoming gubernatorial election
Party	Candidate	Votes	%	±%
Republican	DeForest Richards	10,383	52.43%	−0.18%
Democratic	Horace C. Alger	8,989	45.39%	+9.29%
Populist	E. B. Viall	431	2.18%	−9.10%
Majority		1,394	7.04%	−9.47%
Turnout		19,803	100.00%	
Republican hold				

== Secretary of State ==
Incumbent Republican Secretary of State Charles W. Burdick did not seek re-election to a second term. At the Republican convention, Fenimore Chatterton, a former State Senator, was nominated. He faced Rock Springs businessman David Miller, a former Cheyenne City Councilman and former territorial legislator, in the general election. Chatterton ultimately defeated Miller by a decisive margin, but reduced from four years prior.

=== General election ===
==== Results ====
1898 Wyoming Secretary of State election
Party	Candidate	Votes	%	±%
Republican	Fenimore Chatterton	10,458	53.26%	−0.48%
Democratic	David Miller	8,742	44.52%	+10.77%
Populist	Shakespeare E. Seely	435	2.22%	−10.29%
Majority		1,716	8.74%	−11.25%
Turnout		19,635	100.00%	
Republican hold				

== Auditor ==
Incumbent Republican State Auditor William O. Owen declined to run for re-election. The Republican convention nominated LeRoy Grant, the deputy state revenue collector and a former State Representative from Albany County, as Owen's successor. In the general election, Grant was opposed by Charles H. Priest, a state water commissioner and former Uinta County Treasurer. Priest was a Free Silver Republican, who was nominated for State Auditor as part of a fusion deal with the state Democratic Party. However, despite Priest's bipartisan appeal, Owen defeated him in a landslide.

=== General election ===
==== Results ====
1898 Wyoming Auditor election
Party	Candidate	Votes	%	±%
Republican	LeRoy Grant	10,806	55.40%	+2.83%
Democratic	Charles H. Priest	8,217	42.12%	+7.54%
Populist	John F. Pierce	484	2.48%	−10.37%
Majority		2,589	13.27%	−4.72%
Turnout		19,507	100.00%	
Republican hold				

== Treasurer ==
Incumbent Republican Treasurer Henry G. Hay was barred from seeking a second consecutive term as a Treasurer. State Senate President George E. Abbott was nominated as Hay's successor at the Republican state convention, and former Territorial Treasurer Luke Voorhees, a former Republican, was nominated as his replacement at the Democratic convention, beating out Colin Hunter. In the general election, Abbott defeated Voorhees by a wide margin.

=== General election ===
==== Results ====
1898 Wyoming Treasurer election
Party	Candidate	Votes	%	±%
Republican	George E. Abbott	10,634	54.58%	+1.54%
Democratic	Luke Voorhees	8,417	43.20%	+9.13%
Populist	John Milton Rouser	434	2.23%	=10.68
Majority		2,217	11.38%	−7.59%
Turnout		19,485	100.00%	
Republican hold				

== Superintendent of Public Instruction ==
Incumbent Republican Superintendent Estelle Reed resigned from office on January 27, 1898, and Carroll H. Parmelee was appointed by Governor Richards as Reed's replacement. Parmelee declined to seek re-election to a full term, and Thomas T. Tynan, the Clerk of the Fourth Judicial District Court, was nominated at the Republican convention for Superintendent. At the Democratic convention, Jerome F. Brown, a State Representative from Sheridan County, was nominated. Brown was a Free Silver Republican and was nominated by the Democratic convention as part of a fusion with Silver Republicans.

=== General election ===
==== Results ====
1898 Wyoming Superintendent of Public Instruction election
Party	Candidate	Votes	%	±%
Republican	Thomas T. Tynan	10,735	55.16%	−1.50%
Democratic	Jerome F. Brown	8,208	42.17%	+8.84%
Populist	M. A. Stocks	520	2.67%	−7.34%
Majority		2,527	12.98%	−10.33%
Turnout		19,463		
Republican hold				
