= 1902 Wyoming state elections =

A general election was held in the U.S. state of Wyoming on Tuesday, November 4, 1902. All of the state's executive officers—the Governor, Secretary of State, Auditor, Treasurer, and Superintendent of Public Instruction—were up for election. Republicans held onto all statewide offices by landslide margins.

== Governor ==
Incumbent Republican Governor DeForest Richards ran for re-election to a second term, and was renominated at the Republican convention. In the general election, he faced Cody Mayor George T. Beck, whom he defeated in a landslide to win a second term. However, several months into Richards's term, he died in office, elevating Secretary of State Fenimore Chatterton to the governorship and triggering a special election in 1904.

1902 Wyoming gubernatorial election
Party	Candidate	Votes	%	±%
Republican	DeForest Richards (inc.)	14,483	57.81%	+5.38%
Democratic	George T. Beck	10,017	39.98%	+9.29%
Socialist	Henry Breitenstein	552	2.20%	—
Majority		4,466	17.83%	+10.79%
Turnout		25,052	100.00%	
Republican hold				

== Secretary of State ==
Incumbent Republican Secretary of State Fenimore Chatterton ran for re-election to a second term. He was renominated by the Republican Party, and was opposed by the Democratic nominee, David N. Stickney, a cattleman from Laramie and the former principal of Rawlins city schools. Chatterton defeated Stickney in a landslide. Shortly into Chatterton's term, he became acting Governor upon the death of Governor DeForest Richards.

=== General election ===
==== Results ====
1902 Wyoming Secretary of State election
Party	Candidate	Votes	%	±%
Republican	Fenimore Chatterton (inc.)	14,695	59.56%	+6.30%
Democratic	David N. Stickney	9,373	37.99%	−6.53%
Socialist	Daniel P. Gates	604	2.45%	—
Majority		5,322	21.57%	+12.83%
Turnout		24,672	100.00%	
Republican hold				

== Auditor ==
Incumbent Republican State Auditor LeRoy Grant ran for re-election to a second term. He was renominated by the Republican Party and was opposed by Democratic nominee W. Dean Hayes, a cashier at the First National Bank of Meeteetse. Grant defeated Hayes in a landslide to win a second term.

=== General election ===
==== Results ====
1902 Wyoming Auditor election
Party	Candidate	Votes	%	±%
Republican	LeRoy Grant (inc.)	14,863	60.41%	+5.01%
Democratic	W. Dean Hayes	9,226	37.50%	−4.63%
Socialist	William L. O'Neill	515	2.09%	—
Majority		5,637	22.91%	+9.64%
Turnout		24,604	100.00%	
Republican hold				

== Treasurer ==
Incumbent Republican Treasurer George E. Abbott was barred from seeking re-election. Accordingly, former State Treasurer Henry G. Hay was nominated by the Republican Party following a contentious selection at the state party convention. The Democratic convention nominated Colin Hunter, a former member of the territorial council and the former chairman of the territorial board of penitentiary commissioners. Hay ultimately defeated Hunter by a wide margin, enabling him to win his second non-consecutive term as State Treasurer. However, Hay would resign less than a year into his term, causing a special election to be held in 1904.

=== General election ===
==== Results ====
1902 Wyoming Treasurer election
Party	Candidate	Votes	%	±%
Republican	Henry G. Hay	14,603	59.35%	+4.77%
Democratic	Colin Hunter	9,498	38.60%	−4.60%
Socialist	Frank Ketchum	504	2.05%	—
Majority		5,105	20.75%	+9.37%
Turnout		24,605	100.00%	
Republican hold				

== Superintendent of Public Instruction ==
Incumbent Republican Superintendent Thomas T. Tynan ran for re-election to a second term. Though he faced some opposition at the Republican convention, he was ultimately renominated. Anna Bramel DeLario, a former public school teacher in Laramie and a former instructor at the University of Wyoming, was nominated by the Democratic convention as their candidate to oppose Tynan. Tynan won re-election over DeLario by a wide margin.

=== General election ===
==== Results ====
1902 Wyoming Superintendent of Public Instruction election
Party	Candidate	Votes	%	±%
Republican	Thomas T. Tynan (inc.)	14,398	58.43%	+3.27%
Democratic	Anna Bramel DeLario	9,772	39.66%	−2.52%
Socialist	Eloise C. Brown	472	1.92%	—
Majority		4,626	18.77%	+5.79%
Turnout		24,642		
Republican hold				
