= 1904 Wyoming state elections =

A general election was held in the U.S. state of Wyoming on Tuesday, November 8, 1904. Two special elections were held: one for Governor and one for State Treasurer. In the gubernatorial election, acting Governor Fenimore Chatterton ran for re-election but was defeated for renomination at the Republican convention by Bryant B. Brooks, who won the subsequent special election over Democrat John E. Osborne. In the special election for State Treasurer, Republican William C. Irvine, who was appointed to the office by Governor Chatterton, won re-election.

== Governor ==
On April 28, 1903, Republican Governor DeForest Richards died in office, elevating Secretary of State Fenimore Chatterton to the governorship. Chatterton sought re-election in the special election that followed, but lost renomination to Bryant B. Brooks. In the subsequent general election, Brooks defeated Democratic nominee John E. Osborne by a wide margin.

1904 Wyoming gubernatorial special election
Party	Candidate	Votes	%	±%
Republican	Bryant B. Brooks	17,765	57.48%	−0.34%
Democratic	John E. Osborne	10,017	39.98%	−0.72%
Socialist	James W. Gates	816	2.64%	+0.44%
Prohibition	George W. Blain	191	0.62%	—
Majority		5,628	18.21%	+0.38%
Turnout		30,909	100.00%	
Republican hold				

== Treasurer ==
Less than a year into his four-year term as State Treasurer, Henry G. Hay resigned from office in September 1903 to accept a position with the United States Steel Corporation. A special Republican convention was convened to name Hay's replacement, and the convention settled on William C. Irvine, whose name it recommended to Governor Fenimore Chatterton to appoint as Hay's successor. Chatterton, though not obligated to follow the convention's recommendation, did so, and Irvine served until the 1904 special election.

In 1904, Irvine ran for re-election. He was renominated at the Republican convention, and faced former State Representative Horace C. Alger, the 1898 Democratic nominee for Governor. He overwhelmingly defeated Alger, winning the right to finish the final two years of Hay's term as Treasurer.

=== General election ===
==== Results ====
1904 Wyoming Treasurer special election
Party	Candidate	Votes	%	±%
Republican	William C. Irvine (inc.)	18,114	59.74%	+0.39%
Democratic	Horace C. Alger	11,173	36.85%	−1.76%
Socialist	Frank Ketchum	831	2.74%	+0.69%
Prohibition	David Gordon	205	0.68%	—
Majority		6,941	22.89%	+2.14%
Turnout		30,323	100.00%	
Republican hold				
