= Governor Richards =

Governor Richards may refer to:

- Ann Richards (1933–2006), 45th Governor of Texas
- Arthur Richards, 1st Baron Milverton (1885–1978), Governor of North Borneo, Gambia, Fiji, Jamaica, and Nigeria for various periods between 1930 and 1948
- DeForest Richards (1846–1903), 5th Governor of Wyoming
- Edmund Charles Smith Richards (1889–1955), Governor of Nyasaland from 1942 to 1947
- Francis Richards (diplomat) (born 1945), Governor of Gibraltar from 2003 to 2006
- John Gardiner Richards Jr. (1864–1941), 96th Governor of South Carolina
- William A. Richards (1849–1912), 4th Governor of Wyoming
