= 1899 United States Senate election in Massachusetts =

- January 1899

280 members of the Massachusetts General Court 141 votes needed to win
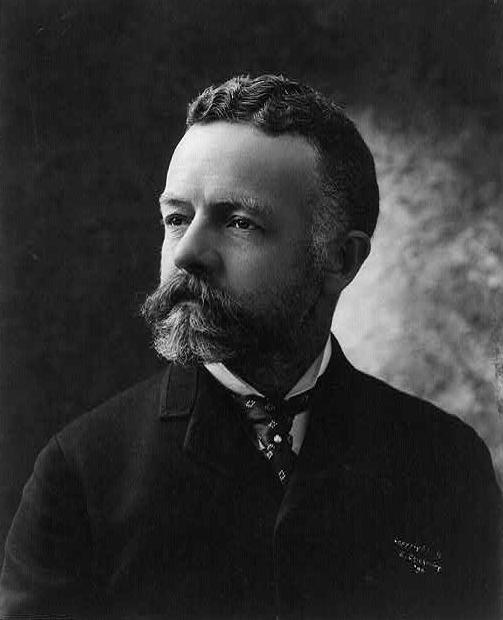

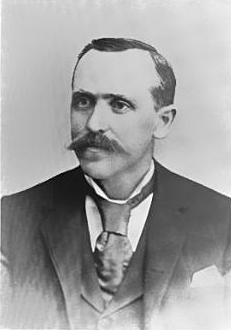
Nominee	Henry Cabot Lodge	Alexander B. Bruce
Party	Republican	Democratic
Electoral vote	190	72
Percentage	67.86%	25.71%
Senator before election
Henry Cabot Lodge
Republican
Elected Senator
Henry Cabot Lodge
Republican

The 1899 United States Senate election in Massachusetts was held during January 1899. Republican incumbent Henry Cabot Lodge won election to a second term easily.

At the time, Massachusetts elected United States senators by a majority vote of the combined houses of the Massachusetts General Court.

== Background ==
Although Democrats made gains in the 1898 state elections, the General Court remained overwhelmingly Republican, assuring Lodge's re-election.

== Nominating caucuses ==
The Republican legislative caucus unanimously re-nominated Senator Lodge by acclamation on January 10, although his chief critic within the party, State Senator Herbert Parsons of Greenfield, did not attend.

The Democrats nominated Alexander B. Bruce, the former mayor of Lawrence and candidate for governor in 1898.

== Results ==
The vote in the House was 159 for Lodge, 65 for Bruce, and 2 for Social Democrat Winfield P. Porter.

The vote in the Senate was 31 for Lodge and 7 for Bruce. Senator Herbert Parsons refused to vote for Lodge.

1899 United States Senate election in Massachusetts
Party	Candidate	Votes	%
Republican	Henry Cabot Lodge (incumbent)	190	67.86%
Democratic	Alexander B. Bruce	72	25.71%
Social Democratic	Winfield P. Porter	2	0.71%
None	No vote	16	5.71%
Total votes		280	100.00%
