= 1902 Wyoming gubernatorial election =

- November 4, 1902
- Turnout: 27.07% of Total Population ▼5.55
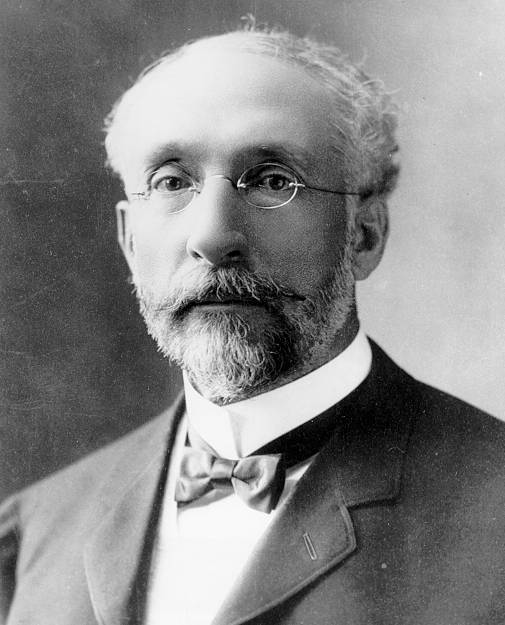

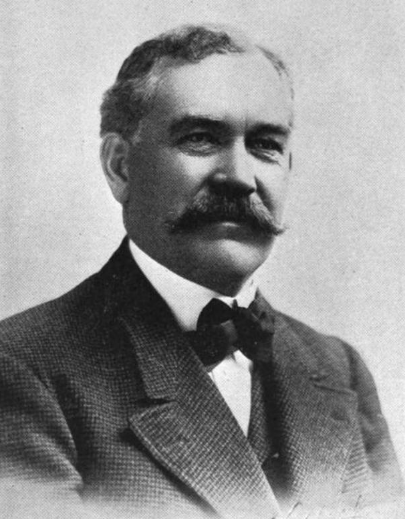
Nominee	DeForest Richards	George T. Beck
Party	Republican	Democratic
Popular vote	14,483	10,017
Percentage	57.81%	39.99%
- County results Richards: 50–60% 60–70%
Governor before election
DeForest Richards
Republican
Elected Governor
DeForest Richards
Republican

The 1902 Wyoming gubernatorial election was held on November 4, 1902. Incumbent Republican Governor DeForest Richards ran for re-election. He was once again nominated by the Republican Party, and faced Cody Mayor George T. Beck, the Democratic nominee, and Socialist Party nominee Henry Breitenstein in the general election. Richards won re-election in a landslide, becoming the first Governor of Wyoming to win re-election. However, Richards did not end up serving a full second term; on April 28, 1903, he died in office, elevating Secretary of State Fenimore Chatterton to the Governorship and triggering a special election in 1904.

== Party conventions ==
At the Republican convention on July 15, 1902, Richards, along with the other eligible Republican incumbents, was unanimously nominated for re-election. Similarly, George T. Beck, the newly elected Mayor of Cody, faced no opposition at the Democratic convention and was nominated unanimously.

== General election ==
=== Results ===
1902 Wyoming gubernatorial election
Party	Candidate	Votes	%	±%
Republican	DeForest Richards (inc.)	14,483	57.81%	+5.38%
Democratic	George T. Beck	10,017	39.98%	+9.29%
Socialist	Henry Breitenstein	552	2.20%	—
Majority		4,466	17.83%	+10.79%
Turnout		25,052	100.00%	
Republican hold				

=== Results by county ===
County	Richards	Votes	Beck	Votes	Breitenstein	Votes
Uinta	57.68%	2,216	41.10%	1,579	1.22%	47
Big Horn	55.04%	961	44.50%	777	0.46%	8
Fremont	56.35%	816	42.96%	622	0.69%	10
Sweetwater	58.33%	1,103	37.44%	708	4.23%	80
Sheridan	57.16%	1,193	40.20%	839	2.64%	55
Johnson	55.27%	566	43.55%	446	1.17%	12
Natrona	64.77%	616	35.12%	334	0.11%	1
Carbon	64.30%	1,864	34.39%	997	1.31%	38
Crook	56.50%	730	43.11%	557	0.39%	5
Weston	65.38%	527	34.24%	276	0.37%	3
Converse	65.44%	816	34.40%	429	0.16%	2
Albany	50.56%	1,173	40.56%	941	8.88%	206
Laramie	54.36%	1,902	43.21%	1,512	2.43%	85
