= Horace C. Alger =

American politician

Horace Chapin Alger

Member of the Wyoming House of Representatives
- In office 1895–1895

Personal details
- Born: April 15, 1857 Lowell, Massachusetts, US
- Died: September 28, 1906 (aged 49) Sheridan, Wyoming, US
- Party: Democratic

Horace C. Alger (April 15, 1857 – September 28, 1906) was an American politician who served in the Wyoming House of Representatives in 1895 and was the Democratic Party nominee for governor in 1898. He was defeated by DeForest Richards.

== Early life ==
Alger was born on April 15, 1857, in Lowell, Massachusetts. In 1879 he graduated from Harvard University. In 1885, he moved to Sheridan, Wyoming Territory, then a small town of roughly 100 people.

== Political career ==
In 1894, Alger was one of three Democrats elected to the Wyoming House of Representatives. He served during the 1895 legislature. In 1898, he was the Democratic nominee for Governor of Wyoming. He was defeated by seven percentage points to DeForest Richards.

== Death ==
Alger died on September 28, 1906, in Sheridan, Wyoming. His funeral was attended by about 2,000 people which was a large portion of the population of Sheridan.
