= Big Muddy, Wyoming =

Big Muddy
- Unincorporated community
- Location within the state of Wyoming
- Coordinates: 42°52′1″N 106°3′1″W
- Country: United States
- State: Wyoming
- County: Converse
- Elevation: 5,049 ft (1,539 m)
- Time zone: UTC-7 (Mountain (MST))
  - Summer (DST): UTC-6 (MST)

Big Muddy is an unincorporated community located in Converse County, Wyoming, United States.

Big Muddy was named after a nearby creek.

== Notable person ==
- Bryant B. Brooks (1861-1944) - cowboy, trapper, owner of the V Bar V Ranch, politician, author; served as governor of Wyoming from 1905 to 1911,
