= 1900 Georgia gubernatorial election =

- October 3, 1900
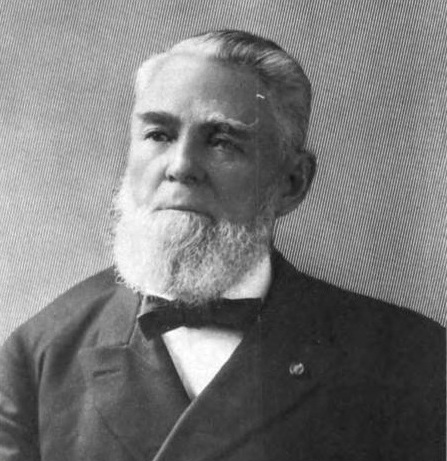

| Nominee | Allen D. Candler | John H. Traylor |
| Party | Democratic | Populist |
| Popular vote | 92,729 | 25,285 |
| Percentage | 78.58% | 21.42% |
- County results Terrell: 50–60% 60–70% 70–80% 80–90% >90% Traylor: 50–60%
Governor before election
Allen D. Candler
Democratic
Elected Governor
Allen D. Candler
Democratic

The 1900 Georgia gubernatorial election was held on October 3, 1900, in order to elect the Governor of Georgia. Democratic nominee and incumbent Governor Allen D. Candler defeated People's Party nominee John H. Traylor.

== General election ==
On election day, October 3, 1900, Democratic nominee Allen D. Candler won re-election with a margin of 67,444 votes against his opponent People's Party nominee John H. Traylor, thereby holding Democratic control over the office of Governor. Candler was sworn in for his second term on October 25, 1900.

=== Results ===
Georgia gubernatorial election, 1900
| Party | Candidate | Votes | % |
|---|---|---|---|
| Democratic | Allen D. Candler (incumbent) | 92,729 | 78.58 |
| Populist | John H. Traylor | 25,285 | 21.42 |
| Total votes | | 118,014 | 100.00 |
| Democratic hold | | | |
