= John Stephens Wood =

United States congressman from Georgia (1885–1968)

John S. Wood
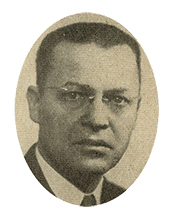

Member of the U.S. House of Representatives from Georgia's 9th district
- In office January 3, 1945 – January 3, 1953
- Preceded by: B. Frank Whelchel
- Succeeded by: Phillip M. Landrum
- In office March 4, 1931 – January 3, 1935
- Preceded by: Thomas Montgomery Bell
- Succeeded by: B. Frank Whelchel

Member of the Georgia House of Representatives
- In office 1917

Personal details
- Born: John Stephens Wood; February 8, 1885 Cherokee County, Georgia
- Died: September 12, 1968 (aged 83) Marietta, Georgia
- Resting place: Arlington Memorial Park, Sandy Springs, Georgia
- Party: Democratic Party
- Education: Mercer University

John Stephens Wood (February 8, 1885 – September 12, 1968) was an American attorney and politician from the state of Georgia, United States. He served as a Democrat in the United States House of Representatives, 1931–1935 and 1945–1953.

== Early life, education and career ==
Wood was born on a farm near Ball Ground, Cherokee County, Georgia, February 8, 1885. He attended the public schools and graduated from North Georgia Agricultural College in Dahlonega. He earned his law degree from Mercer University in Macon in 1910. He was admitted to the bar the same year and commenced the practice of law in Jasper, Georgia, the county seat of Pickens County.

== Career ==
In 1915, Wood turned up at the scene of the lynching of Leo Frank, Jewish factory owner in Atlanta, with Judge Newt Morris on the morning after the murder. He drove the vehicle in which Frank's body was conveyed to the undertaker. Wood was also a member of the Ku Klux Klan, albeit he only attended one meeting and later left the group.

=== Early political career ===
Entering politics, Wood was a member of the Georgia House of Representatives in 1917; served as Solicitor General of the Blue Ridge Judicial Circuit from 1921 to 1925. He was elected as a Superior Court Judge, Blue Ridge Judicial Circuit from 1925 to 1931.

=== Congress ===
In 1931, Wood was elected as a Democrat from Georgia's 9th congressional district to the 72nd United States Congress and was re-elected to the 73rd Congress (March 4, 1931 – January 3, 1935). He was unsuccessful in seeking renomination in 1934 and resumed the practice of law.

Ten years later, in 1944, Wood was elected to the 79th United States Congress serving until the 82nd Congress (January 3, 1945 – January 3, 1953). As chairman of the House Un-American Activities Committee, he had a prominent role in investigating the American Communist Party and the entertainment industry; the committee charged 10 persons with contempt of Congress for refusing to testify, and their careers and reputations were severely damaged in what was called the Hollywood Blacklist.

Wood was criticized for failing to investigate the Ku Klux Klan in the same period, as it was expanding in chapters in opposition to civil rights activism by African-Americans.

== Later years ==
Wood did not seek re-election in 1952 and he resumed the practice of law in Canton, Georgia. Finally, failing health forced his retirement.

=== Death and burial ===
Wood died in Marietta, Georgia, September 12, 1968, and was interred in Arlington Memorial Park, Sandy Springs, Georgia.

U.S. House of Representatives
Preceded by Thomas Montgomery Bell	Member of the U.S. House of Representatives from Georgia's 9th congressional district March 4, 1931 – January 3, 1935	Succeeded by B. Frank Whelchel
Preceded by B. Frank Whelchel	Member of the U.S. House of Representatives from Georgia's 9th congressional district January 3, 1945 – January 3, 1953	Succeeded by Phillip M. Landrum

== See also ==
- List of members of the House Un-American Activities Committee
