= 1906 Wyoming gubernatorial election =

Elections in Wyoming

- November 6, 1906
- Turnout: 29.29% of Total Population ▼4.11
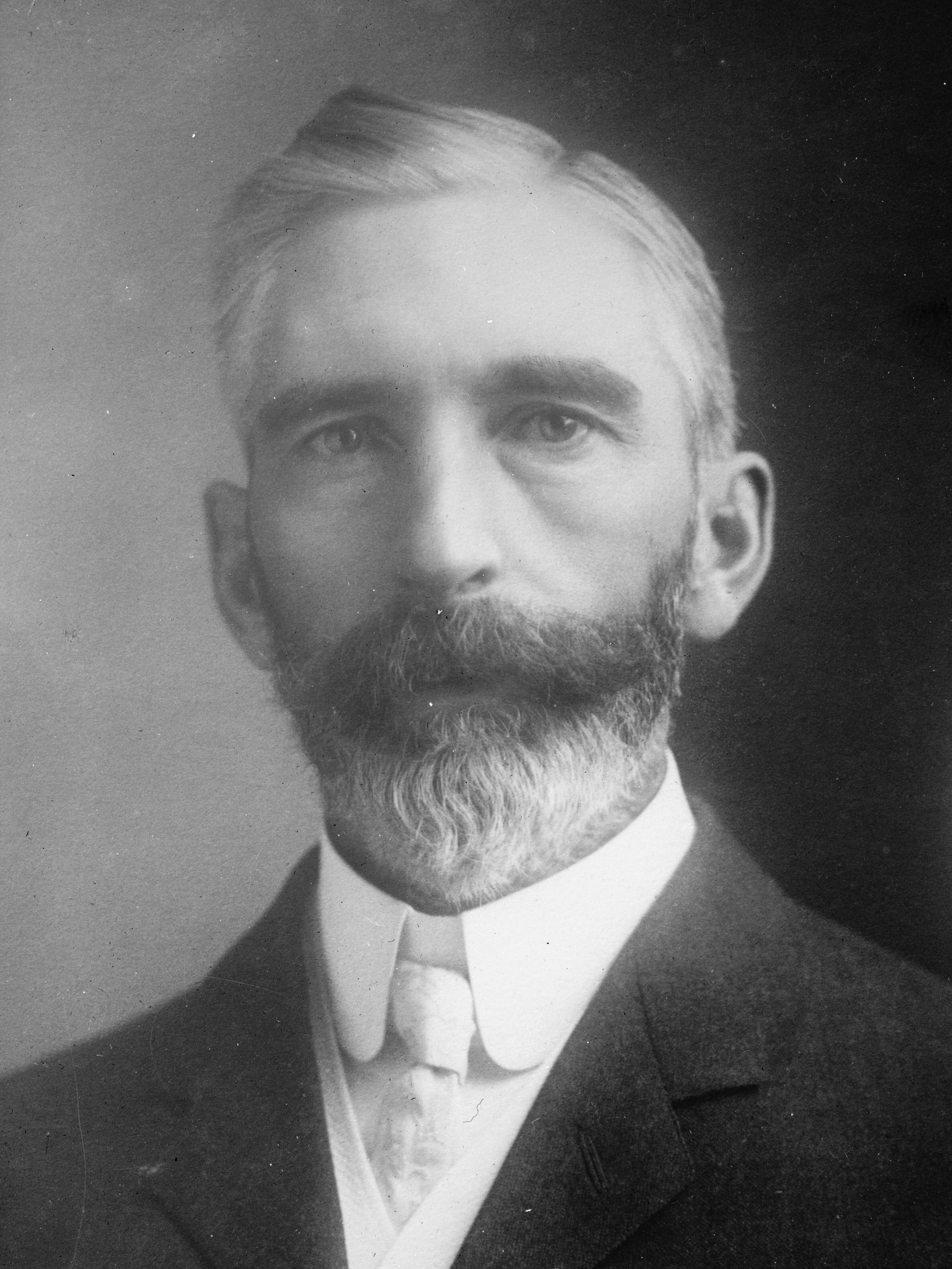

Nominee	Bryant Butler Brooks	Stephen A. D. Keister
Party	Republican	Democratic
Popular vote	16,317	9,444
Percentage	60.20%	34.85%
- County results Brooks: 50–60% 60–70% 70–80% Keister: 60–70%
Governor before election
Bryant Butler Brooks
Republican
Elected Governor
Bryant Butler Brooks
Republican

The 1906 Wyoming gubernatorial election was held on November 6, 1906. Incumbent Republican Governor Bryant B. Brooks ran for re-election to a second term. After winning renomination against some intraparty challengers, he faced State Senator Stephen Keister in the general election. Brooks was ultimately able to win re-election by an overwhelming margin, setting a record for the largest majority in a state gubernatorial election, which would not be exceeded until Governor Stanley Hathaway's re-election in 1970.

== Party conventions ==
As the Republican convention began on August 29, 1906, Governor Brooks was seen as a heavy favorite for renomination, but several challengers to Brooks emerged, including State Treasurer William C. Irvine, banker Thomas A. Cosgriff, and L. G. Phelps. Despite the strong challenges, however, Brooks was renominated.

As the Democratic convention began on September 13, 1906, Democratic leaders reported that they had "difficulty finding prominent democrats willing to take places on the ticket," with State Senator Stephen Keister named as the likeliest candidate for Governor. Keister was ultimately nominated, and the Democratic Party adopted a platform endorsing William Jennings Bryan as a candidate for president in 1908 and supporting the direct election of U.S. Senators.

== General election ==
=== Results ===
1906 Wyoming gubernatorial election
Party	Candidate	Votes	%	±%
Republican	Bryant B. Brooks (inc.)	16,317	60.20%	+2.73%
Democratic	Stephen A. D. Keister	9,444	34.84%	−4.42%
Socialist	William L. O'Neill	1,236	4.56%	—
Independent	George W. Blain	106	0.39%	—
Majority		6,873	25.36%	+7.15%
Turnout		27,103	100.00%	
Republican hold				

=== Results by county ===
County	Brooks	Votes	Keister	Votes	O'Neill	Votes	Blain	Votes
Uinta	59.34%	2,259	28.24%	1,075	12.19%	465	0.24%	9
Big Horn	66.00%	1,807	32.18%	881	1.57%	43	0.26%	7
Fremont	35.51%	722	62.52%	1,271	1.43%	29	0.54%	11
Sweetwater	59.83%	1,010	32.46%	548	7.41%	125	0.30%	5
Sheridan	54.92%	1,411	37.02%	951	7.82%	201	0.23%	6
Johnson	56.54%	666	42.44%	500	0.93%	11	0.08%	1
Natrona	63.00%	664	37.00%	390	0.00%	0	0.00%	0
Carbon	65.82%	1,579	30.47%	548	3.50%	84	0.21%	5
Crook	64.40%	747	31.29%	363	4.05%	47	0.26%	3
Weston	70.18%	633	29.16%	263	0.55%	5	0.11%	1
Converse	68.57%	1,023	27.95%	417	1.27%	19	2.21%	33
Albany	57.45%	1,342	32.83%	767	8.73%	204	0.98%	23
Laramie	65.49%	2,454	34.45%	1,287	0.11%	4	0.05%	2
