= 1890 United States House of Representatives election in Wyoming =

1890 United States House of Representatives elections in Wyoming
- September 11, 1890
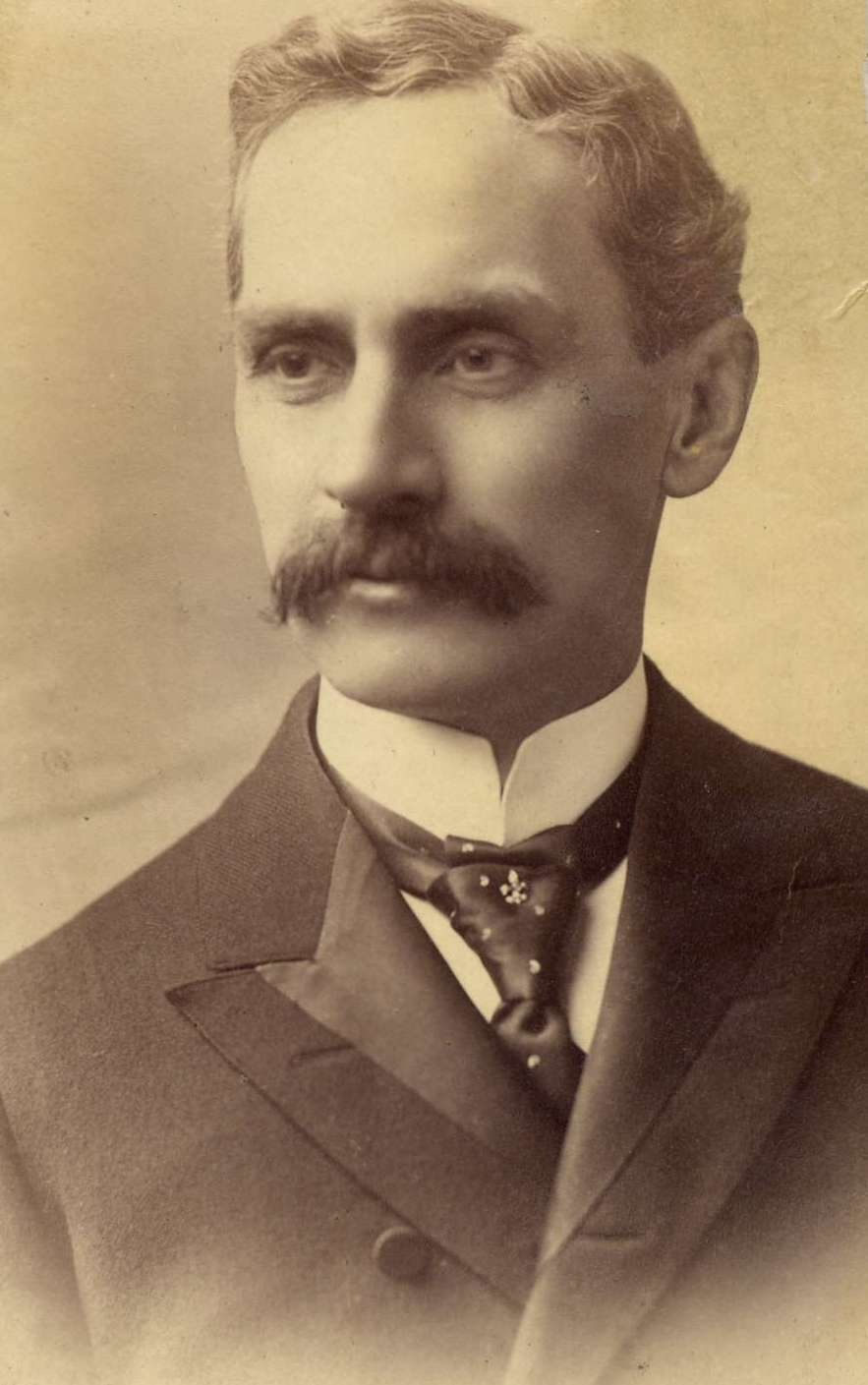

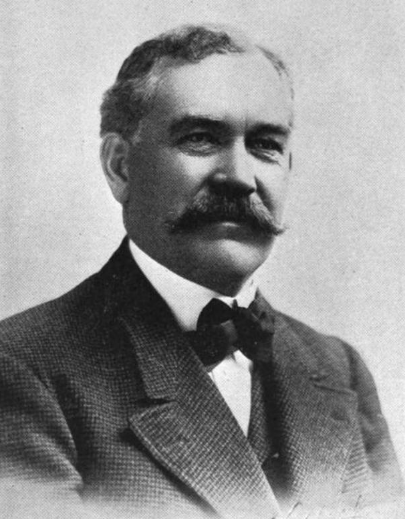
Nominee	Clarence D. Clark	George T. Beck
Party	Republican	Democratic
Popular vote	8,751	6,219
Percentage	58.46%	41.54%
Elected U.S. Representative
Clarence D. Clark
Republican

There were two United States House of Representatives elections in Wyoming in 1890, both held on September 11, 1890. The first was for the 51st United States Congress, with a term expiring on March 4, 1891; this election was necessary due to Wyoming's admittance to the Union as the 44th state earlier in 1890. The second election was for the full term in the 52nd United States Congress beginning on March 4, 1891. Republican lawyer Clarence D. Clark defeated Democratic George T. Beck with about 58% of the vote in both elections and became the first person to represent Wyoming in the House of Representatives.

== Results ==
1890 United States House of Representatives election in Wyoming (51st Congress)
Party	Candidate	Votes	%
Republican	Clarence D. Clark	9,087	58.22%
Democratic	George T. Beck	6,520	41.78%
Total votes		15,607	100%

1890 United States House of Representatives election in Wyoming (52nd Congress)
Party	Candidate	Votes	%
Republican	Clarence D. Clark	8,751	58.46%
Democratic	George T. Beck	6,219	41.54%
Total votes		14,970	100%
