= Farish Tate =

American politician

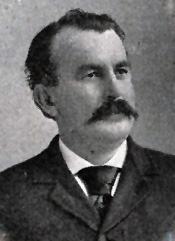

United States Attorney for the Northern District of Georgia
- In office 1905–1913
- President: Theodore Roosevelt; William Howard Taft

Member of the U.S. House of Representatives from Georgia's 9th district
- In office March 4, 1893 – March 3, 1905
- Preceded by: Thomas E. Winn
- Succeeded by: Thomas Montgomery Bell

Member of the Georgia House of Representatives
- In office 1882–1897

Personal details
- Born: Farish Carter Tate; November 20, 1856 Jasper, Georgia, U.S.
- Died: February 7, 1922 (aged 65) Jasper, Georgia, U.S.
- Party: Democratic
- Education: North Georgia Agricultural College

Farish Carter Tate (November 20, 1856 – February 7, 1922) was an American attorney and politician who served as a member of the United States House of Representatives for Georgia's 9th Congressional District from 1893 to 1905.

== Early life and education ==
Tate was born in Jasper, Georgia, in 1856. He attended North Georgia Agricultural College in Dahlonega. He studied law, gained admittance to the state bar in 1880 and became a practicing attorney in Jasper.

== Career ==
In 1882, Tate was elected to the Georgia House of Representatives, and he served in that body until 1897. During that time, he also served on the Democratic State Executive Committee from 1884 through 1887. He served on that same committee again from 1890 to 1892. In addition, he served as a delegate to the 1888 Georgia Democratic Convention.

After to Georgia's 9th congressional district in the 53rd United States Congress, Tate was re-elected to five additional terms in that seat until losing his bid for reelection to the 59th Congress in 1904. In total, his federal congressional service spanned from March 4, 1893, through March 3, 1905.

After being appointed as a United States attorney in the Northern District of Georgia by President Theodore Roosevelt in 1905, Tate was reappointed to that position by President Howard Taft and served in that post until 1913. He then returned to Jasper to continue practicing law.

== Personal life ==
Tate married Julia Lester Bell in 1881 and fathered four children (Howard, Farish III, Virginia, and Julia) with her from 1884 to 1893, though Farish III died in infancy. Tate died in Jasper on February 7, 1922, and was buried in the Tate family cemetery.

U.S. House of Representatives
Preceded by Thomas E. Winn	Member of the U.S. House of Representatives from Georgia's 9th congressional district March 4, 1893 – March 3, 1905	Succeeded by Thomas Montgomery Bell
