= George T. Beck =

American politician

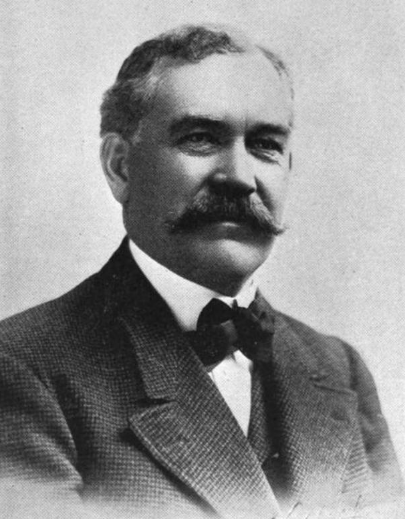

Member of the Wyoming Senate
- In office 1913–1917

Mayor of Cody, Wyoming
- In office 1902–1903
- Preceded by: Frank L. Houx

Personal details
- Born: George Washington Thornton Beck; June 26, 1856 Lexington, Kentucky, U.S.
- Died: December 1, 1943 (aged 87) Cody, Wyoming, U.S.
- Party: Democratic
- Spouse: Daisy Mae Sorrenson
- Parents: James B. Beck (father); Jane Augusta Washington Thornton (mother)

George Washington Thornton Beck (June 26, 1856 – December 1, 1943) was a politician and business entrepreneur in the U.S. state of Wyoming.

== Life ==
George Washington Thornton Beck was born on June 26, 1856, in Lexington, Kentucky, to Senator James B. Beck and Jane Augusta Washington Thornton. In 1877 he moved to Leadville, Colorado, during the Colorado Silver Boom and then worked for the Northern Pacific Railway in the Dakota Territory in 1878 before moving to Sheridan, Wyoming Territory in 1879. In 1884 he constructed his first flour mill in Beckton and then built another flour mill and electric plant in 1886. From 1892 to 1894 he operated the Sheridan Fuel Company.

Beck, Horace C. Alger, and later investors, including William F. "Buffalo Bill" Cody, George Bliestein, Bronson Rumsey, and Nate Salsbury founded the Shoshone Land and Irrigation Company to build a canal and irrigate land in the Big Horn Basin. The partners claimed land under the Carey Act project, hoping to bring in settlers and profit by selling water rights. The investors utilized the celebrity of William F. "Buffalo Bill" Cody, naming the town they founded Cody, Wyoming, as well as the canal, after him.

As the most directly involved in the day-to-day operations, Beck lived in Cody, Wyoming, and guided the town in its infancy. Along with other business leaders, Beck was vital in founding The Cody Club, which would become The Cody Country Chamber of Commerce. There is a street named in his honor in Cody.

From 1889 to 1890 he served as the last president of the Wyoming Territorial Council and was the Democratic nominee for Wyoming's first House election, but was defeated by Clarence D. Clark. He was elected to the territorial Senate and the Wyoming State Senate as a Democrat. In 1901 he ran for mayor of Cody in its first mayoral election, but was defeated by Frank L. Houx. In 1902 he ran for mayor again and was elected and later that year ran for the Democratic nomination for the 1902 gubernatorial election and on August 7, 1902, he received the Democratic nomination for governor, but was defeated in a landslide by Governor DeForest Richards. He later served as a delegate to the 1904 and 1908 Democratic National Conventions

On December 2, 1943, he died in his home in Cody, Wyoming from a heart attack.

== Electoral history ==
1902 Wyoming Gubernatorial election
Party	Candidate	Votes	%	±%
Republican	DeForest Richards (incumbent)	14,483	57.81%	+5.38
Democratic	George T. Beck	10,017	39.98%	−5.40%
Socialist	Henry Breitenstein	552	2.20%	+2.20
Total votes		25,052	100.00%	

Party political offices
Preceded by Horace C. Alger	Democratic nominee for Governor of Wyoming; 1902	Succeeded by John Eugene Osborne
