= 1894 Wyoming state elections =

A general election was held in the U.S. state of Wyoming on Tuesday, November 6, 1894. All of the state's executive officers—the Governor, Secretary of State, Auditor, Treasurer, and Superintendent of Public Instruction—were up for election. The Republican Party, helped by the strong performance of the Populist Party, which operated as a spoiler to the Democratic Party, won back the governorship and improved its margin of victory in all other statewide offices.

== Governor ==
Incumbent Democratic Governor John E. Osborne, first elected in the 1892 special election, declined to run for a second term. Republican nominee William A. Richards, the Surveyor General of Wyoming, defeated State Senator William H. Holliday by a wide margin.

1894 Wyoming gubernatorial election
| Party | Candidate | Votes | % | ±% |
|---|---|---|---|---|
| Republican | William A. Richards | 10,149 | 52.61% | +9.10% |
| Democratic | William H. Holliday | 6,965 | 36.11% | −17.73% |
| Populist | Lewis C. Tidball | 2,176 | 11.28% | — |
| Majority | | 3,184 | 16.51% | +6.18% |
| Turnout | | 19,290 | 100.00% | |
| Republican gain from Democratic | | | | |

== Secretary of State ==
Incumbent Republican Secretary of State Amos W. Barber, who served as acting Governor for several years following the resignation of Governor Francis E. Warren, declined to run for re-election as Secretary of State. State Auditor Charles W. Burdick was nominated at the Republican convention to run as Barber's successor. He faced Democratic nominee Caleb P. Organ, a former member of the Territorial Council and the 1888 Democratic nominee for Congress from the Wyoming Territory's at-large congressional district, and Populist nominee David W. Elliott. Burdick handily defeated both.

=== General election ===
==== Results ====
1894 Wyoming Secretary of State election
| Party | Candidate | Votes | % | ±% |
|---|---|---|---|---|
| Republican | Charles W. Burdick | 10,186 | 53.74% | −1.83% |
| Democratic | Caleb P. Organ | 6,397 | 33.75% | −10.68% |
| Populist | David W. Elliott | 2,370 | 12.50% | — |
| Majority | | 3,789 | 19.99% | +8.85% |
| Turnout | | 18,953 | 100.00% | |
| Republican hold | | | | |

== Auditor ==
Incumbent State Auditor Charles W. Burdick opted to run for Secretary of State rather than seeking a second term as Auditor. Republican William O. Owen, the former Albany County Surveyor, was nominated by the Republican convention as Burdick's successor. He faced Democratic nominee James M. Fenwick, the Clerk of the Second Judicial District Court, and Populist nominee John F. Pierce in the general election. Owen easily defeated both to win his first and only term as State Auditor.

=== General election ===
==== Results ====
1894 Wyoming Auditor election
| Party | Candidate | Votes | % | ±% |
|---|---|---|---|---|
| Republican | William O. Owen | 9,986 | 52.57% | −2.09% |
| Democratic | James M. Fenwick | 6,569 | 34.58% | −10.76% |
| Populist | John F. Pierce | 2,441 | 12.85% | — |
| Majority | | 3,417 | 17.99% | +8.68% |
| Turnout | | 18,996 | 100.00% | |
| Republican hold | | | | |

== Treasurer ==
Incumbent Republican Treasurer Otto Gramm was unable to seek re-election as Treasurer due to term limits, creating an open seat. Banker Henry G. Hay won the Republican nomination to succeed Gramm, George Bolin, a Douglas businessman, was nominated by the Democratic convention as Hay's opponent. Hay defeated both Bolin and Populist nominee Wilbur F. Williams in a landslide.

=== General election ===
==== Results ====
1894 Wyoming Treasurer election
| Party | Candidate | Votes | % | ±% |
|---|---|---|---|---|
| Republican | Henry G. Hay | 10,102 | 53.03% | −3.48% |
| Democratic | George Bolin | 6,489 | 34.06% | −9.42% |
| Populist | Wilbur F. Williams | 2,458 | 12.90% | — |
| Majority | | 3,613 | 18.97% | +5.94% |
| Turnout | | 19,049 | 100.00% | |
| Republican hold | | | | |

== Superintendent of Public Instruction ==
Republican Superintendent of Public Instruction Stephen Farwell declined to seek re-election, and Estelle Reel, the Laramie County Superintendent of Schools, was nominated as his successor by the Republican convention. Arthur J. Matthews, the superintendent of city schools in Rock Springs, was named by the Democratic convention as its candidate, and Sarah H. Rollman was nominated by the Populist Party. Reed defeated both by a sizable margin, becoming the first woman elected to statewide office in Wyoming.

=== General election ===
==== Results ====
1894 Wyoming Superintendent of Public Instruction election
| Party | Candidate | Votes | % | ±% |
|---|---|---|---|---|
| Republican | Estelle Reed | 10,831 | 56.65% | −0.08% |
| Democratic | Arthur J. Matthews | 6,373 | 33.34% | −9.93% |
| Populist | Sarah H. Rollman | 1,914 | 10.01% | — |
| Majority | | 4,458 | 23.32% | +9.86% |
| Turnout | | 19,118 | | |
| Republican hold | | | | |
