= Thomas M. Bell (Georgia politician) =

American politician (1861–1941)

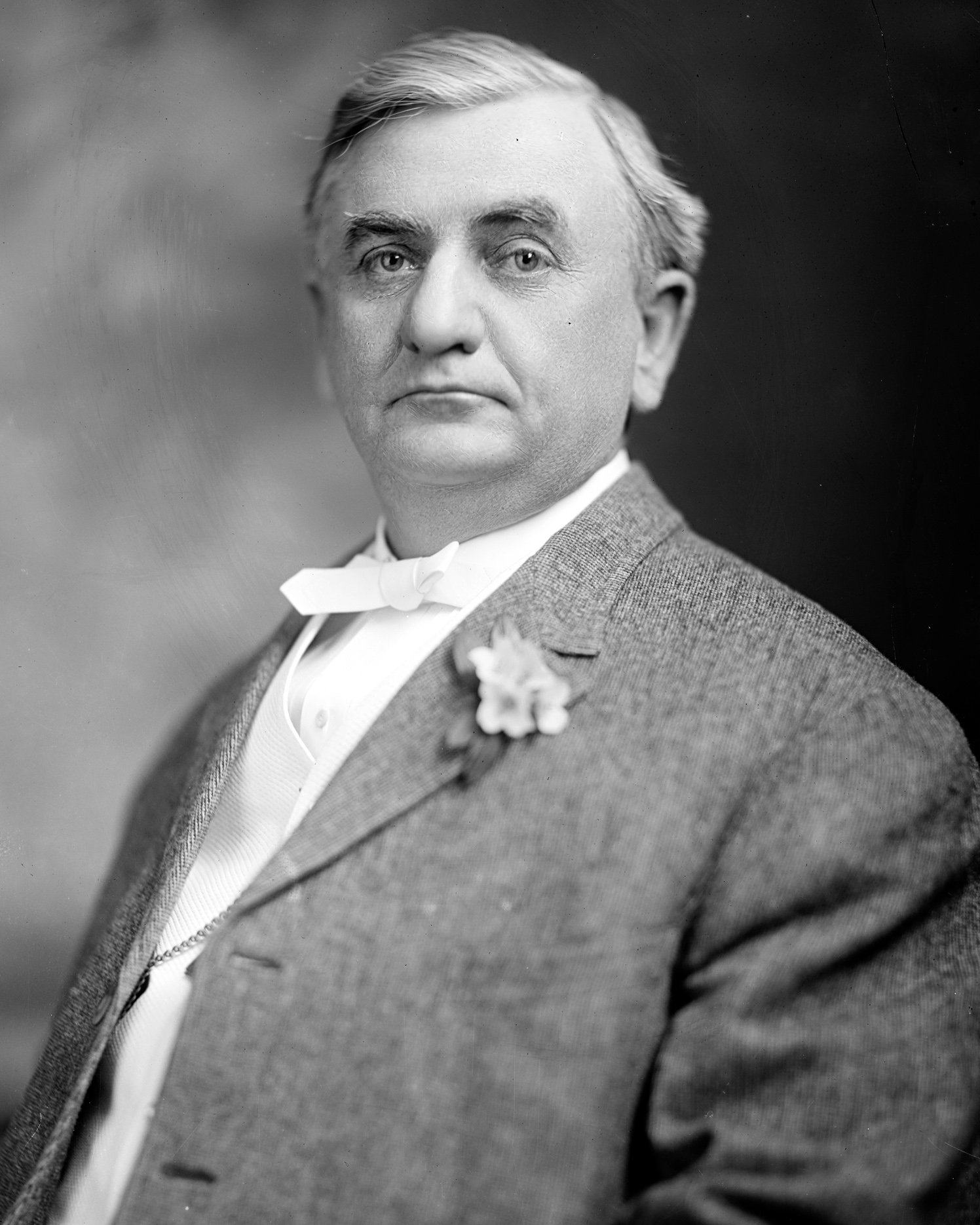
- Bell, 1905–1941

House Majority Whip
- In office 1913–1915
- Preceded by: John Wilbur Dwight
- Succeeded by: Harold Knutson

Member of the U.S. House of Representatives from Georgia's 9th district
- In office March 4, 1905 – March 3, 1931
- Preceded by: Farish Carter Tate
- Succeeded by: John Stephens Wood

Personal details
- Born: Thomas Montgomery Bell; March 17, 1861 near Cleveland, Georgia
- Died: March 18, 1941 (aged 80) Gainesville, Georgia
- Party: Democratic

Thomas Montgomery Bell (March 17, 1861 – March 18, 1941) was an American politician who served as House majority whip from 1913 to 1915.

Bell was born in Nacoochee Valley, near Cleveland, Georgia. He graduated from Moore's Business University at Atlanta, then taught public school in Cleveland from 1878 to 1879. He then worked as a traveling salesman for several years. He served as clerk of the superior court of Hall County, Georgia from 1898 to 1904, then was elected as a congress member in the Democratic Party of the United States, serving from March 4, 1905, to March 3, 1931. He served as majority whip from 1913 to 1915. In 1922, he was a prominent voice of racist opposition to anti-lynching legislation, arguing that political equality for African Americans is "something that would never be tolerated and should never be advocated by anyone." After an unsuccessful renomination in 1930, he returned to the private sector and died in Gainesville, Georgia.

U.S. House of Representatives
| Preceded by Farish Carter Tate | Member of the U.S. House of Representatives from Georgia's 9th congressional district March 4, 1905 – March 3, 1931 | Succeeded by John Stephens Wood |
Party political offices
| Preceded by John Wilbur Dwight (R-NY) (No majority (Democratic) whip 1911–1913; Dwight was Majority whip 1909–1911) | House Majority Whip; 1913–1915 | Succeeded by Harold Knutson (R-MN) (No majority (Democratic) whip 1915–1919; Knutson was whip 1919–1923) |
| Preceded by James Tilghman Lloyd (MO) (The Democrats had no whip 1909–1913; Lloyd served 1901–1908) | House Democratic Whip; 1913–1915 | Succeeded by William Allan Oldfield (AR) (The Democrats had no whip 1915–1921; Oldfield served 1921–1928) |
