= Thomas E. Winn =

American politician

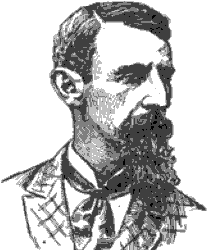

Member of the U.S. House of Representatives from Georgia's 9th district
- In office March 4, 1891 – March 3, 1893
- Preceded by: Allen D. Candler
- Succeeded by: Farish C. Tate

Personal details
- Born: Thomas Elisha Winn; May 21, 1839 Athens, Georgia, U.S.
- Died: June 5, 1925 (aged 86) Atlanta, Georgia, U.S.
- Spouse: Irene S. Park (m. 1868)
- Education: Emory and Henry College

Thomas Elisha Winn (May 21, 1839 – June 5, 1925) was an American attorney and politician who served as a member of the United States House of Representatives for Georgia's 9th congressional district from 1891 to 1893.

== Early life and education ==
Born near Athens, Georgia, Winn was the second child of Richard Dickinson and Charlotte Mitchell Winn. Winn attended Carrollton (Georgia) Masonic Institute, and graduated from Emory and Henry College. He studied law and was admitted to the bar in 1861 and commenced practice in Alpharetta, Georgia.

== Career ==
He entered the Confederate States Army as a first lieutenant in 1861. He was promoted to captain, then major, and finally a lieutenant colonel, in the Twenty-fourth Regiment, Georgia Infantry. He served with Lee's army (Army of Northern Virginia) until the close of the Civil War. After the War, he resumed his law practice in Milton County, Georgia, and served as solicitor of the county court for two years. In 1868 Winn left the law and pursued agriculture full-time, except for civic duties.

He was a Gwinnett County school commissioner from 1876 to 1890. He was a U.S. representative from Georgia representing Gwinnett County, Georgia, in the Fifty-second Congress. Winn was elected as a Democrat. He served one term from March 4, 1891, to March 3, 1893, and did not stand for reelection.

== Death ==
He died in Atlanta, Georgia, at the Confederate Soldiers' Home, on June 5, 1925, and was buried in the Ridge Grove Cemetery, near Greensboro, Georgia.

U.S. House of Representatives
Preceded by Allen D. Candler	Member of the U.S. House of Representatives from Georgia's 9th congressional district March 4, 1891 – March 3, 1893	Succeeded by Farish C. Tate
