= B. Frank Whelchel =

American politician

Benjamin Frank Whelchel

Member of the U.S. House of Representatives from Georgia's 9th district
- In office January 3, 1935 – January 3, 1945
- Preceded by: John S. Wood
- Succeeded by: John S. Wood

Personal details
- Born: December 16, 1895 Lumpkin County, Georgia
- Died: May 11, 1954 (aged 58) Gainesville, Georgia
- Party: Democratic

Benjamin Frank Whelchel (December 16, 1895 – May 11, 1954) was a U.S. representative from Georgia.

Born in Lumpkin County, near Gainesville, Georgia, Whelchel attended the public schools. He studied law privately in Gainesville, Georgia. He was admitted to the bar in 1925 and commenced the practice of law in Gainesville, Georgia. He served as judge of the city court of Hall County 1932–1934.

Whelchel was elected as a Democrat to the Seventy-fourth and to the four succeeding Congresses (January 3, 1935 – January 3, 1945). He was not a candidate for renomination in 1944. He resumed the practice of law. He died in Gainesville, Georgia, May 11, 1954. He was interred in West View Abbey, Atlanta, Georgia.

U.S. House of Representatives
| Preceded by John S. Wood | Member of the U.S. House of Representatives from Georgia's 9th congressional district January 3, 1935 – January 3, 1945 | Succeeded by John S. Wood |
