= 1898 Wisconsin lieutenant gubernatorial election =

- November 8, 1898
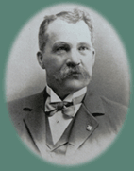

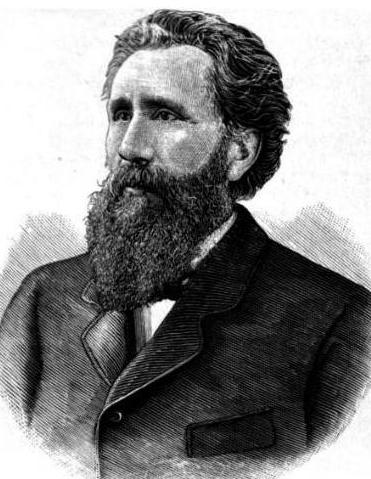
Nominee	Jesse Stone	Peter V. Deuster
Party	Republican	Democratic
Popular vote	180,038	126,306
Percentage	55.09%	38.65%
Lieutenant Governor before election
Emil Baensch
Republican
Elected Lieutenant Governor
Jesse Stone
Republican

The 1898 Wisconsin lieutenant gubernatorial election was held on November 8, 1898, in order to elect the lieutenant governor of Wisconsin. Republican nominee and incumbent member of the Wisconsin State Assembly Jesse Stone defeated Democratic nominee and former member of the U.S. House of Representatives from Wisconsin's 4th district Peter V. Deuster, People's nominee Spencer Palmer, Prohibition nominee Willis W. Cooper, Social Democratic nominee Edward P. Hassinger and Socialist Labor nominee Herman C. Gauger.

== General election ==
On election day, November 8, 1898, Republican nominee Jesse Stone won the election by a margin of 53,732 votes against his foremost opponent Democratic nominee Peter V. Deuster, thereby retaining Republican control over the office of lieutenant governor. Stone was sworn in as the 18th lieutenant governor of Wisconsin on January 2, 1899.

=== Results ===
Wisconsin lieutenant gubernatorial election, 1898
Party	Candidate	Votes	%
Republican	Jesse Stone	180,038	55.09
Democratic	Peter V. Deuster	126,306	38.65
Populist	Spencer Palmer	8,267	2.53
Prohibition	Willis W. Cooper	7,846	2.40
Social Democratic	Edward P. Hassinger	2,535	0.78
Socialist Labor	Herman C. Gauger	1,543	0.47
	Scattering	248	0.08
Total votes		326,783	100.00
Republican hold			
