= Bryant Butler Brooks =

7th Governor of Wyoming

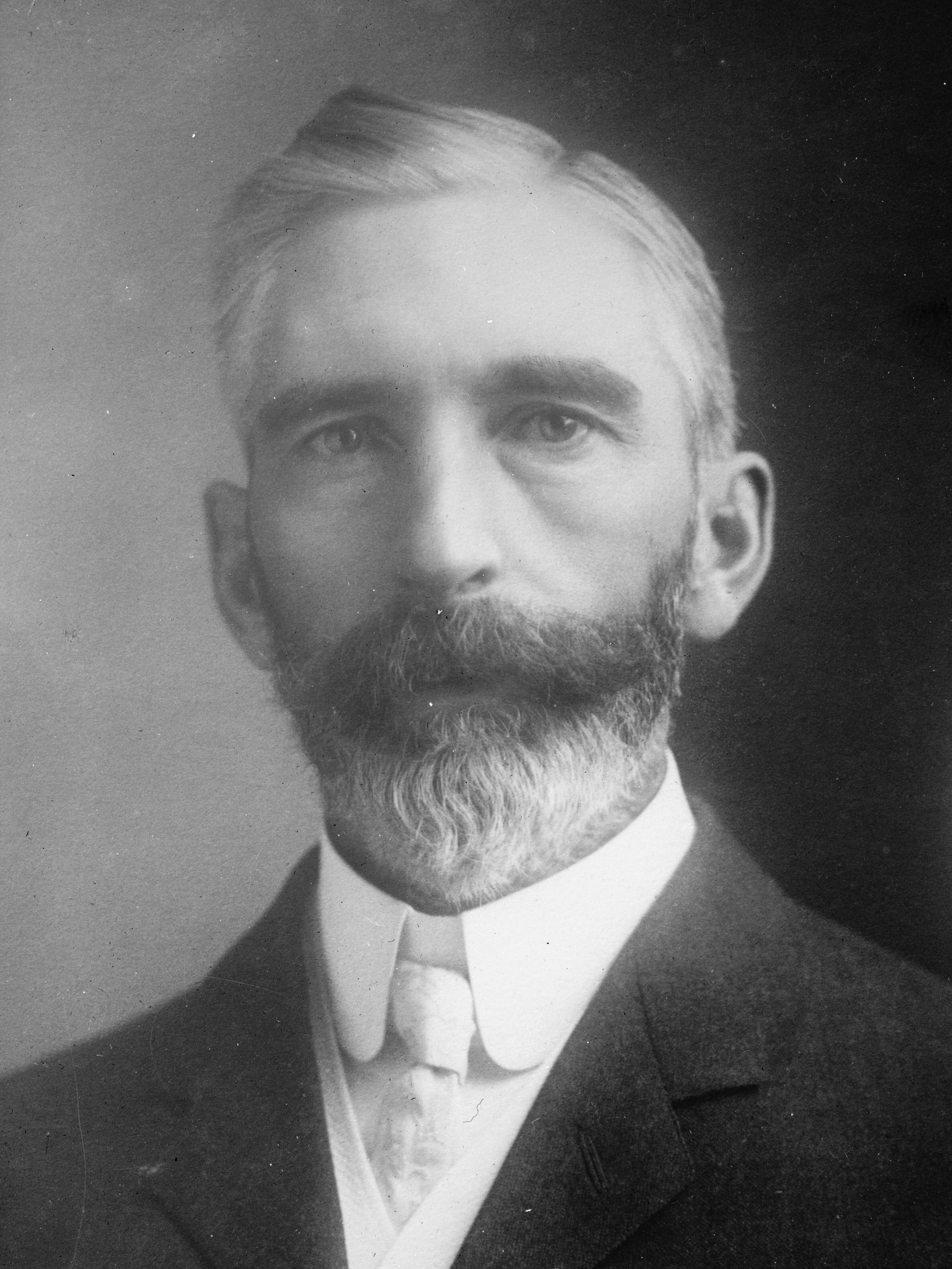

7th Governor of Wyoming
- In office January 2, 1905 – January 2, 1911
- Preceded by: Fenimore Chatterton
- Succeeded by: Joseph M. Carey

Personal details
- Born: February 5, 1861 Bernardston, Massachusetts
- Died: December 8, 1944 (aged 83) Casper, Wyoming
- Party: Republican

Bryant Butler Brooks (February 5, 1861 – December 8, 1944) was an American businessman, rancher, politician, oilman, banker and published author. He was the seventh governor of Wyoming from January 2, 1905, until January 2, 1911.

== Early life ==
Brooks was born in Bernardston, Massachusetts, to Silas Newton Brooks and Melissa Minerva Burrows. Through his mother, he was a descendant of John Ellis, a crew member of the Puritan ship Mayflower. Through his father, he was a descendant of Thomas Bascom, a founder of Windsor, Connecticut, which made him related through the Bascom family bloodlines to the mountain man and fur trapper Jedediah Smith, the western artist Frederic Remington and the famous rodeo cowboy Earl Bascom. His early American ancestors were of English, French Canadian, Scottish, Dutch and Welsh extract.

In 1871 after the devastating Great Chicago Fire, the Brooks family moved to Chicago, Illinois where Silas expanded his security lock manufacturing business, taking advantage of the demand for locks in the rebuilding of Chicago.

== Career ==
After attending a business college in Chicago, Bryant headed west to Alexandria, Nebraska to work on a ranch and farm operation owned by his father's cousin, Judge L.D. Willard.

In the spring of 1880, he left Alexandria, taking a train to Cheyenne, Wyoming where he hired on with a cowboy crew. They rounded up cattle in Idaho along the Snake River and trailed them to the plains of Wyoming.

After the roundup and cattle drive, he returned to parent's home in Chicago to take a short course in assaying and metallurgy.

In 1881, he moved back to Wyoming where he cowboyed and trapped beaver along the Big Muddy River. At the Big Muddy, he traded six beaver traps and a sack of flour for a trapper's old sod-roofed log cabin. This began his ranching operation. With the financial backing of his father, 80 head of cattle were shipped by train from Wisconsin and trailed to the ranch. His registered cattle brand was the V Bar V.

In 1883, the trapper's one-room cabin was replaced with a modern ranch house.

On March 11, 1886, he married his second cousin Mary Naomi Willard. Bryant's paternal grandmother Mary Amelia Bascom and Mary Willard's paternal grandmother Emirancy Climena Bascom were sisters and daughters of Moses Bascom of Bascom Hollow, Massachusetts.

Bryant and Mary were married in Alexandria, Nebraska, where she was a school teacher living with parents, Judge Lockhart Dickman Willard and Olive Hester Clark.

He became active in the Republican Party, serving in the second class of the Wyoming State Legislature of 1892.

He took over from Fenimore Chatterton as Governor of Wyoming in 1905, and was re-elected in 1907. He was the first Governor to occupy the Wyoming Governor's Mansion in Cheyenne, completed in 1904.

In partnership with his brother and their father under the name of B.B. Brooks and Co., he established the Brooks Ranch north of Casper consisting of over 42,000 acres with even more ranch holdings southeast of Casper.

He served as president of the Consolidated Royalty Oil Company with its headquarters in the Oil Exchange building in Casper. He also served as president of the Wyoming National Bank. Brooks was a 33-degree Mason, as well.

He died December 8, 1944, in Casper, Wyoming, and is interred in the Highland Cemetery. He was survived by his wife Mary and their five children, four girls and one boy – Jeanie, Abby, Lena, Melissa and Silas.

His memoirs were published in 1939 under the title: Memoirs of Bryant B. Brooks: Cowboy, Trapper, Lumberman, Stockman, Oilman, Banker, and Governor of Wyoming. His official portrait was painted by artist Michele Rushworth and hangs in the state capitol in Cheyenne, Wyoming.

In 2018, Bryant Brooks, his wife Mary, their daughter Lena and her husband Mike McCleary with their son "Cactus" Bryant Bascom McCleary were all posthumously inducted into the Wyoming Cowboy Hall of Fame, honoring them for their many years of ranching.

== Legacy ==
- B.B. Brooks Ranch
- Wyoming Cowboy Hall of Fame induction 2018
- Ship Governor Brooks, a five-masted wooden schooner built by Percy & Small of Bath, Maine in 1907
- Brooks Lake Lodge and Spa, Dubois, Wyoming
- Brooks Lake in the Shoshone National Forest
- Brooks Lake Campground

Party political offices
Preceded by DeForest Richards	Republican nominee for Governor of Wyoming; 1904, 1906	Succeeded by William E. Mullen
Political offices
Preceded by Fenimore Chatterton	Governor of Wyoming; January 2, 1905 – January 2, 1911	Succeeded by Joseph M. Carey
