= 1898 San Francisco mayoral election =

- November 1, 1898
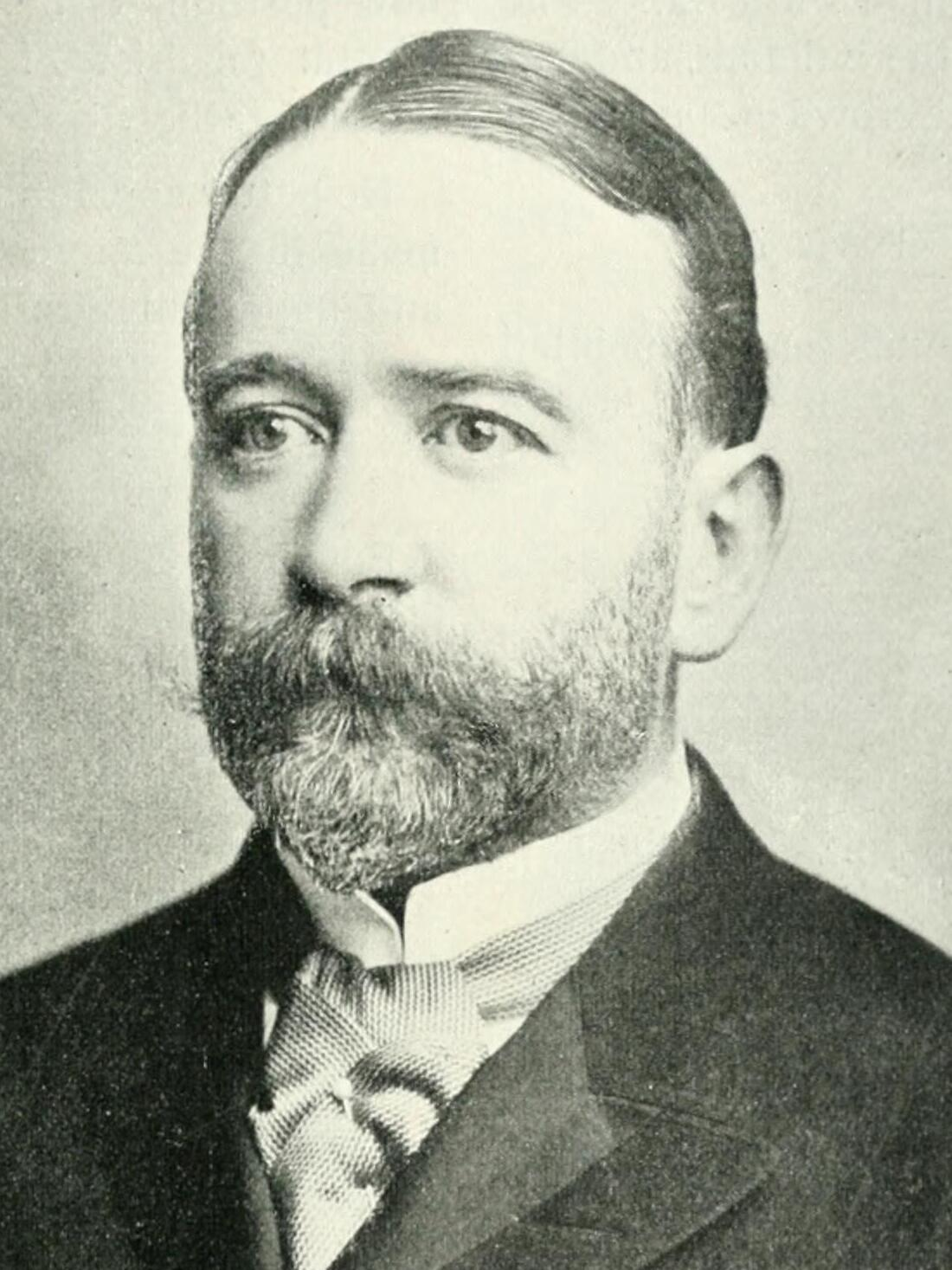

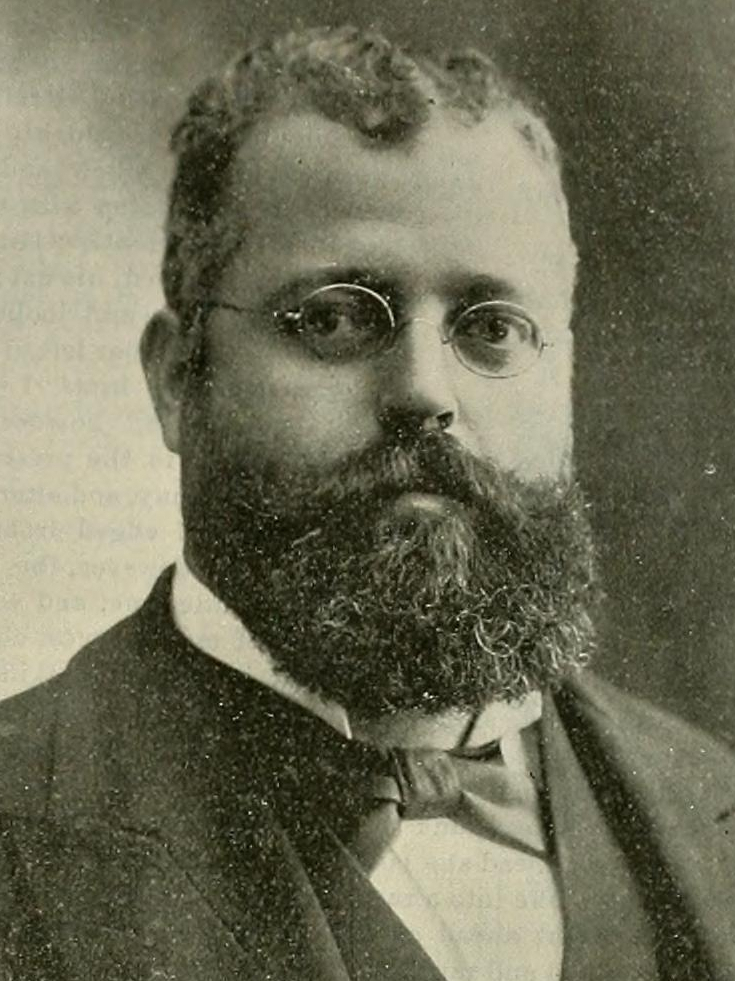
Candidate	James D. Phelan	Charles L. Patton
Party	Democratic	Republican
Popular vote	26,910	23,716
Percentage	51.91%	45.75%
Mayor before election
James D. Phelan
Democratic
Elected Mayor
James D. Phelan
Democratic

The 1898 San Francisco mayoral election was held on November 1, 1898. James D. Phelan was re-elected with 52% of the vote.

== Results ==
1898 San Francisco mayoral election
Party	Candidate	Votes	%
Democratic	James D. Phelan	26,910	51.91%
Republican	Charles L. Patton	23,716	45.75%
Socialist Labor	Oliver Everett	1,213	2.34%
Total votes		51,438	100.00
Democratic hold			
