= 1898 Los Angeles mayoral election =

- December 5, 1898
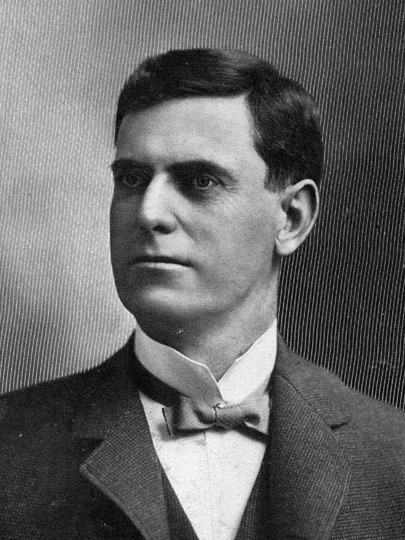

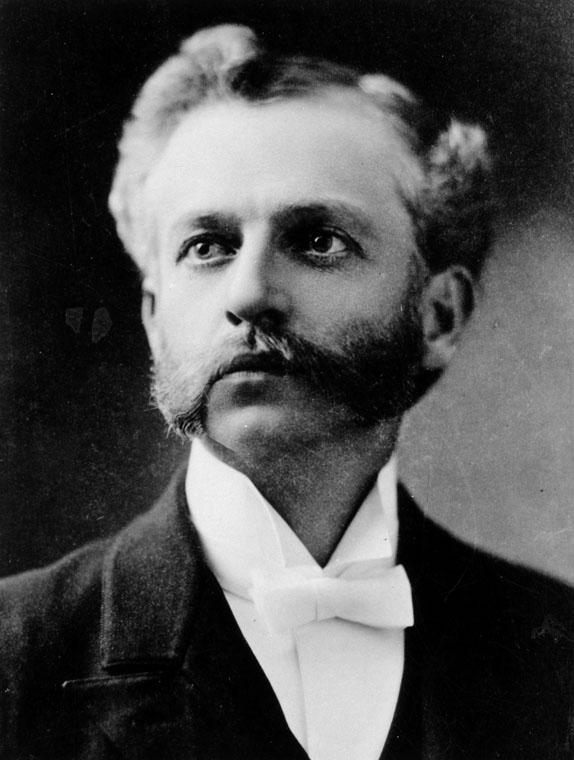
Candidate	Frederick Eaton	Meredith P. Snyder
Party	Republican	Democratic
Popular vote	8,273	7,698
Percentage	51.80%	48.20%
Mayor before election
Meredith P. Snyder
Democratic
Elected Mayor
Frederick Eaton
Republican

The 1898 Los Angeles mayoral election took place on December 5, 1898. Incumbent Meredith P. Snyder was defeated by Frederick Eaton.

== Results ==
Los Angeles mayoral general election, December 5, 1898
Party	Candidate	Votes	%	±%
Republican	Frederick Eaton	8,273	51.80%	
Democratic	Meredith P. Snyder (incumbent)	7,698	48.20%	
Total votes		15,971	100.00	
Republican gain from Democratic		Swing		
