= Alexander B. Bruce =

American politician

Alexander Bern Bruce
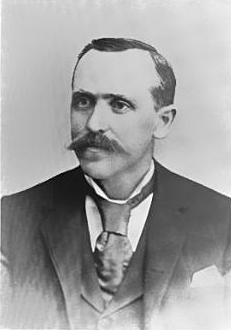

22nd Mayor of Lawrence, Massachusetts
- In office 1886–1887
- Preceded by: James R. Simpson
- Succeeded by: Alvin E. Mack

Member of the Lawrence, Massachusetts Board of Aldermen Ward 5
- In office 1884–1884

Personal details
- Born: September 17, 1853 Brechin, Scotland
- Died: 6 September 1909 (aged 55) Lawrence, Massachusetts
- Resting place: Lawrence, Massachusetts
- Party: Democratic
- Spouse(s): Mary H. Mitchell, m. 1870
- Children: David Bruce

Alexander Bern Bruce (September 17, 1853 – 1909) was a Scottish American baker and politician who served as the twenty second Mayor of Lawrence, Massachusetts.

== Personal life ==
Alexander was born on September 17, 1853, to David and Jemima (Bern) Bruce. On September 24, 1870, he married Mary Hannah Mitchell in Lawrence, Massachusetts. They had one son, David Bruce. Alexander died of typhoid fever on September 6, 1909.

== Bibliography ==
- Massachusetts of Today: A Memorial of the State, Historical and Biographical, Issued for the World's Columbian Exposition at Chicago, page 463, (1892).
- Men of progress: One thousand Biographical Sketches and Portraits of Leaders in Business and Professional life in the Commonwealth of Massachusetts, page 373, (1896).

== Footnotes ==
Party political offices
Preceded by George F. Williams	Democratic nominee for Governor of Massachusetts; 1898	Succeeded by Robert Treat Paine
Political offices
Preceded by James R. Simpson	22nd Mayor of Lawrence, Massachusetts; 1886–1897	Succeeded by Alvin E. Mack
