= 1898 Massachusetts gubernatorial election =

- November 8, 1898
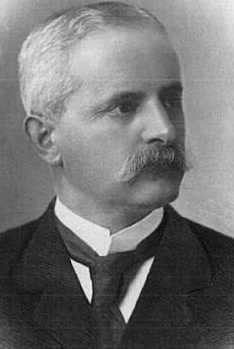

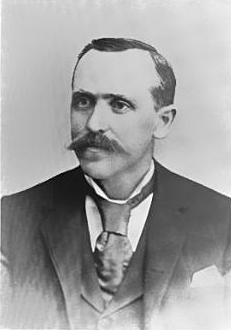
Nominee	Roger Wolcott	Alexander B. Bruce
Party	Republican	Democratic
Popular vote	191,146	107,960
Percentage	60.16%	33.98%
- Wolcott: 40-50% 50–60% 60–70% 70–80% 80–90% >90% Bruce: 40-50% 50–60%
Governor before election
Roger Wolcott
Republican
Elected Governor
Roger Wolcott
Republican

The 1898 Massachusetts gubernatorial election was held on November 8, 1898. Incumbent Republican Governor Roger Wolcott was re-elected to a third term in office, defeating Democratic former mayor of Lawrence Alexander B. Bruce.

== General election ==
=== Candidates ===
- Alexander B. Bruce, former mayor of Lawrence (Democratic)
- George R. Peare (Socialist Labor)
- Winfield P. Porter (Social Democratic)
- Samuel B. Shapleigh (Prohibition)
- Roger Wolcott, incumbent Governor since 1897 (Republican)

=== Results ===
1898 Massachusetts gubernatorial election
Party	Candidate	Votes	%	±%
Republican	Roger Wolcott (incumbent)	191,146	60.16%	▼1.03
Democratic	Alexander B. Bruce	107,960	33.98%	▲4.49
Socialist Labor	George R. Peare	10,063	3.17%	▲0.83
Prohibition	Samuel B. Shapleigh	4,734	1.49%	▼0.34
Social Democratic	Winfield P. Porter	3,749	1.18%	N/A
Write-in	All others	83	0.03%	▲0.02
Total votes		317,735	100.00%	

== See also ==
- 1898 Massachusetts legislature
