= 1898 Georgia gubernatorial election =

- October 5, 1898
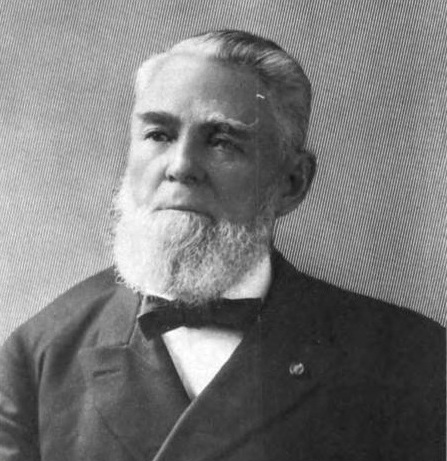

Nominee	Allen D. Candler	John R. Hogan
Party	Democratic	Populist
Popular vote	118,028	51,191
Percentage	69.75%	30.25%
Governor before election
William Yates Atkinson
Democratic
Elected Governor
Allen D. Candler
Democratic

The 1898 Georgia gubernatorial election was held on October 5, 1898, in order to elect the Governor of Georgia. Democratic nominee and incumbent Secretary of State of Georgia Allen D. Candler defeated People's Party nominee John R. Hogan.

== General election ==
On election day, October 5, 1898, Democratic nominee Allen D. Candler won the election with a margin of 66,837 votes against his opponent People's Party nominee John R. Hogan, thereby holding Democratic control over the office of Governor. Candler was sworn in as the 56th Governor of Georgia on October 29, 1898.

=== Results ===
Georgia gubernatorial election, 1898
Party	Candidate	Votes	%
Democratic	Allen D. Candler	118,028	69.75
Populist	John R. Hogan	51,191	30.25
Total votes		209,187	100.00
Democratic hold			
