= 1898 United States elections =

- ← 1896 1897 1898 1899 1900 → Midterm elections
- Election day: November 8
- Incumbent president: ▌William McKinley (R)
- Next Congress: 56th

Senate elections
- Overall control: Republican hold
- Seats contested: 30 of 90 seats
- Net seat change: Republican +8
- Results of the elections: Democratic gain Democratic hold Republican gain Republican hold Silver hold Legislature failed to elect

House elections
- Overall control: Republican hold
- Seats contested: All 357 voting seats
- Net seat change: Democratic +37

Gubernatorial elections
- Seats contested: 28
- Net seat change: Republican +1
- 1898 gubernatorial election results Democratic gain Democratic hold Republican gain Republican hold Populist hold Silver hold

Elections occurred in the middle of Republican President William McKinley's first term, during the Fourth Party System. The elections took place shortly after the Spanish–American War (April–August,1898). Members of the 56th United States Congress were chosen in this election. The Republicans retained control of both houses of Congress.

The Democrats picked up several seats in the House at the expense of the Republicans and the Populist Party. However, the Republicans continued to control the chamber with a slightly diminished majority.

In the Senate, Republicans picked up several seats at the expense of the Democrats, growing the Republican majority. Several senators continued to affiliate with third parties.

The elections helped Democrats further incorporate the remaining elements of the Populist Party, many of whom had been attracted to the Democratic Party after the 1896 candidacy of William Jennings Bryan. Republican Senate gains helped ensure ratification of the Treaty of Paris, which ended the Spanish–American War and left the US in control of Cuba, the Philippines, Guam, and Puerto Rico.

== See also ==
- 1898 United States House of Representatives elections
- 1898–99 United States Senate elections
- 1898 United States gubernatorial elections
