= George E. Abbott =

American politician

3rd Wyoming State Treasurer
- In office January 2, 1899 – January 5, 1903
- Preceded by: Henry G. Hay
- Succeeded by: Henry G. Hay

President of the Wyoming Senate
- In office 1897–1899

Wyoming State Senator from Laramie County
- In office 1903–1907
- In office 1895–1899

Personal details
- Born: November 20, 1858 Pittsfield, Illinois, U.S.
- Died: August 23, 1942 (aged 83) Cheyenne, Wyoming, U.S.

George E. Abbott (November 20, 1858 – August 23, 1942) was an American politician who served in the Wyoming Senate between 1895 and 1899 and again between 1903 and 1907 and was Wyoming State Treasurer between 1899 and 1903.

== Early life ==
Abbott was born in Pittsfield, Illinois, on November 20, 1858. Abbott moved to Wyoming in 1883.

== First Wyoming Senate stint ==
In 1894, Abbott was elected to the Wyoming Senate and was a Republican. His term began in 1895. He served during the 1895 and 1897 legislatures. During the 1897 legislature, Abbott served as President of the Wyoming Senate.

== Wyoming State Treasurer ==
On November 8, 1898, Abbott was elected Wyoming State Treasurer. His term began on January 2, 1899. The small state’s treasury grew slowly during his term, with about $300,000 in general fund expenditures every two years. His term ended on January 5, 1903.

== Second Wyoming Senate stint ==
In 1902, when his state Treasurer term expired, Abbott ran again for his State Senate seat. His term began in 1903. He served during the 1903 and 1905 legislatures. When his term expired, he retired.

== Death ==
Abbott died on August 23, 1942, in Cheyenne, Wyoming.

== Personal life ==
Abbott’s son Cary was born on April 19, 1890.
