= Fenimore Chatterton =

Governor of Wyoming from 1903 to 1905

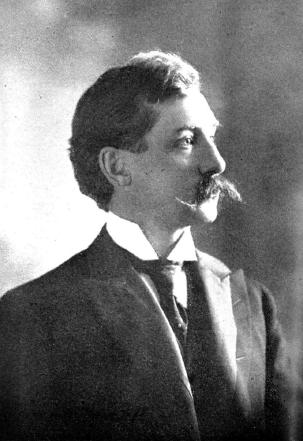

6th Governor of Wyoming
- In office April 28, 1903 – January 2, 1905
- Preceded by: DeForest Richards
- Succeeded by: Bryant Butler Brooks

3rd Secretary of State of Wyoming
- In office January 2, 1899 – January 7, 1907
- Governor: DeForest Richards; Himself; Bryan Butler Brooks
- Preceded by: Charles W. Burdick
- Succeeded by: William Schnitger

Member of the Wyoming State Legislature
- In office 1890-1893

Personal details
- Born: July 21, 1860 Oswego County, New York, U.S.
- Died: May 9, 1958 (aged 97)
- Party: Republican
- Spouse: Stella Wyland Chatterton
- Education: George Washington University; University of Michigan

Fenimore Chatterton (July 21, 1860 – May 9, 1958) was an American businessman, politician, and lawyer who served as the sixth governor of Wyoming from 1903 to 1905.

== Biography ==
Chatterton was born in Oswego County, New York, but raised in Washington, D.C. He attended the George Washington University, then Millersville State Normal School in Lancaster, Pennsylvania. In 1878, he moved to Sheridan, in Wyoming Territory, and set up as a businessman. He received a law degree from the University of Michigan in 1892. Chatterton married Stella Wyland Chatterton.

== Career ==
In 1888, he began his political career by successfully running for treasurer and probate judge of Carbon County. He served time in two classes of the Wyoming State Legislature from 1890 until 1893. He was the Wyoming Republican state chair from 1893 to 1894.

In 1898, he was elected Secretary of State, but his tenure was interrupted by the death of Governor DeForest Richards in 1903, thrusting him into the position of governor. Chatterdon served as governor from April 28, 1903, to January 2, 1905. It was during Chatterton's time as Governor that the hanging of Tom Horn occurred; it has been speculated that Chatterton's failure to win re-election as governor in 1905 was the result of his refusal to commute Horn's death sentence. Chatterton was not nominated by his party to fill the office of governor for the 1904 election, but continued to serve as Secretary of State until his term expired in 1907.

After his term as Secretary of State expired, Chatterton did not serve in public office again. He set up a private law practice, from which he retired in 1932.

== Death and legacy ==
Chatterton died on May 9, 1958, and is interred at Lakeview Cemetery in Cheyenne, Wyoming. He was an Episcopalian and a member of the Knights Templar Masonic Order.

Chatterton has been credited as the first to announce Wyoming as the official state song, during the Industrial Convention in 1903. The song was later endorsed as the official song by the state press association, state industrial convention and the state university.

Political offices
Preceded by Charles W. Burdick	Secretary of State of Wyoming; 1899-1907	Succeeded by William Schnitger
Preceded by DeForest Richards	Governor of Wyoming; April 28, 1903 – January 2, 1905	Succeeded by Bryant B. Brooks
