= 1898 Wyoming gubernatorial election =

- November 8, 1898
- Turnout: 32.62% of Total Population ▲0.84
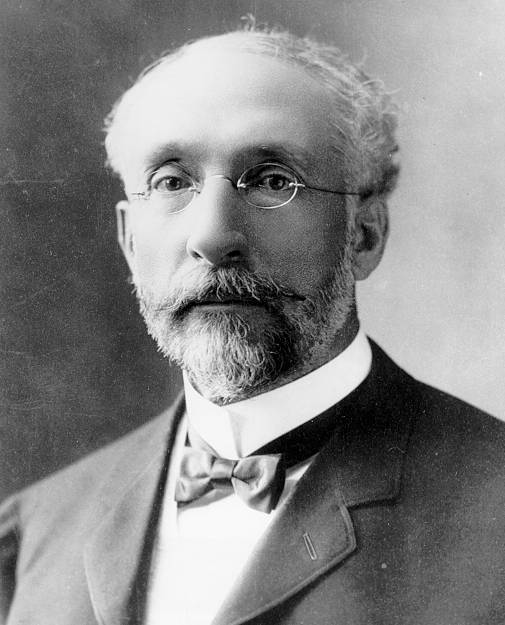

Nominee	DeForest Richards	Horace C. Alger
Party	Republican	Democratic
Popular vote	10,383	8,989
Percentage	52.43%	45.39%
- County results Richards: 40–50% 50–60% 60–70% Alger: 50–60%
Governor before election
William A. Richards
Republican
Elected Governor
DeForest Richards
Republican

The 1898 Wyoming gubernatorial election was held on November 8, 1898. Incumbent Republican Governor William A. Richards had declined to run again, so the Republican Party instead nominated DeForest Richards. The Democratic Party joined forces with the Free Silver Republicans to jointly nominate former State Representative Horace C. Alger for Governor. The Populist Party, though reduced in influence from earlier elections, nominated E. B. Viall as its candidate. Though the election was closer than 1894, owing in large part to a dramatic reduction in the share of vote received by the Populist nominee, Roberts defeated Alger by a wide margin.

== Party conventions ==
Prior to the Republican convention, until he declined to seek a second term, William A Richards was seen as one of three frontrunners, along with banker DeForest Richards and State Senator John McGill of Albany County. DeForest Richards was nominated by acclamation. The Republican platform repudiated its 1894 support for free silver, instead adopting the national Republican platform from the 1896 Republican National Convention in St. Louis.

The Democratic convention occurred as a joint affair with Free Silver Republicans, and the coalition split up the statewide candidates among the two members of the coalition; the Democrats nominated candidates for Governor, Secretary of State, and Treasurer, and Free Silver Republicans chose candidates for State Auditor and Superintendent of Public Instruction. Former State Representative Horace C. Alger was nominated by acclamation.

== General election ==
=== Results ===
1898 Wyoming gubernatorial election
Party	Candidate	Votes	%	±%
Republican	DeForest Richards	10,383	52.43%	−0.18%
Democratic	Horace C. Alger	8,989	45.39%	+9.29%
Populist	E. B. Viall	431	2.18%	−9.10%
Majority		1,394	7.04%	−9.47%
Turnout		19,803	100.00%	
Republican hold				

=== Results by county ===
County	Richards	Votes	Alger	Votes	Viall	Votes
Uinta	49.91%	1,427	49.35%	1,411	0.73%	21
Big Horn	57.83%	586	41.48%	421	2.13%	118
Fremont	56.13%	586	43.49%	454	1.40%	213
Sweetwater	53.86%	810	44.48%	669	1.66%	25
Sheridan	36.33%	607	53.86%	900	9.81%	164
Johnson	49.79%	363	48.70%	355	1.51%	11
Natrona	57.81%	418	42.19%	305	0.00%	0
Carbon	57.75%	1,221	41.91%	886	0.33%	7
Crook	51.39%	591	34.09%	392	14.52%	167
Weston	64.99%	529	34.52%	281	0.49%	4
Converse	55.63%	583	44.27%	464	0.10%	1
Albany	56.18%	1,136	43.37%	877	0.45%	9
Laramie	49.07%	1,526	50.61%	1,574	0.32%	10
