= William A. Richards =

4th Governor of Wyoming

William Alford Richards
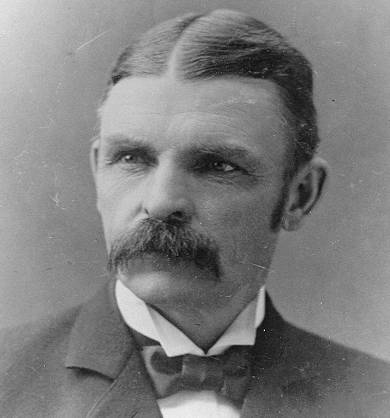

30th Commissioner of the General Land Office
- In office January 26, 1903 – January 28, 1907
- President: Theodore Roosevelt
- Preceded by: Binger Hermann
- Succeeded by: Richard A. Ballinger

4th Governor of Wyoming
- In office January 7, 1895 – January 2, 1899
- Preceded by: John Eugene Osborne
- Succeeded by: DeForest Richards

Personal details
- Born: March 9, 1849 Hazel Green, Wisconsin, U.S.
- Died: July 25, 1912 (aged 63) Melbourne, Australia
- Party: Republican
- Spouse: Harriett Hunt
- Profession: Land surveyor

William Alford Richards (March 9, 1849 – July 25, 1912) was an American surveyor, rancher, and politician who served as the fourth governor of Wyoming from 1895 to 1899 and as the 30th commissioner of the General Land Office from 1903 to 1907.

== Biography ==
Richards was born in Hazel Green, in Grant County, Wisconsin, and was educated there and in Galena, Illinois. During the Civil War, he served as an ambulance driver for the Army of the Potomac.

== Career ==
As a young man, Richards worked on surveying missions in Nebraska and first came to Wyoming in 1873 when his brother Alonzo V. Richards hired him as his general assistant while surveying the southern boundary of Wyoming Territory.

The next year, they returned for the survey of the western boundary of Wyoming. Alonzo left the expedition after 99 miles, leaving William in charge of completing the survey. William moved to California to marry Harriet Alice Hunt in 1874. The couple had three daughters. In 1885, he returned to Wyoming, homesteading a ranch in Big Horn County. In 1886, he was elected county commissioner of Johnson County, and in 1889, President Harrison appointed him Surveyor General for Wyoming.

In 1894, Richards ran for governor on the Republican ticket. He defeated William H. Holliday and Lewis C. Tidball, becoming the state's third elected governor. He served as governor from 1895 to 1899. Though he helped defuse the Jackson Hole Indian Crisis of 1895, Richards is also known for pardoning Butch Cassidy. Then a small-time rustler, Cassidy was serving a two-year term in the State Penitentiary for possession of a stolen horse worth only $5. Citizens of Fremont County, fearing Cassidy's return, asked the governor for a pardon in hopes it "would have much to do with causing him to become a law-abiding citizen," Richards wrote to a concerned rancher, Jay Torrey. Richards had interviewed Butch at the penitentiary and pardoned him after hearing reassuring words from the prisoner. Cassidy "told me that he had [had] enough of penitentiary life," Richards told Torrey, "and intended to conduct himself in such a way as to not again lay himself liable to arrest." What he may have meant was that, he intended to not again get caught.

At the conclusion of his term, he was replaced by DeForest Richards (a very distant cousin), also a Republican, and was appointed assistant commissioner of the General Land Office. William A. Richards opened the Apache, Comanche, and Wichita Indian Reservations in Oklahoma to settlement.

In 1903, Richards was appointed Commissioner of the General Land Office by President Theodore Roosevelt, serving until 1907. During his tenure, he helped save Indian ruins and other important monuments from damage and destruction by asking Edgar L. Hewett of New Mexico for a list of sites that should be protected. Hewett sent back a memorandum that listed Mesa Verde, Chaco Canyon, and many others, and Richards had it published as a circular. The memorandum was a step toward the passage of the Antiquities Act of 1906, which has been used by American presidents to set aside innumerable national monuments.

In 1909, Richards became the first Commissioner for Taxation for the state of Wyoming, holding the post until a change in administration a year later. In 1912, he traveled to Melbourne, Australia, to start a new life after the violent deaths of his daughter Edna and her husband, Thomas Jenkins.

== Death ==
Richards died of a heart attack soon after his arrival in Australia, in July 1912. He had attended an honorary banquet for his old friend Elwood Mead, former State Engineer of Wyoming, who was then in charge of developing irrigation in that country. Mead accompanied Richards's body home across the ocean. Richards is interred at Lakeview Cemetery in Cheyenne, Wyoming.

Party political offices
Preceded by Edward Ivinson	Republican nominee for Governor of Wyoming; 1894	Succeeded by DeForest Richards
Political offices
Preceded by John E. Osborne	Governor of Wyoming; January 7, 1895 – January 2, 1899	Succeeded by DeForest Richards
Preceded by Binger Hermann	Commissioner of the General Land Office; January 26, 1903 – January 28, 1907	Succeeded by Richard Achilles Ballinger
