= DeForest Richards =

5th Governor of Wyoming

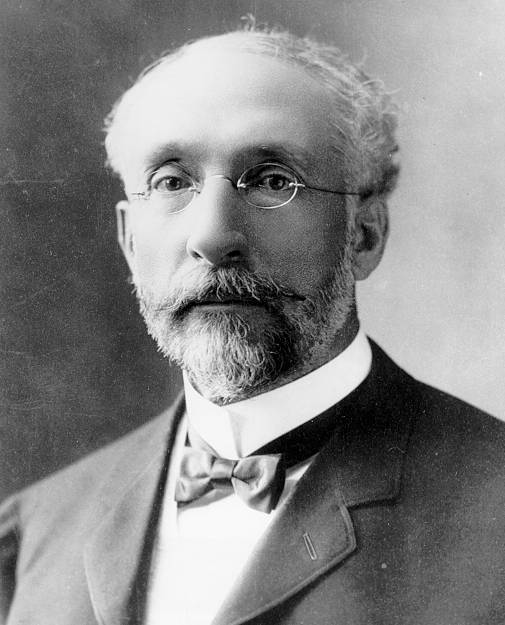

5th Governor of Wyoming
- In office January 2, 1899 – April 28, 1903
- Preceded by: William A. Richards
- Succeeded by: Fenimore Chatterton

Personal details
- Born: August 6, 1846 Charlestown, New Hampshire, U.S.
- Died: April 28, 1903 (aged 56) Cheyenne, Wyoming, U.S.
- Party: Republican
- Spouse: Elsie Jane Ingersol (m. 1871)
- Children: J. De Forest Richards

DeForest Richards (August 6, 1846 – April 28, 1903) was an American banker, farmer, and politician who served as the fifth governor of Wyoming from 1899 to 1903. A member of the Republican Party, he was the first governor to die while still in office.

== Early life ==
Born in Charlestown, New Hampshire, Richards graduated with honors from Kimball Union Academy and attended Phillips Andover Academy in Massachusetts. He was descended from families of earlier settlers, arriving in 1630 on his father's side and 1640 on his mother's. His maternal grandfather, William Jarvis, was appointed consul to Portugal by Thomas Jefferson in 1802. His father, J. DeForest Richards, was a leading Congregational minister and educator who served as President of the Alabama State University in Tuscaloosa.

In 1871, he married Elsie Jane Ingersol, an Alabama native descended from the prominent northeastern family. They had two children, a daughter and son, J. De Forest Richards.

== Career ==
Richards relocated to Alabama during post-Civil War Reconstruction, moving with his father in 1865 to run a cotton plantation. At the age of 21, he was elected to the first Alabama state legislature after Reconstruction. He was elected sheriff of Wilcox County in 1868, a position he held for four years. He retired from politics and opened a tannery, which became indebted. He reorganized the enterprise and worked as a cobbler for two years to repay his debts and accumulate capital to start a new business. He then opened a merchandising business in Camden, Alabama, where he built a "large and profitable trade," becoming a leader in the community.

In 1885, he moved to Chadron, Nebraska, where he continued his merchandising activities and acted as county treasurer.

Following his experiences in Chadron, Richards moved to Douglas, Wyoming, where he set up the mercantile firm Richards and Lidell. He also helped found the First National Bank of Douglas, of which he was the first President. Both the firm and the bank were very successful, and Richards moved on to politics, successfully running for mayor of Douglas, commanding the Wyoming National Guard, attending the Constitutional Convention that saw Wyoming Territory achieve statehood, and sitting on the Wyoming Senate.

In 1898 he ran as the Republican candidate for state Governor, and defeated Democratic candidate Horace C. Alger by 1,394 votes.

As governor, Richards advocated for reduced control of Wyoming lands by the federal government. He supported cession of federally-owned lands to the state, and opposed federal leasing of lands for grazing, preferring either state ownership or free use. At the same time, he advocated for state-run social institutions, advocating for appropriations from the state legislature for penal facilities, a home for the mentally ill, a general hospital, a school for the disabled, and a home for soldiers and sailors. He supported railroad construction, and served as a leader in a railway company that attempted to connect the Union Pacific Railroad with mining areas in Wyoming.

He ran for a second term in 1902, defeating George T. Beck by the largest margin seen since the Territory joined the Union in 1890.

== Death ==
He died from kidney disease at his home in Cheyenne on April 28, 1903, four months into his second term. Richards was a member of the Holy Royal Arch. His body is interred at Lakeview Cemetery in Cheyenne.

Party political offices
Preceded by William A. Richards	Republican nominee for Governor of Wyoming; 1898, 1902	Succeeded by Bryant Butler Brooks
Political offices
Preceded by William A. Richards	Governor of Wyoming; January 2, 1899 – April 28, 1903	Succeeded by Fenimore Chatterton
