= 1970 United States gubernatorial elections =

- November 3, 1970

37 governorships 35 states; 2 territories
| | Majority party | Minority party |
|---|---|---|
| Party | Democratic | Republican |
| Seats before | 18 | 32 |
| Seats after | 29 | 21 |
| Seat change | ▲11 | ▼11 |
| Seats up | 11 | 24 |
| Seats won | 22 | 13 |
- Republican hold Republican gain Democratic hold Democratic gain

United States gubernatorial elections were held on November 3, 1970, in 35 states and two territories. This election coincided with the Senate and the House elections.

In 1970, Arizona, New Mexico, and Wisconsin elected their governors to four-year terms for the first time, having previously elected them to two-year terms. Democrats gained 11 governorships. As of 2026, this remains the last time Democrats posted a double-digit gain of governorships, or that Republicans won the governorship of the US Virgin Islands.

== Race summary ==
| State | Governor | Party | First elected | Status | Candidates |
|---|---|---|---|---|---|
| Alabama | Albert Brewer | Democratic | 1967 (Note: Brewer became governor in 1967 after predecessor (Lurleen Wallace) died.) | Incumbent lost renomination. Democratic hold. | ▌ ✓ George Wallace (Democratic) 74.5%; ▌John L. Cashin (NDPA) 14.7%; ▌A.C. Shelton (Independent) 8.9%; ▌Jerome B. Couch (Prohibition) 1.1%; ▌Menter G. Walker (Independent) 0.4%; ▌John Watts (Whig) 0.4% |
| Alaska | Keith Miller | Republican | 1969 (Note: Miller became governor in 1969 after predecessor (Wally Hickel) resigned.) | Incumbent lost re-election. Democratic gain. | ▌ ✓ William A. Egan (Democratic) 52.4%; ▌Keith Miller (Republican) 46.1%; ▌Ralph M. Anderson (American Independent) 1.5% |
| Arizona | Jack Williams | Republican | 1966 | Incumbent re-elected. | ▌ ✓ Jack Williams (Republican) 50.9%; ▌Raúl Héctor Castro (Democratic) 49.1% |
| Arkansas | Winthrop Rockefeller | Republican | 1966 | Incumbent lost re-election. Democratic gain. | ▌ ✓ Dale Bumpers (Democratic) 61.7%; ▌Winthrop Rockefeller (Republican) 32.4%; ▌Walter L. Carruth (American) 5.9% |
| California | Ronald Reagan | Republican | 1966 | Incumbent re-elected. | ▌ ✓ Ronald Reagan (Republican) 52.8%; ▌Jesse M. Unruh (Democratic) 45.1%; ▌Ricardo Romo (Peace & Freedom) 1.0%; ▌William K. Shearer (American Independent) 1.0% |
| Colorado | John A. Love | Republican | 1962 | Incumbent re-elected. | ▌ ✓ John A. Love (Republican) 52.5%; ▌Mark Anthony Hogan (Republican) 45.2%; ▌Albert Gurule (Raza Unida) 1.8%; ▌Walter R. Plankinton (American Independent) 0.3%; ▌James Lauderdale (Socialist Workers) 0.2% |
| Connecticut | John N. Dempsey | Democratic | 1961 (Note: Dempsey took office in 1961 after predecessor (Abraham Ribicoff) resigned.) | Incumbent retired. Republican gain. | ▌ ✓ Thomas Meskill (Republican) 53.8%; ▌Emilio Daddario (Democratic) 46.2% |
| Florida | Claude R. Kirk Jr. | Republican | 1966 | Incumbent lost re-election. Democratic gain. | ▌ ✓ Reubin Askew (Democratic) 56.9%; ▌Claude R. Kirk Jr. (Republican) 43.1% |
| Georgia | Lester Maddox | Democratic | 1966 | Incumbent term-limited. Democratic hold. | ▌ ✓ Jimmy Carter (Democratic) 59.3%; ▌Hal Suit (Republican) 40.6% |
| Hawaii | John A. Burns | Democratic | 1962 | Incumbent re-elected. | ▌ ✓ John A. Burns (Democratic) 57.7%; ▌Samuel Pailthorpe King (Republican) 42.4% |
| Idaho | Don Samuelson | Republican | 1966 | Incumbent lost re-election. Democratic gain. | ▌ ✓ Cecil Andrus (Republican) 52.2%; ▌Don Samuelson (Republican) 47.8% |
| Iowa | Robert D. Ray | Republican | 1968 | Incumbent re-elected. | ▌ ✓ Robert D. Ray (Republican) 51.0%; ▌ Robert D. Fulton (Democratic) 46.6%; ▌Robert Dilley (American Independent) 2.4% |
| Kansas | Robert Docking | Democratic | 1966 | Incumbent re-elected. | ▌ ✓ Robert Docking (Democratic) 54.3%; ▌Kent Frizzell (Republican) 44.7%; ▌P. Everett Sperry (Conservative) 0.6%; ▌Marshall Uncapher (Prohibition) 0.4% |
| Maine | Kenneth M. Curtis | Democratic | 1966 | Incumbent re-elected. | ▌ ✓ Kenneth M. Curtis (Democratic) 50.14%; ▌James S. Erwin (Republican) 49.86% |
| Maryland | Marvin Mandel | Democratic | 1969 (Note: Mandel became governor in 1969 after predecessor (Spiro Agnew) resigned.) | Incumbent elected to full term. | ▌ ✓ Marvin Mandel (Democratic) 65.7%; ▌Charles Stanley Blair (Republican) 32.4%; ▌Robert Woods Merkle Jr. (American) 2.0% |
| Massachusetts | Francis Sargent | Republican | 1969 (Note: Sargent became governor in 1969 after predecessor (John A. Volpe) resigned.) | Incumbent elected to full term. | ▌ ✓ Francis Sargent (Republican) 56.7%; ▌ Kevin White (Democratic) 42.8%; ▌Henning A. Blomen (Socialist Labor) 0.4%; ▌John C. Hedges (Prohibition) 0.2% |
| Michigan | William Milliken | Republican | 1969 (Note: Milliken became governor in 1969 after predecessor (George W. Romney) resigned.) | Incumbent elected to full term. | ▌ ✓ William Milliken (Republican) 50.4%; ▌Sander Levin (Democratic) 48.7%; ▌James L. McCormick (American Independent) 0.7%; ▌George Bouse (Socialist Workers) 0.1%; ▌James Horvath (Socialist Labor) 0.1% |
| Minnesota | Harold LeVander | Republican | 1966 | Incumbent retired. Democratic gain. | ▌ ✓ Wendell R. Anderson (DFL) 54.0%; ▌Douglas M. Head (Republican) 45.5%; ▌Karl H. Heck (Industrial Government) 0.4%; ▌Jack O. Kirkham (write-in) (Independent) 0.1% |
| Nebraska | Norbert Tiemann | Republican | 1966 | Incumbent lost re-election. Democratic gain. | ▌ ✓ J. James Exon (Democratic) 53.8%; ▌Norbert Tiemann (Republican) 43.8%; ▌Albert C. Walsh (American) 2.4% |
| Nevada | Paul Laxalt | Republican | 1966 | Incumbent retired. Democratic gain. | ▌ ✓ Mike O'Callaghan (Democratic) 48.1%; ▌Edward Fike (Republican) 43.8%; ▌Charles E. Springer (Independent) 4.4%; ▌Daniel M. Hansen (Ind. American) 3.7% |
| New Hampshire | Walter R. Peterson Jr. | Republican | 1968 | Incumbent re-elected. | ▌ ✓ Walter R. Peterson Jr. (Republican) 46.0%; ▌ Roger J. Crowley (Democratic) 44.1%; ▌Meldrim Thomson Jr. (American) 9.9% |
| New Mexico | David Cargo | Republican | 1966 | Incumbent term-limited. Democratic gain. | ▌ ✓ Bruce King (Democratic) 51.3%; ▌Pete Domenici (Republican) 46.4%; ▌ John A. Salazar (Independent NM) 1.6%; ▌ Wilfredo Sedillo (People's Constitutional) 0.8% |
| New York | Nelson Rockefeller | Republican | 1958 | Incumbent re-elected. | ▌ ✓ Nelson Rockefeller (Republican) 52.4%; ▌Arthur Goldberg (Democratic) 40.3%; ▌Paul Adams (Conservative) 7.0%; ▌Rasheed Storey (Communist) 0.1%; ▌Clifton DeBerry (Socialist Workers) 0.1%; ▌Stephen Emery (Socialist Labor) 0.1% |
| Ohio | Jim Rhodes | Republican | 1962 | Incumbent term-limited. Democratic gain. | ▌ ✓ John J. Gilligan (Democratic) 54.2%; ▌Roger Cloud (Republican) 43.4% |
| Oklahoma | Dewey F. Bartlett | Republican | 1966 | Incumbent lost re-election. Democratic gain. | ▌ ✓ David Hall (Democratic) 48.42%; ▌Dewey F. Bartlett (Republican) 48.11%; ▌Reuel Little (American) 3.48% |
| Oregon | Tom McCall | Republican | 1966 | Incumbent re-elected. | ▌ ✓ Tom McCall (Republican) 55.6%; ▌Robert W. Straub (Democratic) 44.2%; ▌Doug McCall (write-in) 0.2% |
| Pennsylvania | Raymond P. Shafer | Republican | 1966 | Incumbent retired. Democratic gain. | ▌ ✓ Milton Shapp (Democratic) 55.2%; ▌Raymond J. Broderick (Republican) 41.7%; ▌Andrew J. Watson (Constitutional) 2.3%; ▌Francis McGeever (American Independent) 0.6%; ▌George S. Taylor (Socialist Labor) 0.1%; ▌Clarissa Cain (Consumer) 0.1%; ▌Pearl Cherlov (Socialist Workers) 0.1% |
| Rhode Island | Frank Licht | Democratic | 1968 | Incumbent re-elected. | ▌ ✓ Frank Licht (Democratic) 50.07%; ▌Herbert F. DeSimone (Republican) 49.53%; ▌John E. Powers (Socialist Workers) 0.4% |
| South Carolina | Robert Evander McNair | Democratic | 1965 (Note: McNair became governor in 1965 when his predecessor (Donald S. Russell) resigned.) | Incumbent term-limited. Democratic hold. | ▌ ✓ John C. West (Democratic) 51.7%; ▌Albert Watson (Republican) 45.6%; ▌A.W. Bethea (Independent) 2.0%; ▌Thomas D. Broadwater (write-in) 0.7% |
| South Dakota | Frank Farrar | Republican | 1968 | Incumbent lost re-election. Democratic gain. | ▌ ✓ Richard F. Kneip (Democratic) 54.9%; ▌Frank Farrar (Republican) 45.2% |
| Tennessee | Buford Ellington | Democratic | 1966 | Incumbent term-limited. Republican gain. | ▌ ✓ Winfield Dunn (Republican) 52.0%; ▌John Jay Hooker (Democratic) 46.0%; ▌Douglas L. Heinsohn (American) 2.1% |
| Texas | Preston Smith | Democratic | 1966 | Incumbent re-elected. | ▌ ✓ Preston Smith (Democratic) 53.4%; ▌Paul Eggers (Republican) 46.6% |
| Vermont | Deane C. Davis | Republican | 1968 | Incumbent re-elected. | ▌ ✓ Deane C. Davis (Republican) 57.0%; ▌Leo O'Brien Jr. (Democratic) 43.0% Others 0.03% |
| Wisconsin | Warren P. Knowles | Republican | 1964 | Incumbent retired. Democratic gain. | ▌ ✓ Patrick Lucey (Democratic) 54.2%; ▌Jack B. Olson (Republican) 44.9%; ▌Leo James McDonald (American) 0.7%; ▌Georgia Cozzini (Independent) 0.1%; ▌Samuel K. Hunt (Independent) 0.1%; ▌Myrtle Kastner (Independent) 0.1% |
| Wyoming | Stanley K. Hathaway | Republican | 1966 | Incumbent re-elected. | ▌ ✓ Stanley K. Hathaway (Republican) 62.8%; ▌John J. Rooney (Democratic) 37.2% |

=== Territories ===
| Territory | Incumbent | Party | First elected | Result | Candidates |
|---|---|---|---|---|---|
| Guam | Office created. | | | First governor elected. Republican gain. | ▌ ✓ Carlos Camacho (Republican) 55.8%; ▌Ricardo Bordallo (Democratic) 44.2% |
| U.S. Virgin Islands | Office created. | | | First governor elected. Republican gain. | ▌ ✓ Melvin H. Evans (Republican) 52.5%; ▌Cyril King (Independent) 47.5% |

== Closest races ==
States where the margin of victory was under 1%:

1. Maine, 0.28%
2. Oklahoma, 0.31%
3. Rhode Island, 0.54%

States where the margin of victory was under 5%:

1. Michigan, 1.67%
2. Arizona, 1.78%
3. New Hampshire, 1.89%
4. Nevada, 4.29%
5. Iowa, 4.36%
6. Idaho, 4.44%
7. New Mexico, 4.89%

States where the margin of victory was under 10%:

1. US Virgin Islands, 5.08%
2. Tennessee, 5.97%
3. South Carolina, 6.05%
4. Alaska, 6.25%
5. Texas, 6.88%
6. Colorado, 7.22%
7. Connecticut, 7.53%
8. California, 7.70%
9. Minnesota, 8.50%
10. Wisconsin, 9.36%
11. Kansas, 9.58%
12. South Dakota, 9.70%

== Alabama ==
1970 Alabama gubernatorial election
- November 3, 1970
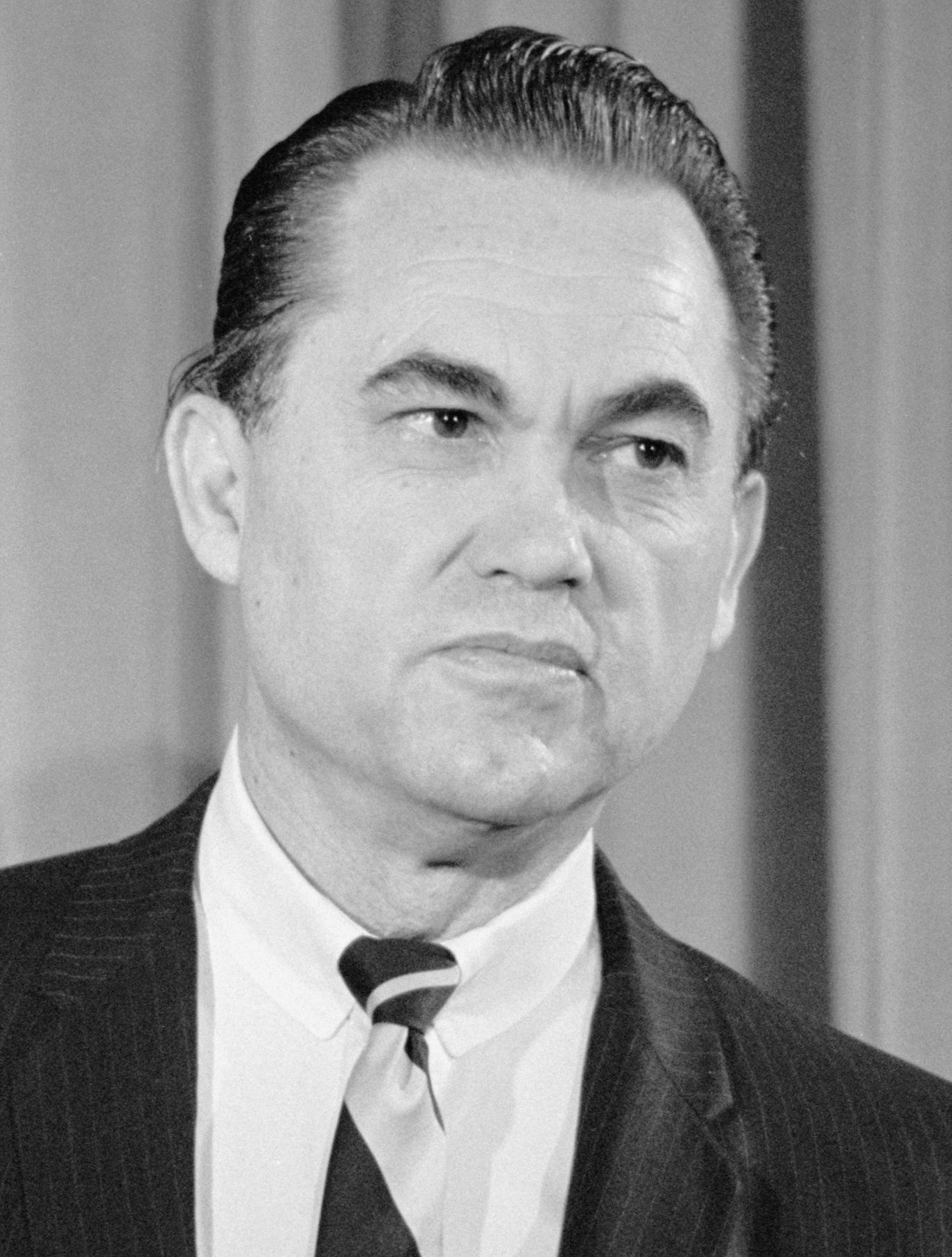

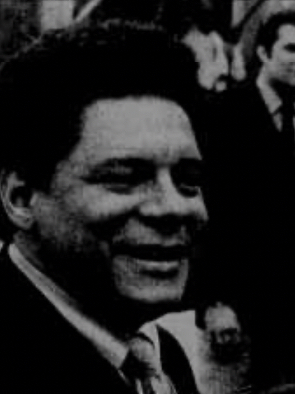

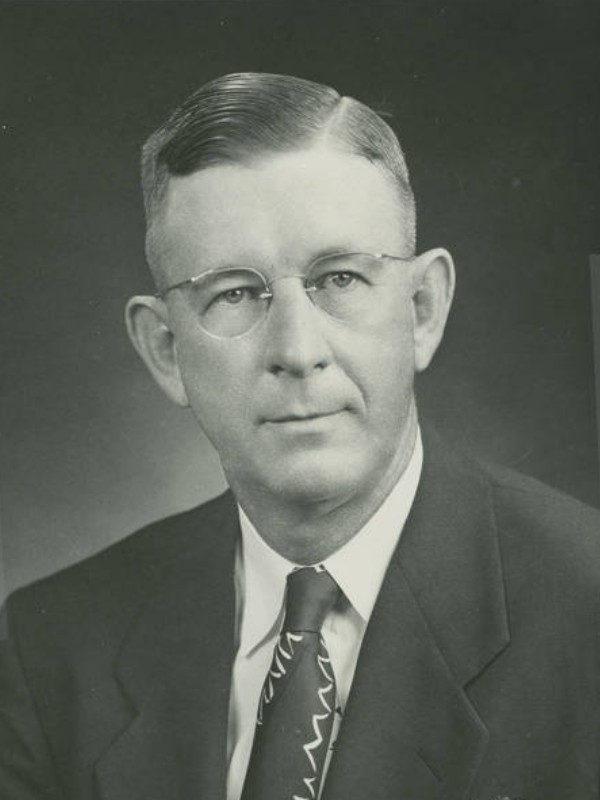
| Nominee | George Wallace | John L. Cashin Jr. | A. C. Shelton |
| Party | Democratic | NDPA | Independent |
| Popular vote | 637,046 | 125,491 | 75,679 |
| Percentage | 74.51% | 14.68% | 8.85% |
- County results Wallace: 50–60% 60–70% 70–80% 80–90% >90% Cashin Jr.: 40–50% 50–60% 60–70%
Governor before election
Albert Brewer
Democratic
Elected Governor
George Wallace
Democratic

In Alabama, Governor Albert Brewer (who succeeded to the governorship upon Lurleen Wallace's death in 1968) had to endure a very nasty Democratic primary against former Governor George Wallace. In addition, there were no Republicans in the race for governor. Wallace won the Democratic primary and the November general election.

== Alaska ==
1970 Alaska gubernatorial election
- November 3, 1970
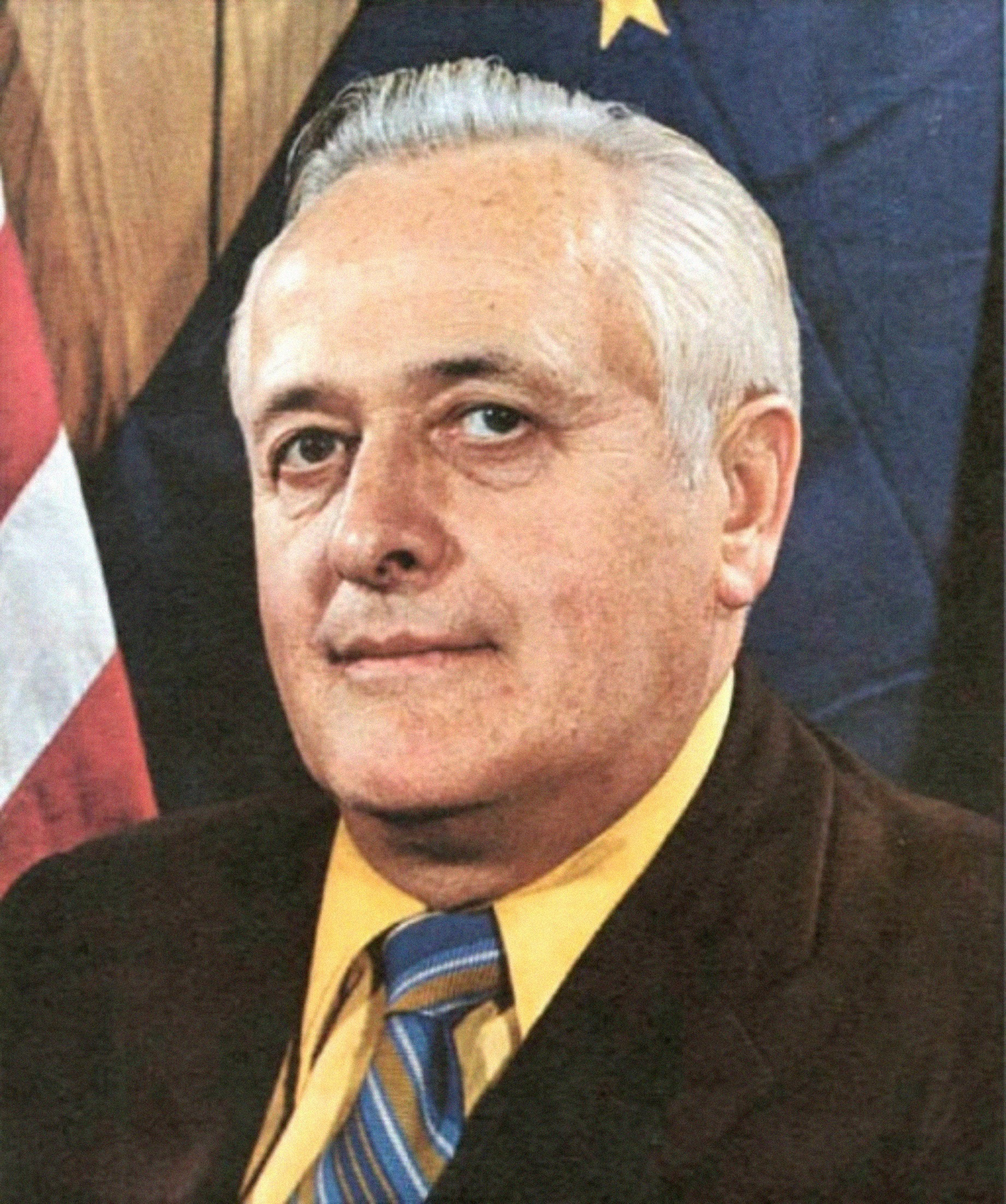

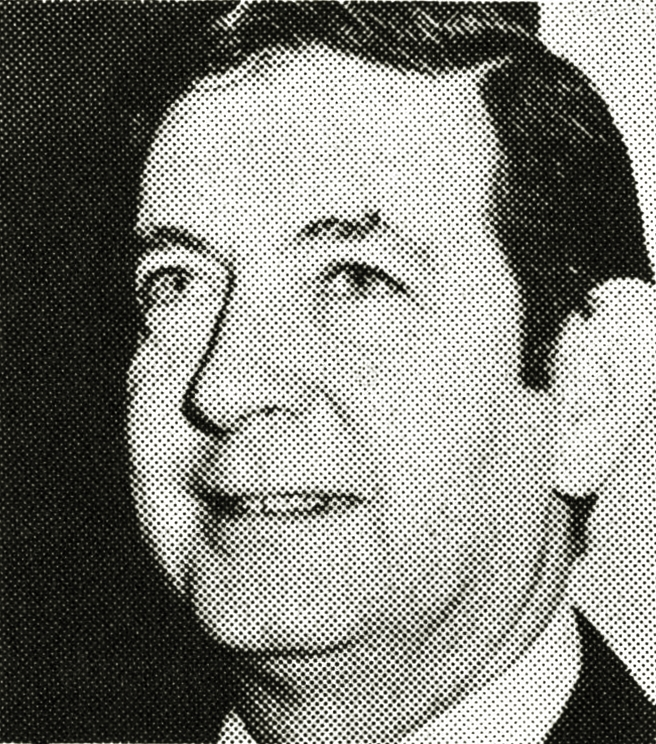
| Nominee | Bill Egan | Keith H. Miller |
| Party | Democratic | Republican |
| Running mate | Red Boucher | Robert W. Ward |
| Popular vote | 42,309 | 37,264 |
| Percentage | 52.38% | 46.13% |
- Results by state house district Egan: 50–60% 60–70% 70–80% 80–90% Miller: 40–50% 50–60% 60–70%
Governor before election
Keith H. Miller
Republican
Elected Governor
Bill Egan
Democratic

In Alaska, then-Lt. Gov. Keith Miller had gotten the job of governor in 1969 after Walter Hickel resigned to be part of President Nixon's Cabinet. He lost in 1970 to former Governor William Egan.

== Arizona ==
1970 Arizona gubernatorial election
- November 3, 1970
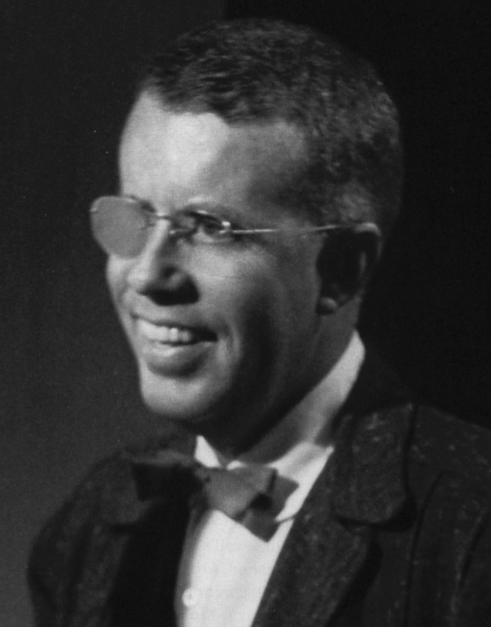

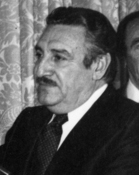
| Nominee | Jack Williams | Raúl Héctor Castro |
| Party | Republican | Democratic |
| Popular vote | 209,355 | 202,053 |
| Percentage | 50.89% | 49.11% |
- County results Williams: 50–60% 60–70% Castro: 50–60% 60–70% 70–80%
Governor before election
Jack Williams
Republican
Elected Governor
Jack Williams
Republican

In Arizona, governors were elected to serve two-year terms until 1970, when Jack Richard Williams was the first governor to be elected to a four-year term. Previously, Williams had been elected governor twice to two-year terms in 1966 and in 1968. Arizona made the switch official from a two-year term to a four-year term in 1968 with an amendment.

== Arkansas ==
1970 Arkansas gubernatorial election
- November 3, 1970
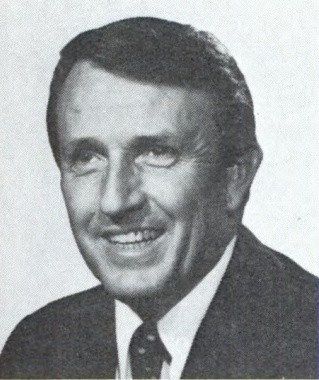

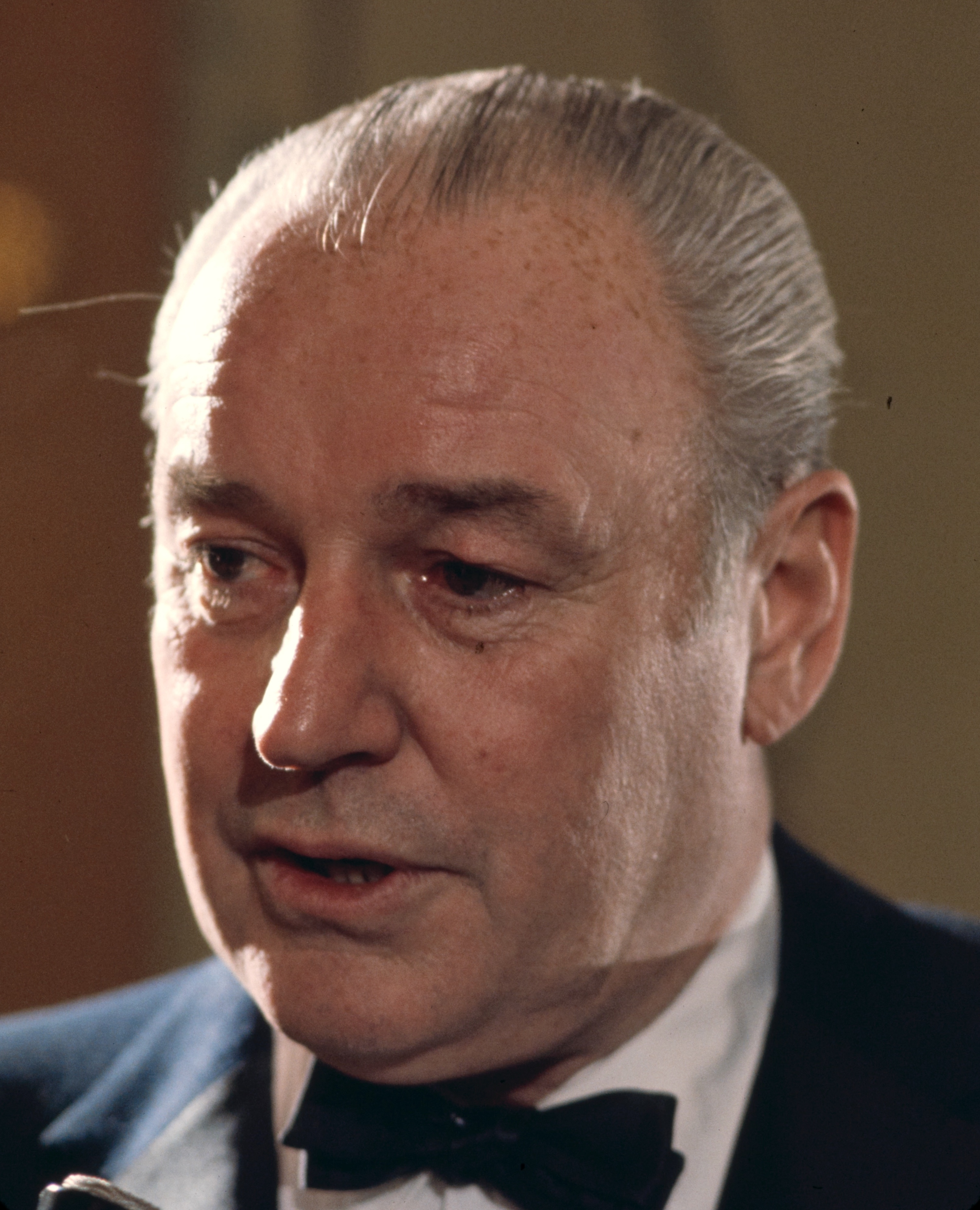

| Nominee | Dale Bumpers | Winthrop Rockefeller | Walter L. Carruth |
| Party | Democratic | Republican | American |
| Popular vote | 375,648 | 197,418 | 36,132 |
| Percentage | 61.66% | 32.41% | 5.93% |
- County results Bumpers: 40–50% 50–60% 60–70% 70–80% Rockefeller: 40–50%
Governor before election
Winthrop Rockefeller
Republican
Elected Governor
Dale Bumpers
Democratic

In Arkansas, Winthrop Rockefeller was the first Republican governor in Arkansas since the Reconstruction period. He was defeated in his bid for a third term, by the Democratic challenger Dale Bumpers.

== California ==
1970 California gubernatorial election
- November 3, 1970
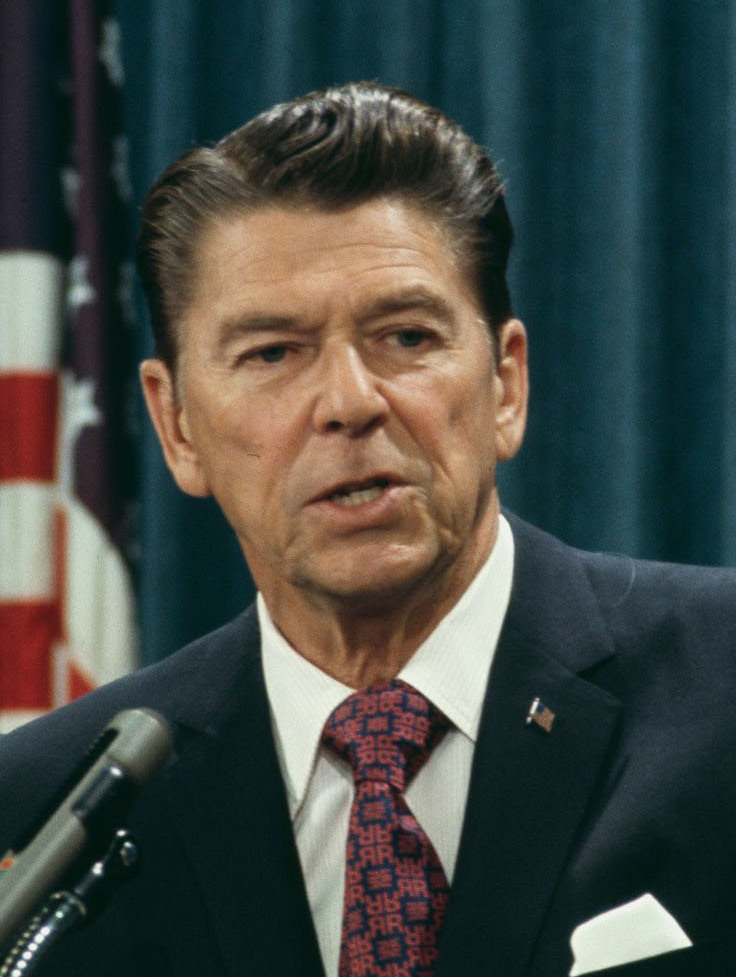

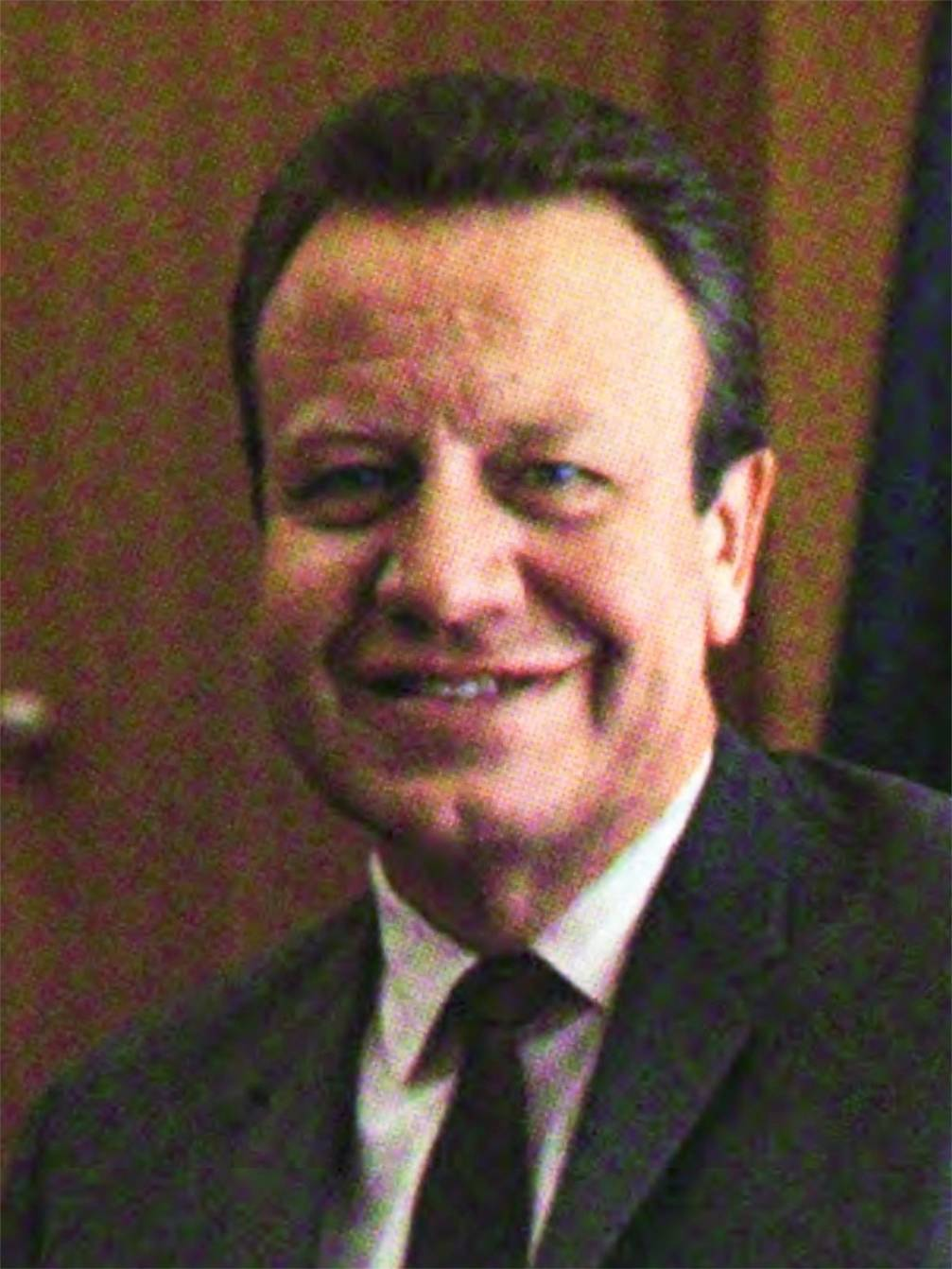
| Nominee | Ronald Reagan | Jesse Unruh |
| Party | Republican | Democratic |
| Popular vote | 3,439,174 | 2,938,607 |
| Percentage | 52.84% | 45.14% |
- Reagan: 40–50% 50–60% 60–70% 70–80% Unruh: 40–50% 50–60% 60–70% >90%
Governor before election
Ronald Reagan
Republican
Elected Governor
Ronald Reagan
Republican

Incumbent Republican Governor and future President Ronald Reagan was elected to a second term as governor with about 53% of the vote over Speaker of the State Assembly Jesse Unruh.

== Connecticut ==
1970 Connecticut gubernatorial election
- November 3, 1970
- Turnout: 80.5%
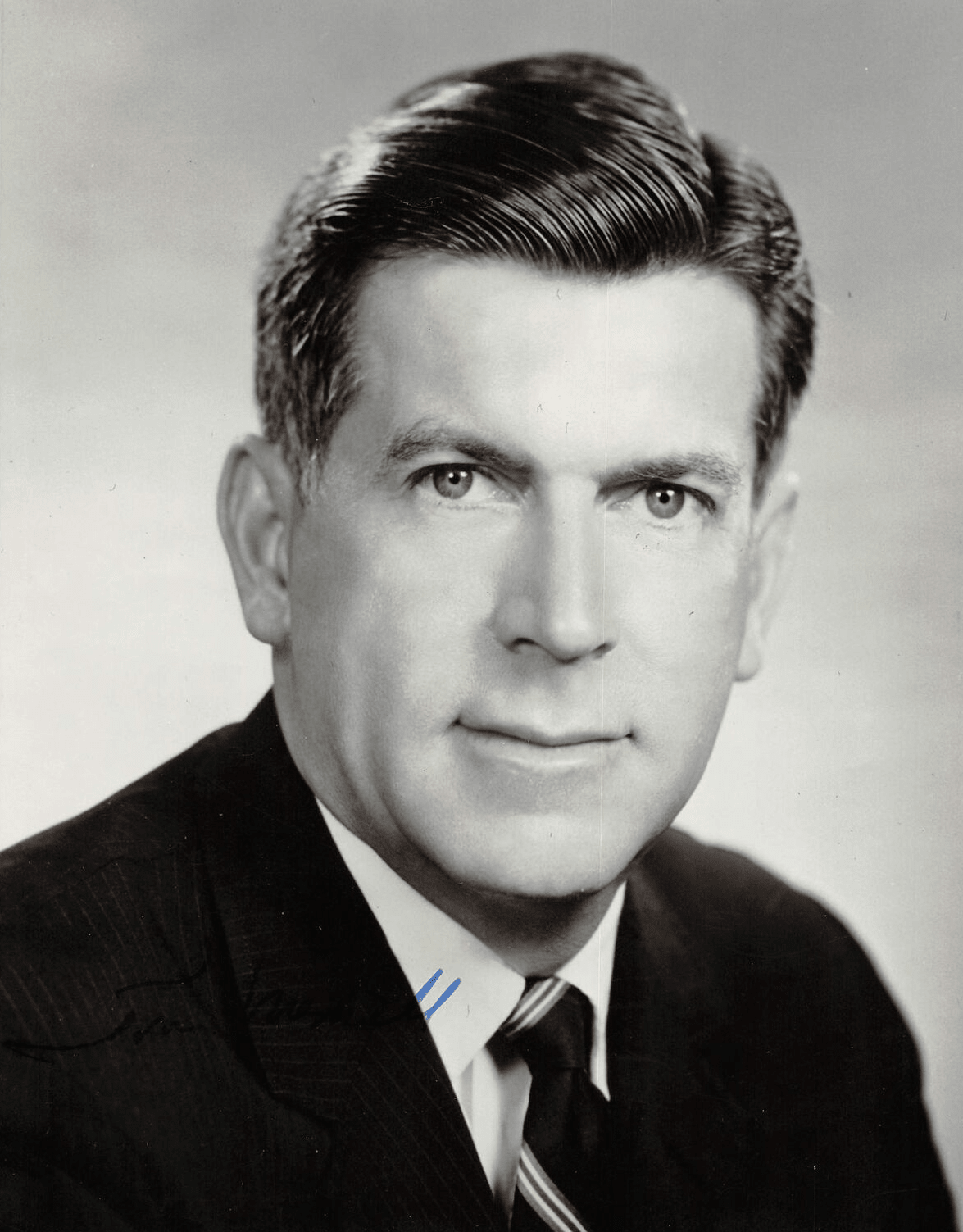

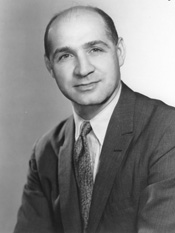
| Nominee | Thomas J. Meskill | Emilio Q. Daddario |
| Party | Republican | Democratic |
| Running mate | T. Clark Hull | Hugh C. Curran |
| Popular vote | 582,160 | 500,561 |
| Percentage | 53.76% | 46.23% |
- Meskill: 50–60% 60–70% 70–80% 80–90% Daddario: 50–60% 60–70%
Governor before election
John N. Dempsey
Democratic
Elected Governor
Thomas Meskill
Republican

Incumbent John Dempsey, a Democrat, did not seek re-election. 6th District Congressman Thomas Joseph Meskill (Republican) defeated 1st District Congressman Emilio Q. Daddario (Democratic) 53.76% to 46.23%.

== Colorado ==
1970 Colorado gubernatorial election
- November 3, 1970
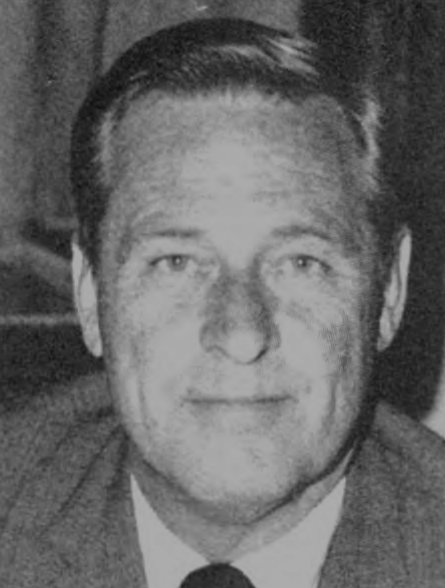

| Nominee | John Arthur Love | Mark Anthony Hogan |
| Party | Republican | Democratic |
| Running mate | John Vanderhoof | Charles Grant |
| Popular vote | 350,690 | 302,432 |
| Percentage | 52.46% | 45.24% |
- County results Love: 40–50% 50–60% 60–70% Hogan: 40–50% 50–60% 60–70%
Governor before election
John Arthur Love
Republican
Elected Governor
John Arthur Love
Republican

In Colorado, John Arthur Love won re-election.

== Florida ==
1970 Florida gubernatorial election
- November 3, 1970
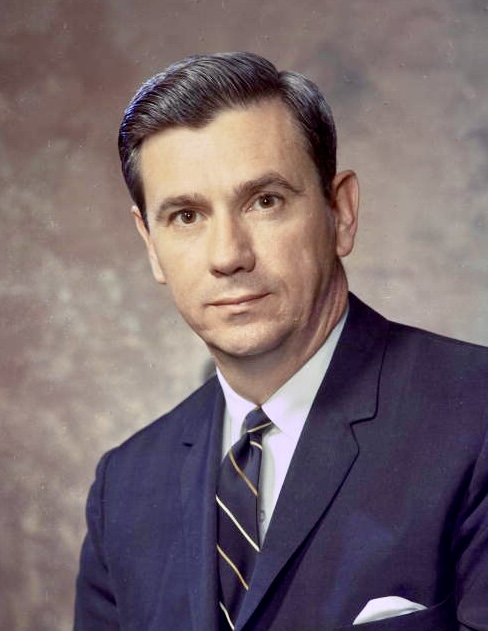

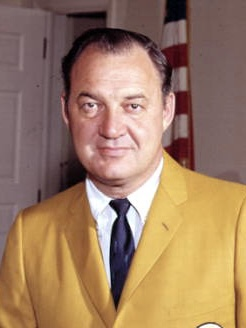
| Nominee | Reubin Askew | Claude R. Kirk Jr. |
| Party | Democratic | Republican |
| Running mate | Thomas B. Adams Jr. | Ray Osborne |
| Popular vote | 984,305 | 746,243 |
| Percentage | 56.99% | 43.12% |
- County results Askew: 50–60% 60–70% 70–80% 80–90% Kirk: 50–60% 60–70%
Governor before election
Claude R. Kirk Jr.
Republican
Elected Governor
Reubin Askew
Democratic

Florida's Claude R. Kirk Jr. was the first Republican governor since Reconstruction, and was defeated by Democrat Reubin Askew.

== Georgia ==
1970 Georgia gubernatorial election
- November 3, 1970
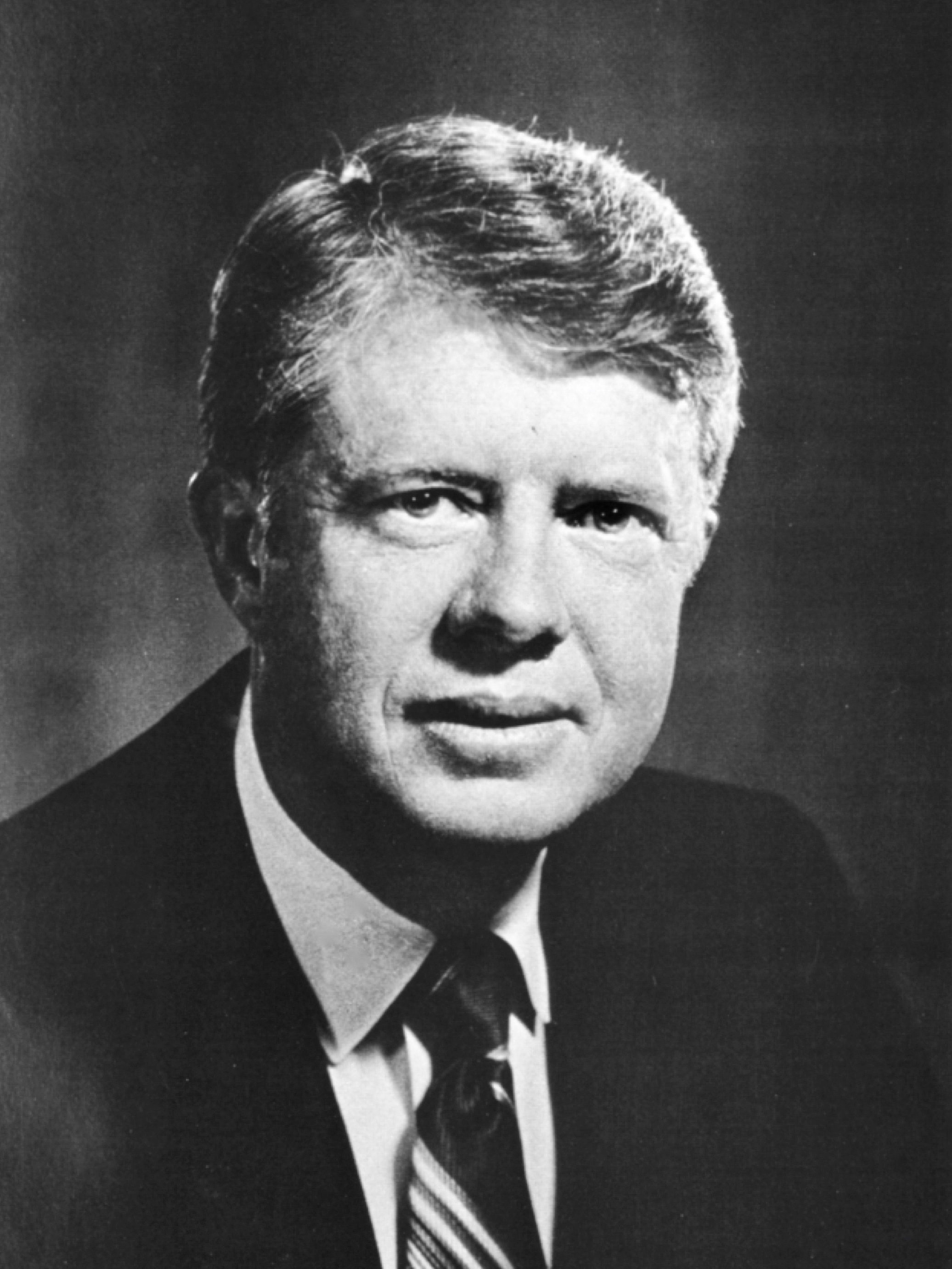

| Nominee | Jimmy Carter | Hal Suit |
| Party | Democratic | Republican |
| Popular vote | 620,419 | 424,983 |
| Percentage | 59.35% | 40.65% |
- County results Carter: 50–60% 60–70% 70–80% 80–90% >90% Suit: 50–60% 60–70%
Governor before election
Lester Maddox
Democratic
Elected Governor
Jimmy Carter
Democratic

In Georgia, governors were limited to one term until a constitutional amendment in 1976. Future president Democrat Jimmy Carter won the election.

== Hawaii ==
1970 Hawaii gubernatorial election
- November 3, 1970
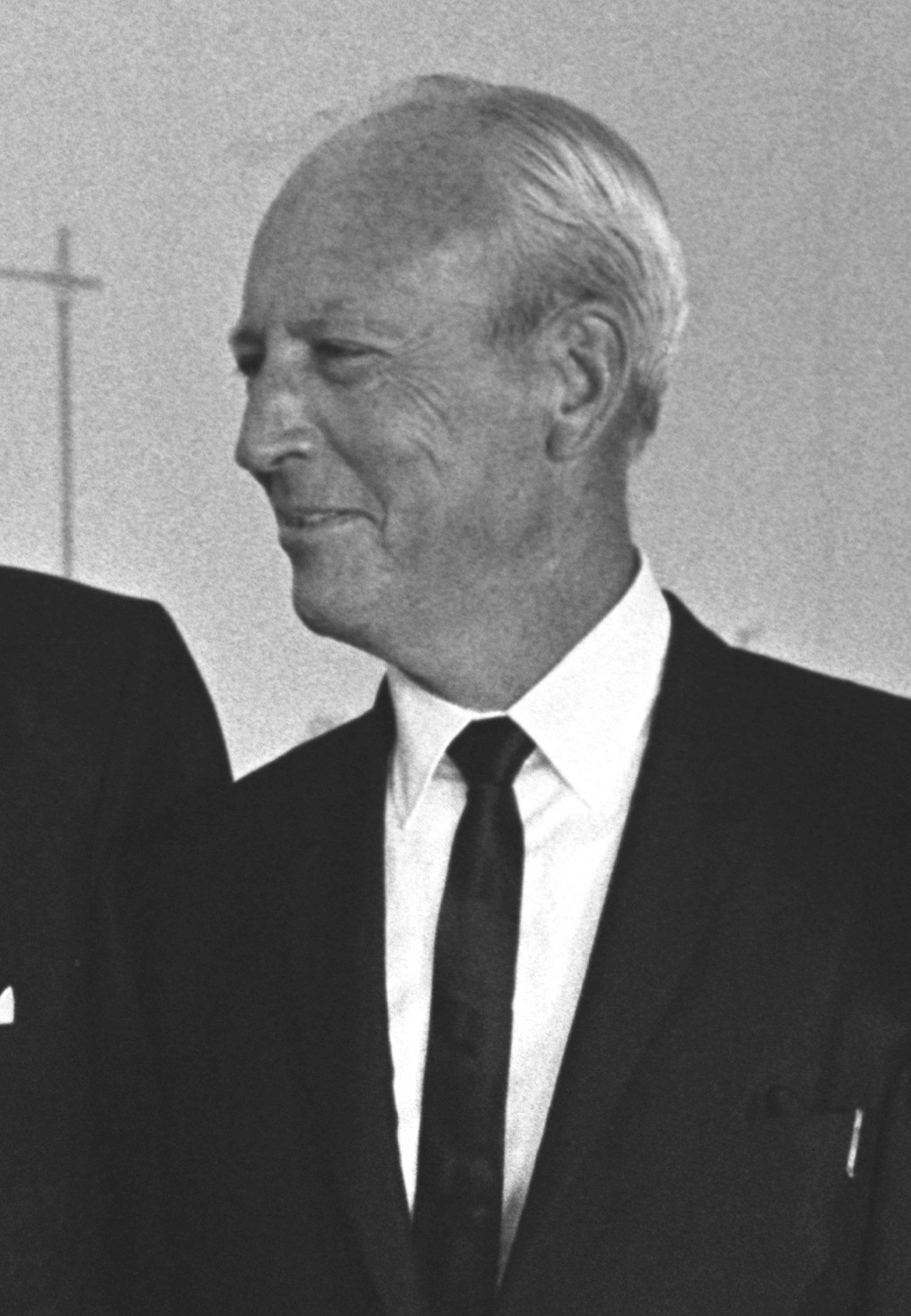

| Nominee | John A. Burns | Samuel King |
| Party | Democratic | Republican |
| Running mate | George Ariyoshi | Ralph Kiyosaki |
| Popular vote | 137,812 | 101,249 |
| Percentage | 57.65% | 42.35% |
- County results Burns: 50–60% 60–70%
Governor before election
John A. Burns
Democratic
Elected Governor
John A. Burns
Democratic

In Hawaii, Burns won another term in 1970, but in 1973, Burns had health problems and his Lt. Governor, George Ariyoshi, took over as acting governor; in 1974, with Burns' retirement, he won a term in his own right. Burns died in 1975.

== Idaho ==
1970 Idaho gubernatorial election
- November 3, 1970
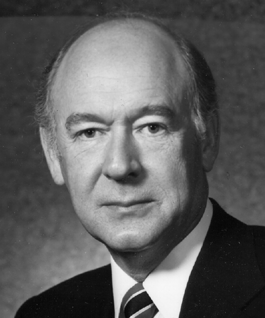

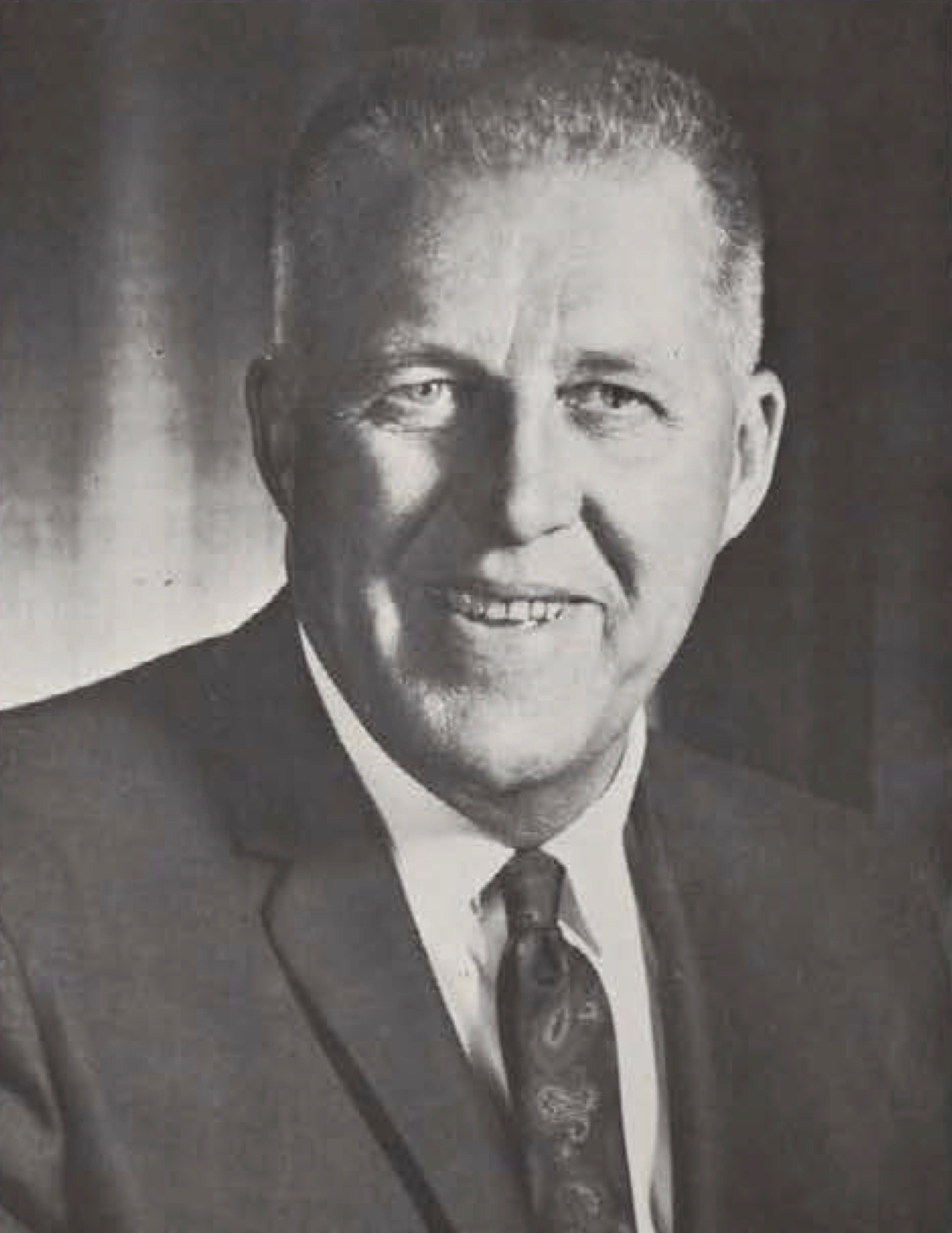
| Nominee | Cecil Andrus | Don Samuelson |
| Party | Democratic | Republican |
| Popular vote | 128,004 | 117,108 |
| Percentage | 52.22% | 47.78% |
- County results Andrus: 50–60% 60–70% 70–80% Samuelson: 50–60% 60–70% 70–80% 80–90%
Governor before election
Don Samuelson
Republican
Elected Governor
Cecil Andrus
Democratic

== Iowa ==
1970 Iowa gubernatorial election
- November 3, 1970
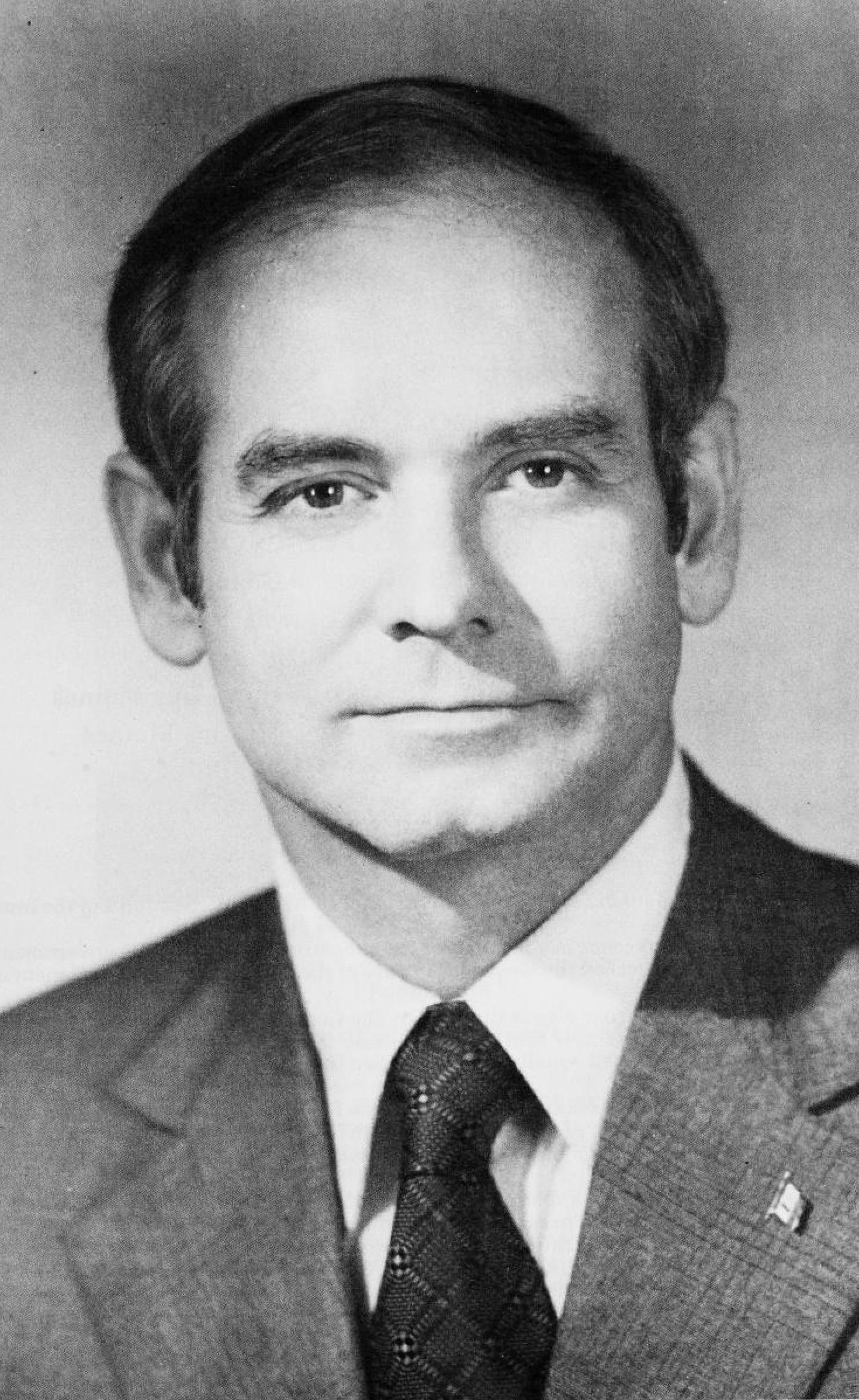

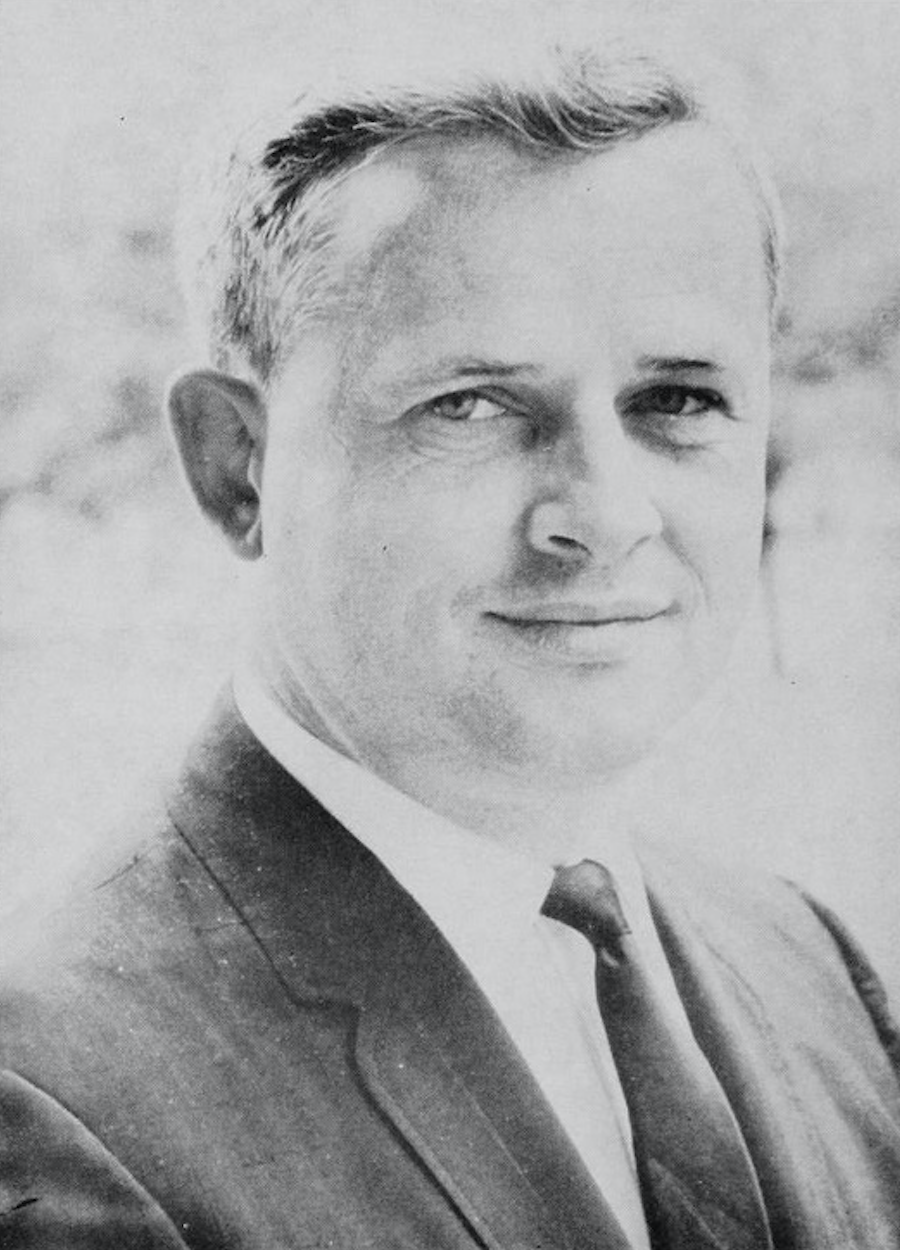
| Nominee | Robert D. Ray | Robert D. Fulton |
| Party | Republican | Democratic |
| Popular vote | 403,394 | 368,911 |
| Percentage | 50.98% | 46.62% |
- County results Ray: 40–50% 50–60% 60–70% Fulton: 40–50% 50–60%
Governor before election
Robert D. Ray
Republican
Elected Governor
Robert D. Ray
Republican

Iowa also had its governors serving two-year terms until Robert D. Ray won a four-year term in 1974. Previously, Ray had won a two-year term in 1968, a two-year term this year (1970), and would win another two-year term in 1972. Iowa made the four-year term switch official with an amendment to the state's constitution in 1972.

== Kansas ==
1970 Kansas gubernatorial election
- November 3, 1970
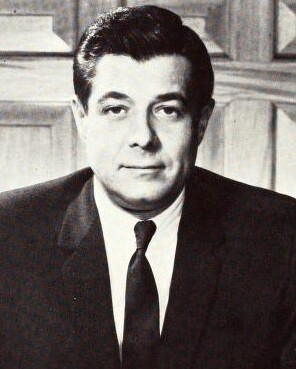

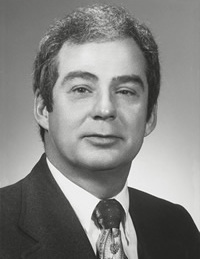
| Nominee | Robert Docking | Kent Frizzell |
| Party | Democratic | Republican |
| Popular vote | 404,611 | 333,227 |
| Percentage | 54.30% | 44.72% |
- County results Docking: 40–50% 50–60% 60–70% Frizzell: 40–50% 50–60% 60–70%
Governor before election
Robert Docking
Democratic
Elected Governor
Robert Docking
Democratic

Like Arizona and Iowa, Kansas also had its governors serving two-year terms until 1974, when a constitutional amendment was added, creating a four-year term for governors. Docking was elected governor in 1966, 1968, 1970, and would get elected in 1972.

== Maine ==
1970 Maine gubernatorial election
- November 3, 1970
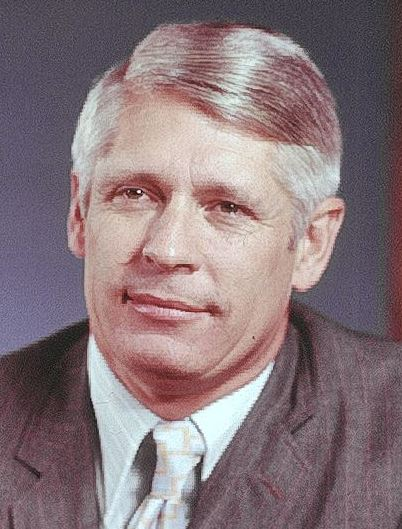

| Nominee | Kenneth Curtis | James Erwin |
| Party | Democratic | Republican |
| Popular vote | 163,138 | 162,248 |
| Percentage | 50.14% | 49.86% |
- Curtis: 50–60% 60–70% 70–80% 80–90% >90% Erwin: 50–60% 60–70% 70–80% 80–90% >90% Tie: 50%
Governor before election
Kenneth M. Curtis
Democratic
Elected Governor
Kenneth M. Curtis
Democratic

Democrat Kenneth Curtis was narrowly re-elected after a recount.

== Maryland ==
1970 Maryland gubernatorial election
- November 3, 1970
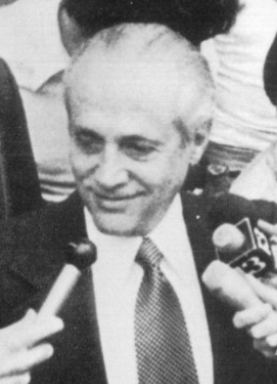

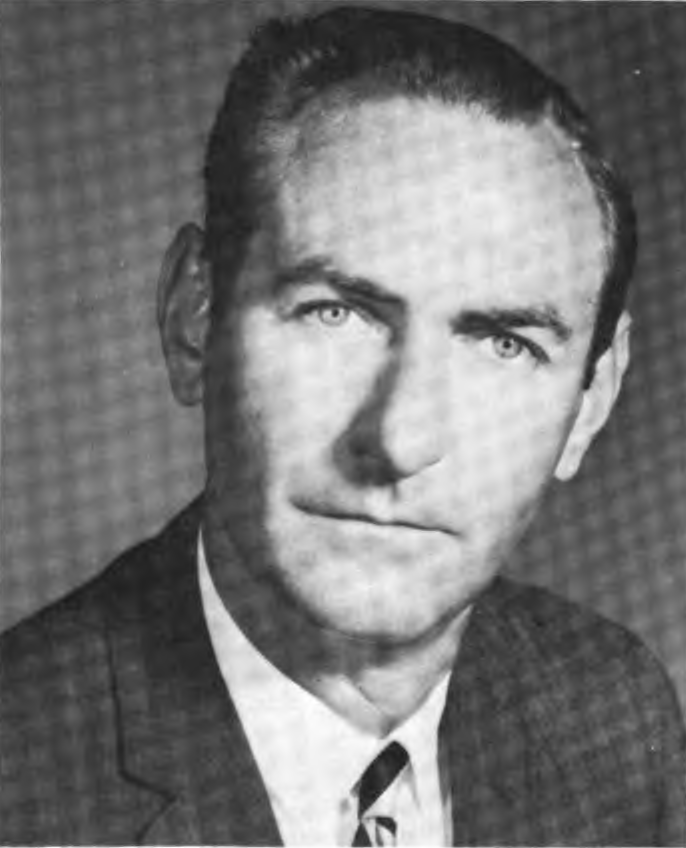
| Nominee | Marvin Mandel | Charles Stanley Blair |
| Party | Democratic | Republican |
| Popular vote | 639,579 | 314,336 |
| Percentage | 65.73% | 32.30% |
- County results Mandel: 40–50% 50–60% 60–70% 70–80% Blair: 40–50%
Governor before election
Marvin Mandel
Democratic
Elected Governor
Marvin Mandel
Democratic

In Maryland, Democrat Marvin Mandel first won the governorship in 1969 in a special election when Republican Spiro Agnew resigned in order to become Vice President of the United States. In 1970, Mandel ran for a full term and won.

== Massachusetts ==
1970 Massachusetts gubernatorial election
- November 3, 1970
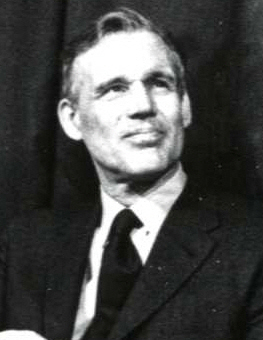

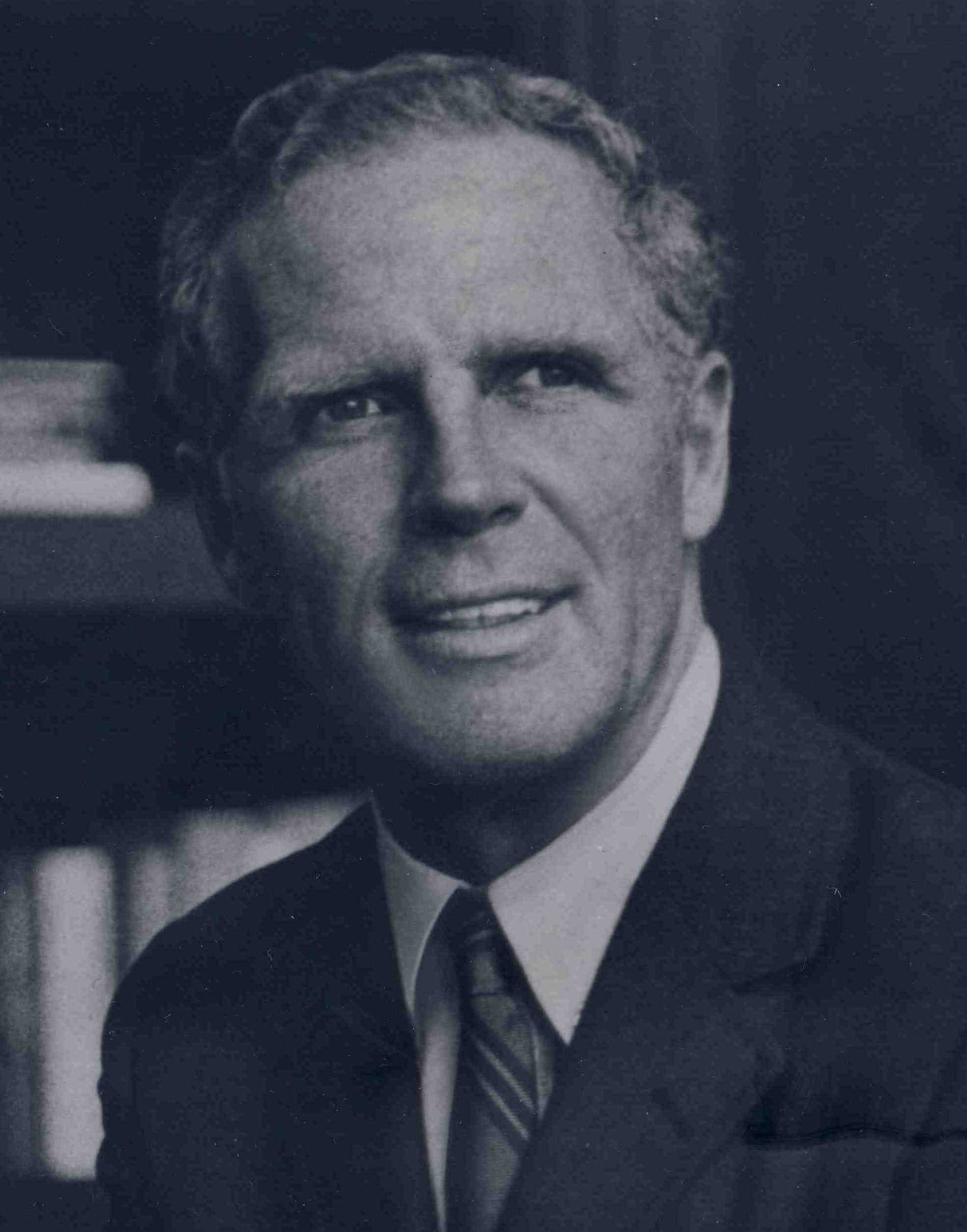
| Nominee | Francis Sargent | Kevin White |
| Party | Republican | Democratic |
| Running mate | Donald R. Dwight | Michael Dukakis |
| Popular vote | 1,058,623 | 799,269 |
| Percentage | 56.67% | 42.79% |
- Sargent: 40–50% 50–60% 60–70% 70–80% 80–90% >90% White: 40–50% 50–60% 60–70%
Governor before election
Francis Sargent (acting)
Republican
Elected Governor
Francis Sargent
Republican

John A. Volpe resigned in 1969 to become President Nixon's Secretary of Transportation. Francis W. Sargent then became acting governor. In 1970, Sargent got a term in his own right.

== Michigan ==
1970 Michigan gubernatorial election
- November 3, 1970
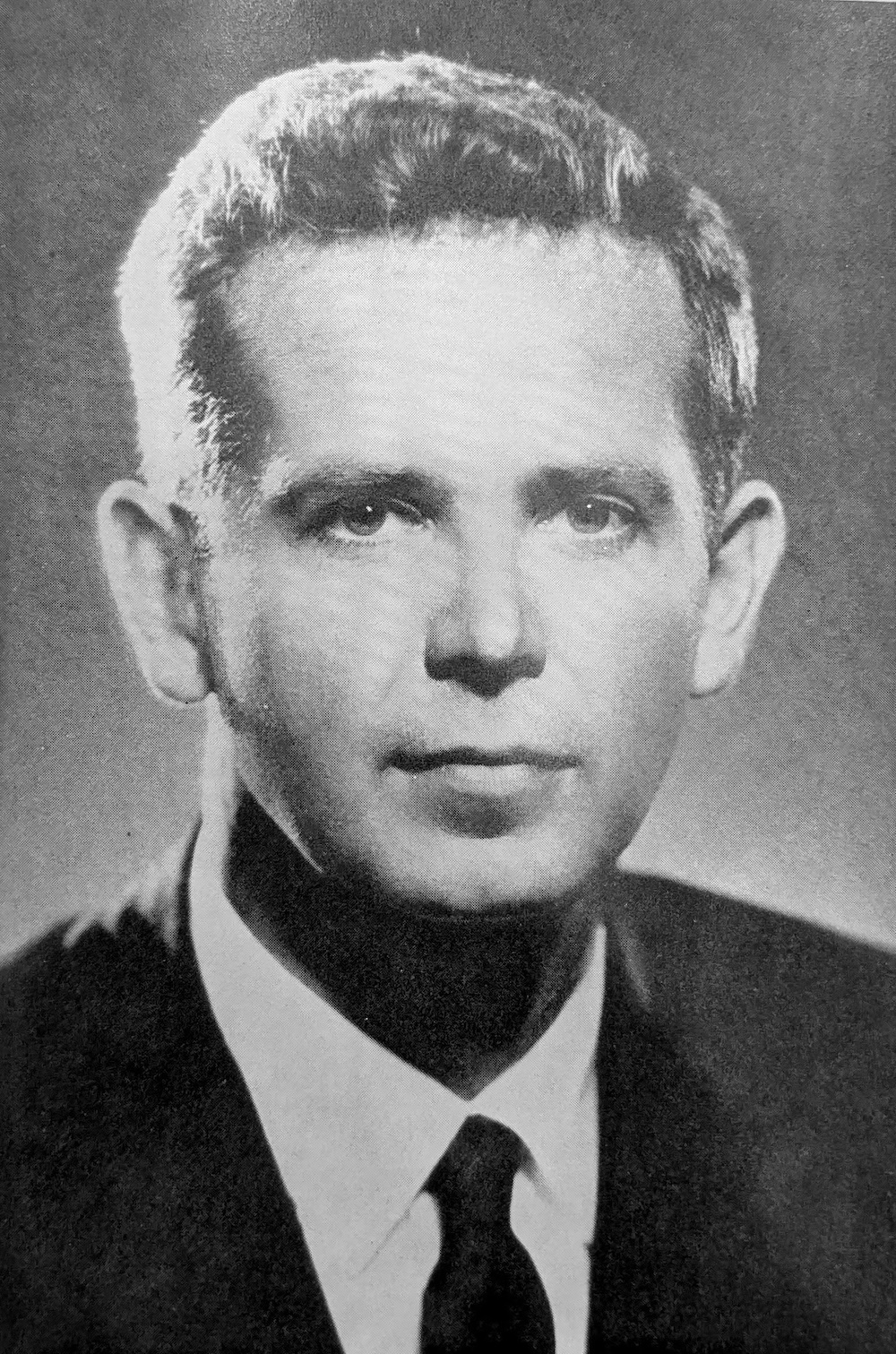

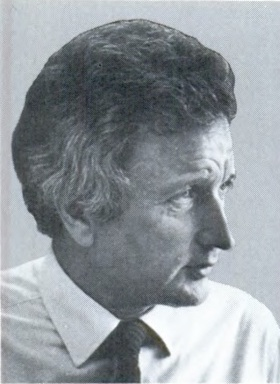
| Nominee | William Milliken | Sander Levin |
| Party | Republican | Democratic |
| Running mate | James H. Brickley | Edward H. McNamara |
| Popular vote | 1,339,047 | 1,294,638 |
| Percentage | 50.41% | 48.74% |
- County results Milliken: 40–50% 50–60% 60–70% Levin: 40–50% 50–60% 60–70%
Governor before election
William Milliken
Republican
Governor
William Milliken
Republican

George W. Romney resigned in 1969 to become President Nixon's Housing and Urban Development Secretary. William Milliken became governor, and won a full term in 1970.

== Minnesota ==
1970 Minnesota gubernatorial election
- November 3, 1970
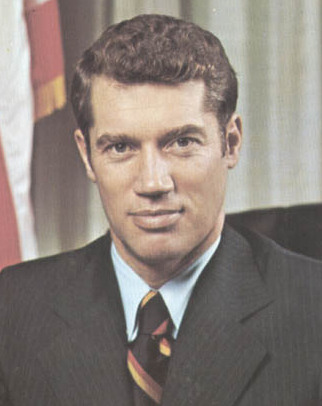

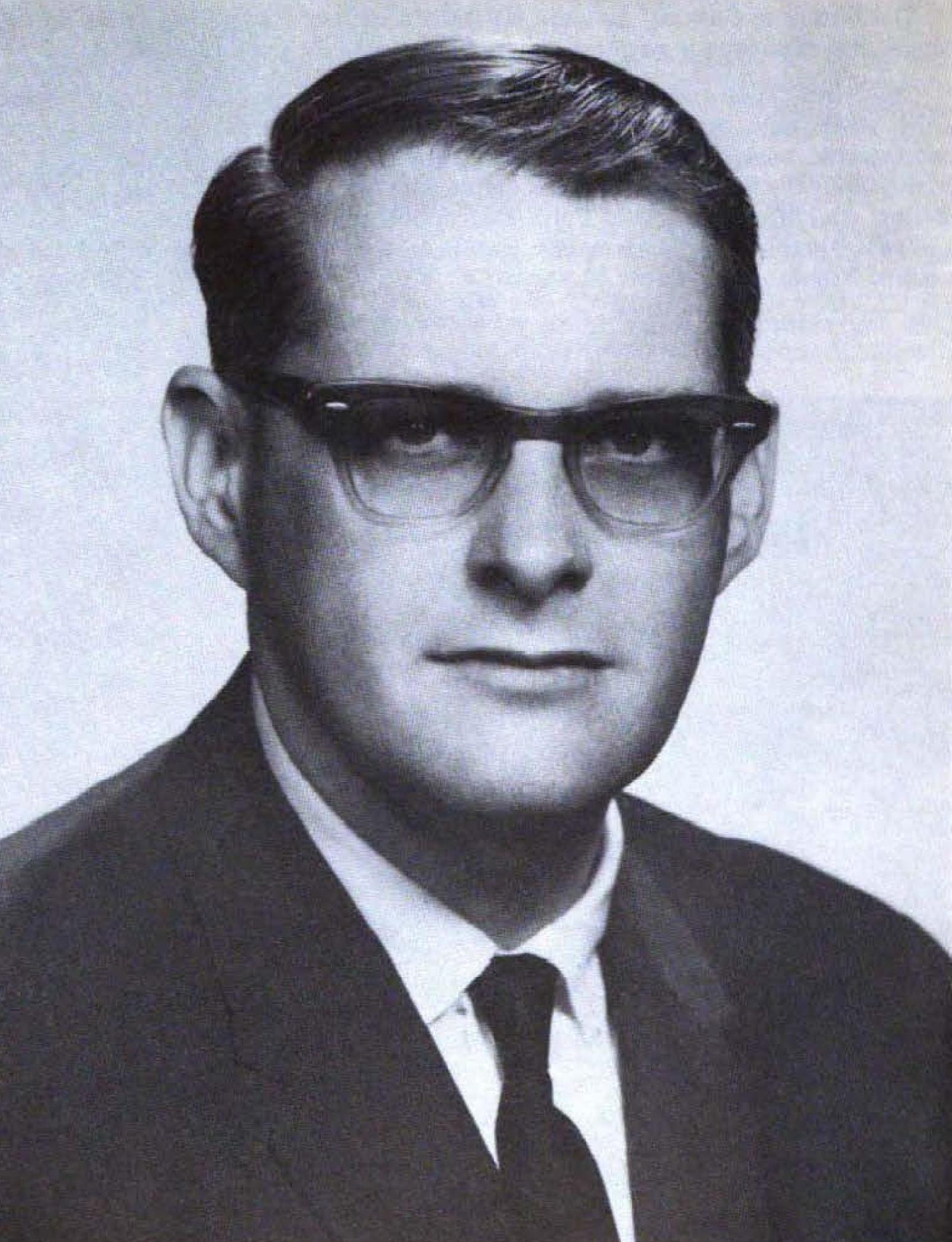
| Nominee | Wendell Anderson | Douglas M. Head |
| Party | Democratic (DFL) | Republican |
| Popular vote | 737,921 | 621,780 |
| Percentage | 54.04% | 45.54% |
- County results Anderson: 50–60% 60–70% 70–80% Head: 40–50% 50–60% 60–70%
Governor before election
Harold LeVander
Republican
Elected Governor
Wendell Anderson
Democratic (DFL)

== Nebraska ==
1970 Nebraska gubernatorial election
- November 3, 1970
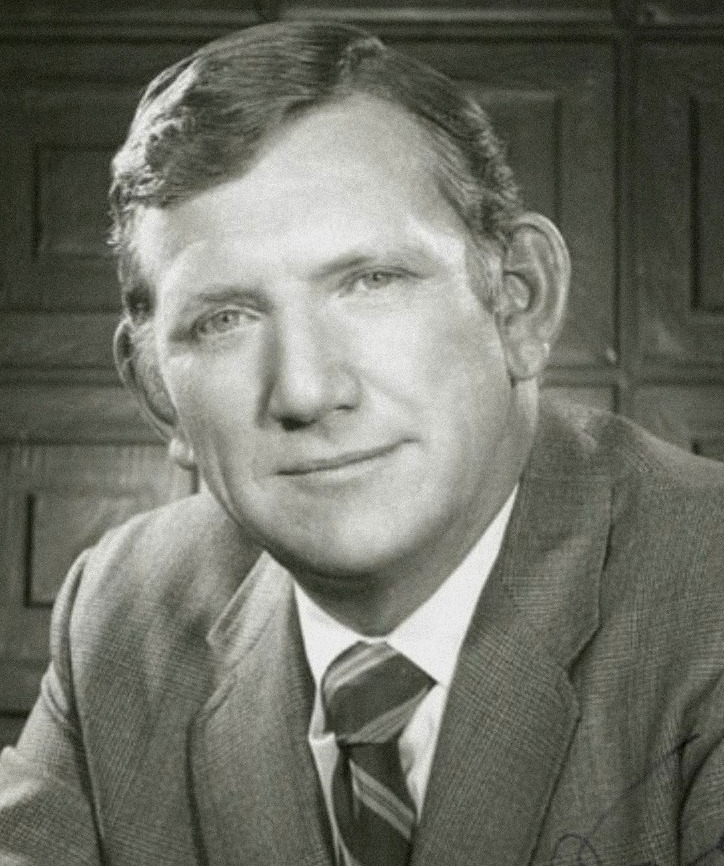

| Nominee | James Exon | Norbert Tiemann |
| Party | Democratic | Republican |
| Popular vote | 248,552 | 201,994 |
| Percentage | 53.84% | 43.76% |
- County results Exon: 40–50% 50–60% 60–70% 70–80% Tiemann: 40–50% 50–60% 60–70%
Governor before election
Norbert Tiemann
Republican
Elected Governor
James Exon
Democratic

Norbert Tiemann was the first Nebraskan to get a four-year term in the 1966 governor's race. Democrat J. James Exon defeated Tiemann in 1970.

== Nevada ==
1970 Nevada gubernatorial election
- November 3, 1970
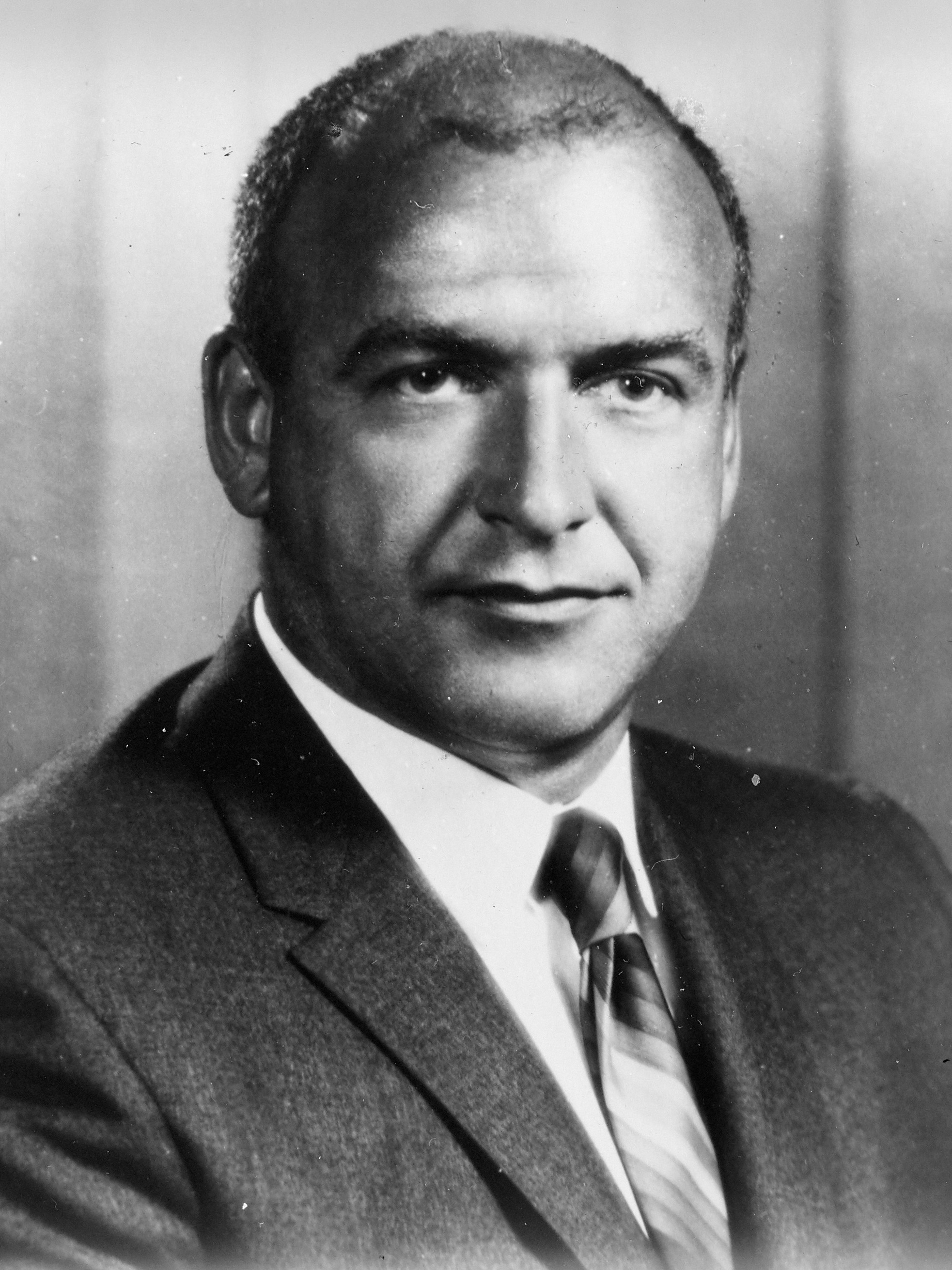

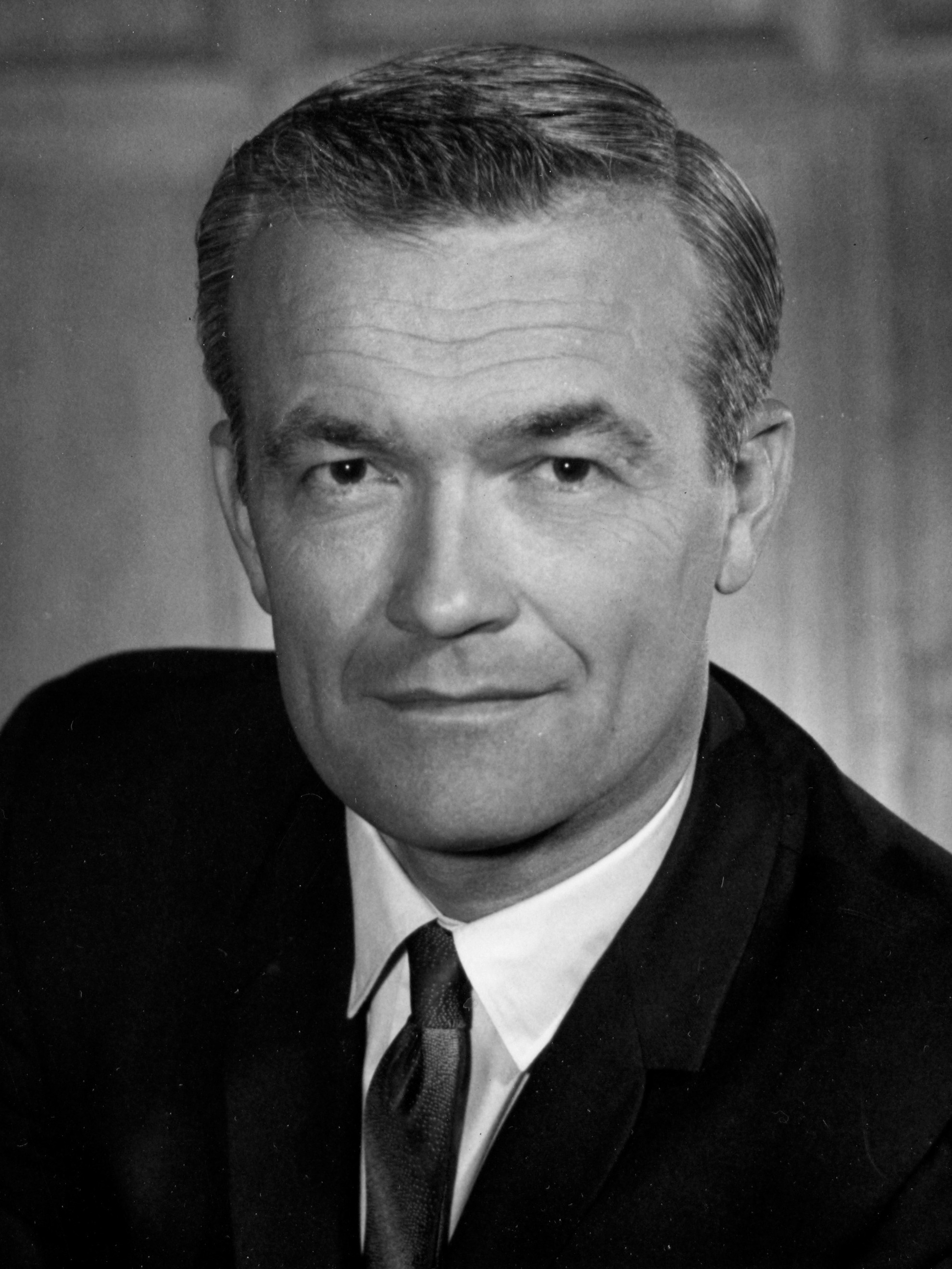
| Nominee | Mike O'Callaghan | Ed Fike |
| Party | Democratic | Republican |
| Popular vote | 70,697 | 64,400 |
| Percentage | 48.10% | 43.81% |
- County results O'Callaghan: 40–50% 50–60% 60–70% Fike: 40–50% 50–60%
Governor before election
Paul Laxalt
Republican
Elected Governor
Mike O'Callaghan
Democratic

== New Hampshire ==
1970 New Hampshire gubernatorial election
- November 3, 1970
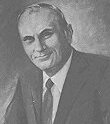

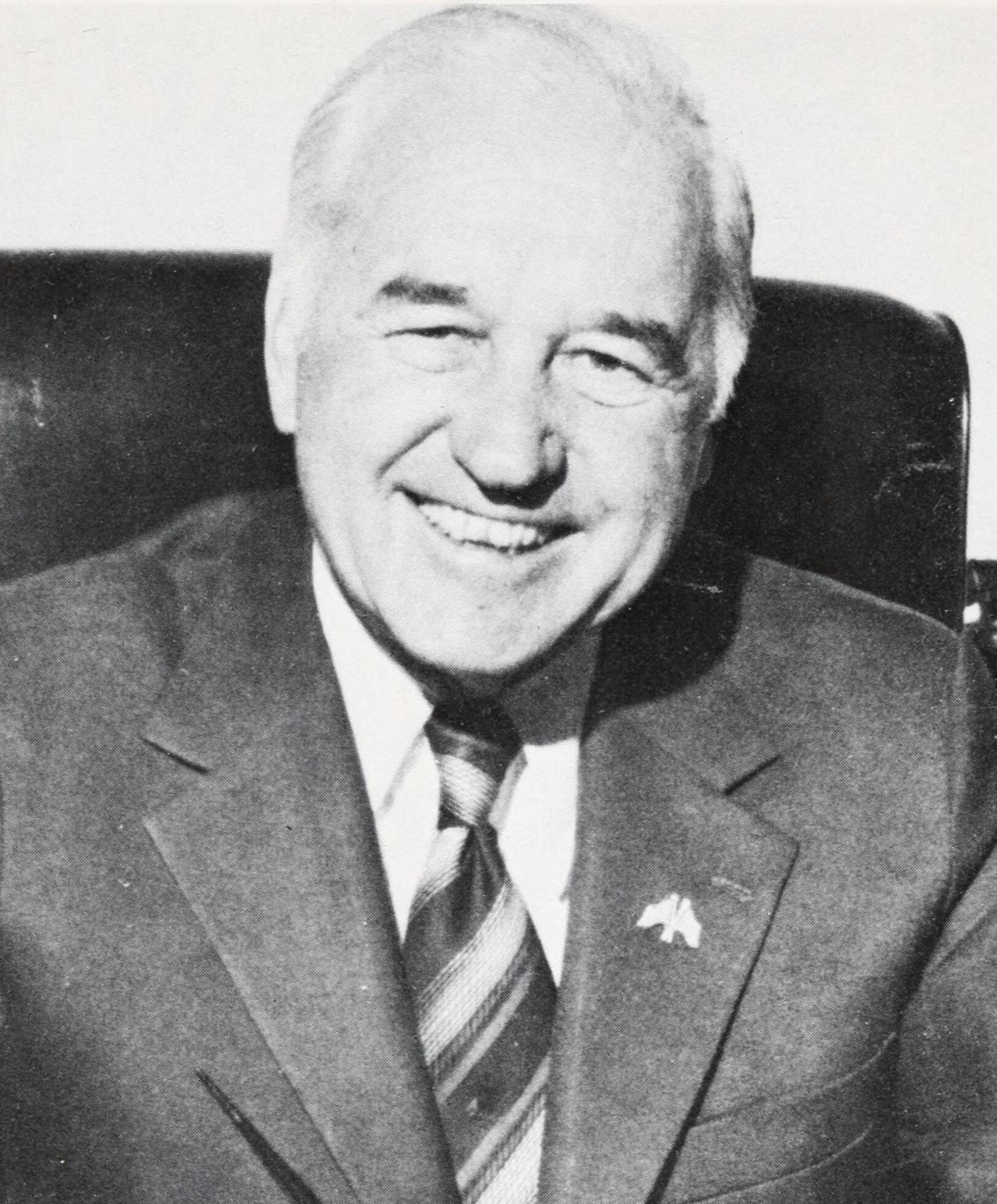
| Nominee | Walter R. Peterson Jr. | Roger J. Crowley | Meldrim Thomson |
| Party | Republican | Democratic | American |
| Popular vote | 102,298 | 98,098 | 22,033 |
| Percentage | 45.99% | 44.10% | 9.91% |
- Peterson: 30–40% 40–50% 50–60% 60–70% 70–80% 80–90% >90% Crowley: 30–40% 40–50% 50–60% 60–70% 70–80% Thomson: 30–40% 40–50% 50–60% No Data/Vote
Governor before election
Walter R. Peterson Jr.
Republican
Elected Governor
Walter R. Peterson Jr.
Republican

== New Mexico ==
1970 New Mexico gubernatorial election
- November 3, 1970
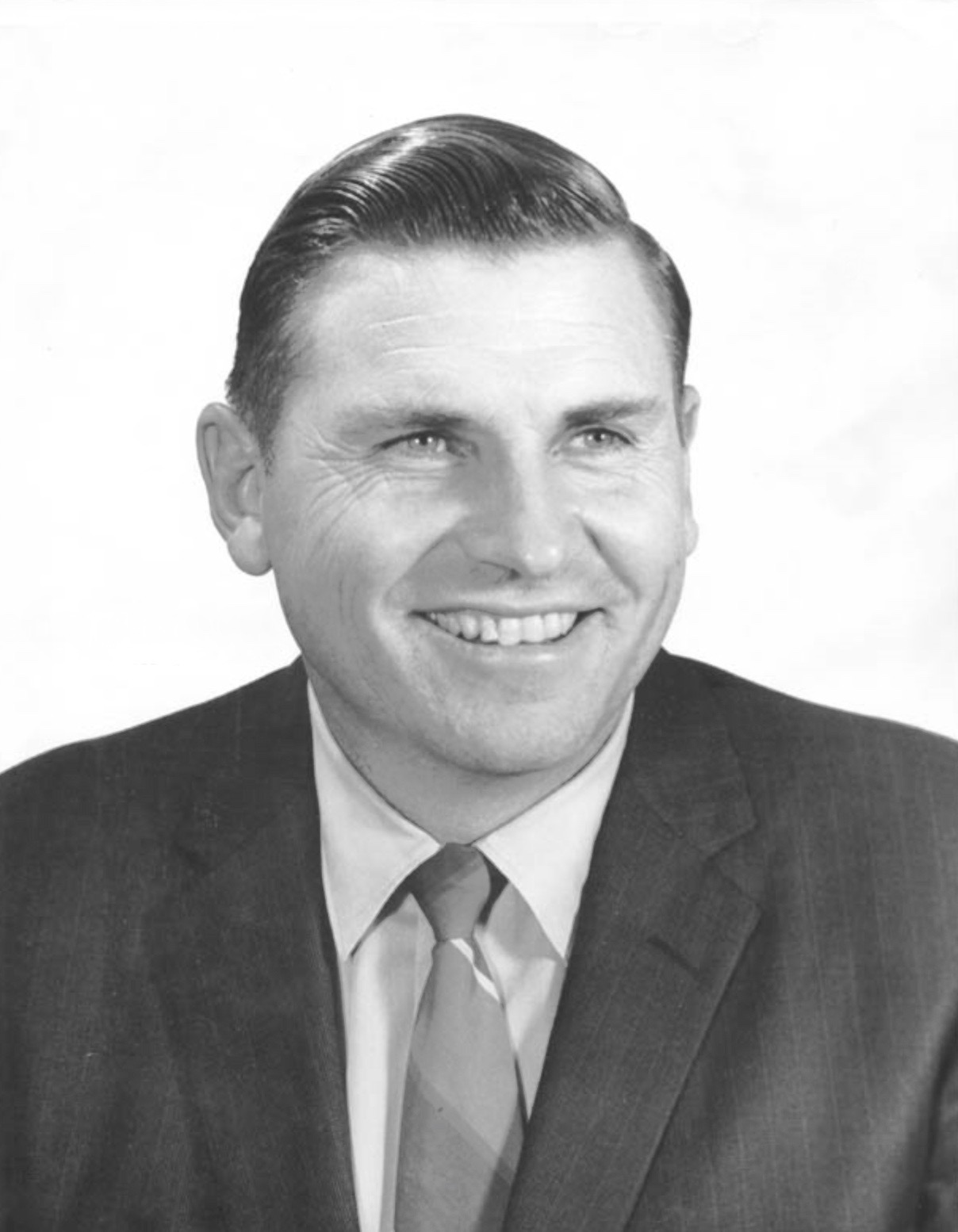

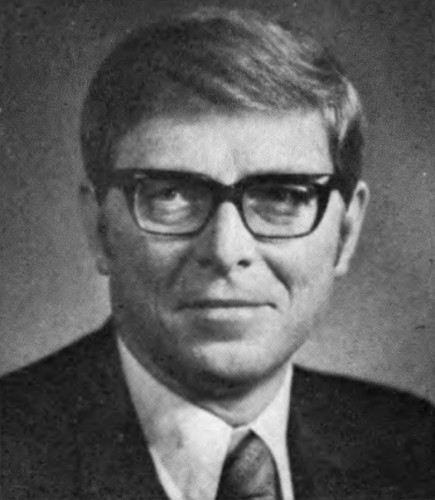
| Nominee | Bruce King | Pete Domenici |
| Party | Democratic | Republican |
| Popular vote | 148,835 | 134,640 |
| Percentage | 51.26% | 46.37% |
- County results King: 50–60% 60–70% 70–80% Domenici: 50–60% 60–70%
Governor before election
David Cargo
Republican
Elected Governor
Bruce King
Democratic

New Mexico had a two-year term for governors until 1970, when the state constitution was changed to a four-year term with governors being ineligible for consecutive terms. Bruce King was elected to the first of three non-consecutive terms.

== New York ==
1970 New York gubernatorial election
- November 3, 1970
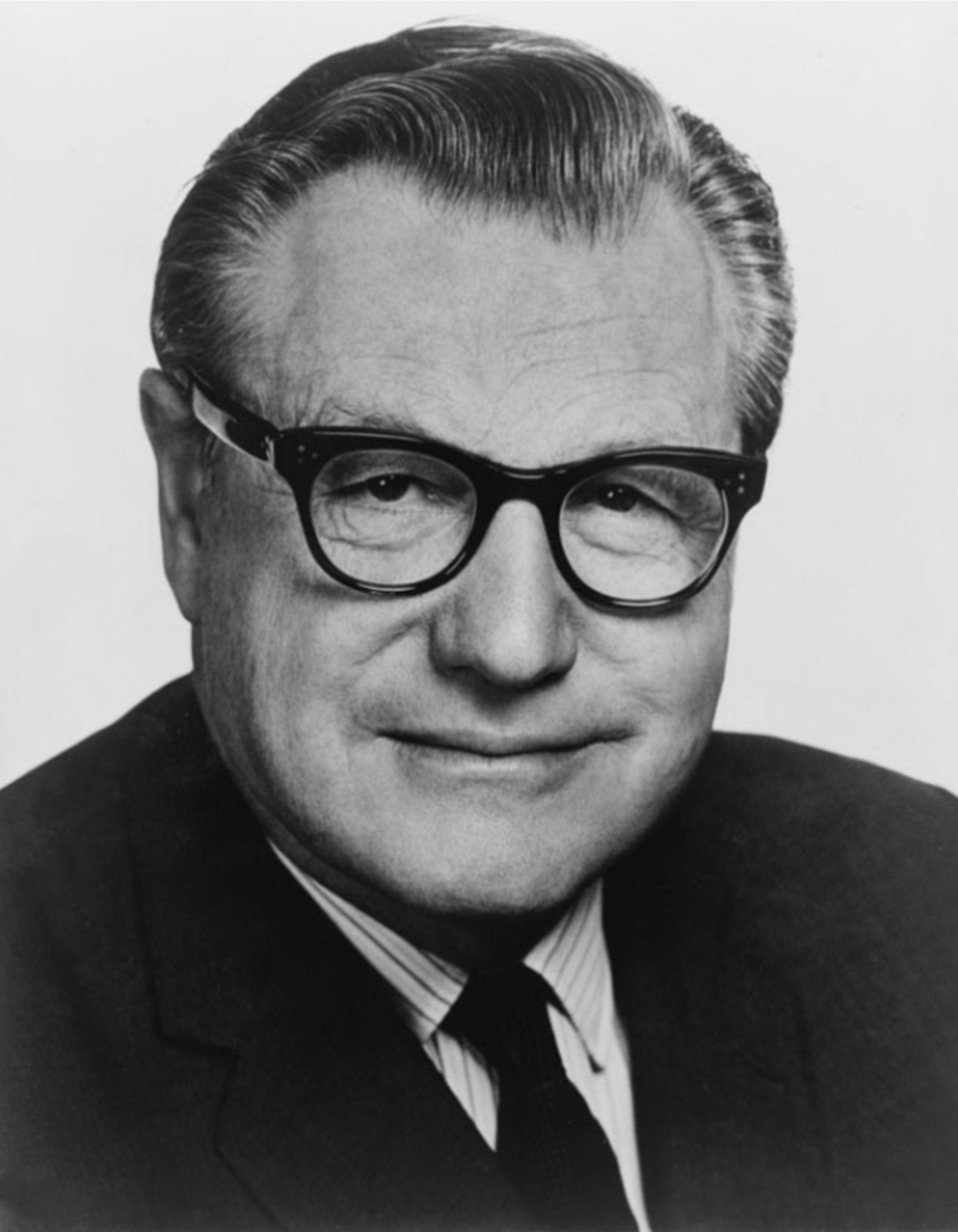

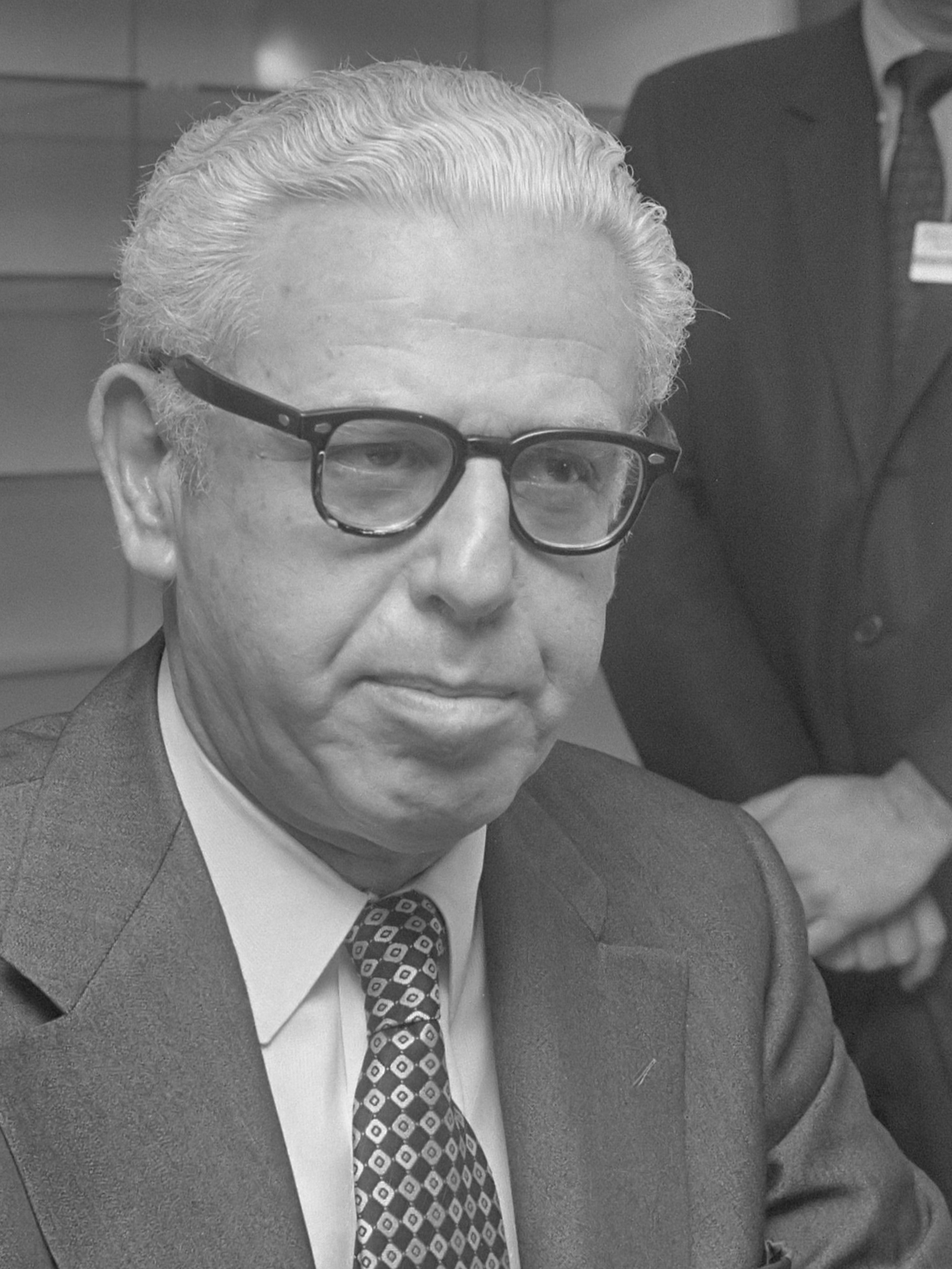

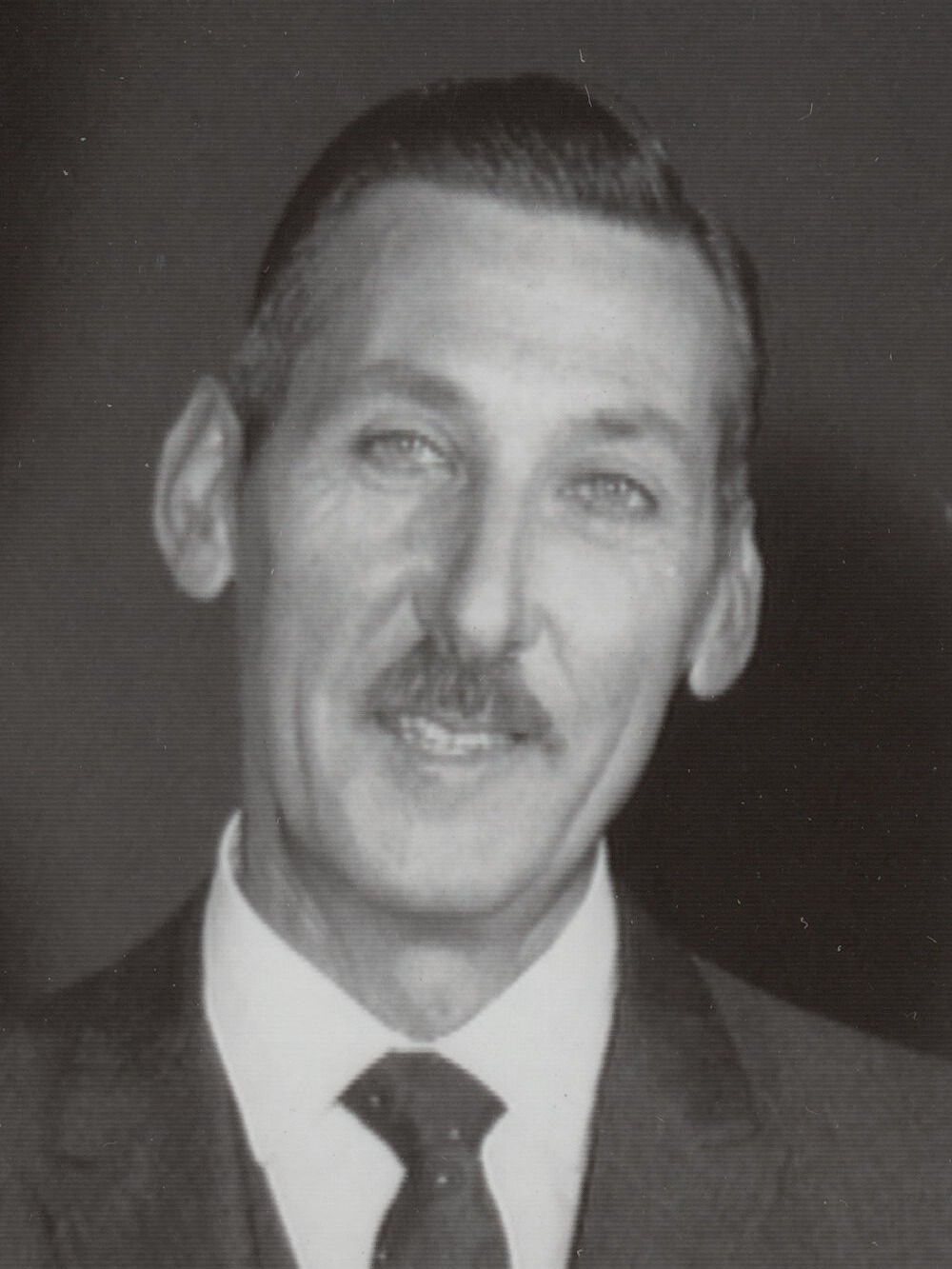
| Nominee | Nelson Rockefeller | Arthur Goldberg | Paul L. Adams |
| Party | Republican | Democratic | Conservative |
| Alliance | Civil Service Independent | Liberal |
| Running mate | Malcolm Wilson | Basil Paterson | Edward F. Leonard |
| Popular vote | 3,151,432 | 2,421,426 | 422,514 |
| Percentage | 52.41% | 40.27% | 7.03% |
- County results Rockefeller: 40–50% 50–60% 60–70% Goldberg: 40–50% 50–60%
Governor before election
Nelson Rockefeller
Republican
Elected Governor
Nelson Rockefeller
Republican

In New York, Governor Nelson A. Rockefeller won re-election to a fourth term. Rockefeller served until 1973, when he resigned.

== Ohio ==
1970 Ohio gubernatorial election
- November 3, 1970
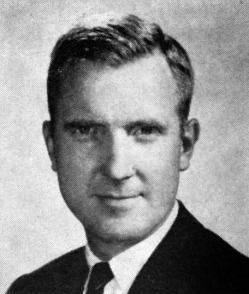

| Nominee | John J. Gilligan | Roger Cloud |
| Party | Democratic | Republican |
| Popular vote | 1,725,560 | 1,382,659 |
| Percentage | 54.19% | 43.42% |
- County results Gilligan: 40–50% 50–60% 60–70% Cloud: 40–50% 50–60% 60–70%
Governor before election
Jim Rhodes
Republican
Elected Governor
John J. Gilligan
Democratic

== Oklahoma ==
1970 Oklahoma gubernatorial election
- November 3, 1970
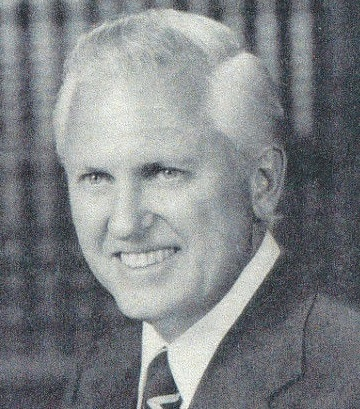

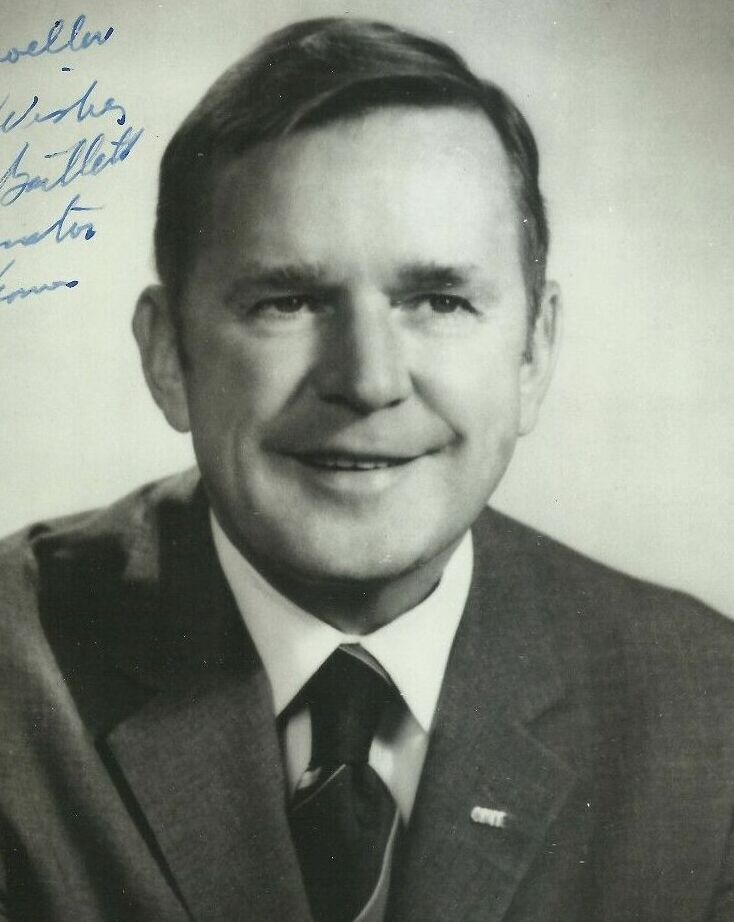
| Nominee | David Hall | Dewey F. Bartlett |
| Party | Democratic | Republican |
| Popular vote | 338,338 | 336,157 |
| Percentage | 48.42% | 48.11% |
- County results Hall: 40–50% 50–60% 60–70% 70–80% Bartlett: 40–50% 50–60% 60–70%
Governor before election
Dewey F. Bartlett
Republican
Elected Governor
David Hall
Democratic

== Oregon ==
1970 Oregon gubernatorial election
- November 3, 1970
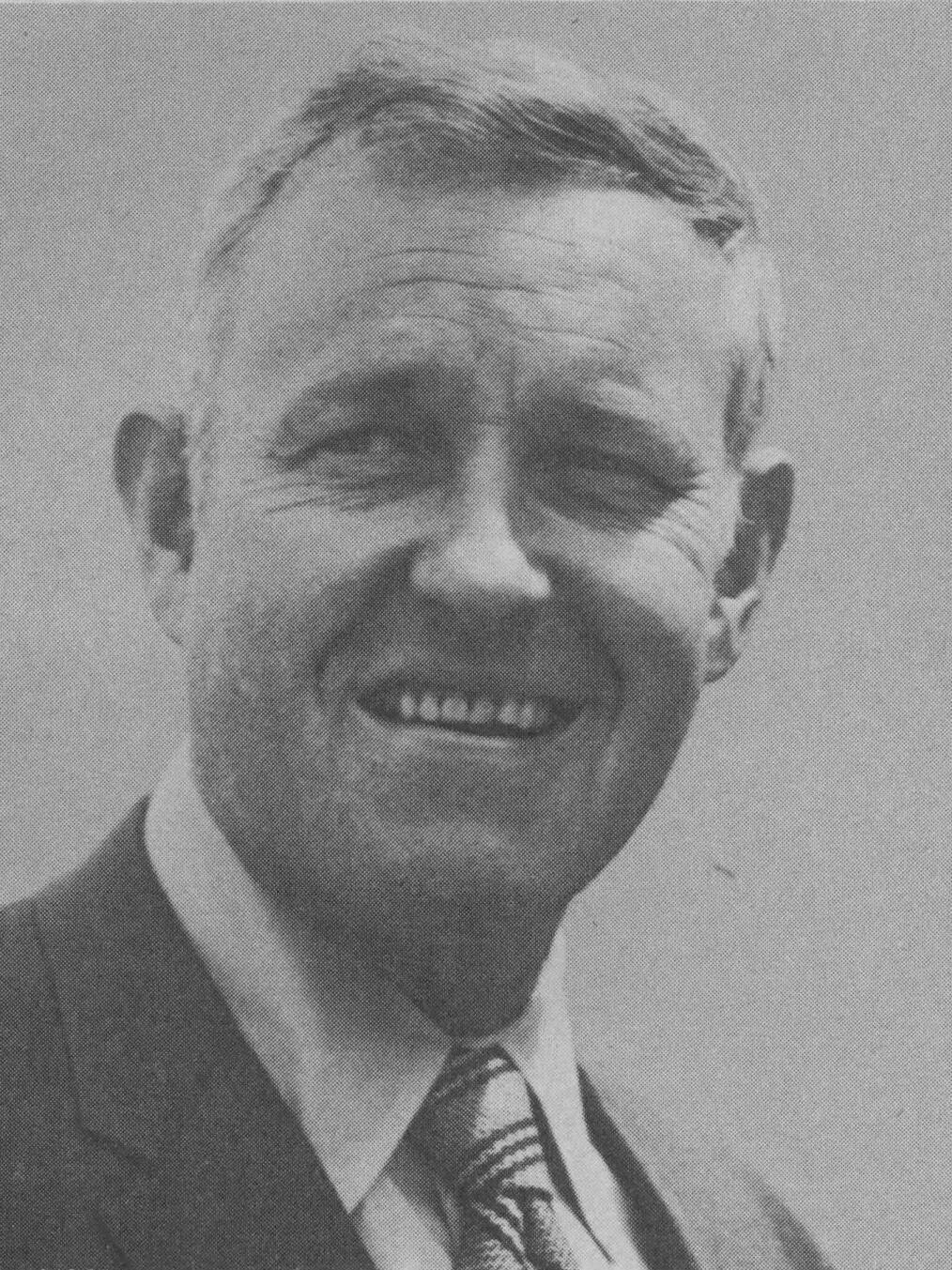

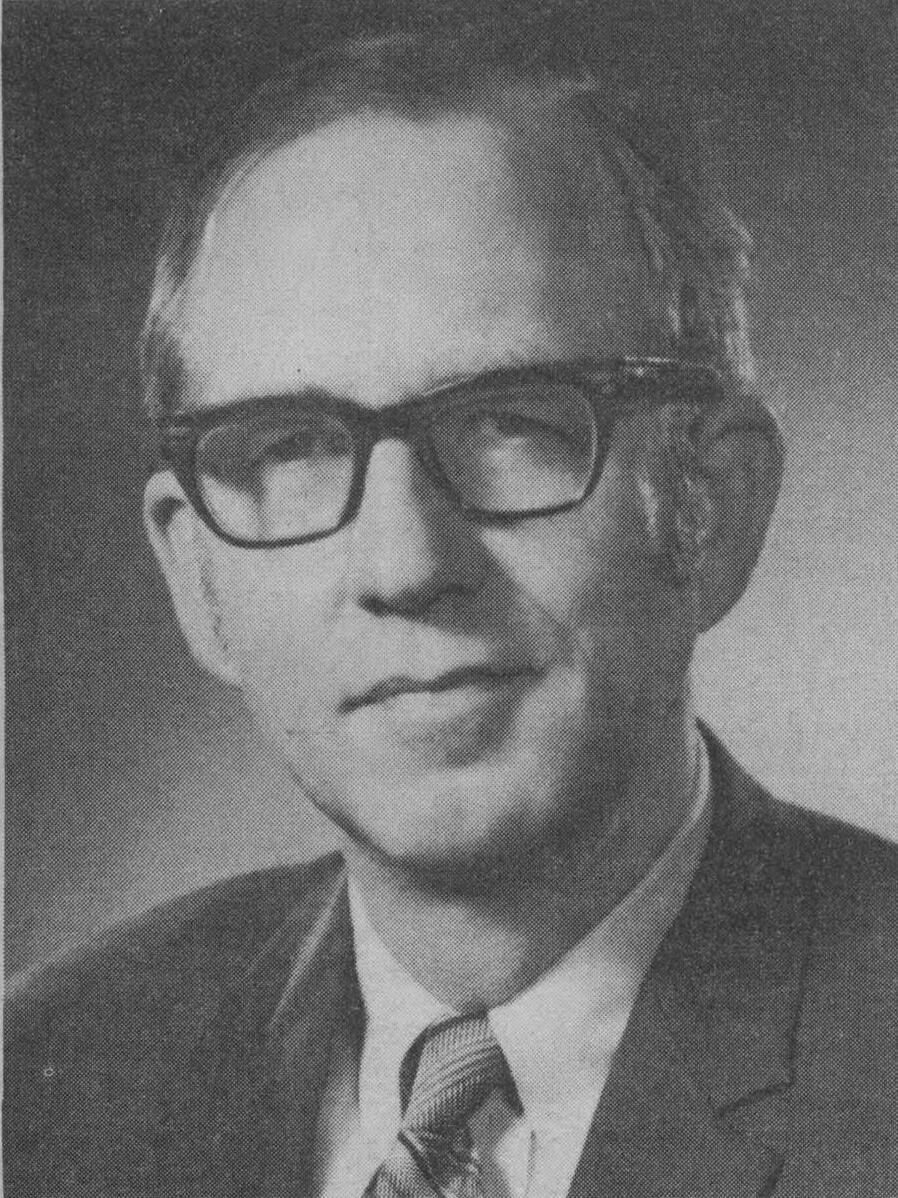
| Nominee | Tom McCall | Robert Straub |
| Party | Republican | Democratic |
| Popular vote | 369,964 | 293,892 |
| Percentage | 55.52% | 44.10% |
- County results McCall: 50–60% 60–70% Straub: 40–50% 50–60% 60–70%
Governor before election
Tom McCall
Republican
Elected Governor
Tom McCall
Republican

== Pennsylvania ==
1970 Pennsylvania gubernatorial election
- November 3, 1970
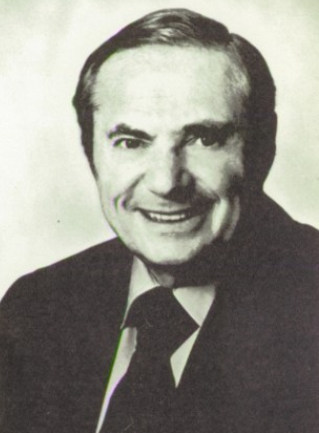

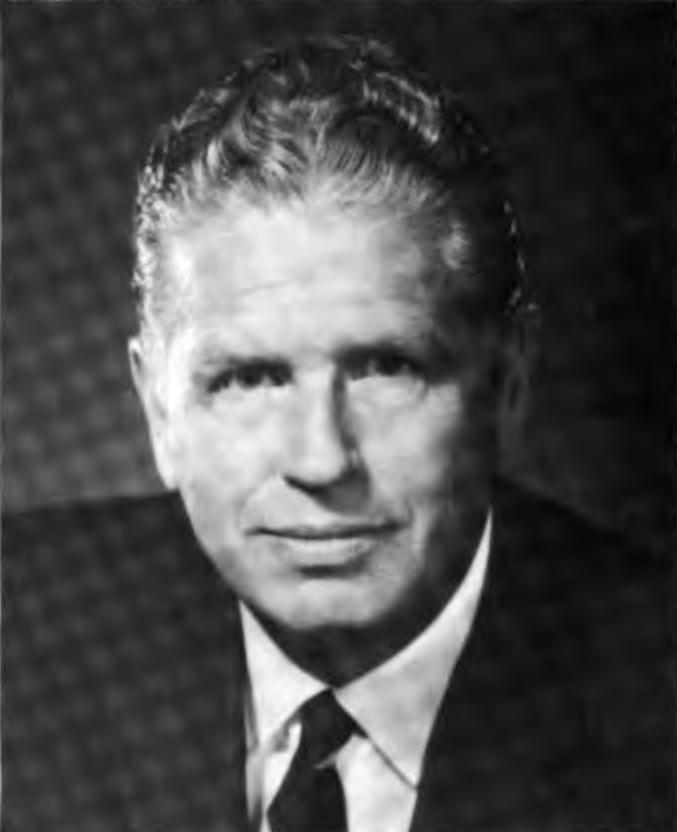
| Nominee | Milton Shapp | Ray Broderick |
| Party | Democratic | Republican |
| Running mate | Ernie Kline | Ralph Scalera |
| Popular vote | 2,043,029 | 1,542,854 |
| Percentage | 55.30% | 41.76% |
- County results Shapp: 40–50% 50–60% 60–70% Broderick: 40–50% 50–60% 60–70%
Governor before election
Raymond Shafer
Republican
Elected Governor
Milton Shapp
Democratic

In Pennsylvania, although the constitution was changed to allow governors to have two consecutive terms, the rule didn't apply to the then-current Gov. Raymond P. Shafer. The election was won by Milton Shapp.

== Rhode Island ==
1970 Rhode Island gubernatorial election
- November 3, 1970
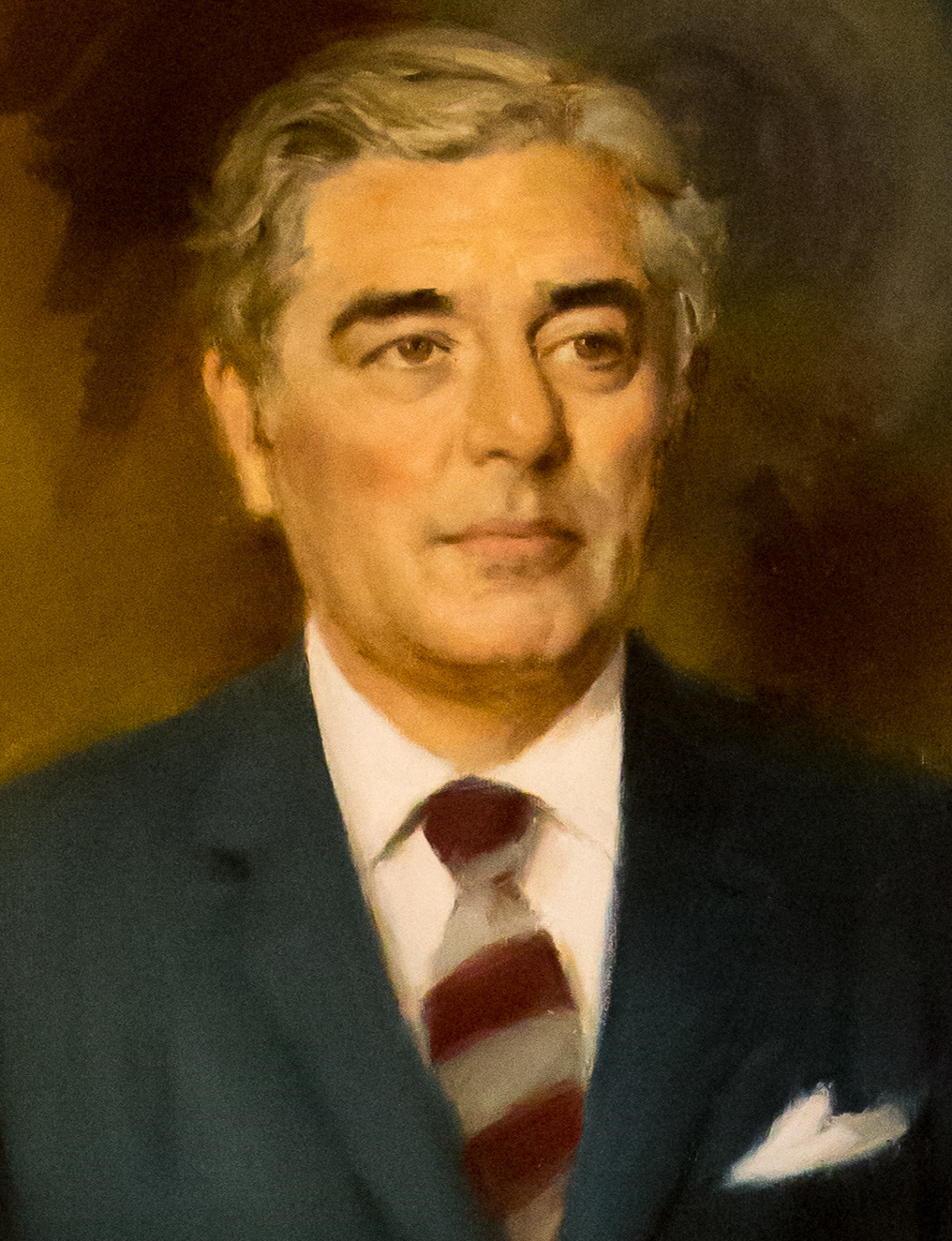

| Nominee | Frank Licht | Herbert DeSimone |
| Party | Democratic | Republican |
| Popular vote | 173,420 | 171,549 |
| Percentage | 50.07% | 49.53% |
- Licht: 50–60% DeSimone: 50–60% 60–70% 70–80%
Governor before election
Frank Licht
Democratic
Elected Governor
Frank Licht
Democratic

== South Carolina ==
1970 South Carolina gubernatorial election
- November 3, 1970
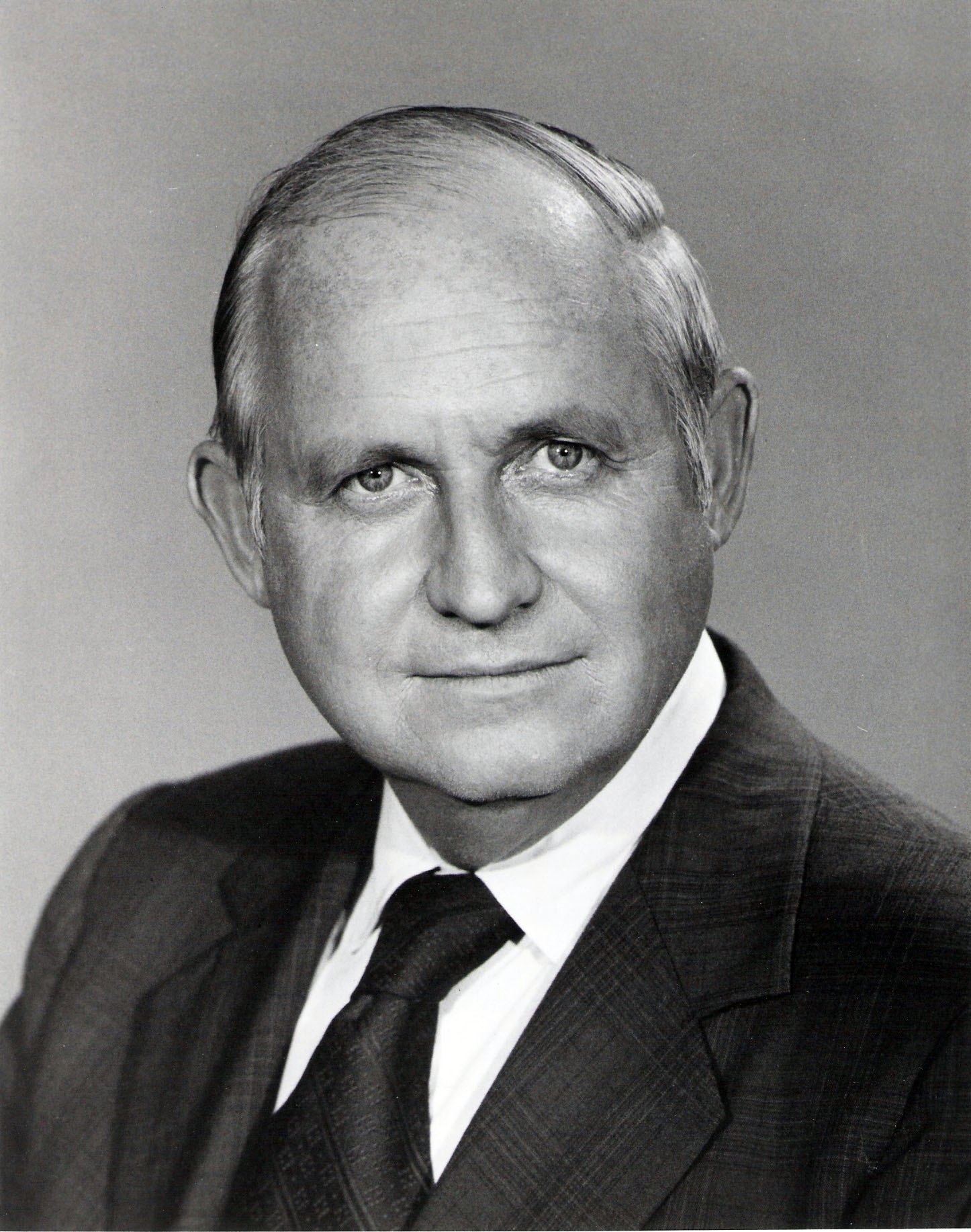

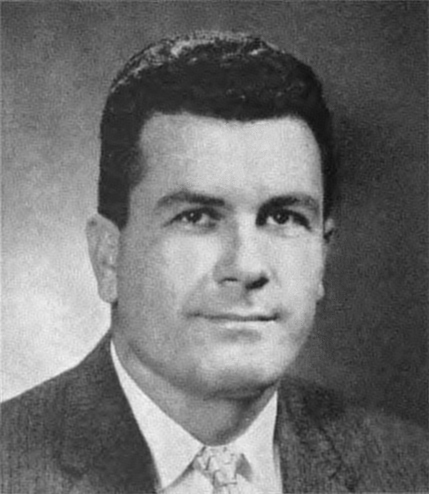
| Nominee | John C. West | Albert Watson |
| Party | Democratic | Republican |
| Popular vote | 251,151 | 221,236 |
| Percentage | 52.1% | 45.9% |
- County results West: 40–50% 50–60% 60–70% 70–80% Watson: 40–50% 50–60% 60–70%
Governor before election
Robert Evander McNair
Democratic
Elected Governor
John Carl West
Democratic

Democrat John C. West won the election.

== South Dakota ==
1970 South Dakota gubernatorial election
- November 3, 1970
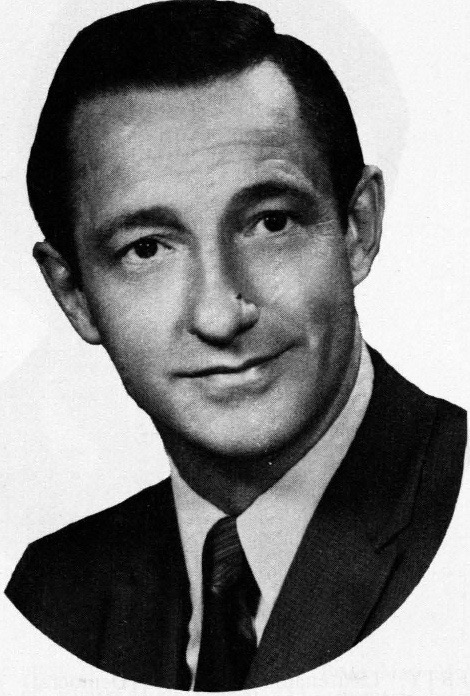

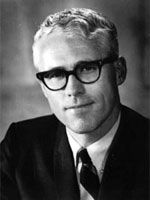
| Nominee | Richard F. Kneip | Frank Farrar |
| Party | Democratic | Republican |
| Popular vote | 131,616 | 108,347 |
| Percentage | 54.85% | 45.15% |
- County results Kneip: 50–60% 60–70% Farrar: 50–60% 60–70% 70–80%
Governor before election
Frank Farrar
Republican
Elected Governor
Richard F. Kneip
Democratic

South Dakota had governors on two-year terms until 1972, when a constitutional amendment allowed the governor to have a four-year term. Richard F. Kneip would be the first governor to be elected to a four-year term, though he resigned to accept an appointment. Kneip, elected governor for a two-year term this year (1970), would be re-elected for another two-year term in 1972.

== Tennessee ==
1970 Tennessee gubernatorial election
- November 3, 1970

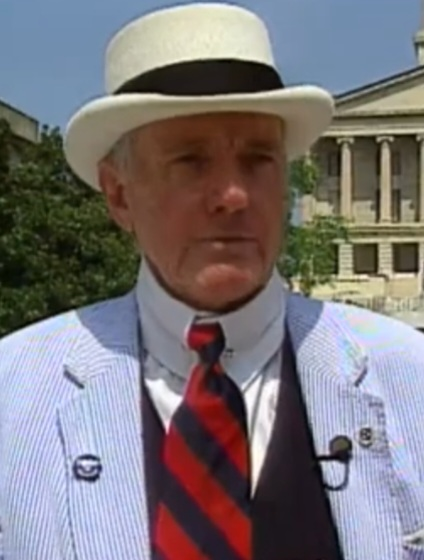
| Nominee | Winfield Dunn | John Jay Hooker |
| Party | Republican | Democratic |
| Popular vote | 575,777 | 509,521 |
| Percentage | 51.95% | 45.98% |
- Winfield: 40–50% 50–60% 60–70% 70–80% Hooker: 40–50% 50–60% 60–70% 70–80%
Governor before election
Buford Ellington
Democratic
Elected Governor
Winfield Dunn
Republican

Republican Winfield Dunn was elected in 1970.

== Texas ==
1970 Texas gubernatorial election
- November 3, 1970
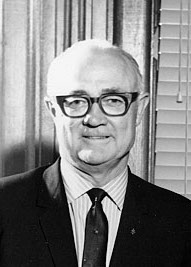

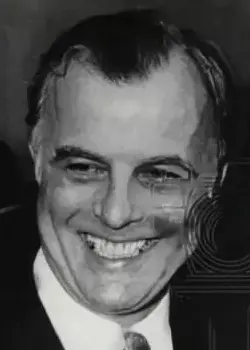
| Nominee | Preston Smith | Paul Eggers |
| Party | Democratic | Republican |
| Popular vote | 1,232,506 | 1,073,831 |
| Percentage | 53.4% | 46.6% |
- County results Smith: 50–60% 60–70% 70–80% 80–90% >90% Eggers: 50–60% 60–70%
Governor before election
Preston Smith
Democratic
Elected Governor
Preston Smith
Democratic

== Vermont ==
1970 Vermont gubernatorial election
- November 3, 1970
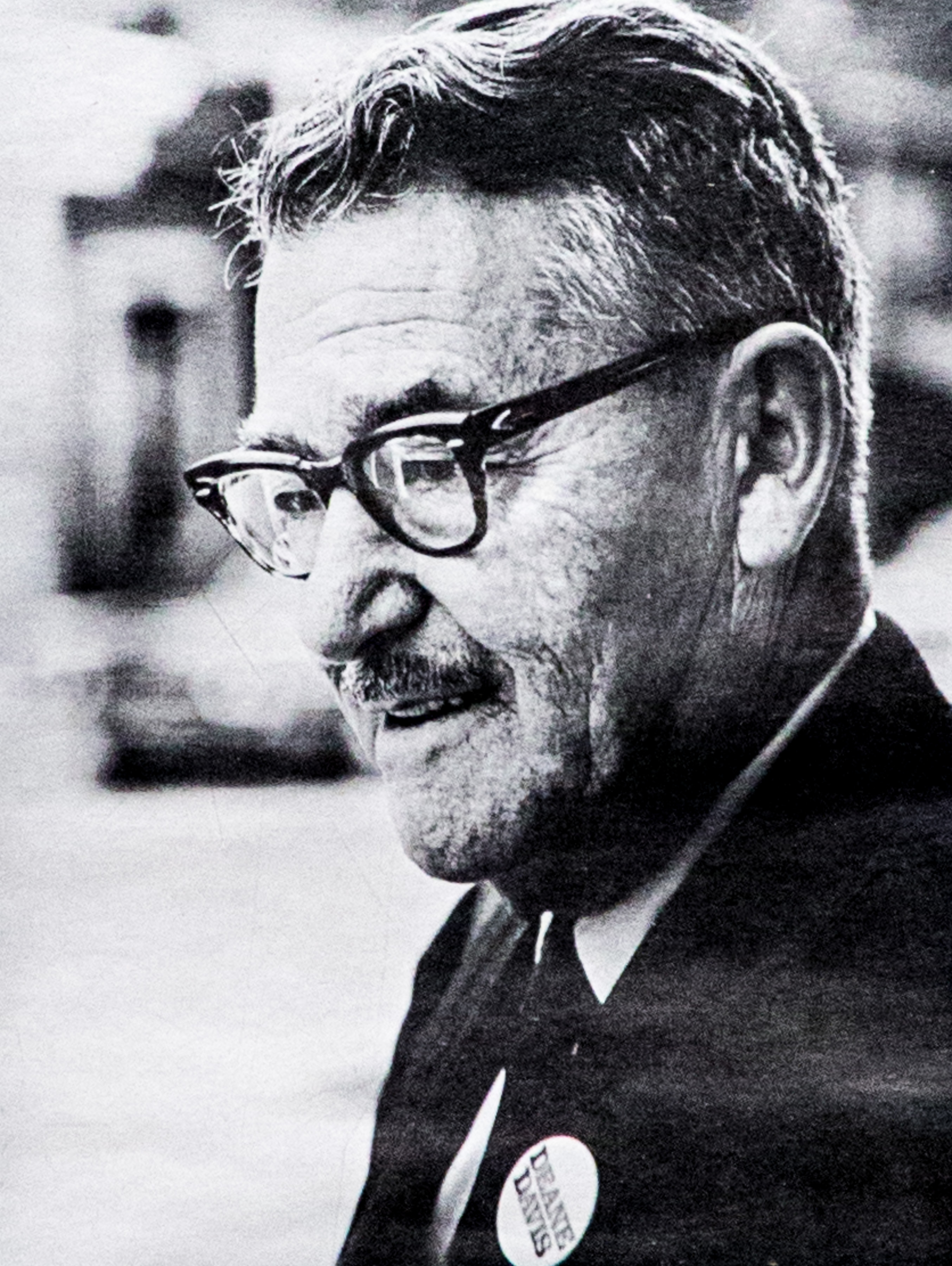

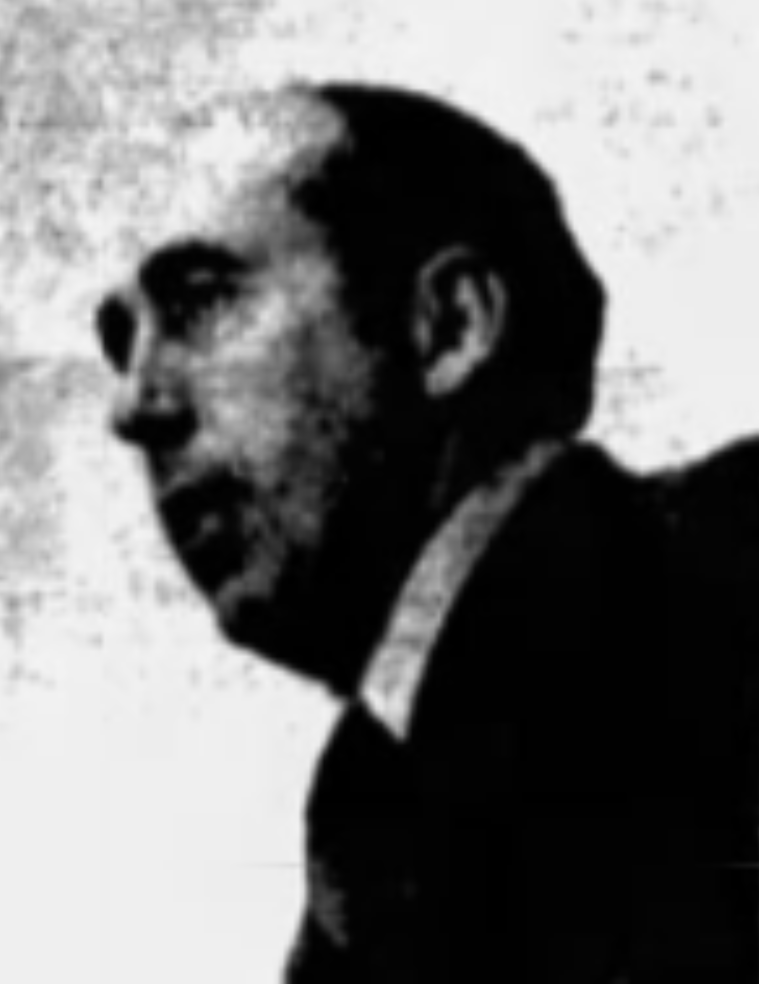
| Nominee | Deane C. Davis | Leo O'Brien Jr. |
| Party | Republican | Democratic |
| Popular vote | 87,458 | 66,028 |
| Percentage | 57.0% | 43.0% |
- Davis: 50–60% 60–70% 70–80% 80–90% >90% O'Brien: 50–60% 60–70% 70–80% Tie: 50%
Governor before election
Deane C. Davis
Republican
Elected Governor
Deane C. Davis
Republican

== Wisconsin ==
1970 Wisconsin gubernatorial election
- November 3, 1970
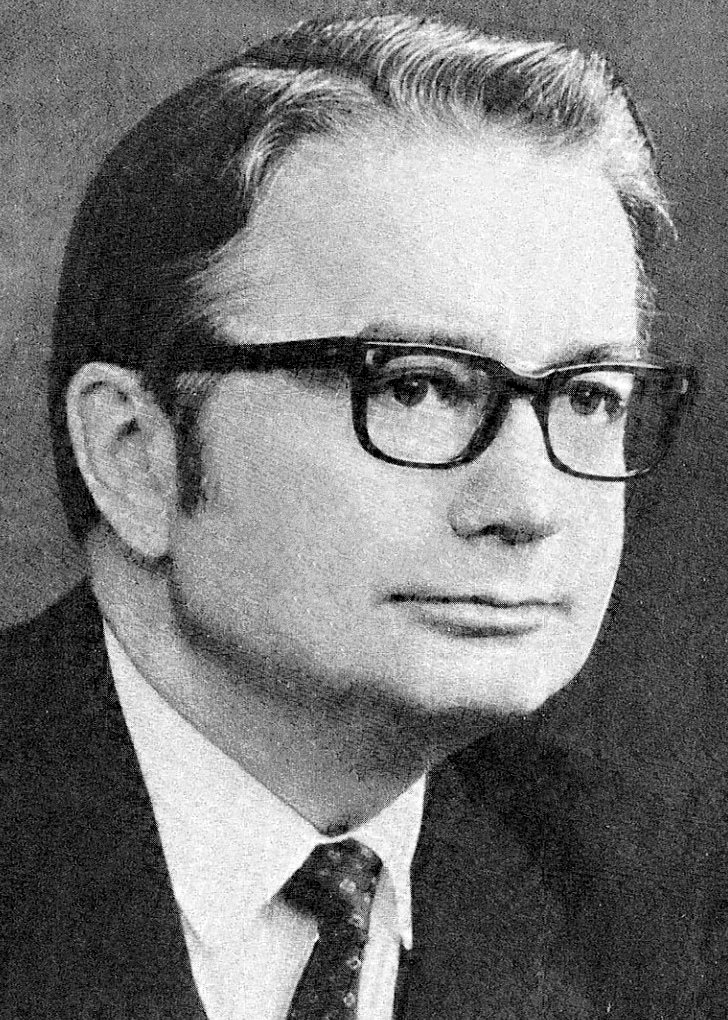

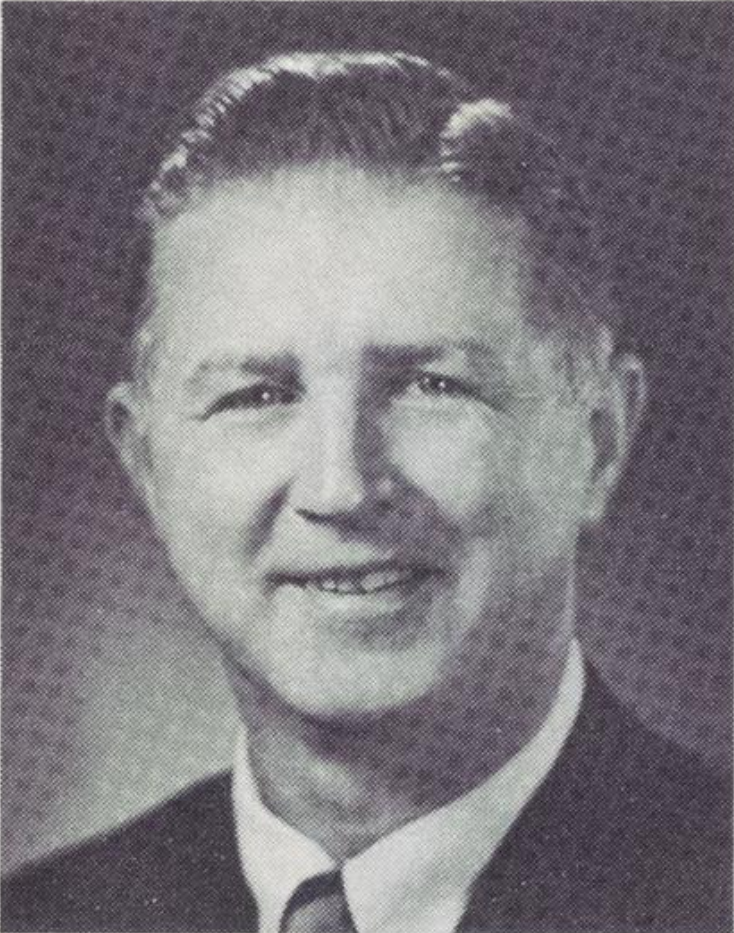
| Nominee | Patrick Lucey | Jack B. Olson |
| Party | Democratic | Republican |
| Running mate | Martin J. Schreiber | David O. Martin |
| Popular vote | 728,403 | 602,617 |
| Percentage | 54.24% | 44.88% |
- County results Lucey: 40–50% 50–60% 60–70% 70–80% Olson: 40–50% 50–60% 60–70%
Governor before election
Warren P. Knowles
Republican
Elected Governor
Patrick J. Lucey
Democratic

In 1968, Wisconsin changed its constitution from a two-year term for governor to a four-year term, and had the governor run on the same ticket as the Lieutenant Governor. Patrick Lucey would become the first governor to serve under this new system.

== Wyoming ==
1970 Wyoming gubernatorial election
- November 3, 1970
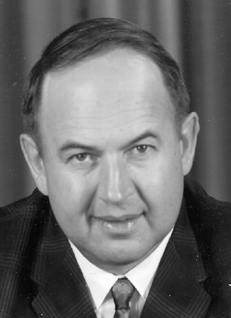

| Nominee | Stanley Hathaway | John J. Rooney |
| Party | Republican | Democratic |
| Popular vote | 74,249 | 44,008 |
| Percentage | 62.79% | 37.21% |
- County results Hathaway: 50–60% 60–70% 70–80% 80–90% Rooney: 50–60%
Governor before election
Stanley Hathaway
Republican
Elected Governor
Stanley Hathaway
Republican

Governor Stanley K. Hathaway won re-election to a second four-year term.

== Territories ==
=== Guam ===
Guam election
| Party | Candidate | Votes | % |
|---|---|---|---|
| Republican | Carlos Camacho | | 55.80% |
| Democratic | Ricardo Bordallo | | 44.20% |
| Total votes | | | 100.00% |
| Republican hold | | | |

=== U.S. Virgin Islands ===
U.S. Virgin Islands election
| Party | Candidate | Votes | % |
|---|---|---|---|
| Republican | Melvin H. Evans | 8,259 | 52.54% |
| Independent Citizens Movement | Cyril King | 7,462 | 47.46% |
| Total votes | | 15,721 | 100.00% |
| Republican hold | | | |

== See also ==
- 1970 United States elections
  - 1970 United States Senate elections
  - 1970 United States House of Representatives elections
- 1970 in the United States
