= 1970 Wisconsin gubernatorial election =

- November 3, 1970
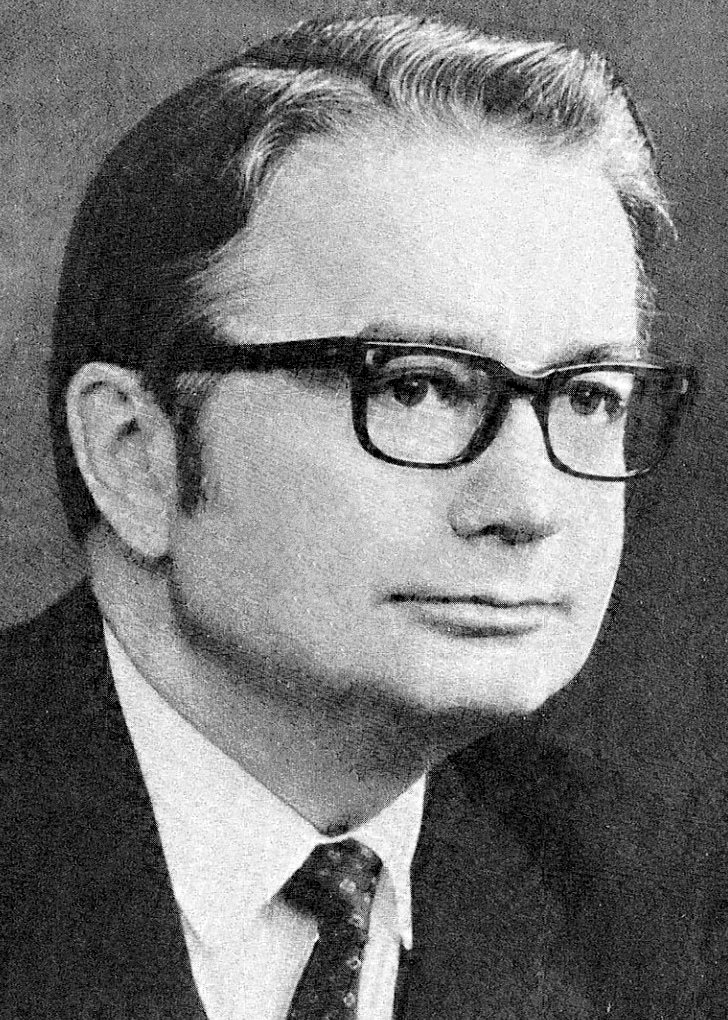

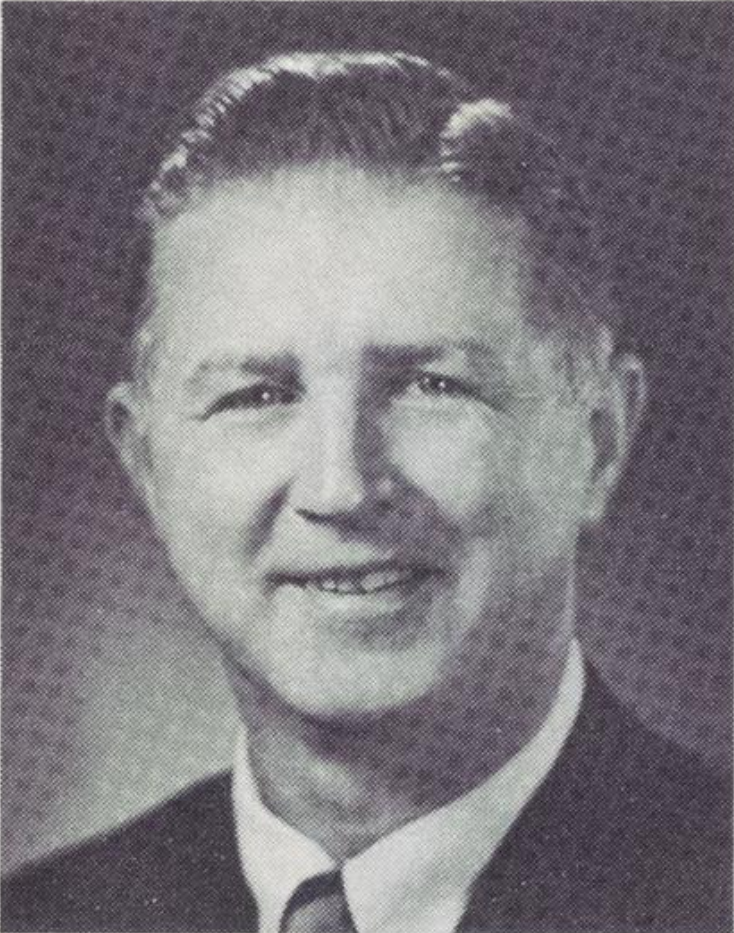
Nominee	Patrick Lucey	Jack B. Olson
Party	Democratic	Republican
Running mate	Martin J. Schreiber	David O. Martin
Popular vote	728,403	602,617
Percentage	54.24%	44.88%
- County results Lucey: 40–50% 50–60% 60–70% 70–80% Olson: 40–50% 50–60% 60–70%
Governor before election
Warren P. Knowles
Republican
Elected Governor
Patrick J. Lucey
Democratic

The 1970 Wisconsin gubernatorial election was held on November 3, 1970. Democrat Patrick J. Lucey won the election with 54.23% of the vote, winning his first term as Governor of Wisconsin and defeating incumbent lieutenant governor, Republican Jack B. Olson. Roman R. Blenski unsuccessfully sought the Republican nomination. As of 2024, this is the last time the Democratic gubernatorial candidate carried Oconto County.

This was the first gubernatorial election in Wisconsin where the governor was elected to a four year term on the same ticket as the Lieutenant Governor.

The primary election was held on September 8, 1970. Nominees for Governor and Lieutenant Governor were selected in separate primaries before running on a joint ticket in the general election.

== Republican party ==
=== Governor ===
==== Candidates ====
===== Nominee =====
- Jack B. Olson, Lieutenant Governor of Wisconsin

===== Eliminated in primary =====
- Roman Richard Blenski, former Democratic State senator from the 7th district (1949–1955) and perennial candidate

==== Results ====
Republican gubernatorial primary results
Party	Candidate	Votes	%
Republican	Jack B. Olson	203,434	91.43%
Republican	Roman Richard Blenski	19,061	8.57%
Total votes		222,495	100.00%

=== Lieutenant Governor ===
==== Candidates ====
===== Nominee =====
- David O. Martin, State representative from Winnebago County's 3rd district (1961–1971)

==== Results ====
Republican lieutenant gubernatorial primary results
Party	Candidate	Votes	%
Republican	David O. Martin	192,005	100.00%
Total votes		192,005	100.00%

== Democratic party ==
=== Governor ===
==== Candidates ====
===== Nominee =====
- Patrick J. Lucey, former Lieutenant Governor and nominee for governor in 1966

===== Eliminated in primary =====
- Edward Ihlenfeldt
- Donald O. Peterson, manager of Eugene McCarthy’s 1968 presidential campaign in Wisconsin

==== Results ====
Democratic gubernatorial primary results
Party	Candidate	Votes	%
Democratic	Patrick J. Lucey	177,584	60.66%
Democratic	Donald O. Peterson	105,849	36.16%
Democratic	Edward Ihlenfeldt	9,312	3.18%
Total votes		292,745	100.00%

=== Lieutenant Governor ===
==== Candidates ====
===== Nominee =====
- Martin J. Schreiber, State senator from the 6th district (1963–1971)

===== Eliminated in primary =====
- Harry Halloway
- Frank Nikolay, Former Assembly majority leader (1965–1967) from the Clark County district (1959–1967; 1969–1971)
- John F. O'Malley
- Jay G. Sykes, educator

==== Results ====
Democratic lieutenant gubernatorial primary results
Party	Candidate	Votes	%
Democratic	Martin J. Schreiber	128,038	47.22%
Democratic	Frank Nikolay	54,374	20.05%
Democratic	John F. O'Malley	36,544	13.48%
Democratic	Jay G. Sykes	35,984	13.27%
Democratic	Harry Halloway	16,191	5.97%
Total votes		271,131	100.00%

== American party ==
=== Governor ===
==== Candidates ====
- Leo James McDonald

==== Results ====
American gubernatorial primary results
Party	Candidate	Votes	%
American	Leo James McDonald	2,729	100.00%
Total votes		2,729	100.00%

=== Lieutenant Governor ===
==== Candidates ====
- Theodore G. Kothe

==== Results ====
American lieutenant gubernatorial primary results
Party	Candidate	Votes	%
American	Theodore G. Kothe	2,512	100.00%
Total votes		2,512	100.00%

== General election ==
=== Candidates ===
- Patrick J. Lucey & Martin J. Schreiber, Democrat
- Jack B. Olson & David O. Martin, Republican
- Leo James McDonald & Theodore Kothe, American
- Georgia Cozzini & Denis Kitchen, Independent
- Samuel K. Hunt & Peter J. Kohlenberg, Independent
- Myrtle Kastner & Russell Chabot, Independent

=== Results ===
1970 Wisconsin gubernatorial election
Party	Candidate	Votes	%	±%
Democratic	Patrick J. Lucey Martin J. Schreiber	728,403	54.23%	+7.41%
Republican	Jack B. Olson David Martin	602,617	44.87%	−8.01%
American	Leo James McDonald Theodore Kothe	9,035	0.67%	
Independent	Georgia Cozzini Denis Kitchen	1,287	0.10%	
Independent	Samuel K. Hunt Peter J. Kohlenberg	888	0.07%	
Independent	Myrtle Kastner Russell Chabot	628	0.05%	
	Scattering (Note: These are not listed in the Blue Book but are listed in the Board of Canvassers report.)	302	0.02%	
Majority		125,786	9.36%	
Total votes		1,343,160	100.00%	
Democratic gain from Republican		Swing	+15.42%	

=== Results by county ===
Lucey was the first Democrat since William A. Barstow in 1855 to win Dunn County.

County	Patrick J. Lucey Democratic		Jack B. Olson Republican		All Others Various		Margin		Total votes cast
County	#	%	#	%	#	%	#	%	Total votes cast
Adams	1,560	53.12%	1,358	46.24%	19	0.65%	202	6.88%	2,937
Ashland	3,541	66.72%	1,708	32.18%	58	1.09%	1,833	34.54%	5,307
Barron	5,052	49.83%	5,045	49.76%	42	0.41%	7	0.07%	10,139
Bayfield	2,977	64.38%	1,623	35.10%	24	0.52%	1,354	29.28%	4,624
Brown	23,869	52.00%	21,395	46.61%	636	1.39%	2,474	5.39%	45,900
Buffalo	1,890	52.66%	1,693	47.17%	6	0.17%	197	5.49%	3,589
Burnett	1,999	58.42%	1,413	41.29%	10	0.29%	586	17.12%	3,422
Calumet	4,295	50.49%	4,174	49.07%	37	0.43%	121	1.42%	8,506
Chippewa	7,523	60.37%	4,863	39.03%	75	0.60%	2,660	21.35%	12,461
Clark	5,017	53.17%	4,345	46.05%	73	0.77%	672	7.12%	9,435
Columbia	5,592	42.26%	7,542	57.00%	98	0.74%	-1,950	-14.74%	13,232
Crawford	2,298	43.43%	2,517	47.57%	476	9.00%	-219	-4.14%	5,291
Dane	49,868	55.89%	38,078	42.68%	1,272	1.43%	11,790	13.21%	89,218
Dodge	9,510	46.81%	10,683	52.58%	124	0.61%	-1,173	-5.77%	20,317
Door	3,014	41.88%	4,153	57.70%	30	0.42%	-1,139	-15.83%	7,197
Douglas	10,608	70.92%	4,255	28.45%	94	0.63%	6,353	42.48%	14,957
Dunn	3,963	51.03%	3,770	48.54%	33	0.42%	193	2.49%	7,766
Eau Claire	11,252	55.85%	8,787	43.61%	109	0.54%	2,465	12.23%	20,148
Florence	696	49.89%	695	49.82%	4	0.29%	1	0.07%	1,395
Fond du Lac	12,434	48.68%	12,872	50.39%	237	0.93%	-438	-1.71%	25,543
Forest	1,724	62.04%	1,043	37.53%	12	0.43%	681	24.51%	2,779
Grant	4,621	39.58%	6,846	58.64%	207	1.77%	-2,225	-19.06%	11,674
Green	2,894	37.59%	4,772	61.99%	32	0.42%	-1,878	-24.40%	7,698
Green Lake	2,343	40.06%	3,461	59.18%	44	0.75%	-1,118	-19.12%	5,848
Iowa	2,403	43.05%	3,141	56.27%	38	0.68%	-738	-13.22%	5,582
Iron	1,741	67.35%	832	32.19%	12	0.46%	909	35.16%	2,585
Jackson	2,592	54.88%	2,117	44.82%	14	0.30%	475	10.06%	4,723
Jefferson	9,034	47.08%	10,047	52.36%	108	0.56%	-1,013	-5.28%	19,189
Juneau	2,483	46.42%	2,825	52.81%	41	0.77%	-342	-6.39%	5,349
Kenosha	22,136	64.53%	11,944	34.82%	223	0.65%	10,192	29.71%	34,303
Kewaunee	3,100	52.38%	2,795	47.23%	23	0.39%	305	5.15%	5,918
La Crosse	11,639	46.04%	13,335	52.75%	305	1.21%	-1,696	-6.71%	25,279
Lafayette	2,414	42.39%	3,255	57.16%	26	0.46%	-841	-14.77%	5,695
Langlade	3,110	55.26%	2,488	44.21%	30	0.53%	622	11.05%	5,628
Lincoln	3,860	50.90%	3,667	48.36%	56	0.74%	193	2.55%	7,583
Manitowoc	15,975	59.24%	10,577	39.22%	414	1.54%	5,398	20.02%	26,966
Marathon	17,665	55.30%	13,903	43.52%	376	1.18%	3,762	11.78%	31,944
Marinette	6,358	51.66%	5,871	47.70%	78	0.63%	487	3.96%	12,307
Marquette	1,203	40.67%	1,735	58.65%	20	0.68%	-532	-17.99%	2,958
Menominee	485	73.48%	169	25.61%	6	0.91%	316	47.88%	660
Milwaukee	196,941	63.55%	110,436	35.64%	2,518	0.81%	86,505	27.91%	309,895
Monroe	3,694	45.31%	4,403	54.01%	55	0.67%	-709	-8.70%	8,152
Oconto	4,321	50.99%	4,101	48.39%	53	0.63%	220	2.60%	8,475
Oneida	4,401	50.69%	4,224	48.65%	58	0.67%	177	2.04%	8,683
Outagamie	15,855	47.37%	17,318	51.74%	295	0.88%	-1,463	-4.37%	33,468
Ozaukee	6,830	39.78%	10,184	59.31%	156	0.91%	-3,354	-19.53%	17,170
Pepin	1,126	54.66%	924	44.85%	10	0.49%	202	9.81%	2,060
Pierce	3,769	52.91%	3,344	46.95%	10	0.14%	425	5.97%	7,123
Polk	4,616	52.33%	4,180	47.39%	25	0.28%	436	4.94%	8,821
Portage	9,580	66.02%	4,797	33.06%	134	0.92%	4,783	32.96%	14,511
Price	3,137	55.38%	2,500	44.14%	27	0.48%	637	11.25%	5,664
Racine	30,086	57.79%	21,573	41.44%	399	0.77%	8,513	16.35%	52,058
Richland	2,368	39.80%	3,444	57.88%	138	2.32%	-1,076	-18.08%	5,950
Rock	20,358	51.77%	18,689	47.53%	275	0.70%	1,669	4.24%	39,322
Rusk	2,540	57.87%	1,819	41.44%	30	0.68%	721	16.43%	4,389
Sauk	5,601	43.85%	7,036	55.09%	135	1.06%	-1,435	-11.24%	12,772
Sawyer	1,703	49.52%	1,716	49.90%	20	0.58%	-13	-0.38%	3,439
Shawano	4,696	43.59%	6,027	55.95%	49	0.45%	-1,331	-12.36%	10,772
Sheboygan	17,697	51.87%	16,077	47.12%	344	1.01%	1,620	4.75%	34,118
St. Croix	5,045	52.56%	4,534	47.24%	19	0.20%	511	5.32%	9,598
Taylor	2,019	50.83%	1,896	47.73%	57	1.44%	123	3.10%	3,972
Trempealeau	4,038	55.13%	3,266	44.59%	20	0.27%	772	10.54%	7,324
Vernon	3,688	45.87%	4,251	52.87%	101	1.26%	-563	-7.00%	8,040
Vilas	2,185	43.62%	2,795	55.80%	29	0.58%	-610	-12.18%	5,009
Walworth	7,789	41.52%	10,903	58.12%	66	0.35%	-3,114	-16.60%	18,758
Washburn	2,319	54.78%	1,896	44.79%	18	0.43%	423	9.99%	4,233
Washington	9,686	49.78%	9,636	49.53%	134	0.69%	50	0.26%	19,456
Waukesha	32,969	46.77%	36,828	52.25%	689	0.98%	-3,859	-5.47%	70,486
Waupaca	4,302	38.84%	6,726	60.73%	47	0.42%	-2,424	-21.89%	11,075
Waushara	1,824	38.14%	2,933	61.32%	26	0.54%	-1,109	-23.19%	4,783
Winnebago	17,507	46.89%	19,286	51.66%	540	1.45%	-1,779	-4.77%	37,333
Wood	10,975	54.33%	9,083	44.97%	141	0.70%	1,892	9.37%	20,199
Total	728,403	54.23%	602,617	44.87%	12,140	0.90%	125,786	9.36%	1,343,160

==== Counties that flipped from Republican to Democratic ====
- Barron
- Brown
- Buffalo
- Burnett
- Calumet
- Dane
- Dunn
- Eau Claire
- Florence
- Jackson
- Kewaunee
- Marinette
- Oconto
- Oneida
- Pepin
- Pierce
- Polk
- Price
- Racine
- Rock
- Sheboygan
- St. Croix
- Trempealeau
- Washburn
- Washington
