= 1960 Wisconsin lieutenant gubernatorial election =

- November 8, 1960
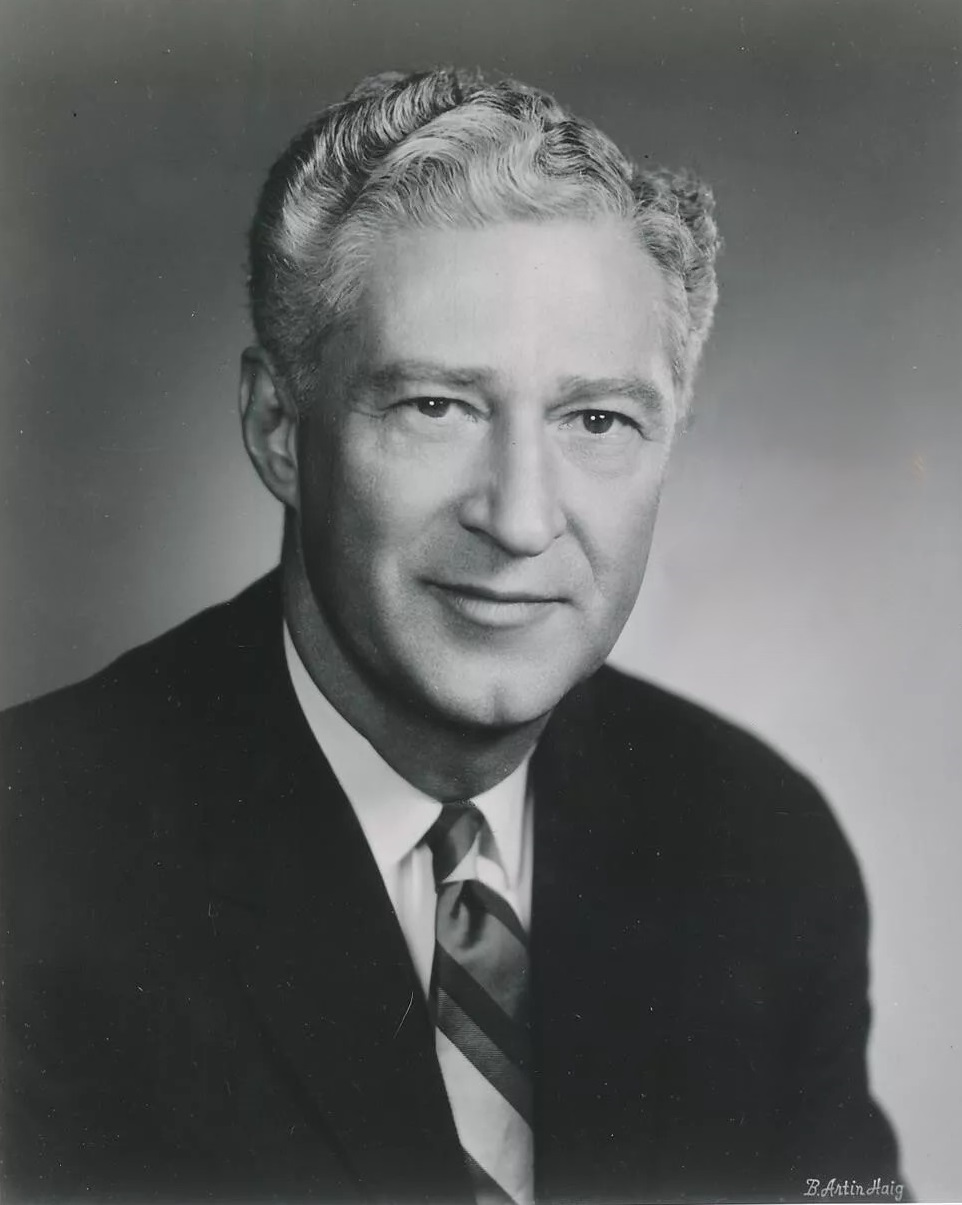

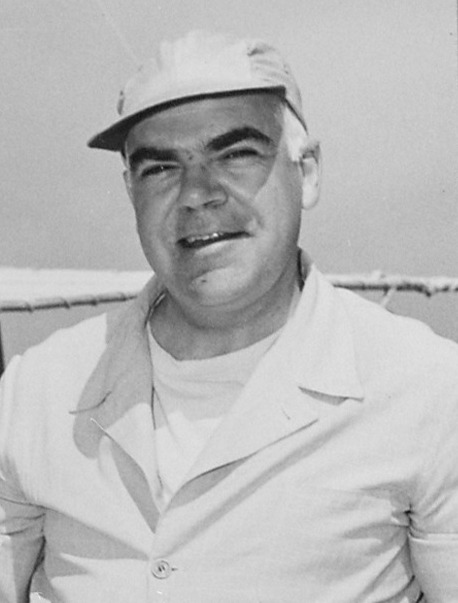
Nominee	Warren P. Knowles	Philleo Nash
Party	Republican	Democratic
Popular vote	866,697	806,549
Percentage	51.80%	48.20%
Lieutenant Governor before election
Philleo Nash
Democratic
Elected Lieutenant Governor
Warren P. Knowles
Republican

The 1960 Wisconsin lieutenant gubernatorial election was held on November 8, 1960, in order to elect the lieutenant governor of Wisconsin. Republican nominee and former lieutenant governor Warren P. Knowles defeated incumbent Democratic lieutenant governor Philleo Nash in a rematch of the previous election.

== Democratic primary ==
The Democratic primary election was held on September 13, 1960. Incumbent lieutenant governor Philleo Nash received a majority of the votes (56.12%), and was thus elected as the nominee for the general election.

=== Results ===
1960 Democratic lieutenant gubernatorial primary
Party	Candidate	Votes	%
Democratic	Philleo Nash	144,677	56.12%
Democratic	Jerome D. Grant	113,132	43.88%
Total votes		257,809	100.00%

== General election ==
On election day, November 8, 1960, Republican nominee and former lieutenant governor Warren P. Knowles won the election by a margin of 60,148 votes against his opponent incumbent Democratic lieutenant governor Philleo Nash, thereby gaining Republican control over the office of lieutenant governor. Knowles was sworn in for his third non-consecutive term on January 2, 1961.

=== Results ===
Wisconsin lieutenant gubernatorial election, 1960
Party	Candidate	Votes	%
Republican	Warren P. Knowles	866,697	51.80
Democratic	Philleo Nash (incumbent)	806,549	48.20
	Scattering	12	0.00
Total votes		1,673,258	100.00
Republican gain from Democratic			
