= 1962 Wisconsin lieutenant gubernatorial election =

- November 6, 1962

Nominee	Jack B. Olson	David Carley
Party	Republican	Democratic
Popular vote	617,475	605,095
Percentage	50.50%	49.49%
Lieutenant Governor before election
Warren P. Knowles
Republican
Elected Lieutenant Governor
Jack B. Olson
Republican

The 1962 Wisconsin lieutenant gubernatorial election was held on November 6, 1962, in order to elect the lieutenant governor of Wisconsin. Republican nominee Jack B. Olson defeated Democratic nominee David Carley.

== General election ==
On election day, November 6, 1962, Republican nominee Jack B. Olson won the election by a margin of 12,380 votes against his opponent Democratic nominee David Carley, thereby retaining Republican control over the office of lieutenant governor. Olson was sworn in as the 35th lieutenant governor of Wisconsin on January 7, 1963.

=== Results ===
Wisconsin lieutenant gubernatorial election, 1962
Party	Candidate	Votes	%
Republican	Jack B. Olson	617,475	50.50
Democratic	David Carley	605,095	49.49
	Scattering	89	0.01
Total votes		1,222,659	100.00
Republican hold			
