= 1966 Wisconsin lieutenant gubernatorial election =

- November 8, 1966

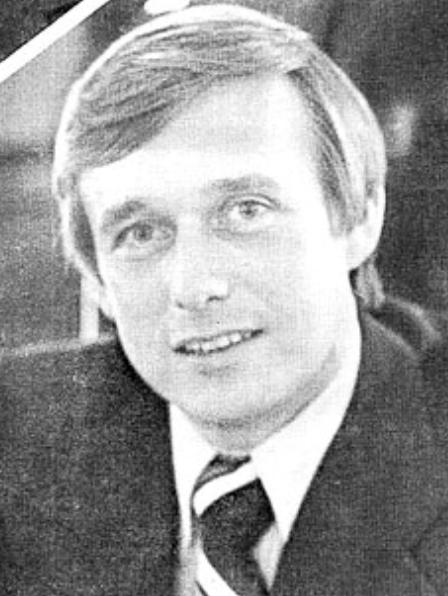
Nominee	Jack B. Olson	Martin J. Schreiber
Party	Republican	Democratic
Popular vote	629,232	513,781
Percentage	55.05%	44.95%
Lieutenant Governor before election
Patrick Lucey
Democratic
Elected Lieutenant Governor
Jack B. Olson
Republican

The 1966 Wisconsin lieutenant gubernatorial election was held on November 8, 1966, in order to elect the lieutenant governor of Wisconsin. Republican nominee and former lieutenant governor Jack B. Olson defeated Democratic nominee and incumbent member of the Wisconsin Senate Martin J. Schreiber.

== Democratic primary ==
The Democratic primary election was held on September 13, 1966. Incumbent member of the Wisconsin Senate Martin J. Schreiber received a majority of the votes (68.77%), and was thus elected as the nominee for the general election.

=== Results ===
1966 Democratic lieutenant gubernatorial primary
Party	Candidate	Votes	%
Democratic	Martin J. Schreiber	172,245	68.77%
Democratic	Jerome D. Grant	78,226	31.23%
Total votes		250,471	100.00%

== General election ==
On election day, November 8, 1966, Republican nominee and former lieutenant governor Jack B. Olson won the election by a margin of 115,451 votes against his opponent Democratic nominee Martin J. Schreiber, thereby gaining Republican control over the office of lieutenant governor. Olson was sworn in for his second non-consecutive term on January 2, 1967.

=== Results ===
Wisconsin lieutenant gubernatorial election, 1966
Party	Candidate	Votes	%
Republican	Jack B. Olson	629,232	55.05
Democratic	Martin J. Schreiber	513,781	44.95
Total votes		1,143,013	100.00
Republican gain from Democratic			
