= Rosenfels =

Rosenfels is a surname. Notable people with the surname include:

- Paul Rosenfels (1909–1985), American psychiatrist
- Sage Rosenfels (born 1978), American football player
