= 1964 Wisconsin lieutenant gubernatorial election =

- November 3, 1964
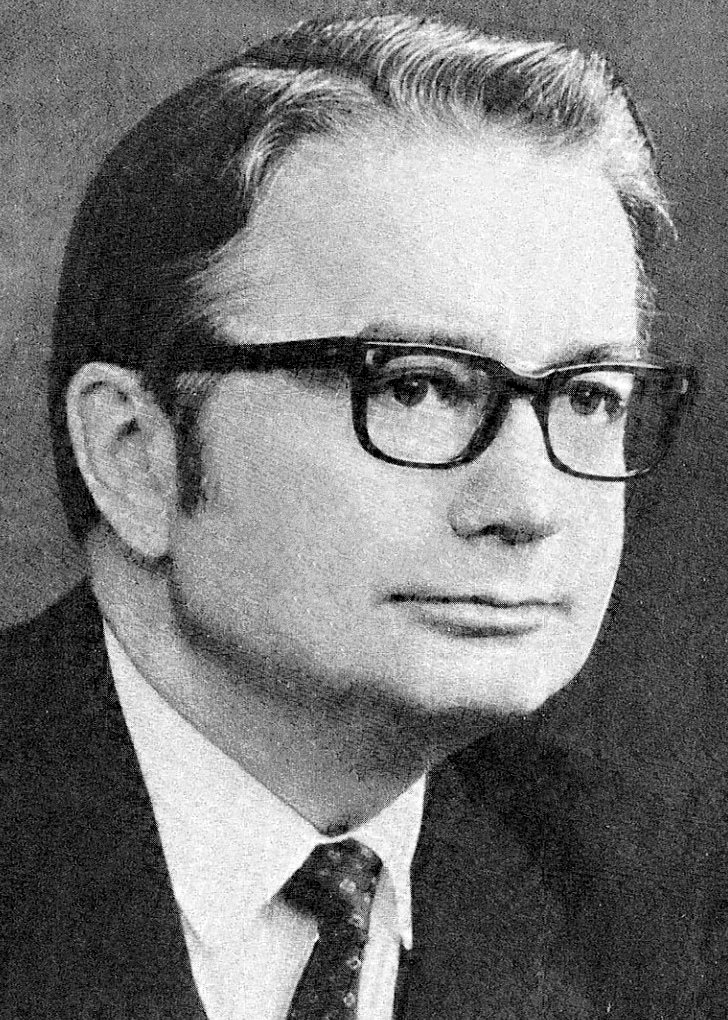

| Nominee | Patrick Lucey | Jack B. Olson |
| Party | Democratic | Republican |
| Popular vote | 841,970 | 801,141 |
| Percentage | 51.24% | 48.76% |
Lieutenant Governor before election
Jack B. Olson
Republican
Elected Lieutenant Governor
Patrick Lucey
Democratic

The 1964 Wisconsin lieutenant gubernatorial election was held on November 3, 1964, in order to elect the lieutenant governor of Wisconsin. Democratic nominee and former Chair of the Wisconsin Democratic Party Patrick Lucey defeated incumbent Republican lieutenant governor Jack B. Olson.

== Republican primary ==
The Republican primary election was held on September 8, 1964. Incumbent lieutenant governor Jack B. Olson received a majority of the votes (86.04%), and was thus elected as the nominee for the general election.

=== Results ===
1964 Republican lieutenant gubernatorial primary
| Party | Candidate | Votes | % |
|---|---|---|---|
| Republican | Jack B. Olson (incumbent) | 279,691 | 86.04% |
| Republican | Willis W. Capps | 45,386 | 13.96% |
| Total votes | | 325,077 | 100.00% |

== General election ==
On election day, November 3, 1964, Democratic nominee Patrick Lucey won the election by a margin of 40,829 votes against his opponent incumbent Republican lieutenant governor Jack B. Olson, thereby gaining Democratic control over the office of lieutenant governor. Lucey was sworn in as the 36th lieutenant governor of Wisconsin on January 4, 1965.

=== Results ===
Wisconsin lieutenant gubernatorial election, 1964
| Party | Candidate | Votes | % |
|---|---|---|---|
| Democratic | Patrick Lucey | 841,970 | 51.24 |
| Republican | Jack B. Olson (incumbent) | 801,141 | 48.76 |
| Total votes | | 1,643,111 | 100.00 |
| Democratic gain from Republican | | | |
