= William Dyke =

American politician and judge (1930–2016)

Bill Dyke
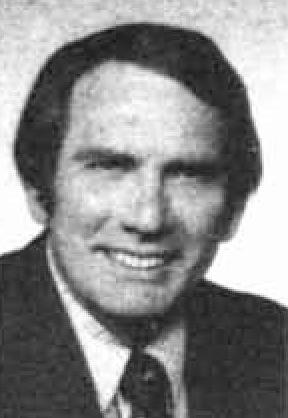

Chief Judge of the 7th District of Wisconsin Circuit Courts
- In office August 1, 2007 – July 31, 2013
- Preceded by: Michael J. Rosborough
- Succeeded by: James J. Duvall

Wisconsin Circuit Court Judge for the Iowa Circuit
- In office January 1, 1997 – January 2016
- Appointed by: Tommy Thompson
- Preceded by: James P. Fiedler
- Succeeded by: Margaret M. Koehler

49th Mayor of Madison, Wisconsin
- In office April 1969 – April 17, 1973
- Preceded by: Otto Festge
- Succeeded by: Paul Soglin

Personal details
- Born: April 25, 1930 Princeton, Illinois, U.S.
- Died: March 10, 2016 (aged 85) Dodgeville, Wisconsin, U.S.
- Cause of death: Pancreatic cancer
- Party: Republican
- Other political affiliations: American Independent (1976)
- Spouse: Christine
- Children: 4
- Education: DePauw University; University of Wisconsin Law School

William D. Dyke (April 25, 1930 – March 10, 2016) was an American lawyer, judge, and politician. He was the 49th mayor of Madison, Wisconsin, from 1969 to 1973, and ran for Vice President of the United States on the American Independent Party ticket with presidential candidate Lester Maddox in the 1976 presidential election. He was also the Republican nominee for Governor of Wisconsin in the 1974 gubernatorial election. From 1996 until two months before his death, in 2016, he served as a Wisconsin circuit court judge in Iowa County, Wisconsin; he was chief judge of the 7th Judicial Administrative District from 2007 to 2013.

== Early life ==
Dyke received his bachelor's degree from DePauw University in Indiana. While completing his degree at the University of Wisconsin Law School, he hosted Circus 3, a local children's television program on WISC-TV. He also moderated Face the State, a local political news program modeled after the nationally televised Face the Nation. The program included interviews with Richard Nixon, Hubert Humphrey, Gerald Ford, John F. Kennedy and other prominent politicians.

== Political career ==
Dyke was a two-term mayor of Madison, Wisconsin from 1969 to 1973. His tenure as mayor is considered a colorful and often controversial part of Madison's history. Dyke presided over Madison during the most turbulent era in the city's history, highlighted by the Sterling Hall bombing and subsequent clashes with student uprisings. One of those student activists, Paul Soglin, defeated Dyke's attempt for re-election in 1973. Undeterred, Dyke ran as the Republican nominee for governor in 1974, losing to Democrat Patrick Lucey.

A conservative Republican, Dyke briefly left the party in 1976 to join Lester Maddox's American Independent Party presidential ticket as the vice presidential nominee; however, he disavowed Maddox's segregationist views. Maddox and Dyke won 170,274 votes in the general election (or 0.21% of votes).

== Post-political career ==
Following the end of his political career, Dyke opened a general contracting business in Mount Horeb, Wisconsin, and bred horses. He also worked as a family mediation lawyer in Mineral Point, Wisconsin.

On December 3, 1996, Governor Tommy Thompson appointed Dyke to the circuit court vacancy in Iowa County, created by the impending retirement of Judge James P. Fiedler. He was elected to a full term on the court in 1998 and subsequently re-elected in 2004 and 2010. He later was selected as the chief judge of the 7th Judicial Administrative District by the Wisconsin Supreme Court, and served the maximum of three two-year terms in that role. Dyke left the bench in January 2016, and died of pancreatic cancer in a Dodgeville, Wisconsin, nursing home two months later.

Dyke illustrated the children's book The General's Hat, or Why the Bell Tower Stopped Working, a tale written by Kay Price about two mice who get on the same ship with General Ulysses S. Grant on his travels to Galena, Illinois.

== Electoral history ==
=== Madison Mayor (1969, 1971, 1973) ===
1973 Madison mayoral election
Party	Candidate	Votes	%	±%
Primary Election, March 6, 1973
Nonpartisan	William Dyke (incumbent)	16,243	36.16%	
Nonpartisan	Paul Soglin	11,485	25.56%	
Nonpartisan	David Stewart	10,350	23.04%	
Nonpartisan	Leo Cooper	6,150	13.69%	
Nonpartisan	R. Whelan Burke	283	0.63%	
Nonpartisan	David Robb	161	0.36%	
Nonpartisan	Joseph Kraemer	122	0.27%	
Nonpartisan	Mark Gregersen	27	0.06%	
	Scattering	105	0.23%	
Total votes		44,926	100.0%	
General Election, April 3, 1973
Nonpartisan	Paul Soglin	37,548	52.35%	
Nonpartisan	William Dyke (incumbent)	34,179	47.65%	
Plurality		3,369	4.70%	
Total votes		71,727	100.0%	

=== Wisconsin Governor (1974) ===
Wisconsin Gubernatorial Election, 1974
Party	Candidate	Votes	%	±%
General Election, November 3, 1974
Democratic	Patrick Lucey (incumbent) Martin J. Schreiber (incumbent)	628,639	53.19%	−1.04%
Republican	William Dyke John M. Alberts	497,189	42.07%	−2.80%
American Independent	William H. Upham Donald D. Hoeft	33,528	2.84%	+2.16%
Independent	Crazy Jim Gary G. Wetzel	12,107	1.02%	
Socialist	William O. Hart Fred Dahir	5,113	0.43%	
Communist	Fred Basset Blair Mary K. Blair	3,617	0.31%	
Socialist Labor	Georgia Cozzini David Hornung	1,492	0.13%	+0.03%
	Scattering	199	0.02%	
Plurality		131,450	11.12%	+1.76%
Total votes		1,181,884	100.0%	-12.01%
Democratic hold				

Party political offices
Preceded by Jack B. Olson	Republican nominee for Governor of Wisconsin; 1974	Succeeded by Lee S. Dreyfus
Preceded by Thomas Anderson	American Independent nominee for Vice President of the United States; 1976	Succeeded by Eileen Shearer
Political offices
Preceded by Otto Festge	Mayor of Madison, Wisconsin; 1969 – 1973	Succeeded by Paul Soglin
Legal offices
Preceded by James P. Fiedler	Wisconsin Circuit Court Judge for the Iowa Circuit; 1996 – 2016	Succeeded by Margaret M. Koehler
Preceded by Michael J. Rosborough	Chief Judge of the 7th District of Wisconsin Circuit Courts; 2007 – 2013	Succeeded by James J. Duvall
