= John M. Alberts =

American politician (1933–2015)

John Michael Alberts (April 24, 1933 – April 26, 2015) was an American politician who served as a member of the Wisconsin State Assembly.

== Life and career ==
Alberts was born in Oconomowoc, Wisconsin on April 24, 1933. He graduated from Oconomowoc High School and Carroll University. Alberts in married with four children and has been a member of Kiwanis.

Alberts was first a member of the Assembly from 1969 to 1973. In 1981, he was re-elected to the Assembly in a special election to fill the vacancy caused by the resignation of Harry G. Snyder. Alberts was also a candidate for Lieutenant Governor of Wisconsin in 1974, running on the gubernatorial ticket with William Dyke. They would lose to incumbents Patrick Lucey and Martin J. Schreiber. Alberts was a Republican.

Alberts died from leukemia on April 26, 2015, at the age of 82.

Party political offices
Preceded by David Martin	Republican nominee for Lieutenant Governor of Wisconsin; 1974	Succeeded by Russell Olson
