= Philleo Nash =

American politician (1909–1987)

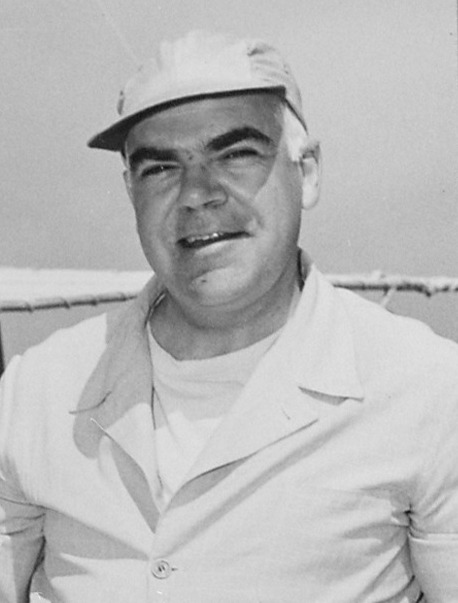
- Nash in 1951

Commissioner of Indian Affairs
- In office September 20, 1961 – March 11, 1966
- President: John F. Kennedy; Lyndon B. Johnson
- Preceded by: Glenn L. Emmons
- Succeeded by: Robert L. Bennett

33rd Lieutenant Governor of Wisconsin
- In office January 5, 1959 – January 2, 1961
- Governor: Gaylord Nelson
- Preceded by: Warren P. Knowles
- Succeeded by: Warren P. Knowles

Chair of the Democratic Party of Wisconsin
- In office October 8, 1955 – October 12, 1957
- Preceded by: Elliot Walstead
- Succeeded by: Patrick Lucey

Personal details
- Born: October 25, 1909 Wisconsin Rapids, Wisconsin, U.S.
- Died: October 12, 1987 (aged 77) Marshfield, Wisconsin, U.S.
- Resting place: Forest Hill Cemetery, Wisconsin Rapids, Wisconsin
- Party: Democratic
- Spouse: Edith Rosenfels (m. 1935–1987)
- Children: 2
- Education: University of Wisconsin; University of Chicago (Ph.D.)
- Profession: politician

Philleo Nash (October 25, 1909 – October 12, 1987) was an American government official, anthropologist, and politician. A member of the Democratic Party, he was Commissioner of the U.S. Bureau of Indian Affairs (1961–1966) during the presidencies of John F. Kennedy and Lyndon B. Johnson. Previously, he was the 33rd Lieutenant Governor of Wisconsin (1959–1961) and was chairman of the Democratic Party of Wisconsin (1955–1957).

Earlier in his career, he served more than 10 years as a political appointee in the Franklin D. Roosevelt and Harry S. Truman administrations, including as Special Assistant directly to President Harry S. Truman (1946–1952), influencing his policy on desegregation of the armed forces and federal government, as well as policy related to Native Americans and other minorities.

Nash was elected Lieutenant Governor in 1958, defeating Jerome D. Grant and Albert Di Piazza in the Democratic Primary. In the general election, Nash defeated incumbent Warren Perley Knowles. He sought a second term in 1960. He once again defeated Grant in the Democratic Primary but narrowly lost reelection to Knowles in a rematch of the previous election.

His wife, Edith Nash, was a poet and activist for human rights and civil rights.

== Early life and family ==
Philleo Nash was born in Wisconsin Rapids, Wisconsin. He grew up in the Congregational Church. He graduated from the University of Wisconsin in 1932, and went on to graduate studies. In 1935, he received his Ph.D. in anthropology from the University of Chicago.

On November 2, 1935, he married Edith Rosenfels of Oak Park, Illinois, whom he had met in graduate school in Chicago. She also trained in anthropology and did field studies in the American West in the 1930s. They had two daughters.

From 1937–1941, Nash was a Lecturer at the University of Toronto and from 1941–1942, at the University of Wisconsin. In this latter period, he also began to serve as a manager in his family's Biron Cranberry Company.

After they moved to Washington, D.C., where he served in the government, Edith Nash became the second director of the Georgetown Day School, the first racially integrated school in the capital. She was also an accomplished poet. Among other poetry books, she published Practice: The Here and Now (2001) by Cross+Roads Press. She founded the Riverwood Roundtable, a central Wisconsin literary society.

== Career ==
Philleo Nash gained political appointments to serve in the administrations of Franklin D. Roosevelt and Harry S. Truman (1946–1953). From 1942–1946, he served as Special Assistant to the Director, White House Liaison, Office of War Information. During that wartime period, he worked on the issue of conscientious objectors during the war, writing reports entitled Suggestions Concerning the Treatment of Conscientious Objectors and the Report of the President's Amnesty Board.

During the Truman administration, Nash served directly for the president as his Special Assistant from 1946–1952, and as his Administrative Assistant 1952–1953. Nash worked on Truman's initiatives related to civil rights, including advising him of how to proceed with integration of the United States Armed Forces during a several-year period.

As part of civil rights initiatives begun in 1946, in February 1948 Truman submitted a comprehensive civil rights bill to Congress; later that year, he issued Executive Order 9981 to integrate the military. The same day, he issued Executive Order 9980 to end racial discrimination in hiring in the federal government and initiate desegregation in the workplace (which President Woodrow Wilson had segregated in 1914).

From 1961–1966, Nash returned to Washington, D.C., from Wisconsin, where he was appointed as Commissioner of the United States Bureau of Indian Affairs during the administrations of John F. Kennedy, and Lyndon B. Johnson. American Indians were increasingly active in demanding recognition of sovereignty and working for their civil rights.

=== Return to private life ===
In 1946 Nash became President of Biron Cranberry company, which he continued until 1977. After 1953 he retired the first time from public service and returned to Wisconsin, devoting his time to the family business. Philleo and Edith Nash had a cottage in Biron, where the company was located. They lived most of the time on Riverwood Lane in Wisconsin Rapids.

He returned to Washington, D.C., from 1961–1966, heading the Bureau of Indian Affairs, during a period when Native Americans were pressing for social justice. In 1963, he appeared on To Tell the Truth, as himself, and spoke about the goals of the Bureau for improving the lives of Native Americans.

Philleo Nash died in Marshfield, Wisconsin.

== See also ==
- Bronislaw Malinowski Award
- Isaac Woodard

== Notes ==
Party political offices
Preceded by Elliot Walstead	Chair of the Democratic Party of Wisconsin; 1955–1957	Succeeded by Patrick Lucey
Preceded by William A. Schmidt	Democratic nominee for Lieutenant Governor of Wisconsin; 1958, 1960	Succeeded by David Carley
Political offices
Preceded by Warren P. Knowles	Lieutenant Governor of Wisconsin; 1959–1961	Succeeded by Warren P. Knowles
Government offices
Preceded by Glenn L. Ammons	Commissioner of the United States Bureau of Indian Affairs; 1961–1966	Succeeded by Robert L. Bennett
