= 1966 Wisconsin gubernatorial election =

- November 8, 1966
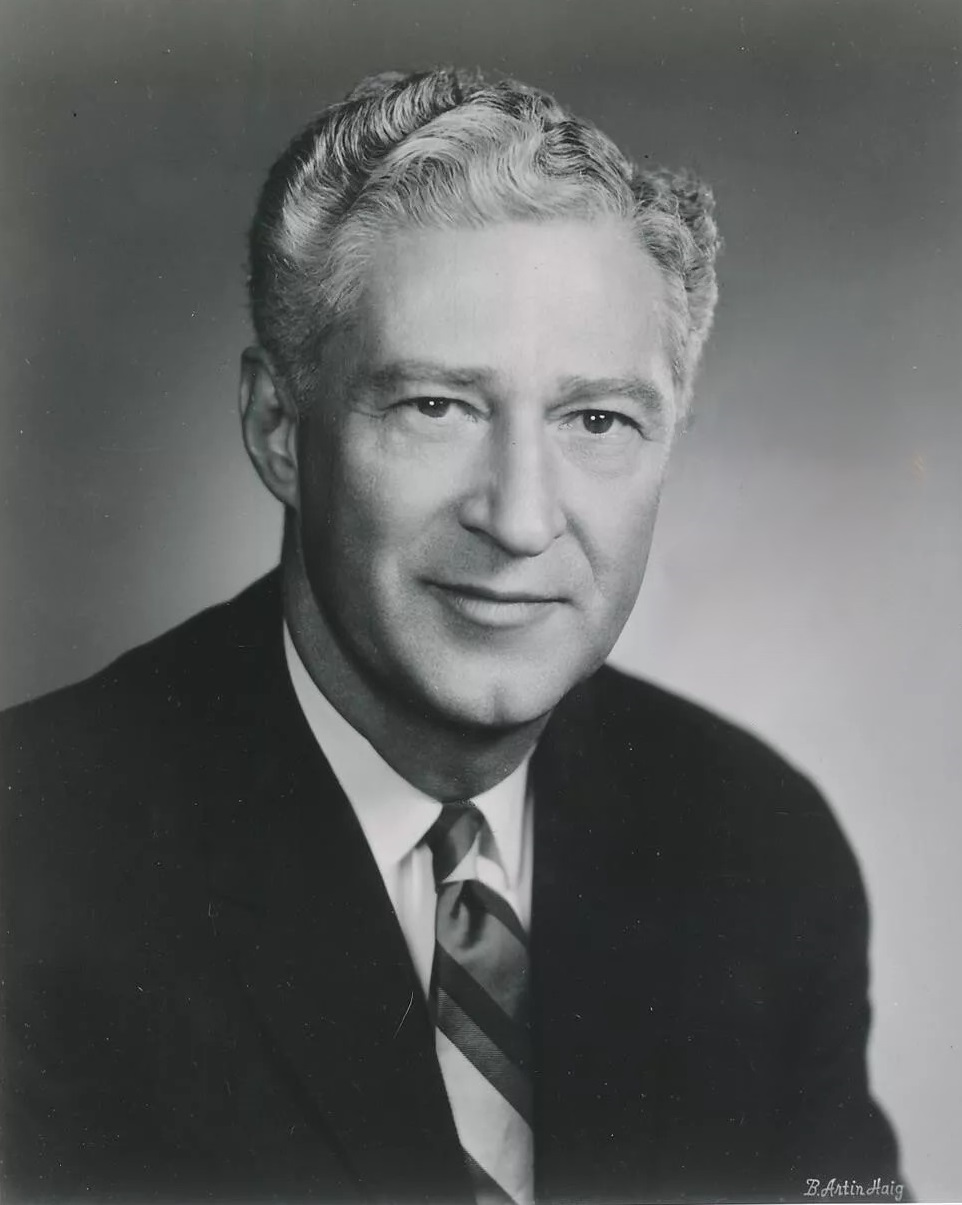

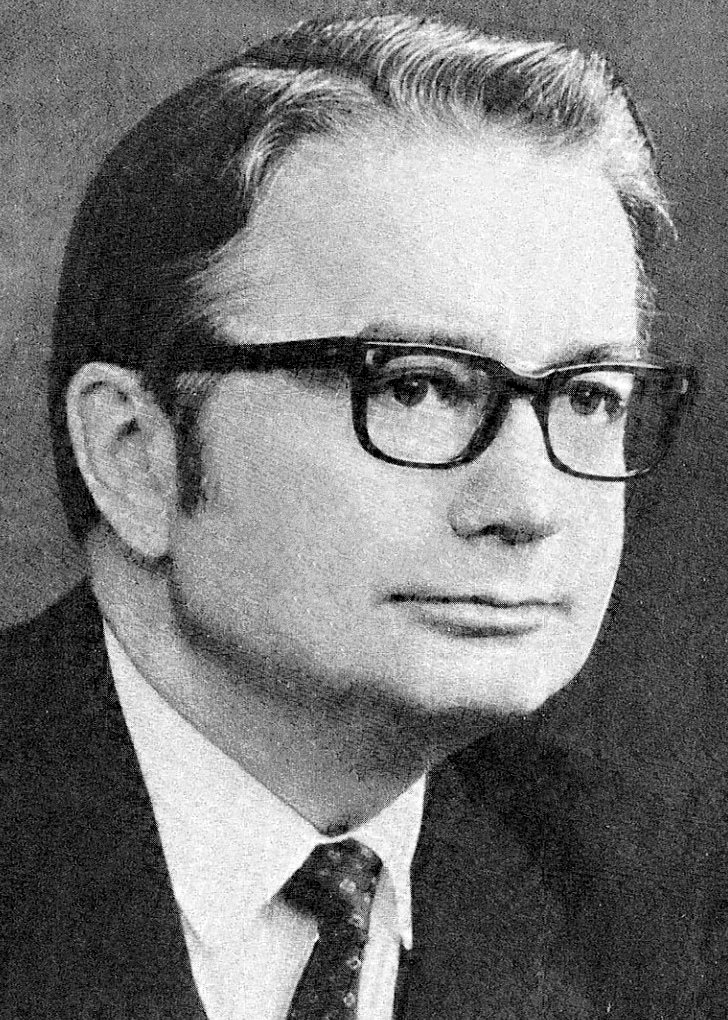
Nominee	Warren P. Knowles	Patrick Lucey
Party	Republican	Democratic
Popular vote	626,047	539,258
Percentage	53.50%	46.08%
- County results Knowles: 40–50% 50–60% 60–70% 70–80% Lucey: 50–60% 60–70%
Governor before election
Warren P. Knowles
Republican
Elected Governor
Warren P. Knowles
Republican

The 1966 Wisconsin gubernatorial election was held on November 8, 1966. Republican Warren P. Knowles won the election with 53.50% of the vote, winning his second term as Governor of Wisconsin and defeating Democratic incumbent lieutenant governor and future governor Patrick J. Lucey.

== Primary election ==
The primary election was held on September 13, 1966.

=== Republican party ===
==== Candidates ====
- Warren P. Knowles, incumbent governor

==== Results ====
Republican primary results
Party	Candidate	Votes	%
Republican	Warren P. Knowles (incumbent)	217,199	100.00%
Total votes		217,199	100.00%

=== Democratic party ===
==== Candidates ====
- David Carley, nominee for Lieutenant Governor of Wisconsin in 1962
- Dominic H. Frinzi, candidate for Democratic nomination in 1964
- Patrick J. Lucey, Lieutenant Governor of Wisconsin
- Abe L. Swed

==== Results ====
Democratic primary results
Party	Candidate	Votes	%
Democratic	Patrick J. Lucey	128,359	45.22%
Democratic	David Carley	95,803	33.75%
Democratic	Dominic H. Frinzi	44,344	15.62%
Democratic	Abe L. Swed	15,362	5.41%
Total votes		283,868	100.00%

== General election ==
newspaper advertisement for Lucey's campaign

=== Candidates ===
- Warren P. Knowles, Republican
- Patrick J. Lucey, Democrat
- Adolf Wiggert, Independent

=== Results ===
1966 Wisconsin gubernatorial election
Party	Candidate	Votes	%	±%
Republican	Warren P. Knowles (incumbent)	626,041	53.50%	+2.95%
Democratic	Patrick J. Lucey	539,258	46.08%	−3.35%
Independent	Adolf Wiggert	4,745	0.41%	
	Scattering (Note: These are not listed in the Blue Book but are listed in the Board of Canvassers report.)	129	0.01%	
Majority		86,783	7.42%	
Total votes		1,170,173	100.00%	
Republican hold		Swing	+6.30%	

=== Results by county ===
This was the only time between 1952 and 1990 that Bayfield County voted for the Republican candidate.

County	Warren P. Knowles Republican		Patrick J. Lucey Democratic		Adolf Wiggert Independent		Scattering Write-in		Margin		Total votes cast
County	#	%	#	%	#	%	#	%	#	%	Total votes cast
Adams	1,234	48.49%	1,291	50.73%	20	0.79%	0	0.00%	-57	-2.24%	2,545
Ashland	2,490	44.16%	3,135	55.60%	13	0.23%	0	0.00%	-645	-11.44%	5,638
Barron	5,659	65.11%	3,007	34.60%	24	0.28%	1	0.01%	2,652	30.51%	8,691
Bayfield	2,275	51.66%	2,104	47.77%	23	0.52%	2	0.05%	171	3.88%	4,404
Brown	20,071	51.93%	18,341	47.45%	238	0.62%	2	0.01%	1,730	4.48%	38,652
Buffalo	1,770	58.28%	1,264	41.62%	3	0.10%	0	0.00%	506	16.66%	3,037
Burnett	1,912	61.94%	1,169	37.87%	0	0.00%	6	0.19%	743	24.07%	3,087
Calumet	4,272	56.37%	3,274	43.20%	33	0.44%	0	0.00%	998	13.17%	7,579
Chippewa	5,558	50.73%	5,358	48.90%	41	0.37%	0	0.00%	200	1.83%	10,957
Clark	4,908	58.84%	3,403	40.80%	30	0.36%	0	0.00%	1,505	18.04%	8,341
Columbia	7,017	62.56%	4,139	36.90%	58	0.52%	2	0.02%	2,878	25.66%	11,216
Crawford	2,795	52.03%	2,566	47.77%	9	0.17%	2	0.04%	229	4.26%	5,372
Dane	43,249	59.66%	28,214	38.92%	989	1.36%	46	0.06%	15,035	20.74%	72,498
Dodge	10,109	60.44%	6,569	39.27%	48	0.29%	0	0.00%	3,540	21.16%	16,726
Door	4,351	61.84%	2,670	37.95%	15	0.21%	0	0.00%	1,681	23.89%	7,036
Douglas	6,520	43.93%	8,305	55.96%	16	0.11%	0	0.00%	-1,785	-12.03%	14,841
Dunn	4,106	58.91%	2,840	40.75%	22	0.32%	2	0.03%	1,266	18.16%	6,970
Eau Claire	9,375	53.31%	8,166	46.43%	46	0.26%	0	0.00%	1,209	6.87%	17,587
Florence	520	52.90%	462	47.00%	1	0.10%	0	0.00%	58	5.90%	983
Fond du Lac	13,466	55.94%	10,538	43.78%	68	0.28%	0	0.00%	2,928	12.16%	24,072
Forest	1,123	42.75%	1,492	56.79%	12	0.46%	0	0.00%	-369	-14.05%	2,627
Grant	6,892	68.58%	3,132	31.17%	25	0.25%	0	0.00%	3,760	37.42%	10,049
Green	4,807	74.07%	1,654	25.49%	29	0.45%	0	0.00%	3,153	48.58%	6,490
Green Lake	3,305	63.14%	1,920	36.68%	9	0.17%	0	0.00%	1,385	26.46%	5,234
Iowa	3,519	66.58%	1,740	32.92%	26	0.49%	0	0.00%	1,779	33.66%	5,285
Iron	1,218	47.86%	1,321	51.91%	5	0.20%	1	0.04%	-103	-4.05%	2,545
Jackson	2,458	53.50%	2,124	46.23%	11	0.24%	1	0.02%	334	7.27%	4,594
Jefferson	8,969	60.82%	5,720	38.79%	53	0.36%	4	0.03%	3,249	22.03%	14,746
Juneau	3,459	60.20%	2,264	39.40%	22	0.38%	1	0.02%	1,195	20.80%	5,746
Kenosha	14,282	43.79%	18,273	56.02%	59	0.18%	2	0.01%	-3,991	-12.24%	32,616
Kewaunee	3,029	53.51%	2,619	46.26%	13	0.23%	0	0.00%	410	7.24%	5,661
La Crosse	12,172	52.56%	10,854	46.87%	126	0.54%	8	0.03%	1,318	5.69%	23,160
Lafayette	3,366	64.15%	1,875	35.73%	6	0.11%	0	0.00%	1,491	28.42%	5,247
Langlade	3,217	53.34%	2,800	46.43%	14	0.23%	0	0.00%	417	6.91%	6,031
Lincoln	3,896	54.82%	3,194	44.94%	17	0.24%	0	0.00%	702	9.88%	7,107
Manitowoc	11,096	44.86%	13,514	54.63%	124	0.50%	2	0.01%	-2,418	-9.78%	24,736
Marathon	14,738	51.02%	14,031	48.57%	119	0.41%	0	0.00%	707	2.45%	28,888
Marinette	5,376	47.16%	6,005	52.68%	16	0.14%	2	0.02%	-629	-5.52%	11,399
Marquette	1,824	66.06%	929	33.65%	7	0.25%	1	0.04%	895	32.42%	2,761
Menominee	176	32.59%	361	66.85%	3	0.56%	0	0.00%	-185	-34.26%	540
Milwaukee	120,244	45.81%	141,308	53.83%	937	0.36%	12	0.00%	-21,064	-8.02%	262,501
Monroe	4,887	60.51%	3,157	39.09%	32	0.40%	0	0.00%	1,730	21.42%	8,076
Oconto	4,007	52.00%	3,687	47.85%	10	0.13%	2	0.03%	320	4.15%	7,706
Oneida	3,880	50.03%	3,854	49.69%	20	0.26%	2	0.03%	26	0.34%	7,756
Outagamie	16,242	52.61%	14,451	46.81%	177	0.57%	0	0.00%	1,791	5.80%	30,870
Ozaukee	8,404	62.02%	5,125	37.82%	20	0.15%	1	0.01%	3,279	24.20%	13,550
Pepin	1,095	53.60%	944	46.21%	4	0.20%	0	0.00%	151	7.39%	2,043
Pierce	3,901	61.56%	2,431	38.36%	4	0.06%	1	0.02%	1,470	23.20%	6,337
Polk	4,963	65.16%	2,640	34.66%	14	0.18%	0	0.00%	2,323	30.50%	7,617
Portage	5,183	43.75%	6,586	55.60%	76	0.64%	1	0.01%	-1,403	-11.84%	11,846
Price	2,604	53.71%	2,221	45.81%	21	0.43%	2	0.04%	383	7.90%	4,848
Racine	23,104	51.20%	21,894	48.52%	122	0.27%	1	0.00%	1,210	2.68%	45,121
Richland	2,991	64.99%	1,591	34.57%	18	0.39%	2	0.04%	1,400	30.42%	4,602
Rock	20,419	60.16%	13,418	39.53%	102	0.30%	4	0.01%	7,001	20.63%	33,943
Rusk	2,255	48.14%	2,415	51.56%	13	0.28%	1	0.02%	-160	-3.42%	4,684
Sauk	6,850	63.19%	3,928	36.23%	63	0.58%	0	0.00%	2,922	26.95%	10,841
Sawyer	2,493	65.16%	1,313	34.32%	19	0.50%	1	0.03%	1,180	30.84%	3,826
Shawano	5,745	62.90%	3,380	37.01%	8	0.09%	0	0.00%	2,365	25.90%	9,133
Sheboygan	15,925	49.87%	15,882	49.74%	123	0.39%	1	0.00%	43	0.13%	31,931
St. Croix	5,569	61.00%	3,546	38.84%	14	0.15%	0	0.00%	2,023	22.16%	9,129
Taylor	2,323	47.35%	2,562	52.22%	21	0.43%	0	0.00%	-239	-4.87%	4,906
Trempealeau	3,024	51.16%	2,878	48.69%	9	0.15%	0	0.00%	146	2.47%	5,911
Vernon	4,187	57.21%	3,092	42.25%	38	0.52%	2	0.03%	1,095	14.96%	7,319
Vilas	2,713	59.56%	1,831	40.20%	10	0.22%	1	0.02%	882	19.36%	4,555
Walworth	11,169	67.13%	5,447	32.74%	22	0.13%	1	0.01%	5,722	34.39%	16,639
Washburn	2,353	57.77%	1,707	41.91%	12	0.29%	1	0.02%	646	15.86%	4,073
Washington	8,390	57.86%	6,098	42.05%	13	0.09%	0	0.00%	2,292	15.81%	14,501
Waukesha	33,157	60.07%	21,868	39.62%	170	0.31%	2	0.00%	11,289	20.45%	55,197
Waupaca	7,175	68.44%	3,285	31.34%	23	0.22%	0	0.00%	3,890	37.11%	10,483
Waushara	2,503	67.10%	1,216	32.60%	11	0.29%	0	0.00%	1,287	34.50%	3,730
Winnebago	18,891	54.98%	15,300	44.53%	166	0.48%	5	0.01%	3,591	10.45%	34,362
Wood	8,816	53.62%	7,566	46.01%	60	0.36%	1	0.01%	1,250	7.60%	16,443
Total	626,041	53.50%	539,258	46.08%	4,745	0.41%	129	0.01%	86,783	7.42%	1,170,173

==== Counties that flipped from Democratic to Republican ====
- Bayfield
- Burnett
- Dane
- Eau Claire
- Florence
- Polk
- Racine
- Sheboygan

==== Counties that flipped from Republican to Democratic ====
- Adams
- Marinette
