= Edith Nash =

American educator and poet (1913–2003)

- Born: July 12, 1913; Oak Park, Illinois, US
- Died: November 9, 2003 (aged 90); Wisconsin Rapids, Wisconsin, US

Edith Nash (July 12, 1913 – November 9, 2003) was an American educator and poet. She served as the second director of the Georgetown Day School in Washington, D.C., from 1961-1975. She and her husband Philleo Nash, who served as a political appointee in several Democratic presidential administrations, lived most of their lives in Wisconsin. She published several collections of poetry, and her work has been included in anthologies.

== Early life ==
Edith Henriet Rosenfels was born in 1913 as the youngest child and only girl in a Jewish family in Oak Park, Illinois. She had three older brothers: Richard, and identical twins Paul and Walter. Edith later described their mother Helen (d. 1965) as politically liberal; for years she was on the Abraham Lincoln Center Board on the South Side of Chicago. Their father Irwin S. Rosenfels, a businessman, died in 1935. In terms of family dynamics, Edith believed she was the favorite of their father; she said he found the boys difficult to deal with, and Richard was preferred by their mother. Richard earned a PhD in botany; Paul became a psychiatrist and psychoanalyst, and Walter worked in advertising as a copy writer. As they grew up, the three brothers realized they were homosexual, but never discussed it openly with their parents.

Edith Rosenfels met her future husband Philleo Nash while in college at the University of Chicago. He roomed for a time with her older brother Paul and was getting his PhD in anthropology. On November 2, 1935, they married. Edith Nash, also trained as an anthropologist, did field work in the American West in the 1930s among Native Americans. Their children were daughters Maggie and Sally.

Paul Rosenfels became a board-certified psychiatrist and psychoanalyst in Chicago, but taught as well as having a clinical practice. He left academia in the 1940s, serving in the military and then in the California prison system. He published a book against psychoanalysis. He was the only brother to marry and have a child, but left his family when he moved to California. After living there as a homosexual, he moved to New York City in 1962. He started a private practice and in 1971 published a book about homosexuality, saying it was as valid as heterosexuality. In 1973 he and Dean Hannottee with students co-founded the Ninth Street Center in New York City for the study of humanity. It included peer counseling and group discussions.

== Education career ==
After moving to Washington, D.C. in 1942, Nash became the second director and co-founder of the Georgetown Day School, the first racially integrated school in the capital. She served there from 1961 to 1975.

After they left Washington, the Nashes settled in Wisconsin Rapids, Wisconsin. She returned to Washington in the early 1960s After her husband's death in 1990, Nash managed their family in Biron, Wisconsin, cranberry marsh and processing business mostly from there. They had also often stayed at their cottage in Biron. She became active in local and state politics and was an early supporter of U.S. Senator Russ Feingold.

== Literary career ==
Edith Nash also wrote poetry and critical essays. Practice: The Here and Now (Cross+Roads Press, 2001), her best-known book, includes a sample of her poetry and prose. Included in it are poems about her 1930s "coming out" party at a Chicago speakeasy, meeting "Ernie" Hemingway through his younger sister in 1929 at their parents' house, and progressive causes she had championed.

Her life was celebrated in the poem "When You're Eighty-Five," written by her friend Mark Scarborough and published in the summer 2001 issue of the Wisconsin Academy Review.

Among Nash's other writer friends were Muriel Rukeyser and Frances Hamerstrom. Nash, an inspiration for generations of writers in central Wisconsin, also was a tireless advocate of free expression during her tenure as a member of a book review committee of the Wisconsin Rapids Public Schools. She founded the Riverwood Roundtable, a writing group and literary society.

Elisa Derickson was a student member of the Roundtable. In 1994, after winning a Seventeen magazine award and scholarship, Nash assisted Derickson in setting up the Elisa Derickson Fund for Writing through the newly formed South Wood County Community Foundation, Wisconsin Rapids, Wisconsin. Nash contributed money from the Roundtable and other fund raising to this fund.

Edith Nash's other volumes of poetry include White Line on the Left (Round Robin Press, no date, but circa 1990), The Words (Home Brew Press, 1992), Now is the Time (Round Robin Press, 1996), and A Christmas Offering: Selected Poems, 1985–2000 (privately printed, 2000). Her poetry has been included in the anthologies, The Poetry of Cold (Home Brew Press, 1997), and At the Heart of Riverwood (Round Robin Press, 2000).

Her poems and essays were published in magazines as Free Verse, Wisconsin Poet's Calendar, and Wisconsin River Valley Journal.

Edith Nash died in Wisconsin Rapids, Wisconsin.
