= David Martin (Wisconsin politician) =

American politician (1931–2025)

David O. Martin (March 7, 1931 – January 22, 2025) was an American politician who was a member of the Wisconsin State Assembly.

== Life and career ==
Martin was born in Appleton, Wisconsin on March 7, 1931. After graduating from Neenah High School in Neenah, Wisconsin, Martin attended the University of Wisconsin-Madison and the University of Michigan. He also served in the United States Army Corps of Engineers. A Republican, Martin was first elected to the Assembly in 1960. He became Assistant Majority Leader in 1967. Martin died on January 22, 2025, at the age of 93.

Party political offices
| Preceded by Jack B. Olson | Republican nominee for Lieutenant Governor of Wisconsin; 1970 | Succeeded by John M. Alberts |
