= Jack B. Olson =

American politician (1920–2003)

Jack Olson
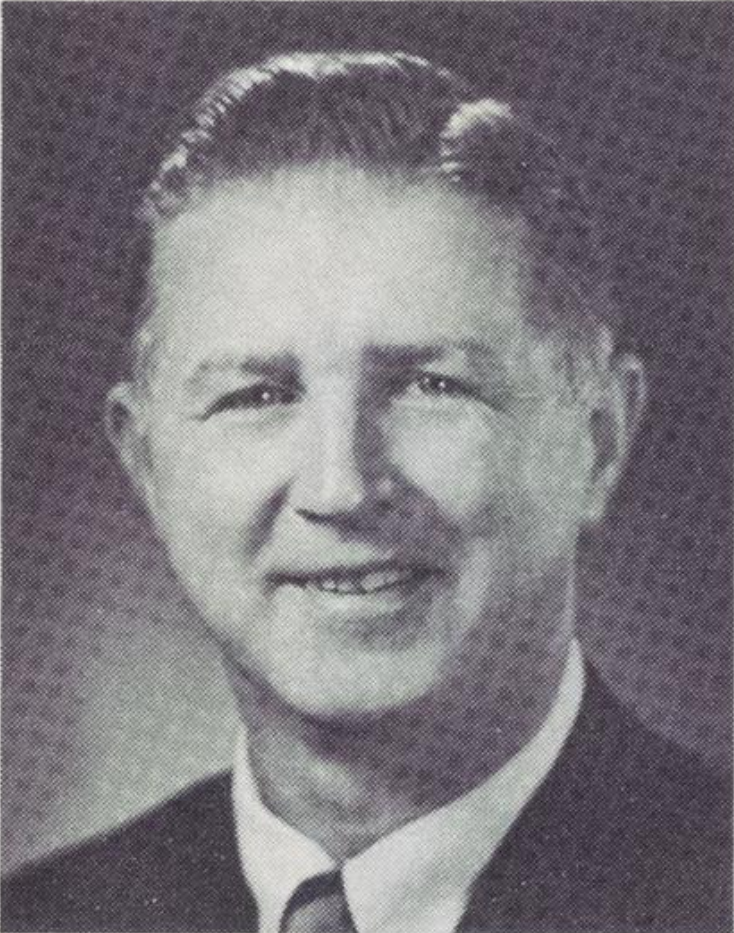

3rd United States Ambassador to the Bahamas
- In office December 22, 1976 – April 30, 1977
- President: Gerald Ford
- Preceded by: Seymour Weiss
- Succeeded by: William Bernstein Schwartz Jr.

35th and 37th Lieutenant Governor of Wisconsin
- In office January 2, 1967 – January 4, 1971
- Governor: Warren P. Knowles
- Preceded by: Patrick Lucey
- Succeeded by: Martin J. Schreiber
- In office January 7, 1963 – January 4, 1965
- Governor: John W. Reynolds Jr.
- Preceded by: Warren P. Knowles
- Succeeded by: Patrick Lucey

Personal details
- Born: August 29, 1920 Wisconsin Dells, Wisconsin, U.S.
- Died: July 3, 2003 (aged 82) Wisconsin Dells, Wisconsin, U.S.
- Party: Republican

Jack Benjamin Olson (August 29, 1920 – July 3, 2003) was an American businessman, diplomat, politician, and Republican from the U.S. state of Wisconsin.

== Early life ==
Olson was born in Kilbourn (now Wisconsin Dells) in Columbia County, Wisconsin on August 29, 1920, to Jane Zimmerman Olson and Grover Olson. He graduated from Wisconsin Dells High School and attended Western Michigan University. Olson married Eleanor Lang of Kalamazoo, Michigan on March 7, 1942; he graduated from Western Michigan University the same year with a Bachelor of Science degree. He joined the U.S. Navy after graduating and became a PT boat commander, serving in the North Atlantic Ocean during World War II. He became a Lieutenant Junior Grade.

Upon returning home, Olson owned and operated Dells Boat Tours and Amphibious Duck rides, serving as president of his family's boat company. He was active in the tourism industry, promoting Wisconsin Dells as a resort town. He was a president of the Wisconsin Vacationland Council.

== Political career ==
Olson, circa 1966

Olson was a Wisconsin delegate to the 1960, 1964, and 1968 National Republican Conventions, and served as state chairman for the presidential campaign of Richard Nixon. During this time he was also the director of the economic development project for the University of Hawaiʻi. Olson served as the 35th and 37th Lieutenant Governor of Wisconsin, from 1963 to 1965 and from 1967 to 1971. He was the director and official representative on the first Trade Mission to Europe and Vice Chairman of Wisconsin's Outdoor Resources Action Program 200 program.

Olson ran unsuccessfully as the Republican nominee for governor of Wisconsin in 1970. Nixon appointed him to the Air Quality Advisory Board; Gerald Ford later appointed him United States Ambassador to the Bahamas (1976–1977) and to the Citizens' Committee on Environmental Quality and the Committee for Economic Co-operation and Development.

Olson won Western Michigan University's Distinguished Alumni Award in 1966.

He died at age 82 on July 3, 2003, at his home in Wisconsin Dells following a long illness.

== See also ==
- 1962 Wisconsin lieutenant gubernatorial election
- 1964 Wisconsin lieutenant gubernatorial election
- 1966 Wisconsin lieutenant gubernatorial election
- 1970 Wisconsin gubernatorial election

Party political offices
Preceded by Warren P. Knowles	Republican nominee for Lieutenant Governor of Wisconsin; 1962, 1964, 1966, 1968	Succeeded by David Martin
Preceded by Warren P. Knowles	Republican nominee for Governor of Wisconsin; 1970	Succeeded by William Dyke
Diplomatic posts
Preceded by Seymour Weiss	United States Ambassador to the Bahamas; December 22, 1976–April 30, 1977	Succeeded by William Bernstein Schwartz Jr.
Political offices
Preceded by Warren Knowles	Lieutenant Governor of Wisconsin; 1963–1965	Succeeded by Patrick Lucey
Preceded by Patrick Lucey	Lieutenant Governor of Wisconsin; 1967–1971	Succeeded by Martin Schreiber
