= 1974 Wisconsin gubernatorial election =

- November 5, 1974
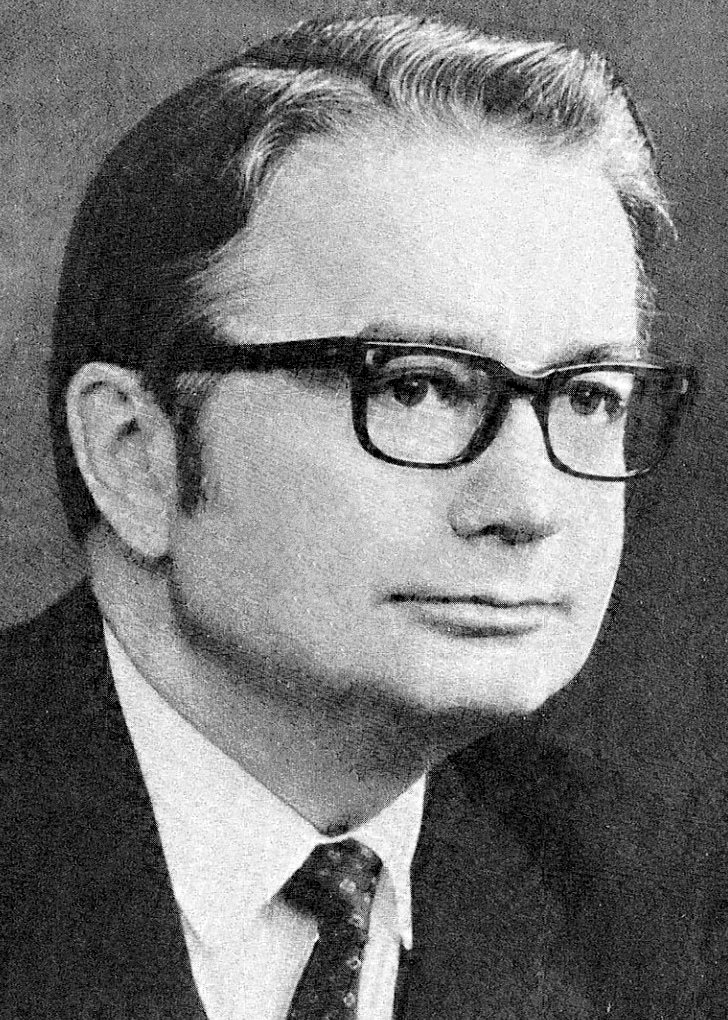

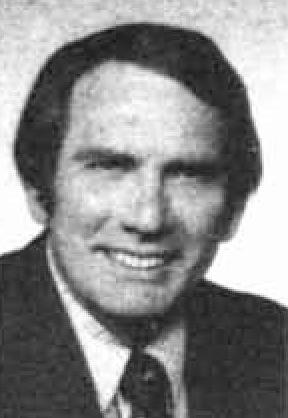
Nominee	Patrick Lucey	William Dyke
Party	Democratic	Republican
Running mate	Martin J. Schreiber	John M. Alberts
Popular vote	628,639	497,195
Percentage	53.19%	42.06%
- County results Lucey: 40–50% 50–60% 60–70% 70–80% 80–90% Dyke: 40–50% 50–60% 60–70%
Governor before election
Patrick J. Lucey
Democratic
Elected Governor
Patrick J. Lucey
Democratic

The 1974 Wisconsin gubernatorial election was held on November 5, 1974. Democrat Patrick Lucey won the election with 53% of the vote, winning his second term as governor of Wisconsin and defeating Republican William Dyke.

As of 2025, this is the last time a Democratic gubernatorial candidate won Waukesha, Ozaukee and Washington counties. These three counties, collectively known as the WOW counties, have been among the most Republican areas in the state since the 1940s. It is also the last time a Democratic gubernatorial candidate carried Calumet and Marinette counties.

== Primary election ==
The primary election was held on September 10, 1974. Nominees for governor and lieutenant governor were selected in separate primaries before running on a joint ticket in the general election.

=== Democratic party ===
==== Governor ====
===== Candidates =====
- Edmond Hou-Seye, American party nominee for United States Senate in 1970
- Patrick J. Lucey, incumbent governor

===== Results =====
Democratic gubernatorial primary results
Party	Candidate	Votes	%
Democratic	Patrick J. Lucey (incumbent)	259,001	78.22%
Democratic	Edmond Hou-Seye	72,113	21.78%
Total votes		331,114	100.00%

==== Lieutenant governor ====
===== Candidates =====
- Martin J. Schreiber, incumbent lieutenant governor
- Andrew Tripoli

===== Results =====
Democratic lieutenant gubernatorial primary results
Party	Candidate	Votes	%
Democratic	Martin J. Schreiber (incumbent)	281,101	86.78%
Democratic	Andrew Tripoli	42,837	13.22%
Total votes		323,938	100.00%

=== Republican party ===
==== Governor ====
===== Candidates =====
- William Dyke, former mayor of Madison

===== Results =====
Republican gubernatorial primary results
Party	Candidate	Votes	%
Republican	William Dyke	161,823	100.00%
Total votes		161,823	100.00%

==== Lieutenant governor ====
===== Candidates =====
- John M. Alberts, member of Wisconsin State Assembly

===== Results =====
Republican lieutenant gubernatorial primary results
Party	Candidate	Votes	%
Republican	John M. Alberts	150,984	100.00%
Total votes		150,984	100.00%

=== American party ===
==== Governor ====
===== Candidates =====
- William H. Upham

===== Results =====
American gubernatorial primary results
Party	Candidate	Votes	%
American	William H. Upham	5,800	100.00%
Total votes		5,800	100.00%

==== Lieutenant Governor ====
===== Candidates =====
- Donald D. Hoeft

===== Results =====
American lieutenant gubernatorial primary results
Party	Candidate	Votes	%
American	Donald D. Hoeft	5,561	100.00%
Total votes		5,561	100.00%

== General election ==
=== Candidates ===
- Fred B. Blair & Mary K. Blair, Independent
- Georgia Cozzini & David Hornung, Independent
- William Dyke & John M. Alberts, Republican
- William O. Hart & Fred Dahir, Independent
- Crazy Jim & Gary C. Wetzel, Independent
- Patrick J. Lucey & Martin J. Schreiber, Democrat
- William H. Upham & Donald D. Hoeft, American

=== Results ===
1974 Wisconsin gubernatorial election (Note: There is a discrepancy between the certified totals and the county figures for Dyke, Jim, Hart, and Cozzini. It appears as though the originally certified totals were incorrect; the county by county portion of the report has the original totals whited out and reprinted with the sum of the county figures for these candidates.)
Party	Candidate	Votes	%	±%
Democratic	Patrick J. Lucey (incumbent)	628,639	53.19%	−1.05%
Republican	William Dyke	497,195 (Note: The originally certified total was 497,189.)	42.06%	−2.80%
American	William H. Upham	33,528	2.84%	+2.16%
Independent	Crazy Jim	12,203 (Note: The originally certified total was 12,107.)	1.03%	
Independent	William O. Hart	5,159 (Note: The originally certified total was 5,113.)	0.44%	
Independent	Fred B. Blair	3,617	0.31%	
Independent	Georgia Cozzini	1,513 (Note: The originally certified total was 1,492.)	0.13%	
	Scattering (Note: These are not listed in the Blue Book but are listed in the Board of Canvassers report.)	132	0.01%	
Majority		131,444	11.12%	
Total votes		1,181,976	100.00%	
Democratic hold		Swing	+1.76%	

=== Results by county ===
Lucey was the first Democrat since Albert G. Schmedeman in 1934 to win Outagamie County, Ozaukee County, Sawyer County, and Waukesha County. Adams County, Jackson County, and Oneida County would not vote for the losing candidate again until 2018.

County	Patrick J. Lucey Democratic		William Dyke Republican		William H. Upham American		Crazy Jim Independent		All others Various		Margin		Total votes cast
County	#	%	#	%	#	%	#	%	#	%	#	%	Total votes cast
Adams	1,444	44.71%	1,675	51.86%	76	2.35%	11	0.34%	24	0.74%	-231	-7.15%	3,230
Ashland	3,028	64.48%	1,525	32.47%	79	1.68%	24	0.51%	40	0.85%	1,503	32.01%	4,696
Barron	4,709	54.15%	3,784	43.51%	143	1.64%	33	0.38%	27	0.31%	925	10.64%	8,696
Bayfield	2,447	62.60%	1,358	34.74%	57	1.46%	29	0.74%	18	0.46%	1,089	27.86%	3,909
Brown	21,323	47.94%	20,591	46.29%	1,972	4.43%	287	0.65%	310	0.70%	732	1.65%	44,483
Buffalo	2,596	55.34%	1,974	42.08%	79	1.68%	27	0.58%	15	0.32%	622	13.26%	4,691
Burnett	2,137	68.43%	931	29.81%	33	1.06%	10	0.32%	12	0.38%	1,206	38.62%	3,123
Calumet	4,073	48.83%	3,945	47.30%	248	2.97%	53	0.64%	22	0.26%	128	1.53%	8,341
Chippewa	7,054	56.70%	4,566	36.70%	630	5.06%	114 (Note: The 1975 Blue Book contains a typo in this county; the correct figure is 114 not 144)	0.92%	76	0.61%	2,488	20.00%	12,440
Clark	4,439	51.00%	3,445	39.58%	723	8.31%	67	0.77%	30	0.34%	994	11.42%	8,704
Columbia	4,798	39.31%	7,178	58.81%	110	0.90%	66	0.54%	53	0.43%	-2,380	-19.50%	12,205
Crawford	2,665	53.01%	2,68	45.12%	60	1.19%	12	0.24%	22	0.44%	397	7.90%	5,027
Dane	50,648	60.13%	28,580	33.93%	934	1.11%	626	0.74%	3,445	4.09%	22,068	26.20%	84,233
Dodge	8,268	41.61%	11,055	55.63%	325	1.64%	164	0.83%	60	0.30%	-2,787	-14.02%	19,872
Door	3,021	41.09%	4,088	55.60%	190	2.58%	28	0.38%	25	0.34%	-1,067	-14.51%	7,352
Douglas	9,275	76.32%	2,611	21.49%	89	0.73%	67	0.55%	110	0.91%	6,664	54.84%	12,152
Dunn	4,191	52.68%	3,289	41.34%	365	4.59%	55	0.69%	56	0.70%	902	11.34%	7,956
Eau Claire	10,717	55.07%	7,563	38.86%	841	4.32%	172	0.88%	169	0.87%	3,154	16.21%	19,462
Florence	579	57.50%	392	38.93%	18	1.79%	13	1.29%	5	0.50%	187	18.57%	1,007
Fond du Lac	9,901	42.44%	12,105	51.88%	896	3.84%	305	1.31%	124	0.53%	-2,204	-9.45%	23,331
Forest	1,215	56.25%	769	35.60%	137	6.34%	28	1.30%	11	0.51%	446	20.65%	2,160
Grant	5,445	36.78%	8,861	59.85%	322	2.17%	76	0.51%	102	0.69%	-3,416	-23.07%	14,806
Green	2,422	29.46%	5,699	69.32%	68	0.83%	18	0.22%	14	0.17%	-3,277	-39.86%	8,221
Green Lake	1,410	28.61%	3,292	66.80%	186	3.77%	21	0.43%	19	0.39%	-1,882	-38.19%	4,928
Iowa	1,937	35.76%	3,372	62.25%	42	0.78%	25	0.46%	41	0.76%	-1,435	-26.49%	5,417
Iron	1,329	61.19%	653	30.06%	29	1.34%	150	6.91%	11	0.51%	676	31.12%	2,172
Jackson	2,073	47.93%	2,182	50.45%	43	0.99%	20	0.46%	7	0.16%	-109	-2.52%	4,325
Jefferson	7,770	43.88%	9,498	53.63%	242	1.37%	129	0.73%	70	0.40%	-1,728	-9.76%	17,709
Juneau	2,223	37.40%	3,602	60.60%	68	1.14%	21	0.35%	30	0.50%	-1,379	-23.20%	5,944
Kenosha	16,708	63.45%	8,698	33.03%	448	1.70%	300	1.14%	179	0.68%	8,010	30.42%	26,333
Kewaunee	2,424	40.93%	2,921	49.32%	536	9.05%	26	0.44%	16	0.27%	-497	-8.39%	5,923
La Crosse	10,843	42.52%	14,124	55.39%	335	1.31%	96	0.38%	102	0.40%	-3,281	-12.87%	25,500
Lafayette	1,838	33.02%	3,653	65.62%	50	0.90%	14	0.25%	12	0.22%	-1,815	-32.60%	5,567
Langlade	3,475	52.79%	2,820	42.84%	171	2.60%	83	1.26%	34	0.52%	655	9.95%	6,583
Lincoln	4,199	47.85%	4,186	47.70%	307	3.50%	45	0.51%	39	0.44%	13	0.15%	8,776
Manitowoc	11,802	49.26%	9,523	39.75%	2,319	9.68%	152	0.63%	164	0.68%	2,279	9.51%	23,960
Marathon	13,265	47.41%	12,414	44.37%	1,928	6.89%	232	0.83%	141	0.50%	851	3.04%	27,980
Marinette	5,870	51.24%	5,226	45.62%	234	2.04%	84	0.73%	41	0.36%	644	5.62%	11,455
Marquette	1,211	35.40%	2,106	61.56%	59	1.72%	34	0.99%	11	0.32%	-895	-26.16%	3,421
Menominee	472	83.10%	63	11.09%	11	1.94%	10	1.76%	12	2.11%	409	72.01%	568
Milwaukee	141,383	62.86%	69,989	31.12%	6,403	2.85%	5,228	2.32%	1,910	0.85%	71,394	31.74%	224,913
Monroe	3,234	40.52%	4,594	57.56%	119	1.49%	26	0.33%	8	0.10%	-1,360	-17.04%	7,981
Oconto	3,458	44.89%	3,876	50.31%	284	3.69%	56	0.73%	30	0.39%	-418	-5.43%	7,704
Oneida	3,661	46.70%	3,786	48.29%	280	3.57%	93	1.19%	20	0.26%	-125	-1.59%	7,840
Outagamie	16,494	53.01%	13,417	43.12%	866	2.78%	197	0.63%	141	0.45%	3,077	9.89%	31,115
Ozaukee	8,791	48.74%	8,393	46.53%	553	3.07%	234	1.30%	66	0.37%	398	2.21%	18,037
Pepin	1,272	63.95%	661	33.23%	40	2.01%	9	0.45%	7	0.35%	611	30.72%	1,989
Pierce	5,048	61.31%	2,969	36.06%	108	1.31%	43	0.52%	66	0.80%	2,079	25.25%	8,234
Polk	5,380	64.07%	2,879	34.29%	89	1.06%	19	0.23%	30	0.36%	2,501	29.78%	8,397
Portage	8,185	63.01%	3,962	30.50%	396	3.05%	296	2.28%	150	1.15%	4,223	32.51%	12,989
Price	2,309	52.42%	1,912	43.41%	137	3.11%	30	0.68%	17	0.39%	397	9.01%	4,405
Racine	23,999	59.48%	15,215	37.71%	562	1.39%	432	1.07%	140	0.35%	8,784	21.77%	40,348
Richland	1,844	35.08%	3,344	63.61%	31	0.59%	15	0.29%	23	0.44%	-1,500	-28.53%	5,257
Rock	17,077	52.92%	14,415	44.67%	472	1.46%	161	0.50%	144	0.45%	2,662	8.25%	32,269
Rusk	2,780	58.11%	1,817	37.98%	138	2.88%	34	0.71%	15	0.31%	963	20.13%	4,784
Sauk	3,919	36.13%	6,626	61.09%	86	0.79%	37	0.34%	178	1.64%	-2,707	-24.96%	10,846
Sawyer	1,808	51.89%	1,584	45.46%	47	1.35%	30	0.86%	15	0.43%	224	6.43%	3,484
Shawano	3,353	39.41%	4,685	55.07%	419	4.93%	41	0.48%	9	0.11%	-1,332	-15.66%	8,507
Sheboygan	18,951	59.98%	11,988	37.94%	407	1.29%	170	0.54%	81	0.26%	6,963	22.04%	31,597
St. Croix	6,260	64.85%	3,191	33.06%	124	1.28%	43	0.45%	35	0.36%	3,069	31.79%	9,653
Taylor	2,422	54.00%	1,743	38.86%	216	4.82%	62	1.38%	42	0.94%	679	15.14%	4,485
Trempealeau	3,787	54.92%	2,983	43.26%	100	1.45%	10	0.15%	15	0.22%	804	11.66%	6,895
Vernon	3,160	41.49%	4,339	56.96%	76	1.00%	21	0.28%	21	0.28%	-1,179	-15.48%	7,617
Vilas	2,054	39.36%	2,948	56.50%	143	2.74%	49	0.94%	24	0.46%	-894	-17.13%	5,218
Walworth	7,109	44.74%	8,377	52.72%	169	1.06%	158	0.99%	77	0.48%	-1,268	-7.98%	15,890
Washburn	2,298	60.54%	1,400	36.88%	57	1.50%	22	0.58%	19	0.50%	898	23.66%	3,796
Washington	9,799	54.84%	7,382	41.32%	401	2.24%	240	1.34%	45	0.25%	2,417	13.53%	17,867
Waukesha	33,630	52.01%	28,030	43.35%	1,863	2.88%	66	0.10%	1,067	1.65%	5,600	8.66%	64,656
Waupaca	3,542	36.50%	5,815	59.92%	257	2.65%	68	0.70%	22	0.23%	-2,273	-23.42%	9,704
Waushara	1,487	34.11%	2,660	61.01%	162	3.72%	47	1.08%	4	0.09%	-1,173	-26.90%	4,360
Winnebago	16,068	44.56%	17,908	49.66%	1,422	3.94%	439	1.22%	224	0.62%	1,840	5.10%	36,061
Wood	8,833	47.95%	7,722	41.92%	1,698	9.22%	100	0.54%	67	0.36%	1,111	6.03%	18,420
Total	628,639	53.19%	497,195	42.06%	33,528	2.84%	12,203	1.03%	10,411	0.88%	131,444	11.12%	1,181,976

==== Counties that flipped from Republican to Democratic ====
- Crawford
- Outagamie
- Ozaukee
- Sawyer
- Waukesha

==== Counties that flipped from Democratic to Republican ====
- Adams
- Jackson
- Kewaunee
- Oconto
- Oneida
