= 1958 Wisconsin lieutenant gubernatorial election =

- November 4, 1958
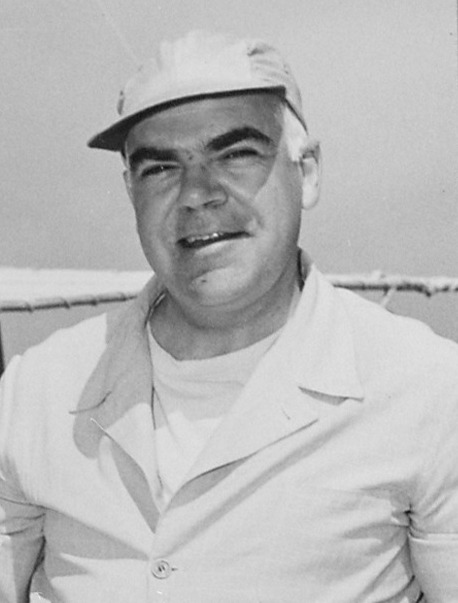

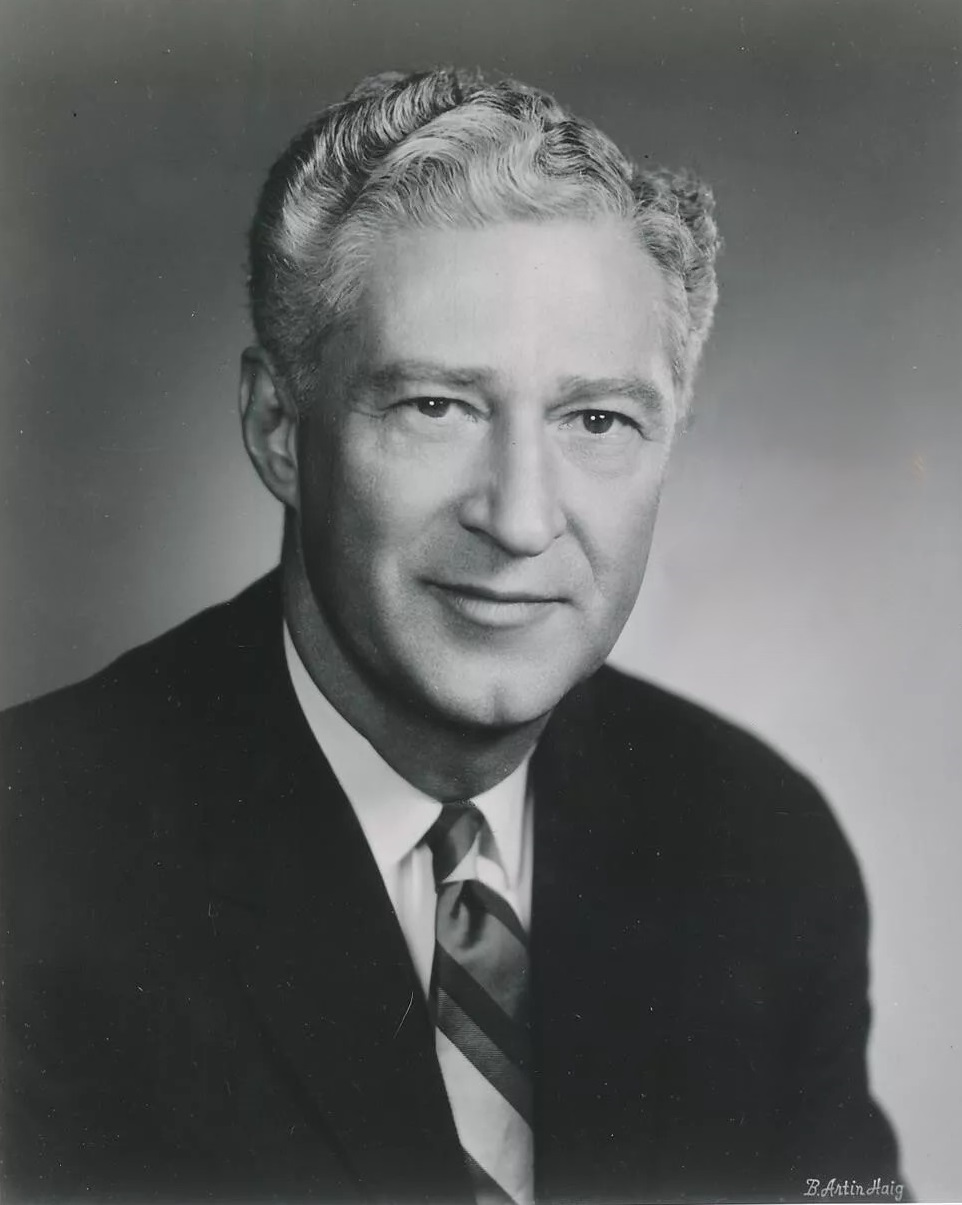
Nominee	Philleo Nash	Warren P. Knowles
Party	Democratic	Republican
Popular vote	587,209	581,061
Percentage	50.26%	49.74%
Lieutenant Governor before election
Warren P. Knowles
Republican
Elected Lieutenant Governor
Philleo Nash
Democratic

The 1958 Wisconsin lieutenant gubernatorial election was held on November 4, 1958, in order to elect the lieutenant governor of Wisconsin. Democratic nominee and former Chair of the Democratic Party of Wisconsin Philleo Nash defeated incumbent Republican lieutenant governor Warren P. Knowles.

== Republican primary ==
The Republican primary election was held on September 9, 1958. Incumbent lieutenant governor Warren P. Knowles received a majority of the votes (73.58%) over former lieutenant governor George M. Smith and incumbent member of the Wisconsin Senate Leo P. O'Brien, and was thus elected as the nominee for the general election.

=== Results ===
1958 Republican lieutenant gubernatorial primary
Party	Candidate	Votes	%
Republican	Warren P. Knowles (incumbent)	183,671	73.58%
Republican	George M. Smith	37,583	15.06%
Republican	Leo P. O'Brien	28,352	11.36%
Total votes		249,606	100.00%

== Democratic primary ==
The Democratic primary election was held on September 9, 1958. Former Chair of the Democratic Party of Wisconsin Philleo Nash received a plurality of the votes (47.34%), and was thus elected as the nominee for the general election.

=== Results ===
1958 Democratic lieutenant gubernatorial primary
Party	Candidate	Votes	%
Democratic	Philleo Nash	110,526	47.34%
Democratic	Jerome D. Grant	93,091	39.88%
Democratic	Albert Di Piazza	29,848	12.78%
Total votes		233,465	100.00%

== General election ==
On election day, November 4, 1958, Democratic nominee Philleo Nash won the election by a margin of 6,148 votes against his opponent incumbent Republican lieutenant governor Warren P. Knowles, thereby gaining Democratic control over the office of lieutenant governor. Nash was sworn in as the 33rd lieutenant governor of Wisconsin on January 5, 1959.

=== Results ===
Wisconsin lieutenant gubernatorial election, 1958
Party	Candidate	Votes	%
Democratic	Philleo Nash	587,209	50.26
Republican	Warren P. Knowles (incumbent)	581,061	49.74
	Scattering	40	0.00
Total votes		1,168,310	100.00
Democratic gain from Republican			
