= 1964 Wisconsin gubernatorial election =

- November 3, 1964
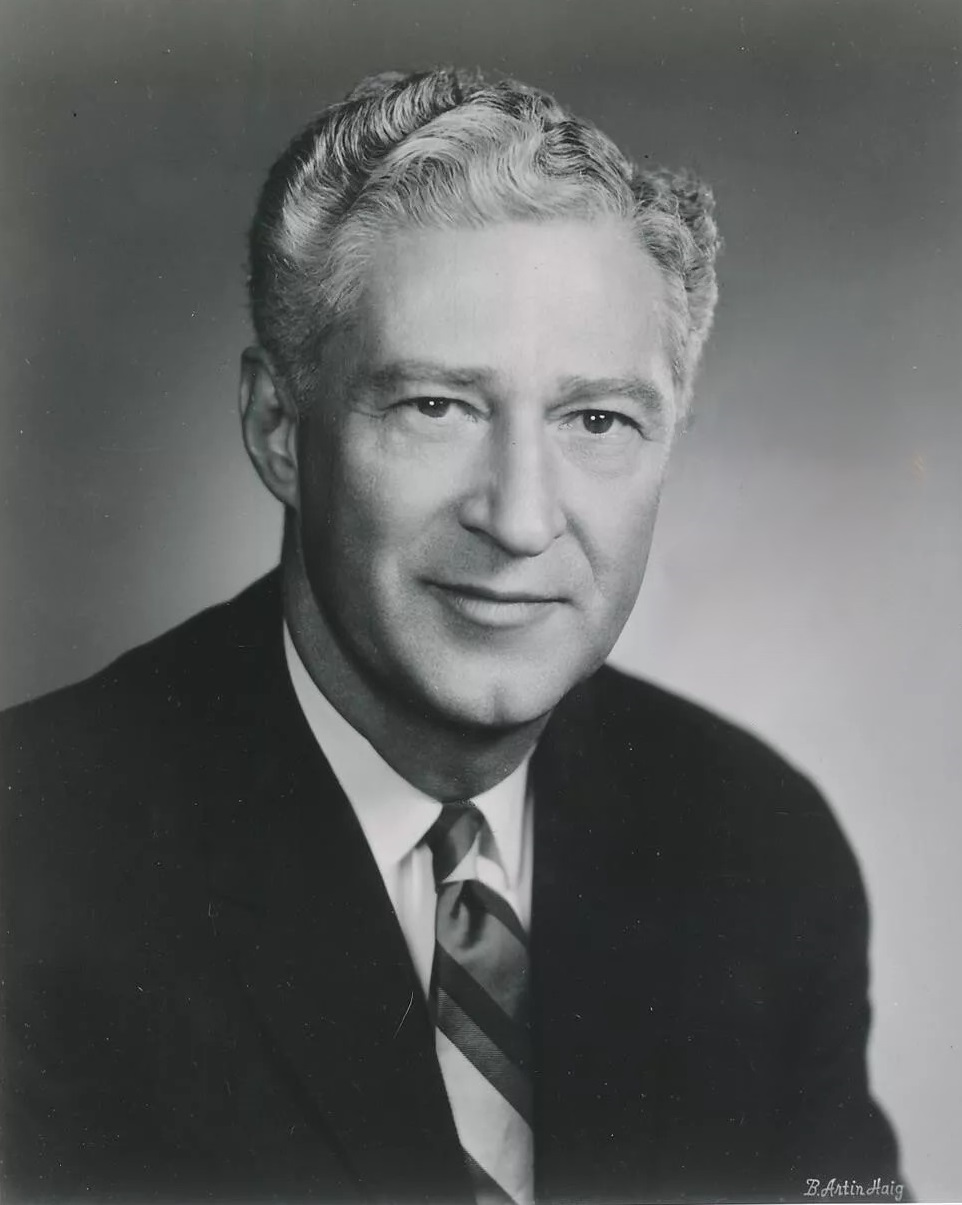

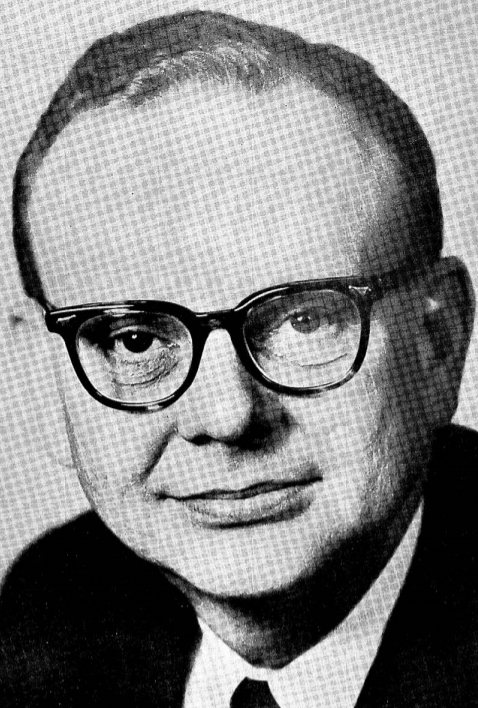
Nominee	Warren P. Knowles	John W. Reynolds
Party	Republican	Democratic
Popular vote	856,779	837,901
Percentage	50.55%	49.44%
- County results Knowles: 50–60% 60–70% Reynolds: 50–60% 60–70%
Governor before election
John W. Reynolds
Democratic
Elected Governor
Warren P. Knowles
Republican

The 1964 Wisconsin gubernatorial election was held on November 3, 1964. Republican Warren P. Knowles won the election with 50.55% of the vote, winning his first term as Governor of Wisconsin and narrowly defeating incumbent Democrat John W. Reynolds.

== Primary election ==
The primary election was held on September 8, 1964.

=== Democratic party ===
==== Candidates ====
- Dominic H. Frinzi
- John W. Reynolds, incumbent governor

==== Results ====
Democratic primary results
Party	Candidate	Votes	%
Democratic	John W. Reynolds (incumbent)	241,170	70.26%
Democratic	Dominic H. Frinzi	102,066	29.74%
Total votes		343,236	100.00%

=== Republican party ===
==== Candidates ====
- Warren P. Knowles, former Lieutenant Governor of Wisconsin
- Milo G. Knutson, Mayor of La Crosse

==== Results ====
Republican primary results
Party	Candidate	Votes	%
Republican	Warren P. Knowles	246,760	71.90%
Republican	Milo G. Knutson	96,421	28.10%
Total votes		343.181	100.00%

== General election ==
=== Candidates ===
- Warren P. Knowles, Republican
- John W. Reynolds, Democrat

=== Results ===
1964 Wisconsin gubernatorial election
Party	Candidate	Votes	%	±%
Republican	Warren P. Knowles	856,779	50.55%	+1.14%
Democratic	John W. Reynolds (incumbent)	837,901	49.44%	−0.92%
	Scattering (Note: These are not listed in the Blue Book but are listed in the Board of Canvassers report.)	207	0.01%	
Majority		18,878	1.11%	
Total votes		1,694,887	100.00%	
Republican gain from Democratic		Swing	+2.06%	

=== Results by county ===
After this election, Racine county would not vote for the losing candidate again until 2006.

County	Warren P. Knowles Republican		John W. Reynolds Democratic		Scattering Write-in		Margin		Total votes cast
County	#	%	#	%	#	%	#	%	Total votes cast
Adams	1,724	50.19%	1,711	49.81%	0	0.00%	13	0.38%	3,435
Ashland	3,206	42.80%	4,284	57.20%	0	0.00%	-1,078	-14.39%	7,490
Barron	7,561	53.95%	6,454	46.05%	0	0.00%	1,107	7.90%	14,015
Bayfield	2,357	42.19%	3,229	57.79%	1	0.02%	-872	-15.61%	5,587
Brown	29,576	55.76%	23,469	44.24%	1	0.00%	6,107	11.51%	53,046
Buffalo	2,985	52.85%	2,663	47.15%	0	0.00%	322	5.70%	5,648
Burnett	2,133	49.64%	2,164	50.36%	0	0.00%	-31	-0.72%	4,297
Calumet	5,652	60.89%	3,631	39.11%	0	0.00%	2,021	21.77%	9,273
Chippewa	8,557	50.01%	8,552	49.98%	1	0.01%	5	0.03%	17,110
Clark	7,185	56.70%	5,486	43.30%	0	0.00%	1,699	13.41%	12,671
Columbia	9,359	57.82%	6,827	42.18%	1	0.01%	2,532	15.64%	16,187
Crawford	3,920	59.09%	2,714	40.91%	0	0.00%	1,206	18.18%	6,634
Dane	44,054	45.27%	53,246	54.72%	15	0.02%	-9,192	-9.45%	97,315
Dodge	15,323	58.35%	10,937	41.65%	0	0.00%	4,386	16.70%	26,260
Door	5,670	64.95%	3,059	35.04%	1	0.01%	2,611	29.91%	8,730
Douglas	6,958	35.93%	12,410	64.07%	0	0.00%	-5,452	-28.15%	19,368
Dunn	5,608	54.73%	4,638	45.27%	0	0.00%	970	9.47%	10,246
Eau Claire	11,807	48.67%	12,450	51.32%	1	0.00%	-643	-2.65%	24,258
Florence	697	43.48%	906	56.52%	0	0.00%	-209	-13.04%	1,603
Fond du Lac	17,966	57.79%	13,120	42.21%	0	0.00%	4,846	15.59%	31,086
Forest	1,585	45.26%	1,917	54.74%	0	0.00%	-332	-9.48%	3,502
Grant	10,483	61.81%	6,477	38.19%	1	0.01%	4,006	23.62%	16,961
Green	7,204	67.73%	3,432	32.27%	0	0.00%	3,772	35.46%	10,636
Green Lake	5,014	65.11%	2,687	34.89%	0	0.00%	2,327	30.22%	7,701
Iowa	4,889	62.42%	2,943	37.57%	1	0.01%	1,946	24.84%	7,833
Iron	1,303	38.97%	2,041	31.03%	0	0.00%	-738	-22.07%	3,344
Jackson	3,584	57.31%	2,668	42.66%	2	0.03%	916	14.65%	6,254
Jefferson	12,561	56.55%	9,650	43.44%	2	0.01%	2,911	13.10%	22,213
Juneau	4,399	58.10%	3,173	41.90%	0	0.00%	1,226	16.19%	7,572
Kenosha	19,234	42.51%	26,016	57.49%	1	0.00%	-6,782	-14.99%	45,251
Kewaunee	4,633	60.12%	3,073	39.88%	0	0.00%	1,560	20.24%	7,706
La Crosse	18,144	58.92%	12,642	41.06%	6	0.02%	5,502	17.87%	30,792
Lafayette	4,427	58.47%	3,144	41.52%	1	0.01%	1,283	16.94%	7,572
Langlade	4,463	55.32%	3,604	44.68%	0	0.00%	859	10.65%	8,067
Lincoln	5,340	54.65%	4,427	45.30%	5	0.05%	913	9.34%	9,772
Manitowoc	15,293	47.95%	16,602	52.05%	0	0.00%	-1,309	-4.10%	31,895
Marathon	19,102	50.50%	18,726	49.50%	1	0.00%	376	0.99%	37,829
Marinette	7,583	50.90%	7,314	49.09%	1	0.01%	269	1.81%	14,898
Marquette	2,488	65.66%	1,301	34.34%	0	0.00%	1,187	31.33%	3,789
Menominee	314	45.64%	374	54.36%	0	0.00%	-60	-8.72%	688
Milwaukee	183,668	41.79%	255,726	58.19%	101	0.02%	-72,058	-16.40%	439,495
Monroe	6,904	60.24%	4,550	39.70%	6	0.05%	2,354	20.54%	11,460
Oconto	5,901	54.79%	4,870	45.21%	0	0.00%	1,031	9.57%	10,771
Oneida	5,197	50.37%	5,120	49.62%	1	0.01%	77	0.75%	10,318
Outagamie	24,445	60.58%	15,904	39.42%	0	0.00%	8,541	21.17%	40,349
Ozaukee	10,695	59.50%	7,279	40.49%	2	0.01%	3,416	19.00%	17,976
Pepin	1,719	55.03%	1,405	44.97%	0	0.00%	314	10.05%	3,124
Pierce	4,894	51.36%	4,633	48.63%	1	0.01%	261	2.74%	9,528
Polk	5,229	48.22%	5,615	51.78%	0	0.00%	-386	-3.56%	10,844
Portage	6,928	41.96%	9,581	58.03%	1	0.01%	-2,653	-16.07%	16,510
Price	3,543	53.10%	3,111	46.63%	18	0.27%	432	6.47%	6,672
Racine	28,243	45.97%	33,194	54.03%	0	0.00%	-4,951	-8.06%	61,437
Richland	4,448	60.92%	2,853	39.08%	0	0.00%	1,595	21.85%	7,301
Rock	27,073	55.79%	21,454	44.21%	0	0.00%	5,619	11.58%	48,527
Rusk	2,944	46.66%	3,365	53.34%	0	0.00%	-421	-6.67%	6,309
Sauk	9,333	60.17%	6,178	39.83%	1	0.01%	3,155	20.34%	15,512
Sawyer	2,630	58.44%	1,870	41.56%	0	0.00%	760	16.89%	4,500
Shawano	8,354	63.84%	4,727	36.13%	4	0.03%	3,627	27.72%	13,085
Sheboygan	18,757	46.80%	21,320	53.19%	3	0.01%	-2,563	-6.39%	40,080
St. Croix	7,202	54.80%	5,941	45.20%	0	0.00%	1,261	9.59%	13,143
Taylor	3,394	49.74%	3,429	50.25%	1	0.01%	-35	-0.51%	6,824
Trempealeau	4,797	50.71%	4,659	49.25%	4	0.04%	138	1.46%	9,460
Vernon	6,423	60.05%	4,266	39.88%	7	0.07%	2,157	20.17%	10,696
Vilas	3,396	60.26%	2,239	39.73%	1	0.02%	1,157	20.53%	5,636
Walworth	14,889	62.53%	8,918	37.45%	5	0.02%	5,971	25.08%	23,812
Washburn	2,481	50.22%	2,457	49.74%	2	0.04%	24	0.49%	4,940
Washington	12,349	59.59%	8,371	40.39%	3	0.01%	3,978	19.20%	20,723
Waukesha	43,767	57.28%	32,638	42.72%	3	0.00%	11,129	14.57%	76,408
Waupaca	10,382	67.51%	4,997	32.49%	0	0.00%	5,385	35.02%	15,379
Waushara	4,254	65.95%	2,196	34.05%	0	0.00%	2,058	31.91%	6,450
Winnebago	26,047	57.92%	18,922	42.08%	0	0.00%	7,125	15.84%	44,969
Wood	12,152	50.41%	11,952	49.58%	1	0.00%	200	0.83%	24,105
Total	856,779	50.55%	837,901	49.44%	207	0.01%	18,878	1.11%	1,694,887

==== Counties that flipped from Democratic to Republican ====
- Adams
- Chippewa
- Kewaunee
- Langlade
- Marathon
- Pepin
- Price
- St. Croix
- Trempealeau

==== Counties that flipped from Republican to Democratic ====
- Eau Claire
- Menominee
