= Paul Rosenfels =

American psychiatrist (1909–1985)

- Born: March 21, 1909
- Died: 1985; New York
- Education: University of Chicago
- Known for: psychological polarity, character specialization, introversion, extroversion, femininity, masculinity
- Scientific career
- Fields: psychology, science of human nature
- Workplaces: American Board of Psychiatry and Neurology

Paul Rosenfels (March 21, 1909 in Chicago – 1985 in New York City) was an American psychiatrist and psychoanalyst. Rosenfels is known as one of the first American social scientists to publish about homosexuality as part of the human condition, as opposed to his contemporaries who largely defined homosexuality as an illness or deviation. After leaving the academic field of psychiatry in the 1940s, he developed some of his thinking and a larger philosophy. He published Homosexuality: The Psychology of the Creative Process in 1971, along with other books discussing psychiatry and psychoanalysis.

In the 1940s Rosenfels left Chicago and his family, moving to California. He moved to New York City in 1962, where he established a private practice. He devoted himself to developing the foundations of a "science of human nature." In 1973 with Dean Hannotte, he founded the Ninth Street Center in New York City, which provided peer counseling and discussion groups.

== Early life and education ==
Paul Rosenfels was born in 1909 into a Jewish family in Oak Park, Illinois. He had an older brother, Richard, an identical twin brother, Walter, and a younger sister, Edith Nash. His mother was politically liberal. She served on the Abraham Lincoln Center Board on the South Side of Chicago. His father, a businessman who supported capitalism, died in 1935. In terms of family dynamics, Edith believed she was the favorite of their father. She said he found the boys difficult to deal with, and Richard was preferred by their mother. Richard earned a PhD in botany. Paul became a psychiatrist and psychoanalyst, and Walter worked in ad copywriting, where he had more flexibility.

As they grew up, the three brothers realized they were homosexual, but never discussed it openly with their parents. Only Paul among the brothers married and had a child. Edith married, became an educator and poet, and had two children.

Rosenfels' first passion was history, and in high school he drafted a book on the causes of war. In college he met Harold D. Lasswell, who told him that new insights into the psychology of war and the politicians who cause them would in the future be provided by the new science of psychoanalysis. Convinced that this tool could help him make an important contribution to the welfare of humanity, Rosenfels spent the next decade doing undergraduate work at the University of Chicago and earning an M.D. at Rush Medical College; he became board-certified as a psychiatrist.

During this period Rosenfels married Joan Maris, a friend of his sister Edith. They had a son together: Danny.

== Professional career ==
Beginning to practice psychiatry, Rosenfels also studied with Franz Alexander, a former student of Sigmund Freud, at the Institute for Psychoanalysis in Chicago. He became licensed as a psychoanalyst.

He served as a Lt. Colonel in the Medical Corps during World War II. After his return, he taught as an Assistant Professor of Psychiatry at the University of Chicago, particularly in psychiatry and law.

Rosenfels rapidly developed a successful private practice and was especially effective in helping women. He lectured at the University of Chicago on psychiatry and the law. After achieving these successes, he became more interested in working to develop larger ideas about human nature, rather than be constrained by details of diagnosis of psychiatric illnesses.

=== Science of human nature ===
Rosenfels began to feel that he did not belong in the academic fraternity. He was interested in the larger views of philosophers such as Bertrand Russell and David Hume, who held that the most important task for moral philosophers was the founding of a science of human nature. Rosenfels believed that it was insufficient to focus on the physiology of the nervous system and rejected the idea that concepts such as love and power could not be studied by scientific methods.

After serving in the military, Rosenfels accepted a job as Chief Psychiatrist, Reception-Guidance Center of the Department of Corrections, State of California. He had to leave as he did not have a medical license in California. He returned to the Chicago area for a time in his last institutional position, as Chief of the Outpatient Clinic, Forest Hospital, in Des Plaines, Illinois.

Rosenfels left Illinois, returning to California, where he supported himself by working as a cook. At the same time, he abandoned his effort to fit into the mainstream by suppressing his homosexuality. He had married and had a family, but was no longer willing to accept psychiatrists’ classification of homosexuality as an illness to be controlled and denied. He wanted to accept what he could only call "something feminine" about himself. He believed at the time that his professional colleagues would never accept him again if he openly espoused these ideas.

Rosenfels was rethinking his ideas about human nature. He developed "polarity" as an organizing principle within and among individuals. In his mature works, he uses his unified and self-consistent vocabulary to explore human nature.

In the early 1960s, he lived for a short time with his sister Edith and her family in Washington, DC, when he was in crisis. He had stayed with his brother Walter for a time before that.

=== The Ninth Street Center ===
In 1962 Rosenfels moved to New York City, where he established a private practice that attracted numerous gay men. In 1971 he published Homosexuality: The Psychology of the Creative Process, the first book that suggested it was a valid way to live. Gay Magazine described Rosenfels as "the Giant of the New Free Gay Culture." Some of his clients in therapy became students of his thinking.

In 1973 he, Dean Hannotte, and their students opened The Ninth Street Center on the Lower East Side, an all-volunteer organization devoted to helping unconventional people live creatively in the world. It initially attracted many young gay men. As the Center slowly matured, its members served a growing community of lesbians, as well as gay men, and straight people. Their clients included people who believed that human potential, in the words of one of their pamphlets, was "too important to leave to professionals."

== Works ==
- 1962, Love and Power, self-published, Libra Press
- 1971, Homosexuality: The Psychology of the Creative Process, reprinted in 1973, paperback in 1986
- 1975, The Relationship of Adaptation and Fun and Pleasure to Psychological Growth (Ninth Street Center monograph)
- 1977, The Nature of Civilization: A Psychological Analysis (Ninth Street Center Monograph)
- 1979, A Renegade Psychiatrist's Story (Ninth Street Center monograph)
- 1980, Freud and the Scientific Method (Ninth Street Center monograph)
- 1987, The Nature of Psychological Maturity (Ninth Street Center monograph)
