= Patrick Lucey =

American politician (1918–2014)

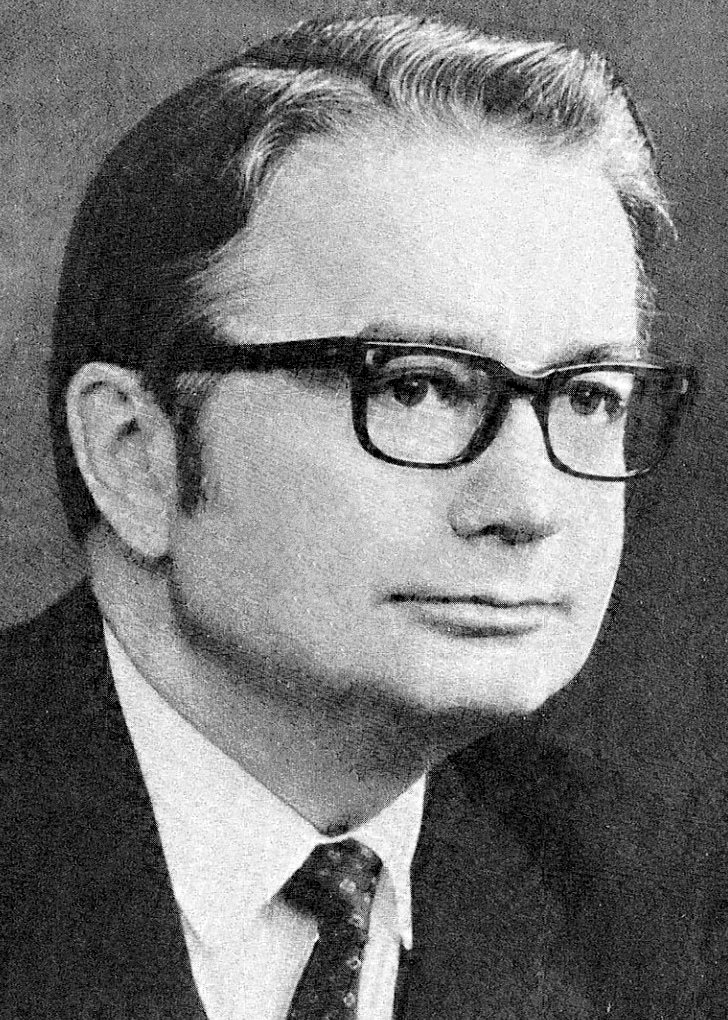
- Lucey in 1971

United States Ambassador to Mexico
- In office July 19, 1977 – October 31, 1979
- President: Jimmy Carter
- Preceded by: Joseph Jova
- Succeeded by: Julian Nava

38th Governor of Wisconsin
- In office January 4, 1971 – July 6, 1977
- Lieutenant: Martin Schreiber
- Preceded by: Warren Knowles
- Succeeded by: Martin Schreiber

36th Lieutenant Governor of Wisconsin
- In office January 4, 1965 – January 2, 1967
- Governor: Warren Knowles
- Preceded by: Jack Olson
- Succeeded by: Jack Olson

Chair of the Wisconsin Democratic Party
- In office 1957–1963
- Preceded by: Philleo Nash
- Succeeded by: Louis Hanson

Member of the Wisconsin State Assembly from Crawford County
- In office 1949–1951
- Preceded by: Donald C. McDowell
- Succeeded by: Rodney J. Satter

Personal details
- Born: Patrick Joseph Lucey; March 21, 1918 La Crosse, Wisconsin, U.S.
- Died: May 10, 2014 (aged 96) Milwaukee, Wisconsin, U.S.
- Party: Democratic (before 1979; 1980–2014); Independent (1979–1980)
- Spouse: Jean Vlasis (m. 1951; died 2011)
- Children: 3
- Education: University of St. Thomas, Minnesota; University of Wisconsin, Madison (BA)

Patrick Joseph Lucey (March 21, 1918 – May 10, 2014) was an American politician who served as the United States ambassador to Mexico from 1977 to 1979. A member of the Democratic Party, he previously served as the 38th governor of Wisconsin from 1971 to 1977. Lucey was also the running mate of independent presidential nominee John B. Anderson in the 1980 presidential election.

Born in La Crosse, Wisconsin, Lucey served in state and local government offices after graduating from the University of Wisconsin. He served in the Quartermaster Corps of the United States Army during World War II. He held the position of Lieutenant Governor of Wisconsin from 1965 to 1967 and unsuccessfully challenged Governor Warren P. Knowles in the 1966 gubernatorial election.

Lucey was elected governor of Wisconsin in the 1970 gubernatorial election and was reelected in 1974. He resigned as governor in 1977, when he accepted President Jimmy Carter's appointment to the position of United States Ambassador to Mexico. As governor, Lucey presided over the merger of the Wisconsin State University system and the University of Wisconsin System. In 1980, he agreed to serve as the running mate to John B. Anderson, a former Republican congressman running an independent campaign. The ticket of Anderson and Lucey won 6.6% of the popular vote in the 1980 election, which saw Carter unseated by Republican nominee Ronald Reagan.

== Early life and education ==
Lucey was born in La Crosse, Wisconsin, on March 21, 1918, the son of Ella (McNamara) and Gregory Lucey. He grew up in the village of Ferryville, Wisconsin, and graduated from Campion High School in nearby Prairie du Chien, Wisconsin, in 1935. He later attended St. Thomas College in Saint Paul, Minnesota. During World War II Lucey was drafted and served in the United States Army Quartermaster Corps in the Caribbean until he was discharged with the rank of captain in 1945. After the war, Lucey graduated from the University of Wisconsin in 1946 with a B.A. in philosophy.

== Political career ==
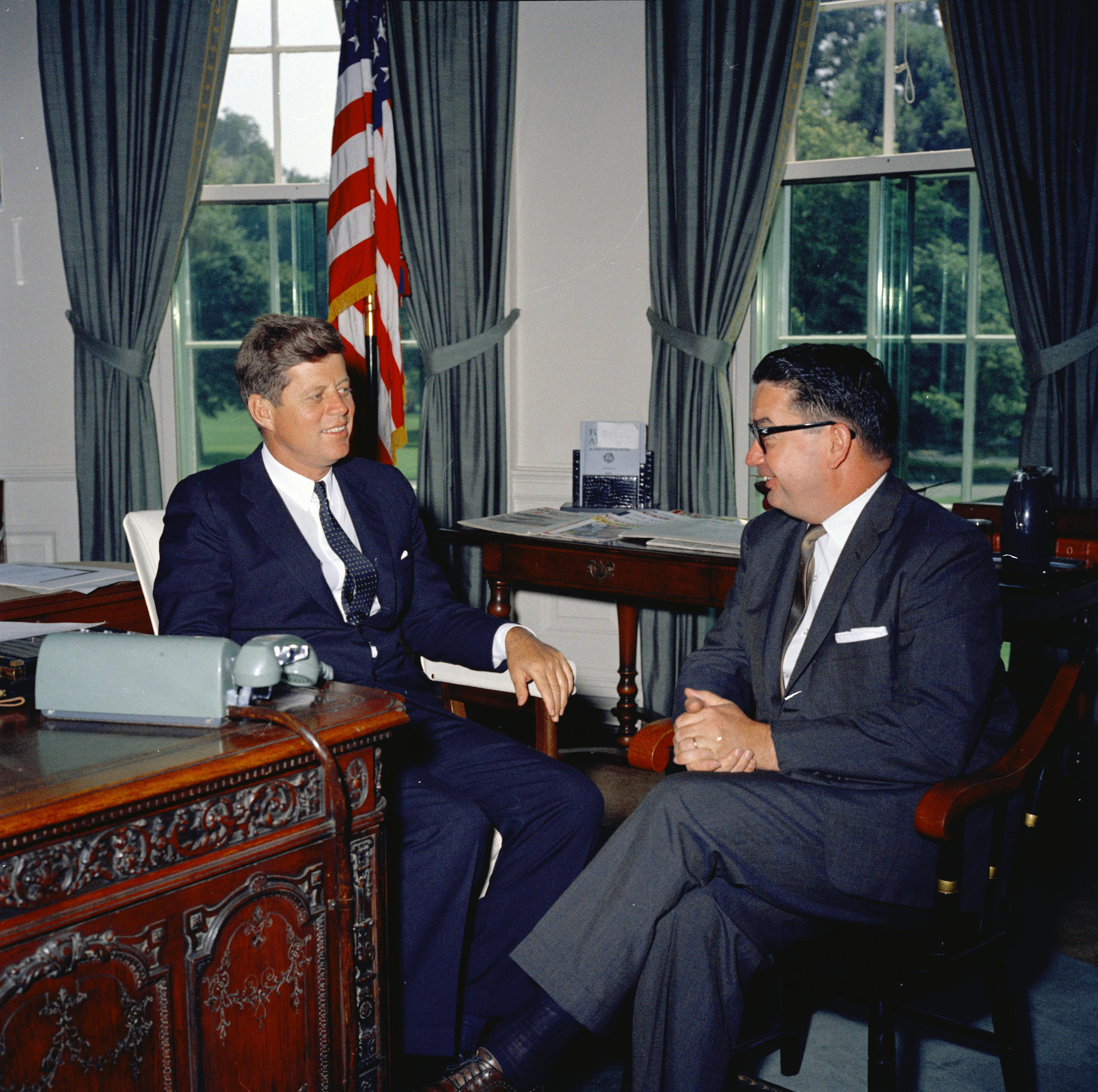
Lucey with President John F. Kennedy in 1961

Lucey served as justice of the peace in Ferryville, Wisconsin, in 1946. He also served on the De Soto School Board and was board treasurer in 1946. Lucey served in the Wisconsin State Assembly from 1949 to 1951. From 1957 to 1963 he served as state chairman of the Democratic Party. Lucey was a Wisconsin campaign aide of John F. Kennedy in his presidential run in 1960.

In 1964, Lucey was elected Lieutenant Governor of Wisconsin and served one term from 1965 to 1967. At this time the governor and lieutenant governor of Wisconsin were elected on separate tickets, and voters chose Lucey, a Democrat, as lieutenant governor while simultaneously electing Republican Warren P. Knowles as governor (An amendment to the Wisconsin Constitution in 1967 combined elections for governor and lieutenant governor onto a single ticket).

Lucey ran as the Democratic candidate for governor of Wisconsin in 1966 but failed to unseat incumbent Warren Knowles. He was initially a supporter of Senator Robert F. Kennedy in his 1968 presidential bid, but began working for Senator Eugene McCarthy's presidential campaign following Kennedy's assassination. He was the acting director of the McCarthy campaign at the 1968 Democratic National Convention. In 1970, Lucey campaigned again for governor and was elected with 54 percent of the vote. Lucey was the first Wisconsin governor elected to a four-year term after a 1967 amendment to the state constitution extended terms from two years to four. He took office on January 4, 1971. Lucey ran successfully for a second term as governor in 1974, and served until his resignation on July 6, 1977, to accept a nomination as United States Ambassador to Mexico.

== University of Wisconsin System merger ==
One of Lucey's executive initiatives was to revive an idea to merge the state's two university systems, the Wisconsin State University (WSU) system and the University of Wisconsin System, with campuses at Madison, Milwaukee, Green Bay, and Parkside (Racine–Kenosha), as well as the University of Wisconsin–Extension. The idea was suggested in the 1940s and 1950s by Governors Oscar Rennebohm and Walter J. Kohler Jr.

In 1971, Lucey raised the issue again, saying a merger would contain the growing costs of two systems; give order to the increasing higher education demands of the state; control program duplication; and provide for a united voice and single UW budget. Madison faculty and administrators by and large opposed the merger, fearing it would diminish the great state university. Most WSU faculty and administrators favored the merger, believing it would add prestige to their institutions and level the playing field for state funding.

Merger legislation easily passed the Democratic-controlled Assembly. After much maneuvering and lobbying, it was approved by a one-vote margin in the Republican-controlled Senate. It took until 1974 for implementation legislation to be finalized. "I had to be pretty heavy-handed – no merger, no budget", said Lucey in an interview following his term in office.

== Other gubernatorial accomplishments ==
Lucey also recommended additional funding for tourism, which spurred development throughout the state. Two examples were the expansion of the Wisconsin Department of Natural Resources park system and the Mt. Telemark Resort in Cable, Wisconsin. Since 1974, Cable and Mt. Telemark host the American Birkebeiner each year, the largest cross-country ski race in North America. He appointed a number of task forces to address minority concerns, including the Governor's Investigating Committee on Problems of Wisconsin's Spanish Speaking Communities, which identified the lack of programs to address the Mexican American and Puerto Ricans' lack of access to education, health, housing, and work across the state. At a time when there were over 30,000 Mexican Americans living in Wisconsin, with half living in Milwaukee, less than 10 Mexican Americans were enrolled at UW-Milwaukee.

== 1980 vice presidential campaign ==
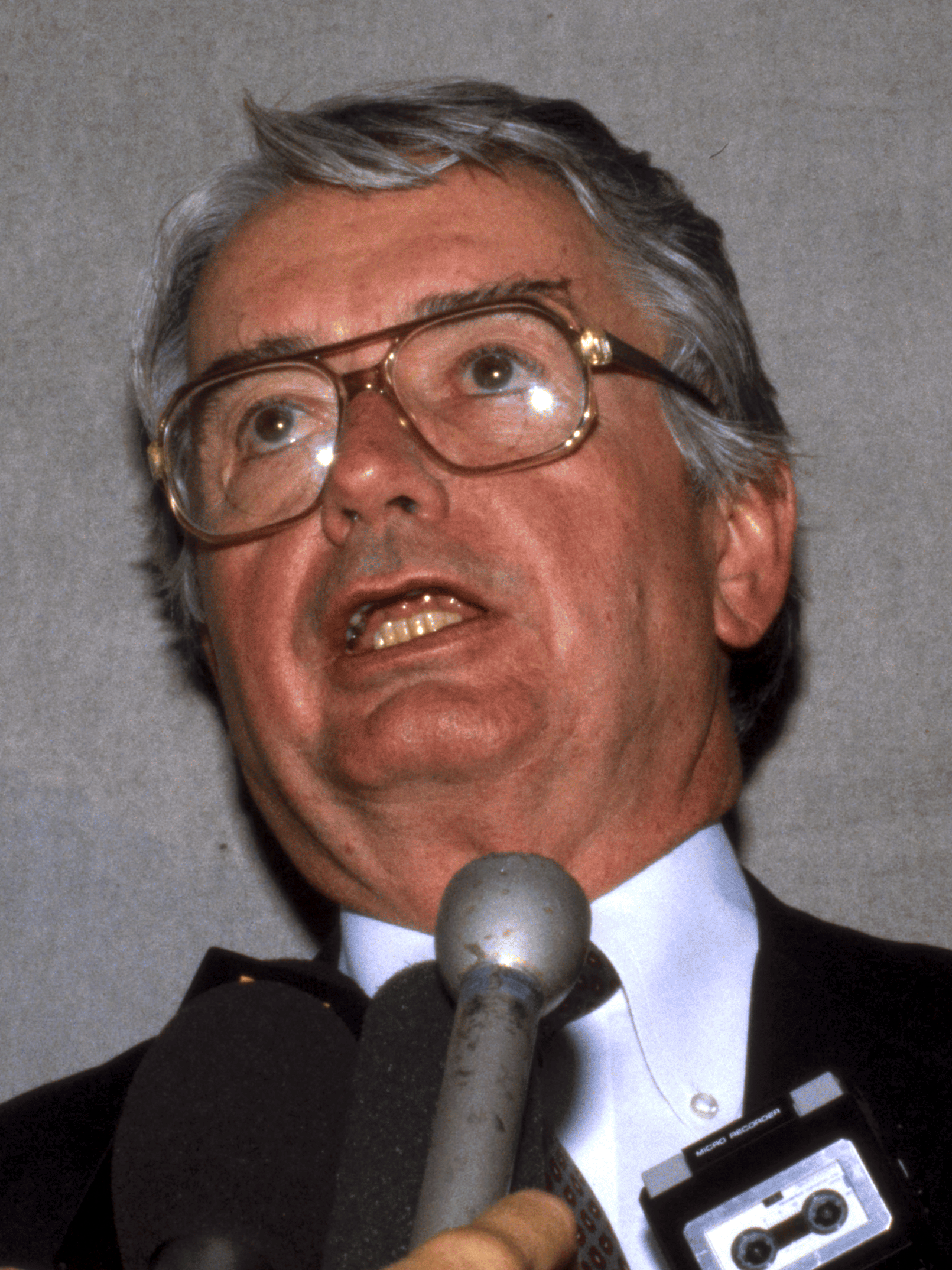
Lucey in 1980

The John Anderson–Patrick Lucey presidential ticket received 5,719,437 votes for 6.6 percent of the total vote in the 1980 presidential election, despite a 25% showing in early polls by Anderson and a spirited televised debate between Anderson and Ronald Reagan.

== 2011 Wisconsin Supreme Court election ==
In 2011, Lucey, although a Democrat, acted as David Prosser's campaign co-chairman. On March 31, 2011, he resigned from Prosser's campaign and endorsed JoAnne Kloppenburg, attributing his decision to Prosser's "disturbing distemper and lack of civility", while praising Kloppenburg for "[adhering] throughout the campaign to even-handedness and non-partisanship and [exhibiting] both promising judicial temperament and good grace, even in the heat of a fierce campaign."

== Death ==
Lucey died on May 10, 2014, in Milwaukee, Wisconsin, at the age of 96.

== Legacy ==
In September 2009, Lucey was honored with a Wisconsin Historical Society marker in Ferryville. In October 2013, Wisconsin Highway 35 between Ferryville and Prairie du Chien was renamed the "Governor Patrick Lucey Highway" in his honor. Lucey also had a biography written about his time in politics.

== Electoral history ==
=== U.S. President (1980) ===
Year	Election	Date	Elected					Defeated					Total	Plurality
1980	General	Nov. 4	Ronald Reagan; George H. W. Bush	Republican	43,903,230	50.75%	489	Jimmy Carter; Walter Mondale	Dem.	35,481,115	41.01%	49	86,509,678	8,422,115
1980	General	Nov. 4	Ronald Reagan; George H. W. Bush	Republican	43,903,230	50.75%	489	John B. Anderson; Patrick Lucey	Ind.	5,719,850	6.61%	0	86,509,678	8,422,115
1980	General	Nov. 4	Ronald Reagan; George H. W. Bush	Republican	43,903,230	50.75%	489	Ed Clark; David Koch	Lib.	921,128	1.06%	0	86,509,678	8,422,115
1980	General	Nov. 4	Ronald Reagan; George H. W. Bush	Republican	43,903,230	50.75%	489	Barry Commoner; LaDonna Harris	Cit.	233,052	0.27%	0	86,509,678	8,422,115
1980	General	Nov. 4	Ronald Reagan; George H. W. Bush	Republican	43,903,230	50.75%	489	Gus Hall; Angela Davis	Com.	44,933	0.05%	0	86,509,678	8,422,115
1980	General	Nov. 4	Ronald Reagan; George H. W. Bush	Republican	43,903,230	50.75%	489	John Rarick; Eileen Shearer	Amer.	40,906	0.05%	0	86,509,678	8,422,115
1980	General	Nov. 4	Ronald Reagan; George H. W. Bush	Republican	43,903,230	50.75%	489	Clifton DeBerry; Matilde Zimmermann	Soc.	38,738	0.04%	0	86,509,678	8,422,115
1980	General	Nov. 4	Ronald Reagan; George H. W. Bush	Republican	43,903,230	50.75%	489	Ellen McCormack; Carroll Driscoll	Life.	32,320	0.04%	0	86,509,678	8,422,115
1980	General	Nov. 4	Ronald Reagan; George H. W. Bush	Republican	43,903,230	50.75%	489	Maureen Smith; Elizabeth Cervantes Barron	Pea.	18,116	0.02%	0	86,509,678	8,422,115

Party political offices
Preceded by David Carley	Democratic nominee for Lieutenant Governor of Wisconsin; 1964	Succeeded by Martin J. Schreiber
Preceded by John Reynolds	Democratic nominee for Governor of Wisconsin; 1966	Succeeded by Bronson La Follette
Preceded by Bronson La Follette	Democratic nominee for Governor of Wisconsin; 1970, 1974	Succeeded by Martin Schreiber
Preceded by Reubin Askew	Chair of the Democratic Governors Association; 1977	Succeeded by Jim Hunt
Political offices
Preceded by Jack Olson	Lieutenant Governor of Wisconsin; 1965–1967	Succeeded by Jack Olson
Preceded by Warren Knowles	Governor of Wisconsin; 1971–1977	Succeeded by Martin Schreiber
Diplomatic posts
Preceded by Joseph Jova	United States Ambassador to Mexico; 1977–1979	Succeeded by Julian Nava
