= Warren P. Knowles =

American politician (1908–1993)

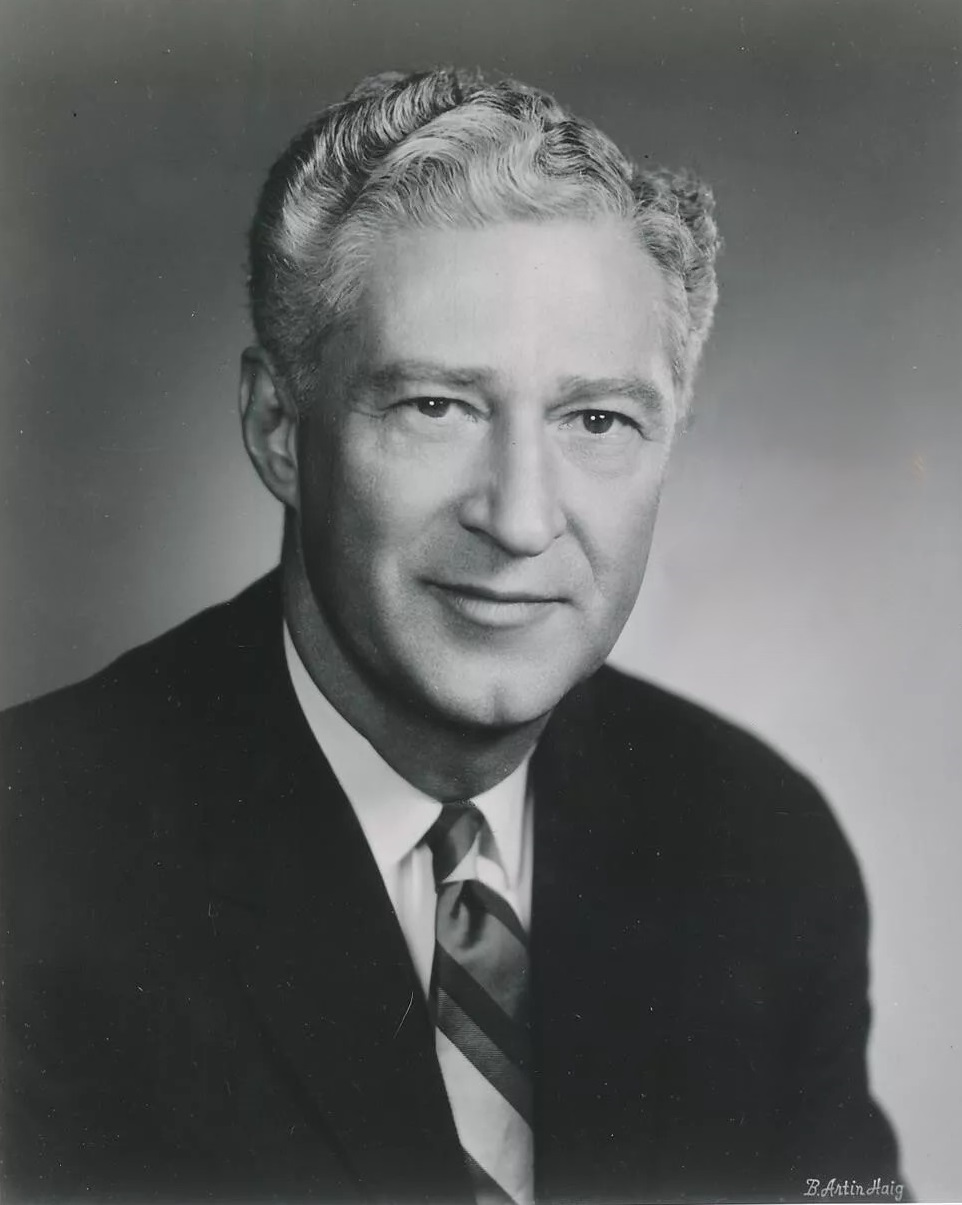

37th Governor of Wisconsin
- In office January 4, 1965 – January 4, 1971
- Lieutenant: Patrick Lucey; Jack B. Olson
- Preceded by: John W. Reynolds
- Succeeded by: Patrick Lucey

32nd and 34th Lieutenant Governor of Wisconsin
- In office January 2, 1961 – January 7, 1963
- Governor: Gaylord Nelson
- Preceded by: Philleo Nash
- Succeeded by: Jack B. Olson
- In office January 3, 1955 – January 5, 1959
- Governor: Walter Kohler Jr. Vernon Thomson
- Preceded by: George M. Smith
- Succeeded by: Philleo Nash

Member of the Wisconsin Senate from the 10th district
- In office January 1, 1941 – January 3, 1955
- Preceded by: Kenneth S. White
- Succeeded by: Robert P. Knowles

Member of the St. Croix County Board of Supervisors
- In office 1936–1940

Personal details
- Born: August 19, 1908 River Falls, Wisconsin, U.S.
- Died: May 1, 1993 (aged 84) Black River Falls, Wisconsin, U.S.
- Resting place: Greenwood Cemetery, St. Croix County, Wisconsin, U.S.
- Party: Republican
- Spouse: Dorothy Guidry (m. 1943; div. 1968)
- Relatives: Robert P. Knowles (brother)
- Education: Carleton College; University of Wisconsin Law School
- Profession: Attorney; Banker; Politician

Military service
- Allegiance: United States
- Branch/service: United States Navy
- Rank: Lieutenant
- Unit: USS Nevada (BB-36)
- Battles/wars: World War II

Warren Perley Knowles III (August 19, 1908 – May 1, 1993) was an American lawyer and politician who was the 37th governor of Wisconsin from 1965 to 1971. Prior to that, he was the 32nd and 34th lieutenant governor of Wisconsin, and represented St. Croix, Buffalo, Pepin, and Pierce Counties in the Wisconsin Senate for fourteen years.

== Early life ==
Knowles was born in River Falls, Wisconsin, graduated first from River Falls High School in 1926 and then Carleton College in Northfield, Minnesota, in 1930, and received a law degree from the University of Wisconsin Law School three years later.

== Career ==
In 1933, Knowles joined the law firm now known as Doar, Drill & Skow S.C. in New Richmond, Wisconsin. From 1935 to 1964, the firm was known as Doar & Knowles. From 1935 to 1940, he served on the St. Croix County Board of Supervisors.

Knowles was first elected to the Wisconsin State Senate in 1940, becoming Majority Leader after only two years in office in 1943, but during World War II he took a break to serve as a lieutenant in the U.S. Navy aboard the battleship USS Nevada. Following his military service, Knowles resumed serving in the Wisconsin State Senate and returned to the leadership position for 5 additional legislative terms until his election as lieutenant governor in 1954. Knowles resigned his Senate seat and was succeeded by his brother, Robert, who won an April 1955 special election to finish the unexpired senate term.

Knowles was also a delegate to the Republican National Convention several times.

Knowles would be re-elected to a second term as lieutenant governor in 1956, but was narrowly defeated in 1958 by Democrat Philleo Nash. But Knowles would return and defeat Nash in the 1960 election to reclaim the office for one more term.

During his second term as lieutenant governor, he entered the crowded field for the special election for the remainder of Sen. Joseph McCarthy's term upon his death in 1957. He placed fourth behind former Governor Walter J. Kohler Jr. and Congressmen Glenn R. Davis and Alvin O'Konski, receiving 8% of the vote.

Elected governor narrowly over the Democratic incumbent John W. Reynolds in 1964 against the national Lyndon B. Johnson tidal wave, he served three two-year terms from 1965 to 1971. During these years, he called out the National Guard periodically to maintain civil order during the University of Wisconsin's anti-war and civil rights demonstrations. Under Knowles, the Conservation Department and Department of Resource Development were merged into the Wisconsin Department of Natural Resources, vocational and higher education and traffic safety were prioritized, and state government was reorganized. Knowles opposed right-to-work legislation.

Knowles's brother, Robert P. Knowles, served as President Pro Tempore of the Wisconsin Senate during his last two terms as governor and during the first four years of Governor Patrick Lucey's administration from 1971 to 1975.

After leaving the governor's chair, Knowles became chairman of Heritage Wisconsin Corporation, a Milwaukee bank holding company.

== Personal life ==
Son of Warren P. and Anna D. Knowles, Knowles was a 1926 graduate of River Falls High School (side note Warren P. Knowles Sr., was an 1897 graduate of RFHS). During his high school days, Knowles was a standout athlete both on the football field and basketball court. During his senior year of high school, his team won the 1925 Wisconsin State Football Championship and placed second in the Wisconsin State Basketball Tournament losing to Stevens Point in the lowest scoring championship game in the State's history, 9–7. He was recognized in the River Falls Wildcat Athletic Hall of Fame with a Distinguish Citizen Award.

In 1943 he married Dorothy Guidry, whom he later divorced in 1968.

Knowles died after suffering a heart attack while participating in the Governor's Fishing Opener, an event he helped organize 25 years earlier. His body was donated to the Medical College of Wisconsin.

== Honors ==
Wisconsin's Stewardship Fund, created "to preserve valuable wildlife habitat and natural areas, protect water quality and fisheries, and expand opportunities for outdoor recreation" was renamed the Warren Knowles-Gaylord Nelson Stewardship Program in 1993. In 1994, Knowles was inducted into the Wisconsin Conservation Hall of Fame.

Party political offices
Preceded by George M. Smith	Republican nominee for Lieutenant Governor of Wisconsin; 1954, 1956, 1958, 1960	Succeeded by Jack B. Olson
Preceded by Philip Kuehn	Republican nominee for Governor of Wisconsin; 1964, 1966, 1968	Succeeded by Jack B. Olson
Political offices
Preceded by John W. Reynolds	Governor of Wisconsin; 1965-1971	Succeeded by Patrick Lucey
Preceded by George M. Smith	Lieutenant Governor of Wisconsin; 1955–1959	Succeeded by Philleo Nash
Preceded by Philleo Nash	Lieutenant Governor of Wisconsin; 1961–1963	Succeeded by Jack B. Olson
