= 1978 Wyoming state elections =

A general election was held in the U.S. state of Wyoming on Tuesday, November 7, 1978. All of the state's executive officers—the Governor, Secretary of State, Auditor, Treasurer, and Superintendent of Public Instruction—were up for election. Democratic Governor Edgar Herschler won a narrow re-election to a second term, and Democrat Lynn Simons was elected Superintendent of Public Instruction, narrowly defeating incumbent Republican Robert G. Schroder. Republicans won the remainder of the statewide offices.

== Governor ==
Incumbent Democratic Governor Edgar Herschler ran for re-election to a second term, and faced former State Senator John Ostlund, the Republican nominee, in the general election. Herschler's margin of victory narrowed considerably from 1974, but he narrowly won re-election over Ostlund.

1978 Wyoming gubernatorial election
Party	Candidate	Votes	%	±%
Democratic	Edgar Herschler (inc.)	69,972	50.86%	−5.02%
Republican	John Ostlund	67,595	49.14%	+5.02%
Majority		2,377	1.73%	−10.03%
Turnout		137,567		
Democratic hold				

== Secretary of State ==
Incumbent Republican Secretary of State Thyra Thomson ran for re-election to a fifth term. She faced Ed Sencabaugh, an executive with the Union Pacific Railroad and a former State Representative, in the Republican primary. She handily defeated him, and advanced to the general election. No Democratic candidates filed to oppose Thomson, though Robert Warburton, a college student, received 54 write-in votes and was offered the nomination. He ultimately declined it, leaving the Democrats with no candidate and Thomson with no opponent, enabling her to win re-election unopposed.

=== Republican primary ===
==== Candidates ====
- Thyra Thomson, incumbent Secretary of State
- Ed Sencabaugh, Union Pacific Railroad executive, former State Representative from Albany County

==== Results ====
Republican Primary results
Party	Candidate	Votes	%
Republican	Thyra Thomson (inc.)	46,992	68.30%
Republican	Ed Sencabaugh	21,807	31.70%
Total votes		68,799	100.00%

=== General election ===
==== Results ====
1978 Wyoming Secretary of State election
Party	Candidate	Votes	%
Republican	Thyra Thomson (inc.)	103,102	100.00%
Total votes		103,102	
Republican hold			

Results by county Thomson: 90–100%

== Auditor ==
Incumbent Republican State Auditor Jim Griffith ran for re-election to a second term. He faced no opposition in the Republican primary and no Democratic candidate initially filed against him. But Jim Polis, a bank examiner in the State Examiner's office, received enough write-in votes to receive his party's nomination, which he accepted. However, Polis did not present significant challenge to Griffith, who won re-election by a lopsided margin.

=== Democratic primary ===
No Democratic candidates filed for State Auditor. However, Jim Polis, a bank examiner at the State Examiner's office, received 329 write-in votes and was offered the nomination, which he accepted.

=== Republican primary ===
==== Candidates ====
- Jim Griffith, incumbent State Auditor

==== Results ====
Republican Primary results
Party	Candidate	Votes	%
Republican	Jim Griffith (inc.)	60,947	100.00%
Total votes		60,947	100.00%

=== General election ===
==== Results ====
1978 Wyoming Auditor election
Party	Candidate	Votes	%	±%
Republican	Jim Griffith (inc.)	88,190	68.96%	+12.06%
Democratic	Jim Polis	39,704	31.04%	−12.06%
Majority		48,486	37.91%	+24.13%
Turnout		127,894		
Republican hold				

Results by county Griffith: 50–60%; 60–70%; 70–80%; 80–90%

== Treasurer ==
Incumbent Republican State Treasurer Ed Witzenburger was unable to seek re-election due to term limits and instead opted to run for Congress, ultimately losing to Dick Cheney in the Republican primary. In the Republican primary, Deputy Treasurer Shirley Wittler won a narrow victory over Craig L. Thomas. In the general election, she faced former State Representative Bob Adams, a perennial candidate for statewide office. She defeated Adams in a landslide, becoming only the second woman, after Minnie A. Mitchell, to serve as State Treasurer.

=== Democratic primary ===
==== Candidates ====
- Bob Adams, former State Representative, former State Representative from Laramie County, 1974 Democratic nominee for Auditor, 1970 Democratic candidate for Treasurer, 1966 Democratic nominee for Treasurer, 1962 Democratic nominee for Treasurer, 1958 Democratic nominee for State Auditor, 1954 Democratic nominee for State Auditor
- Ed Dover, salesman

==== Results ====
Democratic Party primary results
Party	Candidate	Votes	%
Democratic	Bob Adams	25,970	66.70%
Democratic	Ed Dover	12,965	33.30%
Total votes		38,935	100.00%

=== Republican primary ===
==== Candidates ====
- Shirley Wittler, Deputy State Treasurer
- Craig L. Thomas, general manager of the Wyoming Rural Electric Association

==== Results ====
Republican Primary results
Party	Candidate	Votes	%
Republican	Shirley Wittler	33,255	51.86%
Republican	Craig L. Thomas	30,865	48.14%
Total votes		64,120	100.00%

=== General election ===
==== Results ====
1978 Wyoming Treasurer election
Party	Candidate	Votes	%	±%
Republican	Shirley Wittler	80,273	62.39%	+10.65%
Democratic	Bob Adams	48,394	37.61%	−10.65%
Majority		31,879	24.78%	+21.31%
Turnout		128,667	100.00%	
Republican hold				

Results by county Wittler: 50–60%; 60–70%; 70–80%; Adams: 50–60%

== Superintendent of Public Instruction ==
Incumbent Republican Superintendent of Public Instruction Robert G. Schrader ran for re-election to a third term. He faced a strong challenge in the Republican primary from Converse County Superintendent of Schools Millard I. Meredith. Though Schrader defeated Meredith, he did so by a relatively close margin. In the Democratic primary, meanwhile, Lynn Simons, the former Chairwoman of the Wyoming Board of Education, defeated Sydney Spiegel, a history teacher who ran as the 1974 Democratic nominee for Superintendent. Simons ultimately defeated Schrader by a slim margin, receiving the highest percentage of vote of any statewide Democratic candidate.

=== Democratic primary ===
==== Candidates ====
- Lynn Simons, former Chairwoman of the State Board of Education
- Sydney Spiegel, Cheyenne history teacher, 1974 Democratic nominee for Superintendent

==== Results ====
Democratic Party primary results
Party	Candidate	Votes	%
Democratic	Lynn Simons	25,253	64.86%
Democratic	Sydney Spiegel	14,111	36.24%
Total votes		39,364	100.00%

=== Republican primary ===
==== Candidates ====
- Robert G. Schrader, incumbent State Superintendent of Public Instruction
- Millard I. Meredith, Converse County Superintendent of Schools

==== Results ====
Republican Party primary results
Party	Candidate	Votes	%
Republican	Robert G. Schrader (inc.)	37,377	57.54%
Republican	Millard I. Meredith	27,580	42.46%
Total votes		64,957	100.00%

=== General election ===
==== Results ====
1978 Wyoming Superintendent of Public Instruction election
Party	Candidate	Votes	%	±%
Democratic	Lynn Simons	69,251	52.70%	+14.66%
Republican	Robert G. Schrader (inc.)	62,165	47.30%	−14.66%
Majority		7,096	5.40%	−18.51%
Turnout		131,426	100.00%	
Democratic gain from Republican				

Results by county Simons: 50–60%; 60–70%; Schrader: 50–60%; 60–70%
