= 1986 Wyoming state elections =

A general election was held in the U.S. state of Wyoming on Tuesday, November 4, 1986. All of the state's executive officers—the Governor, Secretary of State, Auditor, Treasurer, and Superintendent of Public Instruction—were up for election. Democrats performed well in the year's elections; Democratic nominee Mike Sullivan won the gubernatorial election by a decisive margin, Superintendent Lynn Simons won a sizable majority in her bid for a third term, and Kathy Karpan won the open Secretary of State's race. Republicans prevailed in elections for State Auditor and Treasurer, as well as in the US House seat.

== Governor ==
Incumbent Democratic Governor Edgar Herschler declined to run for re-election to a fourth term, and attorney Mike Sullivan won the Democratic primary to succeed him. He faced former State Representative Pete Simpson in the general election, whom he defeated by a decisive margin.

1986 Wyoming gubernatorial election
Party	Candidate	Votes	%	±%
Democratic	Mike Sullivan	88,879	53.96%	−9.18%
Republican	Pete Simpson	75,841	46.04%	+9.18%
Majority		13,038	7.92%	−18.37%
Turnout		164,720		
Democratic hold				

== Secretary of State ==
Incumbent Republican Secretary of State Thyra Thomson declined to run for re-election to a seventh term. Her son, K. C. Thomson, a Sheridan banker, ran in the Republican primary to succeed her, as did State Senate President Jerry Geis. The contest between the two was extremely close, with unofficial results showing Thomson with a 61-vote lead over Geis. The recount confirmed Thomson's narrow victory over Geis, and he advanced to the general election, where he faced Kathy Karpan, the former Director of the Wyoming Department of Health and Social Services in Governor Edgar Herschler's cabinet. Karpan ended up narrowly defeating Thomson, the first Democratic victory in a Secretary of State's race since 1958.

=== Democratic primary ===
==== Candidates ====
- Kathy Karpan, former Director of the Wyoming Department of Health and Social Services

==== Results ====
Democratic Party primary results
Party	Candidate	Votes	%
Democratic	Kathy Karpan	38,201	100.0%
Total votes		38,201	100.00%

=== Republican primary ===
==== Candidates ====
- K. C. Thomson, Sheridan banker, son of incumbent State Treasurer Thyra Thomson
- Jerry Geis, President of the Wyoming Senate

==== Results ====
Republican Primary results
Party	Candidate	Votes	%
Republican	K. C. Thomson	44,868	50.03%
Republican	Jerry Geis	44,807	100.00%
Total votes		89,675	100.00%

=== General election ===
==== Results ====
1986 Wyoming Secretary of State election
Party	Candidate	Votes	%	±%
Democratic	Kathy Karpan	86,449	53.59%	+7.29%
Republican	K. C. Thomson	74,880	46.41%	−7.29%
Majority		11,569	7.17%	−0.24%
Turnout		161,329	100.00%	
Democratic gain from Republican				

Results by county Karpan: 50–60%; 60–70%; Thomson: 50–60%; 60–70%

== Auditor ==
Incumbent Republican State Auditor Jim Griffith declined to seek re-election to a fourth term. State House Speaker Jack Sidi won the Republican nomination unopposed, and faced Bil Tucker, a technical manager and a former trustee on the Albany County School Board, in the general election. Sidi ultimately defeated Tucker by a decisive margin, though considerably reduced from Griffith's 1982 landslide.

=== Democratic primary ===
==== Candidates ====
- Bil Tucker, former Trustee on the Albany County School Board

==== Results ====
Democratic primary results
Party	Candidate	Votes	%
Democratic	Bil Tucker	36,254	100.00%
Total votes		36,254	100.00%

=== Republican primary ===
==== Candidates ====
- Jack Sidi, Speaker of the Wyoming House of Representatives

==== Results ====
Republican primary results
Party	Candidate	Votes	%
Republican	Jack Sidi	78,168	100.00%
Total votes		78,168	100.00%

=== General election ===
==== Results ====
1986 Wyoming Auditor election
Party	Candidate	Votes	%	±%
Republican	Jack Sidi	86,384	55.30%	−18.31%
Democratic	Bil Tucker	69,819	44.70%	+18.31%
Majority		16,565	10.60%	−36.62%
Turnout		156,203		
Republican hold				

Results by county Sidi: 50–60%; 60–70%; 70–80%; Tucker: 50–60%; 60–70%

== Treasurer ==
In 1982, Wyoming voters approved a constitutional amendment that allowed state treasurers to seek re-election, making incumbent Republican State Treasurer Stan Smith the first treasurer in state history to be eligible for re-election to a second term. Though Smith initially announced that he would run for governor, he ended his campaign and sought re-election as Treasurer. He faced a challenge in the Republican primary from Lee Galeotos, a former official in Governor Stanley Hathaway's administration, who announced that he would run for State Treasurer while Smith was running for governor. When Smith ran for re-election instead, Galeotos remained in the race. Smith defeated Galeotos by a wide margin, and faced former State Representative Carrol P. Orrison, the Democratic nominee, in the general election.

=== Democratic primary ===
==== Candidates ====
- Carrol P. Orrison, former State Representative from Laramie County

==== Results ====
Democratic Party primary results
Party	Candidate	Votes	%
Democratic	Carrol P. Orrison	36,080	100.00%
Total votes		36,080	100.00%

=== Republican primary ===
==== Candidates ====
- Stan Smith, incumbent State Treasurer
- Sam Galeotos, former State Director of Administrative and Fiscal Control

==== Results ====
Republican Primary results
Party	Candidate	Votes	%
Republican	Stan Smith (inc.)	60,411	68.15%
Republican	Sam Galeotos	28,233	31.85%
Total votes		88,644	100.00%

=== General election ===
==== Results ====
1986 Wyoming Treasurer election
Party	Candidate	Votes	%	±%
Republican	Stan Smith (inc.)	98,502	61.81%	+3.25%
Democratic	Carrol P. Orrison	60,870	38.19%	−3.25%
Majority		37,632	23.61%	+6.49%
Turnout		159,372	100.00%	
Republican hold				

Results by county Smith: 50–60%; 60–70%; 70–80%; Orrison: 50–60%

== Superintendent of Public Instruction ==
Incumbent Democratic Superintendent of Public Instruction Lynn Simons ran for re-election to a third term. She faced Millard I. Meredith, the Superintendent of the Converse County School District No. 1 and the Republican nominee, in the general election. Simons defeated Meredith by a sizable margin, largely replicating her victory from 1986.

=== Democratic primary ===
==== Candidates ====
- Lynn Simons, incumbent Superintendent of Public Instruction

==== Results ====
Democratic Party primary results
Party	Candidate	Votes	%
Democratic	Lynn Simons (inc.)	39,172	100.00%
Total votes		39,172	100.00%

=== Republican primary ===
==== Candidates ====
- Millard I. Meredith, Superintendent of the Converse County School District No. 1, 1978 Republican candidate for Superintendent of Public Instruction

==== Results ====
Republican Party primary results
Party	Candidate	Votes	%
Republican	Millard I. Meredith	77,107	100.00%
Total votes		77,107	100.00%

=== General election ===
==== Results ====
1986 Wyoming Superintendent of Public Instruction election
Party	Candidate	Votes	%	±%
Democratic	Lynn Simons (inc.)	90,978	56.88%	−0.08%
Republican	Millard I. Meredith	68,960	43.12%	+0.08%
Majority		22,018	13.77%	−0.17%
Turnout		159,938	100.00%	
Democratic hold				

Results by county Simons: 50–60%; 60–70%; 70–80%; Meredith: 50–60%; 60–70%
