= 1974 Wyoming state elections =

A general election was held in the U.S. state of Wyoming on Tuesday, November 5, 1974. All of the state's executive officers—the Governor, Secretary of State, Auditor, Treasurer, and Superintendent of Public Instruction—were up for election. Democratic gubernatorial nominee Edgar Herschler won a sizable victory in the gubernatorial election, and while Democrats generally improved their margins in the other statewide races, they fell short in all four.

== Governor ==
Incumbent Republican Governor Stanley Hathaway opted to retire rather than run for a third consecutive term. Former State Senator Dick Jones won a close Republican primary to succeed him, and faced former State Representative Edgar Herschler, the Democratic nominee, in the general election. Despite the growing Republican dominance in Wyoming, Herschler took advantage of the national Democratic wave and defeated Jones by a sizable margin, becoming the first Democrat to win a gubernatorial election in the state since 1958.

1974 Wyoming gubernatorial election
Party	Candidate	Votes	%	±%
Democratic	Edgar Herschler	71,741	55.88%	+18.67%
Republican	Dick Jones	56,645	44.12%	−18.67%
Majority		15,096	11.76%	−13.81%
Turnout		128,386		
Democratic gain from Republican				

== Secretary of State ==
Incumbent Republican Secretary of State Thyra Thomson ran for re-election to a fourth term. In the Democratic primary, attorney Charles Carroll, a new arrival to the state, beat out Paul Crane, the son of former Governor Arthur G. Crane. However, despite the national Democratic wave and Edgar Herschler's large victory, Thomson's personal popularity allowed her to defeat Carroll in a landslide.

=== Democratic primary ===
==== Candidates ====
- Charles Carroll, attorney
- Paul Crane, son of former Governor Arthur G. Crane

==== Results ====
Democratic Party primary results
Party	Candidate	Votes	%
Democratic	Charles Carroll	21,629	59.80%
Democratic	Paul Crane	14,541	40.20%
Total votes		36,170	100.00%

=== Republican primary ===
==== Candidates ====
- Thyra Thomson, incumbent Secretary of State

==== Results ====
Republican Primary results
Party	Candidate	Votes	%
Republican	Thyra Thomson (inc.)	53,300	100.00%
Total votes		53,300	100.00%

=== General election ===
==== Results ====
1974 Wyoming Secretary of State election
Party	Candidate	Votes	%	±%
Republican	Thyra Thomson (inc.)	7,716	62.23%	−2.99%
Democratic	Charles Carroll	47,098	37.77%	+2.99%
Majority		30,517	24.47%	−5.97%
Turnout		124,713		
Republican hold				

Results by county Thomson: 50–60%; 60–70%; 70–80%; Carroll: 50–60%

== Auditor ==
Everett T. Copenhaver resigned as State Auditor on June 30, 1973, and Governor Stanley Hathaway appointed Deputy State Treasurer Ed Witzenburger as his replacement. Though Witzenburger would have been eligible to seek re-election to a full term as Auditor, he came to an agreement with State Treasurer Jim Griffith, who was barred from seeking a second consecutive term, to instead run for Treasurer so Griffith could run for Auditor. Griffith won the Republican primary unopposed, and no Democrats initially filed to run against him. However, former State Representative Bob Adams, despite losing the primary for State Treasurer, received 59 write-in votes in the Democratic primary, was offered the nomination, and ended up accepting it. Griffith ultimately defeated Adams by a wide margin, winning his first of three terms as State Auditor.

=== Democratic primary ===
No Democratic candidates filed for State Auditor. However, former State Representative Bob Adams received 59 votes as a write-in in the Democratic primary, despite not campaigning, and was offered the nomination. Richard Ford Pew, an oil fortune scion who served as George McGovern's Wyoming state coordinator for his 1972 presidential campaign, received 55 votes and Adams said that he would step aside if Pew wanted the nomination. However, Pew declined the nomination and Adams ultimately accepted it.

=== Republican primary ===
==== Candidates ====
- Jim Griffith, Wyoming State Treasurer

==== Results ====
Republican Primary results
Party	Candidate	Votes	%
Republican	Jim Griffith	51,197	100.00%
Total votes		51,197	100.00%

=== General election ===
==== Results ====
1974 Wyoming Auditor election
Party	Candidate	Votes	%	±%
Republican	Jim Griffith	68,798	56.89%	−0.60%
Democratic	Bob Adams	52,128	43.11%	+0.60%
Majority		16,670	13.79%	−1.19%
Turnout		120,926		
Republican hold				

Results by county Griffith: 50–60%; 60–70%; 70–80%; Adams: 50–60%; 60–70%

== Treasurer ==
Incumbent Republican State Treasurer Jim Griffith was unable to seek re-election to a second term because of a constitutional bar on state treasurers succeeding themselves, so he came to an agreement with appointed State Auditor Ed Witzenburger in which Griffith ran for Auditor and Witzenburger ran for Treasurer. Witzenburger won the Republican primary unopposed and faced former State Representative Elizabeth Phelan, who had previously sought the Democratic nomination for Treasurer in 1970, in the general election. Witzenburger fell significantly short of Griffith's strong performance in the election four years prior, and ended up barely defeating Phelan, winning by a little more than 4,000 votes.

=== Democratic primary ===
==== Candidates ====
- Elizabeth Phelan, former State Representative, 1970 Democratic candidate for Treasurer
- Bob Adams, former State Representative, former State Representative from Laramie County, 1970 Democratic candidate for Treasurer, 1966 Democratic nominee for Treasurer, 1962 Democratic nominee for Treasurer, 1958 Democratic nominee for State Auditor, 1954 Democratic nominee for State Auditor

==== Results ====
Democratic Party primary results
Party	Candidate	Votes	%
Democratic	Elizabeth Phelan	22,742	55.77%
Democratic	Bob Adams	18,039	44.23%
Total votes		40,781	100.00%

=== Republican primary ===
==== Candidates ====
- Ed Witzenburger, Wyoming State Auditor

==== Results ====
Republican Primary results
Party	Candidate	Votes	%
Republican	Ed Witzenburger	48,757	100.00%
Total votes		48,757	100.00%

=== General election ===
==== Results ====
1974 Wyoming Treasurer election
Party	Candidate	Votes	%	±%
Republican	Ed Witzenburger	63,734	51.73%	−5.88%
Democratic	Elizabeth Phelan	59,463	48.27%	+5.88%
Majority		4,271	3.47%	−11.76%
Turnout		123,197	100.00%	
Republican hold				

Results by county Witzenburger: 50–60%; 60–70%; 70–80%; Phelan: 50–60%; 70–80%

== Superintendent of Public Instruction ==
Incumbent Republican Superintendent of Public Instruction Robert G. Schrader ran for re-election to a second term. Two Democrats filed to oppose him: former teacher Sydney Spiegel and John Seyfang, the Superintendent of Schools in the city of Worland. Spiegel narrowly defeated Seyfang in the primary and advanced to the general election against Schrader. Even though most statewide races tightened as the outlook improved for Democratic candidates, Seyfang improved on his margin of victory from four years prior, defeating Spiegel in a landslide.

=== Democratic primary ===
==== Candidates ====
- Sydney Spiegel, former Cheyenne teacher
- John Seyfang, Worland Superintendent of Schools

==== Results ====
Democratic Party primary results
Party	Candidate	Votes	%
Democratic	Sydney Spiegel	19,731	54.21%
Democratic	John Seyfang	16,666	45.79%
Total votes		36,396	100.00%

=== Republican primary ===
==== Candidates ====
- Robert G. Schrader, incumbent State Superintendent of Public Instruction

==== Results ====
Republican Party primary results
Party	Candidate	Votes	%
Republican	Robert G. Schrader (inc.)	49,334	100.00%
Total votes		49,334	100.00%

=== General election ===
==== Results ====
1974 Wyoming Superintendent of Public Instruction election
Party	Candidate	Votes	%	±%
Republican	Robert G. Schrader (inc.)	75,208	61.96%	+4.35%
Democratic	Sydney Spiegel	46,181	38.04%	−4.35%
Majority		29,027	23.91%	+8.70%
Turnout		121,389	100.00%	
Republican hold				

Results by county Schrader: 50–60%; 60–70%; 70–80%; 80–90%; Spiegel: 60–70%
