= 1970 Wyoming state elections =

A general election was held in the U.S. state of Wyoming on Tuesday, November 3, 1970. All of the state's executive officers—the Governor, Secretary of State, Auditor, Treasurer, and Superintendent of Public Instruction—were up for election. Continuing their success from 1962 and 1966, Republicans won all of the statewide executive offices once again, and all of them by large margins.

== Governor ==
Incumbent Republican Governor Stanley Hathaway ran for re-election to a second term. He was opposed by State Representative John J. Rooney, the Democratic nominee. Hathaway defeated Rooney in a landslide.

1970 Wyoming gubernatorial election
Party	Candidate	Votes	%	±%
Republican	Stanley Hathaway (inc.)	74,249	62.79%	+8.49%
Democratic	John J. Rooney	44,008	37.21%	−8.49%
Majority		30,241	25.57%	+16.99%
Turnout		118,257		
Republican hold				

== Secretary of State ==
Incumbent Republican Secretary of State Thyra Thomson ran for re-election to a third term. After facing marginal opposition in the Republican primary, Thomson faced former State Representative Howard L. Burke, the Democratic nominee, in the general election. Continuing her streak of winning large majorities, Thomson defeated Burke in a landslide to win re-election.

=== Democratic primary ===
==== Candidates ====
- Howard L. Burke, former State Representative from Laramie County, 1966 Democratic candidate for Governor

==== Results ====
Democratic Party primary results
Party	Candidate	Votes	%
Democratic	Howard L. Burke	31,812	100.00%
Total votes		31,812	100.00%

=== Republican primary ===
==== Candidates ====
- Thyra Thomson, incumbent Secretary of State
- Bob Craver

==== Results ====
Republican Primary results
Party	Candidate	Votes	%
Republican	Thyra Thomson (inc.)	38,410	82.79%
Republican	Bob Craver	7,987	17.21%
Total votes		46,397	100.00%

=== General election ===
==== Results ====
1970 Wyoming Secretary of State election
Party	Candidate	Votes	%	±%
Republican	Thyra Thomson (inc.)	75,905	65.22%	+0.92%
Democratic	Howard L. Burke	40,475	34.78%	−0.92%
Majority		35,430	30.44%	+1.84%
Turnout		116,380		
Republican hold				

== Auditor ==
Incumbent Republican State Auditor Everett T. Copenhaver ran for re-election to a second consecutive term, his fourth term as State Auditor overall. The Democratic Party did not embark on a major recruitment effort for the race, and the primary election boiled down to Mike Vinich, who served as the executive director of the state employment security commission, rancher David Laird, and businessman Frank Woodhouse. The primary election was close, with Vinich holding a several-hundred vote lead over Laird as the votes were tallied. However, Laird declined to seek a recount and conceded to Vinich, who advanced to the general election against Copenhaver. The general election was much less close, and Copenhaver handily defeated Vinich to win re-election.

=== Democratic primary ===
==== Candidates ====
- Mike Vinich, former Executive Director of the Wyoming Employment Security Commission
- David G. Laird, Worland rancher
- Frank Woodhouse, Cheyenne businessman

==== Results ====
Democratic Party primary results
Party	Candidate	Votes	%
Democratic	Mike Vinich	12,522	35.05%
Democratic	David G. Laird	12,482	34.94%
Democratic	Frank Woodhouse	10,722	30.01%
Total votes		35,726	100.00%

=== Republican primary ===
==== Candidates ====
- Everett T. Copenhaver, incumbent State Auditor

==== Results ====
Republican Primary results
Party	Candidate	Votes	%
Republican	Everett T. Copenhaver (inc.)	42,235	100.00%
Total votes		42,235	100.00%

=== General election ===
==== Results ====
1970 Wyoming Auditor election
Party	Candidate	Votes	%	±%
Republican	Everett T. Copenhaver (inc.)	65,664	57.49%	−0.54%
Democratic	Mike Vinich	48,555	42.51%	+0.54%
Majority		17,109	14.98%	−1.09%
Turnout		114,219		
Republican hold				

== Treasurer ==
Incumbent Republican State Treasurer Minnie A. Mitchell was unable to seek re-election to a second consecutive term, creating an open seat. Newspaper publisher Jim Griffith won the Republican primary over Cheyenne Mayor Floyd Holland, and he proceeded to the general election, where he was opposed by Democratic nominee Bob Adams, a former State Representative who had repeatedly run as the Democratic nominee for Auditor or Treasurer for several decades. Griffith ultimately defeated Adams by a wide margin.

=== Democratic primary ===
==== Candidates ====
- Bob Adams, former State Representative, former State Representative from Laramie County, 1966 Democratic nominee for Treasurer, 1962 Democratic nominee for Treasurer, 1958 Democratic nominee for State Auditor, 1954 Democratic nominee for State Auditor
- Elizabeth Phelan, State Representative from Laramie County

==== Results ====
Democratic Party primary results
Party	Candidate	Votes	%
Democratic	Bob Adams	19,161	50.70%
Democratic	Elizabeth Phelan	18,629	49.30%
Total votes		37,790	100.00%

=== Republican primary ===
==== Candidates ====
- Jim Griffith, publisher of the Lusk Herald
- Floyd Holland, Mayor of Cheyenne

==== Results ====
Republican Primary results
Party	Candidate	Votes	%
Republican	Jim Griffith	23,679	54.57%
Republican	Floyd Holland	19,709	45.43%
Total votes		43,388	100.00%

=== General election ===
==== Results ====
1970 Wyoming Treasurer election
Party	Candidate	Votes	%	±%
Republican	Jim Griffith	65,161	57.61%	+0.66%
Democratic	Bob Adams	47,942	42.39%	−0.66%
Majority		17,219	15.22%	+1.32%
Turnout		113,103	100.00%	
Republican hold				

== Superintendent of Public Instruction ==
Incumbent Republican Superintendent of Public Instruction Harry Roberts declined to seek a second term, instead opting to run forCongress rather than seek re-election. Robert G. Schrader, the superintendent of schools in the city of Cody, won a crowded Republican primary to succeed Roberts. He faced Democratic nominee Patrick J. Moran, the Superintendent of the Johnson County School District No. 1, in the general election. Schrader defeated Moran by a wide margin, significantly improving from Roberts's 1966.

=== Democratic primary ===
==== Candidates ====
- Patrick J. Moran, Superintendent of the Johnson County School District No. 1

==== Results ====
Democratic Party primary results
Party	Candidate	Votes	%
Democratic	Patrick J. Moran	31,766	100.00%
Total votes		31,766	100.00%

=== Republican primary ===
==== Candidates ====
- Robert G. Schrader, Superintendent of Cody Schools
- Jim Durkee, University of Wyoming vocational education professor
- Richard Langdon, Superintendent of Goshen Hole schools
- Ned N. Tranal, Sheridan psychologist

==== Results ====
Republican Party primary results
Party	Candidate	Votes	%
Republican	Robert G. Schrader	15,912	36.61%
Republican	Jim Durkee	12,777	29.40%
Republican	Richard Langdon	7,651	17.60%
Republican	Ned N. Tranal	7,121	16.38%
Total votes		43,461	100.00%

=== General election ===
==== Results ====
1970 Wyoming Superintendent of Public Instruction election
Party	Candidate	Votes	%	±%
Republican	Robert G. Schrader	64,699	57.61%	+5.10%
Democratic	Patrick J. Moran	47,610	42.39%	−5.10%
Majority		17,089	15.22%	+10.21%
Turnout		112,309	100.00%	
Republican hold				
