= 1982 Wyoming state elections =

A general election was held in the U.S. state of Wyoming on Tuesday, November 2, 1982. All of the state's executive officers—the governor, secretary of state, auditor, treasurer, and superintendent of public instruction—were up for election. Democratic governor Edgar Herschler won a landslide victory on his way to a record third term in office, and Democrat Lynn Simons, first elected in 1978 as superintendent of public instruction, won a sizable re-election as well. Republicans held the other statewide offices, and the Senate and House seats.

== Governor ==
Incumbent Democratic governor Edgar Herschler ran for re-election to a third term. He faced former state house speaker Warren A. Morton in the general election, and defeated him in a landslide to win a third term, the first governor of the state to do so.

1982 Wyoming gubernatorial election
Party	Candidate	Votes	%	±%
Democratic	Edgar Herschler (inc.)	106,427	63.14%	+12.28%
Republican	Warren A. Morton	62,128	36.86%	−12.28%
Majority		44,299	26.28%	+24.55%
Turnout		168,555		
Democratic hold				

== Secretary of state ==
Incumbent Republican secretary of State Thyra Thomson ran for re-election to a sixth term. Unopposed in the Republican primary, she faced rancher Leslie Peterson, the Democratic nominee, in the general election. Peterson ran a stronger campaign than any of Thomson's past opponents, and though Thomson ultimately won re-election, she did so by her slimmest margin.

=== Democratic primary ===
==== Candidates ====
- Leslie Peterson, Jackson rancher

==== Results ====
Democratic Party primary results
Party	Candidate	Votes	%
Democratic	Leslie Peterson	44,677	100.0%
Total votes		44,677	100.00%

=== Republican primary ===
==== Candidates ====
- Thyra Thomson, incumbent secretary of state

==== Results ====
Republican Primary results
Party	Candidate	Votes	%
Republican	Thyra Thomson (inc.)	68,064	100.00%
Total votes		68,064	100.00%

=== General election ===
==== Results ====
1982 Wyoming Secretary of State election
Party	Candidate	Votes	%	±%
Republican	Thyra Thomson (inc.)	88,808	53.70%	−46.30%
Democratic	Leslie Peterson	76,559	46.30%	—
Majority		12,249	7.41%	−92.59%
Turnout		165,367	100.00%	
Republican hold				

Results by county Thomson: 50–60%; 60–70%; Peterson: 50–60%; 60–70%

== Auditor ==
Incumbent Republican State Auditor Jim Griffith ran for re-election to a third term. He won the Republican primary unopposed and was initially set to face no opposition in the general election, as no Democratic candidate filed to oppose him. However, Sid Kornegay, a Democrat who ran for Congress in 1980, announced on the day of the primary that he would seek the Democratic Party's nomination as a write-in candidate. After Kornegay received 11 write-in votes in the Democratic primary, he was offered the nomination, which he accepted. Griffith, who was not seen as vulnerable by the Democratic Party, ended up defeating Kornegay in a landslide, winning 74% of the vote to Kornegay's 26%.

=== Democratic primary ===
No Democratic candidates filed for State Auditor. However, Kornegay, a Democratic candidate for Congress in 1980 received 11 write-in votes and was offered the nomination, which he accepted.

=== Republican primary ===
==== Candidates ====
- Jim Griffith, incumbent State Auditor

==== Results ====
Republican Primary results
Party	Candidate	Votes	%
Republican	Jim Griffith (inc.)	68,206	100.00%
Total votes		68,206	100.00%

=== General election ===
==== Results ====
1982 Wyoming Auditor election
Party	Candidate	Votes	%	±%
Republican	Jim Griffith (inc.)	116,251	73.61%	+4.66%
Democratic	Sid Kornegay	41,672	26.39%	−4.66%
Majority		74,579	47.22%	+9.31%
Turnout		157,923		
Republican hold				

Results by county Griffith: 50–60%; 60–70%; 70–80%; 80–90%

== Treasurer ==
Incumbent Republican state treasurer Shirley Wittler was unable to seek re-election to a second term due to term limits. Craig L. Thomas, who unsuccessfully ran in the 1978 Republican primary, announced that he would run again, and received Wittler's endorsement. He faced former state representative Stan Smith in the primary, and Smith narrowly defeated him—and by an even narrower margin than Wittler did four years earlier. In the general election, Smith was opposed by Carbon County Treasurer C. R. "Dick" Engstrom. Though Engstrom improved on Democrats' performance from 1978, he still lost to Smith by a sizable margin.

=== Democratic primary ===
==== Candidates ====
- C. R. "Dick" Engstrom, Carbon County Treasurer

==== Results ====
Democratic Party primary results
Party	Candidate	Votes	%
Democratic	C. R. "Dick" Engstrom	25,970	66.70%
Total votes		38,935	100.00%

=== Republican primary ===
==== Candidates ====
- Stan Smith, former state representative from Hot Springs
- Craig L. Thomas, general manager of the Wyoming Rural Electric Association

==== Results ====
Republican Primary results
Party	Candidate	Votes	%
Republican	Stan Smith	36,710	51.48%
Republican	Craig L. Thomas	34,597	48.52%
Total votes		71,307	100.00%

=== General election ===
==== Results ====
1982 Wyoming Treasurer election
Party	Candidate	Votes	%	±%
Republican	Stan Smith	92,743	58.56%	−3.83%
Democratic	C. R. "Dick" Engstrom	65,631	41.44%	+3.83%
Majority		27,112	17.12%	−7.66%
Turnout		158,374	100.00%	
Republican hold				

Results by county Smith: 50–60%; 60–70%; 70–80%; Engstrom: 50–60%; 70–80%

== Superintendent of public instruction ==
Incumbent Democratic superintendent of public instruction Lynn Simons ran for re-election to a second term. She was opposed in the general election by Republican nominee Gary Elliott, a former member of the Teton County School Board. Simons ultimately defeated Elliott by a significant margin.

=== Democratic primary ===
==== Candidates ====
- Lynn Simons, incumbent superintendent of public instruction

==== Results ====
Democratic Party primary results
Party	Candidate	Votes	%
Democratic	Lynn Simons (inc.)	44,817	100.00%
Total votes		44,817	100.00%

=== Republican primary ===
==== Candidates ====
- Gary W. Elliott, former Teton County School Board member

==== Results ====
Republican Party primary results
Party	Candidate	Votes	%
Republican	Gary W. Elliott	63,852	100.00%
Total votes		63,852	100.00%

=== General election ===
==== Results ====
1982 Wyoming Superintendent of Public Instruction election
Party	Candidate	Votes	%	±%
Democratic	Lynn Simons (inc.)	92,270	56.97%	+4.27%
Republican	Gary W. Elliott	69,699	43.03%	−4.27%
Majority		22,571	13.94%	+8.54%
Turnout		161,969	100.00%	
Democratic hold				

Results by county Simons: 50–60%; 60–70%; Elliott: 50–60%; 60–70%
