= 1990 Wyoming state elections =

A general election was held in the U.S. state of Wyoming on Tuesday, November 6, 1990. All of the state's executive officers—the Governor, Secretary of State, Auditor, Treasurer, and Superintendent of Public Instruction—were up for election. Democrats Mike Sullivan and Kathy Karpan were re-elected as Governor and Secretary of State by landslide margins, while Democrat Lynn Simons was defeated for re-election by Republican Diana Ohman. Republicans also continued their winning streak in the elections for State Auditor and State Treasurer.

Additionally, the Class II US Senate seat and the state's at-large seat in the US House of Representatives were up as well, and Republicans won both.

== Governor ==
Incumbent Democratic Governor Mike Sullivan ran for re-election to a second term. He faced Republican nominee Mary Mead, the daughter of former Governor Clifford Hansen, in the general election. Sullivan proved popular, despite being a Democrat in a conservative state, and he defeated Mead in a landslide.

1990 Wyoming gubernatorial election
Party	Candidate	Votes	%	±%
Democratic	Mike Sullivan (inc.)	104,638	65.35%	+11.40%
Republican	Mary Mead	55,471	34.65%	−11.40%
Majority		49,167	30.71%	+22.79%
Turnout		160,109		
Democratic hold				

== Secretary of State ==
Incumbent Democratic Secretary of State Kathy Karpan ran for re-election to a second term. Unopposed in the Democratic primary, she faced Sweetwater County County Attorney Tom Zollinger in the general election. Aided in part by Governor Sullivan's landslide re-election, Karpan defeated Zollinger by a large margin.

=== Democratic primary ===
==== Candidates ====
- Kathy Karpan, incumbent Secretary of State

==== Results ====
Democratic Party primary results
Party	Candidate	Votes	%
Democratic	Kathy Karpan (inc.)	40,450	100.00%
Total votes		40,450	100.00%

=== Republican primary ===
==== Candidates ====
- Tom Zollinger, Sweetwater County County Attorney

==== Results ====
Republican Primary results
Party	Candidate	Votes	%
Republican	Tom Zollinger	65,665	100.00%
Total votes		65,665	100.00%

=== General election ===
==== Results ====
1990 Wyoming Secretary of State election
Party	Candidate	Votes	%	±%
Democratic	Kathy Karpan (inc.)	100,729	64.29%	+10.71%
Republican	Tom Zollinger	55,948	35.71%	−10.71%
Majority		44,781	28.58%	+21.41%
Turnout		156,677	100.00%	
Democratic hold				

Results by county Karpan: 50–60%; 60–70%; 70–80%

== Auditor ==
After considering a bid for Governor or running for re-election, incumbent Republican State Auditor Jack Sidi declined to run for re-election. He endorsed his Deputy State Auditor, Tom Jones, who ran to succeed Sidi in the Republican primary. Jones faced former Deputy State Auditor Dave Ferrari in the primary, and ended up narrowly losing the nomination to him. No Democratic candidates initially filed to run for Auditor, but Charles Carroll announced, prior to the primary election, that he would run as a write-in candidate for Auditor. Carroll was the Democratic nominee for Secretary of State in 1974 and then served as a Deputy Attorney General in the 1970s. After winning 522 votes as a write-in candidate in the Democratic primary, Carroll received the nomination.

=== Democratic primary ===
No Democratic candidate filed to run for State Auditor, but former Deputy Attorney General Charles Carroll received enough votes as a write-in candidate to receive the nomination, which he accepted.

=== Republican primary ===
==== Candidates ====
- Dave Ferrari, former Deputy State Auditor
- Tom Jones, Deputy State Auditor

==== Results ====
Republican primary results
Party	Candidate	Votes	%
Republican	Dave Ferrari	38,567	51.68%
Republican	Tom Jones	36,062	48.32%
Total votes		74,629	100.00%

=== General election ===
==== Results ====
1990 Wyoming Auditor election
Party	Candidate	Votes	%	±%
Republican	Dave Ferrari	91,811	61.02%	+5.72%
Democratic	Charles Carroll	58,655	38.98%	−5.72%
Majority		33,156	22.04%	+11.43%
Turnout		150,466		
Republican hold				

Results by county Ferrari: 50–60%; 60–70%; 70–80%; Carroll: 50–60%

== Treasurer ==
Incumbent Republican State Treasurer Stan Smith ran for re-election to a third term. He won the Republican nomination unopposed and faced Democratic nominee Ron Redo, a former employee in the State Auditor's office, in the general election. Smith, drawing on his strong electoral record from previous campaigns, easily defeated Redo to win his third term in office.

=== Democratic primary ===
==== Candidates ====
- Ron Redo, former auditor in the Wyoming Workers' Compensation Division

==== Results ====
Democratic Party primary results
Party	Candidate	Votes	%
Democratic	Ron Redo	32,691	100.00%
Total votes		32,691	100.00%

=== Republican primary ===
==== Candidates ====
- Stan Smith, incumbent State Treasurer

==== Results ====
Republican Primary results
Party	Candidate	Votes	%
Republican	Stan Smith (inc.)	71,241	100.00%
Total votes		71,241	100.00%

=== General election ===
==== Results ====
1990 Wyoming Treasurer election
Party	Candidate	Votes	%	±%
Republican	Stan Smith (inc.)	101,194	66.67%	+4.86%
Democratic	Ron Redo	50,587	33.33%	−4.86%
Majority		50,607	33.34%	+9.73%
Turnout		151,781	100.00%	
Republican hold				

Results by county Smith: 50–60%; 60–70%; 70–80%; 80–90%; Redo: 50–60%

== Superintendent of Public Instruction ==
Incumbent Democratic Superintendent of Public Instruction Lynn Simons ran for re-election to a fourth term. She faced a strong challenge in the Democratic primary from former teacher Beth Evans, who attacked Simons for delegating too many of the office's responsibilities to others in her office, including her longtime Deputy Superintendent, Audrey Cotherman, and for "abandon[ing]" the Department of Education's "basic mission of making Wyoming schools better" in favor of "merely counting numbers and issuing press relations gimmicks." Simons only narrowly defeated Evans in the Democratic primary and advanced to the general election, where she faced elementary school principal Diana Ohman, the Republican nominee.

In the general election, Ohman attacked Simon for the poor relationships that her office fostered with teachers, state legislators, and Department of Education employees and argued that Wyoming's highly ranked schools were "not because of" Simons. Simons, meanwhile, argued that Ohman would be a "political puppet whose strings are pulled by a few ultraconservatives" and for routinely missing work during her employment as a principal. Ultimately, Ohman defeated Simons by a decisive margin, winning 58% of the vote to Simons's 42%.

=== Democratic primary ===
==== Candidates ====
- Lynn Simons, incumbent Superintendent of Public Instruction
- Beth Evans, education consultant, former Cheyenne public school teacher

==== Results ====
Democratic Party primary results
Party	Candidate	Votes	%
Democratic	Lynn Simons (inc.)	21,977	51.57%
Democratic	Beth Evans	20,642	48.43%
Total votes		42,619	100.00%

=== Republican primary ===
==== Candidates ====
- Diana Ohman, former elementary school principal
- Ann Tollefson, Casper teacher
- Don Erickson, former Mayor of Cheyenne
- Alan Stauffer, State Representative from Lincoln County

==== Results ====
Republican Party primary results
Party	Candidate	Votes	%
Republican	Diana Ohman	25,334	33.84%
Republican	Ann Tollefson	17,713	23.66%
Republican	Don Erickson	16,957	22.65%
Republican	Alan Stauffer	14,870	19.86%
Total votes		74,874	100.00%

=== General election ===
==== Results ====
1990 Wyoming Superintendent of Public Instruction election
Party	Candidate	Votes	%	±%
Republican	Diana Ohman	91,223	57.90%	+14.79%
Democratic	Lynn Simons (inc.)	66,319	42.10%	−14.79%
Majority		24,904	15.81%	+2.04%
Turnout		157,542	100.00%	
Republican gain from Democratic				

Results by county Ohman: 50–60%; 60–70%; 70–80%; Simons: 50–60%; 60–70%
