= 1974 Wyoming gubernatorial election =

- November 5, 1974
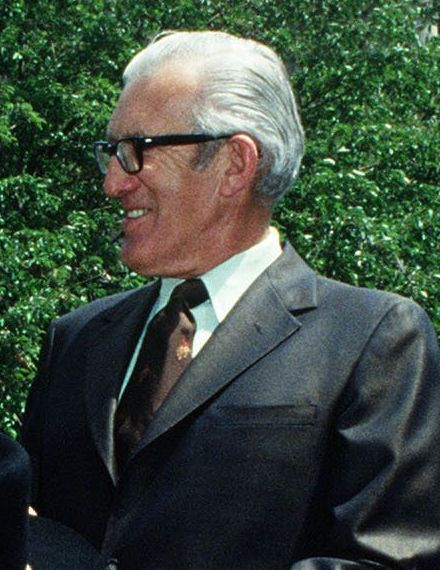

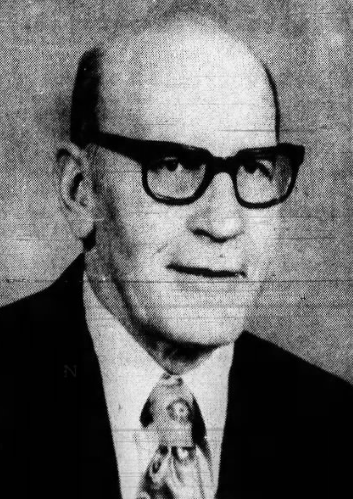
Nominee	Edgar Herschler	Dick Jones
Party	Democratic	Republican
Popular vote	71,741	56,645
Percentage	55.88%	44.12%
- County results Herschler: 50–60% 60–70% 70–80% Jones: 50–60% 60–70%
Governor before election
Stanley Hathaway
Republican
Elected Governor
Edgar Herschler
Democratic

The 1974 Wyoming gubernatorial election took place on November 5, 1974. Incumbent Republican Stanley Hathaway chose to retire rather than run for a third term as governor of Wyoming. Former Democratic State Representative Edgar Herschler defeated former Republican State Senator Dick Jones.

== Democratic primary ==
=== Candidates ===
- Edgar Herschler, former state representative
- Harry Leimback, state senator
- John J. Rooney, former state representative and nominee for governor in 1970

Democratic primary results
Party	Candidate	Votes	%
Democratic	Edgar Herschler	19,997	46.59
Democratic	Harry Leimback	15,255	35.54
Democratic	John J. Rooney	7,674	17.87
Total votes		42,926	100

== Republican primary ==
=== Candidates ===
- Clarence Brimmer, Wyoming attorney general
- Dick Jones, former state senator
- Roy Peck, state senator
- Malcolm Wallop, state senator

Republican primary results
Party	Candidate	Votes	%
Republican	Dick Jones	15,502	26.54
Republican	Malcolm Wallop	14,688	25.14
Republican	Roy Peck	14,217	24.34
Republican	Clarence Brimmer	14,014	23.98
Total votes		58,421	100

== Results ==
1974 Wyoming gubernatorial election
Party	Candidate	Votes	%	±%
Democratic	Edgar Herschler	71,741	55.88%	+18.67%
Republican	Dick Jones	56,645	44.12%	−18.67%
Majority		15,096	11.76%	−13.81%
Turnout		128,386		
Democratic gain from Republican				
