= 1966 Wyoming state elections =

A general election was held in the U.S. state of Wyoming on Tuesday, November 8, 1966. All of the state's executive officers—the Governor, Secretary of State, Auditor, Treasurer, and Superintendent of Public Instruction—were up for election. After winning all of the statewide executive offices in 1962, Republicans did even better in 1966, improving their margins of victory in each race and holding all the offices.

== Governor ==
Incumbent Republican Governor Clifford Hansen opted to run for the U.S. Senate rather than seek re-election. Former Goshen County Prosecuting Attorney Stanley Hathaway emerged as the Republican nominee, while attorney Ernest Wilkerson won a crowded and close Democratic primary. Hathaway largely duplicated Hansen's performance from four years prior, winning by a slightly smaller margin.

1966 Wyoming gubernatorial election
Party	Candidate	Votes	%	±%
Republican	Stanley Hathaway	65,624	54.29%	−0.18%
Democratic	Ernest Wilkerson	54,298	45.53%	+0.18%
Majority		10,375	8.58%	−0.36%
Turnout		120,873		
Republican hold				

== Secretary of State ==
Incumbent Republican Secretary of State Thyra Thomson ran for re-election to a second term. No Democratic candidates initially filed to run against her, but a successful write-in campaign by L. W. "Jack" Jones, a member of the University of Wyoming Board of Trustees, allowed him to claim the Democratic nomination. However, Thomson retained a considerable amount of popularity and easily defeated Jones to win a second term.

=== Democratic primary ===
==== Candidates ====
No Democratic candidates filed to oppose Thomson prior to the end of qualifying. However, the Wyoming Democratic Party selected L. W. "Jack" Jones, a member of the University of Wyoming Board of Trustees, to run a write-in campaign in the hopes of winning the nomination by that method. Jones won 3,879 votes as a write-in candidate in the primary, thereby enabling him to receive the Democratic Party's nomination, which he accepted.

=== Republican primary ===
==== Candidates ====
- Thyra Thomson, incumbent Secretary of State

==== Results ====
Republican Primary results
Party	Candidate	Votes	%
Republican	Thyra Thomson (inc.)	45,151	100.00%
Total votes		45,151	100.00%

=== General election ===
==== Results ====
1966 Wyoming Secretary of State election
Party	Candidate	Votes	%	±%
Republican	Thyra Thomson (inc.)	77,488	64.30%	+4.38%
Democratic	L. W. "Jack" Jones	43,021	35.70%	−4.38%
Majority		34,467	28.60%	+8.75%
Turnout		120,509		
Republican hold				

Results by county Thomson: 50–60%; 60–70%; 70–80%; 80–90%; Jones: 60–70%

== Auditor ==
Incumbent Republican State Auditor Minnie A. Mitchell opted to run for State Treasurer instead of for a fourth term as State Auditor, thereby allowing term-limited State Treasurer Everett T. Copenhaver to run for State Auditor. Copenhaver faced minimal challengers in his bid for Auditor, winning the Republican primary unopposed and only facing rancher Bob Bentley, the Democratic nominee, in the general election. Copenhaver ultimately defeated Bentley in a landslide.

=== Democratic primary ===
==== Candidates ====
- Bob Bentley, Lander rancher

==== Results ====
Democratic Party primary results
Party	Candidate	Votes	%
Democratic	Bob Bentley	34,265	100.00%
Total votes		34,265	100.00%

=== Republican primary ===
==== Candidates ====
- Everett T. Copenhaver, Wyoming State Treasurer

==== Results ====
Republican Primary results
Party	Candidate	Votes	%
Republican	Everett T. Copenhaver	43,328	100.00%
Total votes		43,328	100.00%

=== General election ===
==== Results ====
1966 Wyoming Auditor election
Party	Candidate	Votes	%	±%
Republican	Everett T. Copenhaver	68,714	58.03%	−1.04%
Democratic	Bob Bentley	49,688	41.97%	+1.04%
Majority		19,026	16.07%	−2.07%
Turnout		116,409		
Republican hold				

Results by county Copenhaver: 50–60%; 60–70%; 70–80%; Bentley: 50–60%; 60–70%

== Treasurer ==
Incumbent Republican State Treasurer Everett T. Copenhaver was unable to seek re-election due to term limits, but wanted to run for another state office. The decision by Secretary of State Thyra Thomson to not run for governor prevented him from running for Secretary of State, and so State Auditor Minnie A. Mitchell opted to not seek another term as Auditor so that Copenhaver could succeed her. Mitchell, in turn, filed to run for State Treasurer. She was opposed in the Republican primary by State Representative Jack Van Mark, whom she easily defeated. And in the general election, she faced Democrat Bob Adams, a former state representative who had repeatedly run for Auditor or Treasurer for the preceding 12 years. She decisively defeated Adams and returned to the office of State Treasurer, to which she had first been appointed in 1952.

=== Democratic primary ===
==== Candidates ====
- Bob Adams, former State Representative from Laramie County, 1962 Democratic nominee for Treasurer, 1958 Democratic nominee for State Auditor, 1954 Democratic nominee for State Auditor

==== Results ====
Democratic Party primary results
Party	Candidate	Votes	%
Democratic	Bob Adams	34,574	100.00%
Total votes		34,574	100.00%

=== Republican primary ===
==== Candidates ====
- Minnie A. Mitchell, Wyoming State Auditor, former State Treasurer
- Jack Van Mark, State Representative from Goshen County

==== Results ====
Republican Primary results
Party	Candidate	Votes	%
Republican	Minnie A. Mitchell	30,319	65.05%
Republican	Jack Van Mark	16,287	34.95%
Total votes		46,606	100.00%

=== General election ===
==== Results ====
1966 Wyoming Treasurer election
Party	Candidate	Votes	%	±%
Republican	Minnie A. Mitchell	67,711	56.95%	−0.78%
Democratic	Bob Adams	51,177	43.05%	+0.78%
Majority		16,534	13.91%	−1.56%
Turnout		118,888	100.00%	
Republican hold				

Results by county Mitchell: 50–60%; 60–70%; 70–80%; Adams: 50–60%; 60–70%

== Superintendent of Public Instruction ==
Incumbent Republican Superintendent of Public Instruction Cecil Shaw ran for re-election to a second term, despite some speculation that he might run for governor. Shaw was challenged in the Republican primary by Harry Roberts, a member of the state board of education, and teacher Nancy J. Rymill. During the campaign, Shaw was attacked for allegedly using state funds in assistance of his campaign, a scandal that was compounded by his poor relationship with the Republican political establishment in the state. Ultimately, Roberts defeated Shaw in the Republican primary by a decisive margin, advancing to the general election, where he faced Katherine H. Vehar, the Democratic nominee and a former Deputy State Superintendent under Superintendent Velma Linford. Roberts narrowly defeated Vehar, winning election as Superintendent.

=== Democratic primary ===
==== Candidates ====
- Katherine H. Vehar, former Deputy State Superintendent
- William G. "Bill" Rector, State Senator from Laramie County
- Robert L. Beaver, former Northwest College professor

==== Results ====
Democratic Party primary results
Party	Candidate	Votes	%
Democratic	Katherine H. Vehar	14,292	37.00%
Democratic	William G. "Bill" Rector	13,453	34.83%
Democratic	Robert L. Beaver	10,880	28.17%
Total votes		38,625	100.00%

=== Republican primary ===
==== Candidates ====
- Harry Roberts, member of the Wyoming Board of Education
- Cecil M. Shaw, incumbent State Superintendent of Public Instruction
- Nancy Jones Rymill, junior high school math teacher

==== Results ====
Republican Party primary results
Party	Candidate	Votes	%
Republican	Harry Roberts	20,599	44.15%
Republican	Cecil M. Shaw (inc.)	17,100	36.65%
Republican	Nancy Jones Rymill	8,954	19.19%
Total votes		46,653	100.00%

=== General election ===
==== Results ====
1966 Wyoming Superintendent of Public Instruction election
Party	Candidate	Votes	%	±%
Republican	Harry Roberts	62,066	52.50%	+2.19%
Democratic	Katherine H. Vehar	56,147	47.50%	−2.19%
Majority		5,919	5.01%	+4.38%
Turnout		118,213	100.00%	
Republican hold				

Results by county Roberts: 50–60%; 60–70%; 70–80%; Vehar: 50–60%; 60–70%; 70–80%
