= Warren A. Morton =

American politician

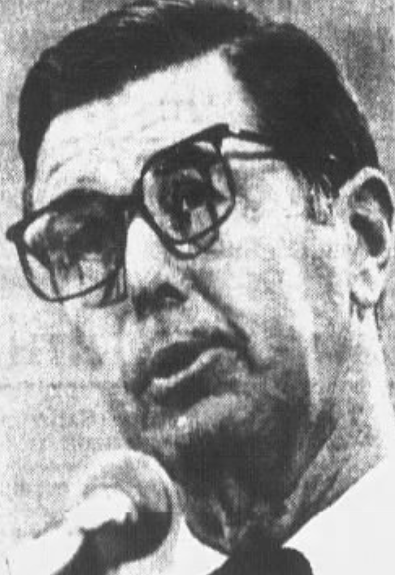
- Morton in 1982

Member of the Wyoming House of Representatives from Natrona County
- In office 1967–1980
- Preceded by: Multi-member district
- Succeeded by: Multi-member district

Speaker of the Wyoming House of Representatives
- In office 1979–1980
- Preceded by: Nels J. Smith
- Succeeded by: Bob J. Burnett

Personal details
- Born: Warren Allen Morton; March 22, 1924 Birmingham, Alabama, U.S.
- Died: February 18, 2002 (aged 77) Arizona, U.S.
- Party: Republican
- Children: 4; including Ted Morton
- Relatives: Robert G. Allen (father-in-law)
- Education: Yale University

Warren Allen Morton (March 22, 1924 – February 18, 2002) was an American politician. A member of the Republican Party, he served in the Wyoming House of Representatives from 1967 to 1980.

== Life and career ==
Morton was born in Birmingham, Alabama, the son of Linley and Ruth Morton. He attended Hotchkiss High School, graduating in 1942. After graduating, he attended Yale University, earning his degree in 1945.

Morton served in the Wyoming House of Representatives from 1967 to 1980. After his service in the House, in 1982, he ran as a Republican candidate for governor of Wyoming. He received 62,128 votes, but lost to Democratic incumbent Edgar Herschler.

== Death ==
Morton died on February 18, 2002, in Arizona, at the age of 77.
