= 1978 Wyoming gubernatorial election =

- November 7, 1978
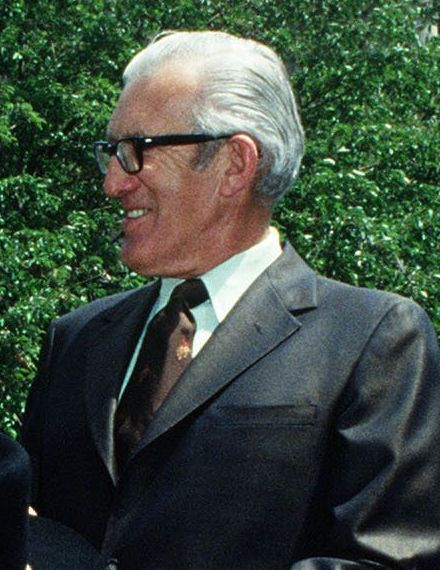

Nominee	Edgar Herschler	John C. Ostlund
Party	Democratic	Republican
Popular vote	69,972	67,595
Percentage	50.86%	49.14%
- County results Herschler: 50–60% 60–70% Ostlund: 50–60% 60–70% 70–80%
Governor before election
Edgar Herschler
Democratic
Elected Governor
Edgar Herschler
Democratic

The 1978 Wyoming gubernatorial election took place on November 7, 1978. Incumbent Democratic Governor Edgar Herschler ran for re-election to a second term. After winning a contested Democratic primary, he advanced to the general election, where he faced former State Senator John C. Ostlund, the Republican nominee. Despite the strong Republican performance nationwide, Herschler's personal popularity allowed him to narrowly win re-election to Ostlund, making him the first Democratic Governor to win re-election since Lester C. Hunt in 1946.

== Democratic primary ==
=== Candidates ===
- Edgar Herschler, incumbent Governor
- Margaret McKinstry, member of the Laramie County Community College Board of Trustees

=== Results ===
Democratic primary
Party	Candidate	Votes	%
Democratic	Edgar Herschler (incumbent)	28,406	65.28%
Democratic	Margaret McKinstry	15,111	34.72%
Total votes		43,517	100.00%

== Republican primary ==
=== Candidates ===
- John C. Ostlund, former State Senator
- Gus Fleischli, former State Representative
- Jim Bace, real estate agent

=== Results ===
Republican primary
Party	Candidate	Votes	%
Republican	John Ostlund	40,251	58.95%
Republican	Gus Fleischli	24,824	36.35%
Republican	Jim Bace	3,209	4.70%
Total votes		68,284	100.00%

== Results ==
1978 Wyoming gubernatorial election
Party	Candidate	Votes	%	±%
Democratic	Edgar Herschler (incumbent)	69,972	50.86%	−5.02%
Republican	John Ostlund	67,595	49.14%	+5.02%
Majority		2,377	1.73%	−10.03%
Turnout		137,567		
Democratic hold				
