= Richard J. Macy =

American judge (1930–2022)

Richard J. Macy (June 2, 1930 – December 30, 2022) was an American judge who was a justice of the Wyoming Supreme Court from December 2, 1985, to June 2, 2000, serving as chief justice from 1993 to 1995.

== Life and career ==
Born in Saranac Lake, New York, to Edward and Gertrude Macy, the family moved to Shell, Wyoming in 1943 to establish a bar and restaurant. Macy attended Greybull High School, graduating in 1948. He then joined the United States Navy, where he served for four years, and then returned to Wyoming. He received a B.A. from the University of Wyoming in 1955, and a J.D. from the University of Wyoming College of Law in 1958. He entered private practice in Sundance, Wyoming, and was the Crook County Attorney from 1970 to 1985. During this time he also "served on the Crook County School District #1 Board and was chairman of the Crook County Democratic Central Committee".

On May 2, 1985, Governor Edgar Herschler appointed Macy to the Wyoming Supreme Court. Macy served until he reached the mandatory retirement age of 70, on June 2, 2000.

Macy and his wife, Emily, had three children, Anne, Patricia, and Mark. Richard J. Macy died on December 30, 2022, at the age of 92.

Political offices
Preceded by John J. Rooney	Justice of the Wyoming Supreme Court; 1985–2000	Succeeded by Barton R. Voigt
