= John J. Rooney =

John J. Rooney may refer to:

- John J. Rooney (judge) (1915–1998), Wyoming Supreme Court justice
- John J. Rooney (politician) (1903–1975), congressman from New York
