= Willa Wales Corbitt =

American politician (1888–1975)

Member of the Wyoming State Senate
- In office 1965–1969

Personal details
- Born: May 24, 1888 Cheyenne, Wyoming
- Died: January 25, 1975 (aged 86) Riverton, Wyoming
- Party: Democratic

Willa Wales Corbitt (May 24, 1888 – January 25, 1975) was an American politician from the state of Wyoming. She was the first female Democratic Party member of the Wyoming State Senate. She was previously a schoolteacher. She was the first female mayor of Riverton, Wyoming. She was the first female mayor of the city. As mayor she issued a proclamation which declared the flowering hopa crabapple as the official tree of Riverton. In the 1962 Wyoming state elections she was a candidate for Treasurer of Wyoming. She was born on May 24, 1888 in Cheyenne and died on January 25, 1975 in Riverton.
