= Harry Leimback =

American politician and judge

Harry Edward Leimback (October 5, 1925 – April 15, 2011) was an American judge and politician from Wyoming.

Harry Leimback was born in Joliet, Montana, on October 5, 1925, to parents Bessy and Claude Leimback. Leimback was raised in Casper, Wyoming, where he attended Natrona County High School. He served in the Asiatic-Pacific Theater of World War II within the United States Navy upon high school graduation in 1943. Leimback enrolled at Casper College following the end of his military service. In 1948, he married Melda Christiansen, and the couple moved to Laramie, where Leimback studied at the University of Wyoming College of Law.

Leimback began his legal practice in Casper in 1951. Subsequently, mayor Tom Nicolas named Leimback a judge of the municipal court. Leimback later served as deputy Natrona County attorney alongside Ray Whitaker. In 1958, Leimback was elected county attorney in his own right. He served eight years in the position until his appointment to the Wyoming Senate, succeeding Robert Murphy. Leimback was a member of the state senate from 1966 to 1977, as he won two full terms after completing Murphy's. Leimback contested the Democratic Party primary during the 1974 Wyoming gubernatorial election. The party chose to back Edgar Herschler. When Herschler took office as governor of Wyoming, he named Leimback a judge of the 7th Judicial District Court, a position Leimback held for ten years.

Leimback died in Casper, Wyoming, on April 15, 2011, aged 85. His wife died on August 26, 2014, at the age of 83.
