= John C. Ostlund =

American politician

Member of the Wyoming Senate from Campbell County
- In office 1973–1978

Personal details
- Born: John Chapman Ostlund; September 29, 1927 Gillette, Wyoming, U.S.
- Died: April 27, 2004 (aged 76) Cheyenne, Wyoming, U.S.
- Party: Republican

John Chapman Ostlund (September 29, 1927 – April 27, 2004) was an American politician. A member of the Republican Party, he served in the Wyoming Senate from 1973 to 1978.

== Life and career ==
Ostlund was born in Gillette, Wyoming. He attended Campbell County High School, graduating in 1944. He also attended United States Naval Academy, graduating in 1949. After graduating, he was diagnosed with diabetes in 1950, and from 1961 to 1969, he served as chairman of the Campbell County Republican Party.

Ostlund served in the Wyoming Senate from 1973 to 1978. After his service in the Senate, in 1978, he ran as a Republican candidate for governor of Wyoming. He received 67,595, but lost to Democratic incumbent Edgar Herschler, who won with 69,972 votes, which after losing in the gubernatorial election, in 1984, he lost his eyesight and became completely blind.

== Death ==
Ostlund died from complications of diabetes at his home in Cheyenne, Wyoming on April 27, 2004, at the age of 76.
