= 1982 Wyoming gubernatorial election =

- November 2, 1982
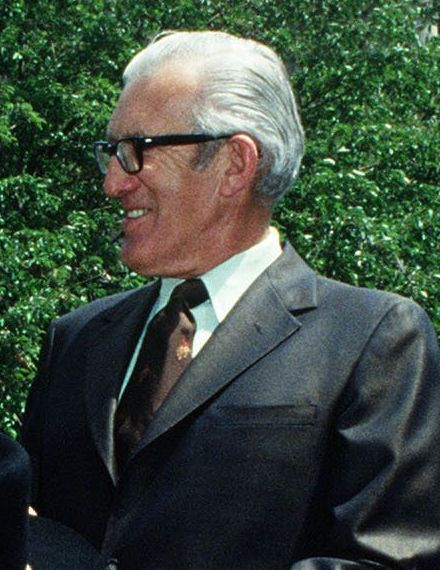

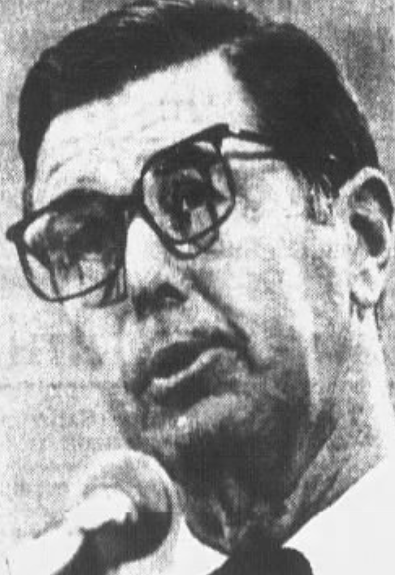
Nominee	Edgar Herschler	Warren A. Morton
Party	Democratic	Republican
Popular vote	106,427	62,128
Percentage	63.14%	36.86%
- County results Herschler: 50–60% 60–70% 70–80% Morton: 50–60%
Governor before election
Edgar Herschler
Democratic
Elected Governor
Edgar Herschler
Democratic

The 1982 Wyoming gubernatorial election took place on November 2, 1982. Incumbent Democratic Governor Edgar Herschler ran for re-election to a third term. He faced former State House Speaker Warren A. Morton in the general election after several prominent Republicans, including then-Congressman Dick Cheney, declined to challenge him. However, Herschler remained personally popular and the national political environment favored Democrats, and he had little difficulty defeating Morton to win a third term. In doing so, Herschler became the first (and, with the subsequent adoption of gubernatorial term limits, likely the last) Governor of Wyoming to win three terms in office.

== Democratic primary ==
=== Candidates ===
- Edgar Herschler, incumbent Governor
- Pat McGuire, rancher

=== Results ===
Democratic primary
Party	Candidate	Votes	%
Democratic	Edgar Herschler (incumbent)	44,396	85.19%
Democratic	Pat McGuire	7,720	14.81%
Total votes		52,116	100.00%

== Republican primary ==
=== Candidates ===
- Warren A. Morton, former Speaker of the Wyoming House of Representatives
- Rex G. Welty, Jr., Mayor of Afton
- Carl A. Johnson, perennial candidate

=== Results ===
Republican primary
Party	Candidate	Votes	%
Republican	Warren A. Morton	52,536	74.34%
Republican	Rex G. Welty, Jr.	9,106	12.89%
Republican	Carl A. Johnson	9,025	12.77%
Total votes		70,667	100.00%

== Results ==
1982 Wyoming gubernatorial election
Party	Candidate	Votes	%	±%
Democratic	Edgar Herschler (incumbent)	106,427	63.14%	+12.28%
Republican	Warren A. Morton	62,128	36.86%	−12.28%
Majority		44,299	26.28%	+24.55%
Turnout		168,555		
Democratic hold				
