= Roy Peck =

American politician

Member of the Wyoming House of Representatives
- In office 1971–1974

Member of the Wyoming Senate
- In office 1977–1983

Personal details
- Born: May 16, 1922 Rugby, North Dakota, U.S.
- Died: February 26, 1983 (aged 60)
- Party: Republican
- Spouse: Margaret McFadyen (m. 1946)
- Education: University of Wyoming

Roy Peck (May 16, 1922 – February 26, 1983) was an American politician. He served as a Republican member of the Wyoming House of Representatives and the Wyoming Senate.

== Life and career ==
Peck was born in Rugby, North Dakota. He attended the University of Wyoming.

In 1971, Peck was elected to the Wyoming House of Representatives, serving until 1974, when he was a Republican candidate for governor of Wyoming. In 1977, he was elected to the Wyoming Senate, serving until 1983.

Peck died in February 1983 of a heart attack, at the age of 60.
