= Diana Ohman =

American politician

18th Secretary of State of Wyoming
- In office January 2, 1995 – January 3, 1999
- Governor: Jim Geringer
- Preceded by: Kathy Karpan
- Succeeded by: Joseph Meyer

18th Wyoming Superintendent of Public Instruction
- In office January 7, 1991 – January 2, 1995
- Preceded by: Lynn Simons
- Succeeded by: Judy Catchpole

Personal details
- Born: Diana Jean Mahin; October 3, 1950 (age 76) Sheridan, Wyoming, U.S.
- Party: Republican
- Spouse: Gary Stover
- Education: University of Wyoming (BA, M.Ed.)

Diana Jean Ohman (born October 3, 1950) is a retired politician who served as Secretary of State of Wyoming from 1995 until 1999. Earlier in her career, Ohman held various educational positions throughout Wyoming. Ohman served as Wyoming Superintendent of Public Instruction from 1991 to 1995 before being elected Wyoming Secretary of State in 1994. After declining to run for a second term in 1998, Ohman led several divisions of the Department of Defense Education Activity from 1999 to 2011 and later joined the Department of Veteran Affairs before retiring in 2018.

== Early life and education ==
On October 3, 1950, Ohman was born in Sheridan, Wyoming and later moved to Gurley, Nebraska. After graduating from Gurley High School, Ohman attended Casper College. She later attended the University of Wyoming, receiving degrees in both primary education and administration.

== Career ==
Ohman worked for the Campbell Country School District as a teacher for 19 years. She then became the Superintendent of Laramie County School District Number 1

In 1990, Ohman defeated incumbent Democratic State Superintendent of Public Instruction Lynn Simons. During her tenure, Ohman proposed that the Wyoming School for the Deaf be shut down. The decision never materialized, however, as both Ohman and the Wyoming State Legislature decided that the school remain open the following year.

Ohman announced in April 1994 that she would not run for re-election, instead choosing to run for Secretary of State of Wyoming. In the general election, Ohman defeated Democratic nominee Nick Deegan. During her term, Ohman co-created a plan to redistribute legislative seats in Wyoming using Global Information System software. Ohman was also involved in creating awareness about securities fraud and a Secretary of State website for Wyoming. Ohman was a write-in candidate for the Governor of Wyoming position during the 1998 election and did not run again as Secretary of State. After her term ended, Ohman became a school superintendent in Laramie County, Wyoming.

In July 1999, Ohman started her time as a deputy director of the Department of Defense Education Activity (DoDEA). She led the organization's European division before being selected to lead the DoDEA's Pacific division in 2009. She remained with the DoDEA until she joined the Department of Veterans Affairs in 2011. With the National Cemetery Administration department, Ohman was in charge of cemeteries throughout the Midwestern United States until retiring in 2018.

== Awards and honors ==
As an educator, Ohman was named the best teacher for Campbell County, Wyoming in 1980 and given a 1990 state principal award from the U.S. Office of Education. For her contributions in education, Ohman was given an alumni award by Casper College Foundation in 2009.

== Personal life ==
Ohman is married and has no children.
