= Hathaway Scholarship =

Hathaway Scholarships are scholarships designed to provide an incentive for Wyoming students to prepare for and pursue postsecondary education within the State of Wyoming. The program, which was named in honor of former Wyoming Governor and U.S. Secretary of the Interior Stanley K. Hathaway, consists of merit and need-based awards. The origins of the scholarship relate to Hathaway's 1974 creation of the Wyoming Permanent Mineral Trust Fund.

Hathaway Merit Scholarships became available for eligible recipients beginning with the class of 2006 for the 2006 fall semester and as of 2018 provided more than 5,000 students with a total of $16 million in student financial aid. All community colleges as well as the University of Wyoming accept the scholarship.
