= Shirley Boice =

American politician

Member of the Wyoming House of Representatives
- In office 1951–1955

Personal details
- Party: Republican

Shirley Boice (born c.1919) was an American Republican politician from Cheyenne, Wyoming. She represented the Laramie district in the Wyoming House of Representatives from 1951 to 1955. She was married to Fred Boice.
