= 1962 Wyoming state elections =

A general election was held in the U.S. state of Wyoming on Tuesday, November 7, 1962. All of the state's executive officers—the Governor, Secretary of State, Auditor, Treasurer, and Superintendent of Public Instruction—were up for election. Republicans ran the table on the state's executive offices, defeating incumbent Governor Jack R. Gage and incumbent Superintendent Velma Linford and picking up the Secretary of State's office. Republican State Auditor Minnie A. Mitchell was re-elected and Republicans also held the Treasurer's office.

== Governor ==
After Democratic Governor John J. Hickey appointed himself to the U.S. Senate in 1961, Secretary of State Jack R. Gage, a fellow Democrat, became acting Governor. He ran for re-election in 1962 and was opposed by Republican nominee Clifford Hansen, the President of the University of Wyoming Board of Trustees. Gage lost re-election to Hansen by a wide margin, as many other Democrats around the state did poorly.

1962 Wyoming gubernatorial election
Party	Candidate	Votes	%	±%
Republican	Clifford Hansen	64,970	54.47%	+7.83%
Democratic	Jack R. Gage (inc.)	54,298	45.53%	−3.41%
Majority		10,672	8.95%	+6.65%
Turnout		119,268		
Republican gain from Democratic				

== Secretary of State ==
Incumbent Democratic Secretary of State Jack R. Gage, who also served as acting Governor, ran for re-election as Governor rather than seeking another term as Secretary of State, creating an open seat. State Treasurer Doc Rogers, who had previously served as Secretary of State and Governor, announced that he would run for the seat, but he died before qualifying ended. Accordingly, Thyra Thomson, the widow of late former Congressman and U.S. Senator-elect Keith Thomson, who had been seen as a likely candidate for the special U.S. Senate election, announced that she would seek the seat instead. Thomson defeated Frank Emerson, the son of former Governor Frank C. Emerson, in the Republican primary, and then overwhelmingly defeated former State Representative Frank L. Bowron in the general election to pick up the office for the Republican Party.

=== Democratic primary ===
==== Candidates ====
- Frank L. Bowron, former State Representative from Natrona County
- Robert Outsen, Deputy Secretary of State

==== Results ====
Democratic Party primary results
Party	Candidate	Votes	%
Democratic	Frank L. Bowron	19,801	57.28%
Democratic	Robert Outsen	14,767	42.72%
Total votes		34,568	100.00%

=== Republican primary ===
==== Candidates ====
- Thyra Thomson, widow of former Congressman and U.S. Senator-elect Keith Thomson
- Frank Emerson, former State Representative, son of Governor Frank C. Emerson

==== Results ====
Republican Primary results
Party	Candidate	Votes	%
Republican	Thyra Thomson	38,211	76.14%
Republican	Frank Emerson	11,975	23.86%
Total votes		50,186	100.00%

=== General election ===
==== Results ====
1962 Wyoming Secretary of State election
Party	Candidate	Votes	%	±%
Republican	Thyra Thomson	70,925	59.93%	+10.31%
Democratic	Frank L. Bowron	47,431	40.07%	−10.31%
Majority		23,494	19.85%	+19.09%
Turnout		118,356		
Republican gain from Democratic				

== Auditor ==
Incumbent Republican State Auditor Minnie A. Mitchell ran for re-election to a third term. She faced a challenge from State Senator David Foote in the Republican primary, whom she defeated handily. In the general election, she was opposed by Democratic nominee John E. Purcell, the Chairman of the Natrona County Board of County Commissioners. She, like other Republicans throughout the state, won her election by a wide margin, improving on her performance from 1958.

=== Democratic primary ===
==== Candidates ====
- John E. Purcell, Chairman of the Natrona County Board of County Commissioners

==== Results ====
Democratic Party primary results
Party	Candidate	Votes	%
Democratic	John E. Purcell	32,143	100.00%
Total votes		32,143	100.00%

=== Republican primary ===
==== Candidates ====
- Minnie A. Mitchell, incumbent State Auditor
- David Foote, State Senator from Natrona County

==== Results ====
Republican Primary results
Party	Candidate	Votes	%
Republican	Minnie A. Mitchell (inc.)	30,919	63.16%
Republican	David Foote	18,033	36.84%
Total votes		48,952	100.00%

=== General election ===
==== Results ====
1962 Wyoming Auditor election
Party	Candidate	Votes	%	±%
Republican	Minnie A. Mitchell (inc.)	68,764	59.07%	+7.79%
Democratic	John E. Purcell	47.645	40.93%	−7.79%
Majority		21,119	18.14%	+15.59%
Turnout		116,409		
Republican hold				

== Treasurer ==
Incumbent Republican State Treasurer Doc Rogers was unable to seek a second term due to term limits, creating an open seat. However, Rogers died prior to the end of his term, and Governor Jack R. Gage allowed Deputy Treasurer Richard J. Luman to act as Treasurer rather than appointing a replacement. Luman, however, declined to seek re-election. Prior to Rogers's death, Everett T. Copenhaver, the former Secretary of State and State Auditor, announced that he would seek the office. Copenhaver faced former State Representative Bob Adams, the Democratic nominee, who had twice before been the Democratic nominee for State Auditor, in the general election. He overwhelmingly defeated Adams, enabling his return to state government.

=== Democratic primary ===
==== Candidates ====
- Bob Adams, former State Representative from Laramie County, 1958 Democratic nominee for State Auditor, 1954 Democratic nominee for State Auditor
- Willa Wales Corbitt, Mayor of Riverton

==== Results ====
Democratic Party primary results
Party	Candidate	Votes	%
Democratic	Bob Adams	22,914	64.18%
Democratic	Willa Wales Corbitt	12,787	35.82%
Total votes		35,701	100.00%

=== Republican primary ===
==== Candidates ====
- Everett T. Copenhaver, former Secretary of State, former State Auditor
- C. R. "Cal" Dodge, Laramie businessman
- Jay Brown, former State Representative from Laramie County

==== Results ====
Republican Primary results
Party	Candidate	Votes	%
Republican	Everett T. Copenhaver	27,401	56.89%
Republican	C. R. "Cal" Dodge	11,262	23.38%
Republican	Jay Brown	9,503	19.73%
Total votes		48,166	100.00%

=== General election ===
==== Results ====
1962 Wyoming Treasurer election
Party	Candidate	Votes	%	±%
Republican	Everett T. Copenhaver	66,604	57.73%	+1.86%
Democratic	Bob Adams	48,762	42.27%	−1.86%
Majority		17,842	15.47%	+3.72%
Turnout		115,366	100.00%	
Republican hold				

== Superintendent of Public Instruction ==
Incumbent Democratic Superintendent of Public Instruction Velma Linford ran for re-election to a third term in office. She faced Cecil M. Shaw, an instructor at Casper College, who won a contested Republican primary over Assistant State Treasurer Duke DeForest, as her general election opponent. Linford significantly outpaced the rest of the statewide Democratic ticket, but it wasn't enough for her to win re-election; she fell short of a third term by just 737 votes.

=== Democratic primary ===
==== Candidates ====
- Velma Linford, incumbent Superintendent of Public Instruction

==== Results ====
Democratic Party primary results
Party	Candidate	Votes	%
Democratic	Velma Linford (inc.)	31,334	100.00%
Total votes		31,334	100.00%

=== Republican primary ===
==== Candidates ====
- Cecil M. Shaw, Casper College instructor, field coordinator for the University of Wyoming
- F. J. "Duke" DeForest, Assistant State Treasurer

==== Results ====
Republican Party primary results
Party	Candidate	Votes	%
Republican	Cecil M. Shaw	26,672	57.44%
Republican	F. J. "Duke" DeForest	19,761	42.56%
Total votes		46,433	100.00%

=== General election ===
==== Results ====
1962 Wyoming Superintendent of Public Instruction election
Party	Candidate	Votes	%	±%
Republican	Cecil Shaw	58,867	50.31%	+8.13%
Democratic	Velma Linford (inc.)	58,130	49.69%	−8.13%
Majority		737	0.63%	−15.01%
Turnout		116,997	100.00%	
Republican gain from Democratic				

Results by county Shaw: 50–60%; 60–70%; 70–80%; Linford: 50–60%; 60–70%
