= Dick Jones (Wyoming politician) =

American politician (1910–2008)

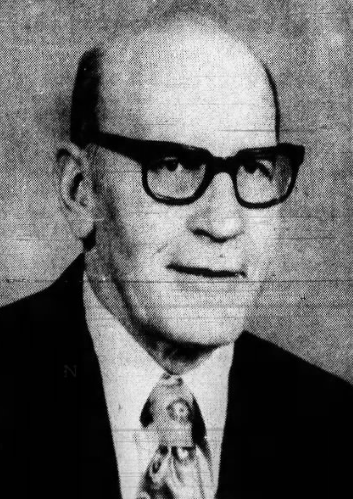
- Jones in 1974

Member of the Wyoming House of Representatives from Park County
- In office 1955–1957
- Preceded by: W. W. Anderson
- Succeeded by: Joe Fitzstephens

Member of the Wyoming Senate from Park County
- In office 1957–1973
- Preceded by: Dewitt Dominick
- Succeeded by: Ross D. Copenhaver

Personal details
- Born: Richard Ray Jones; September 5, 1910 Huntley, Montana, U.S.
- Died: August 20, 2008 (aged 97) Powell, Wyoming, U.S.
- Party: Republican
- Spouse: Evelyn Jones (m. 1987)
- Children: 3

Richard Ray Jones (September 5, 1910 – August 20, 2008) was an American politician. A member of the Republican Party, he served in the Wyoming House of Representatives from 1955 to 1957 and in the Wyoming Senate from 1957 to 1973.

== Life and career ==
Jones born in Huntley, Montana, the son of Alfred and Elsa Jones. He attended Huntley Project High School, graduating in 1928. After graduating, he operated his own trucking company in Powell, Wyoming.

Jones served in the Wyoming House of Representatives from 1955 to 1957. After his service in the House, he then served in the Wyoming Senate from 1957 to 1973, which after his service in the Senate, in 1974, he ran as a Republican candidate for governor of Wyoming. He received 56,645 votes, but lost to Democratic candidate Edgar Herschler, who won with 71,741 votes.

== Death ==
Jones died on August 20, 2008, at the Powell Hospital in Powell, Wyoming, at the age of 97.
