= Gus Fleischli =

American politician (1925–2024)

Gus Fleischli Jr

Member of the Wyoming House of Representatives
- In office 1973–1979

Personal details
- Born: December 26, 1925 Rawlins, Wyoming, U.S.
- Died: July 21, 2024 (aged 98) Cheyenne, Wyoming, U.S.
- Party: Republican
- Spouse: Patricia Sitzman
- Children: Kirk, Ketura (Kit), Kris
- Education: University of Wyoming
- Occupation: Marketer

Gus Fleischli Jr (December 26, 1925 – July 21, 2024) was an American politician in the state of Wyoming. He served in the Wyoming House of Representatives as a member of the Republican Party.

== Early life and career ==
Born in 1925, Fleischli attended Cheyenne High School and then the University of Wyoming. He abandoned his studies at the age of 17 in order to join the Army Air Corps, where he flew 32 missions over Germany as a gunner on B-17 Bombers during World War II. He later worked as a petroleum marketer and truck stop operator.

== Political career ==
Fleischli served in the Wyoming House of Representatives as a member of the Republican Party. He resigned in 1977 during his third term in order to run, unsuccessfully, as governor.

== Later life and death ==
In 2010, Fleischli was awarded an honorary doctorate in law from the University of Wyoming. In 2012, he was presented with an award for his community work including organizing a veterans' trip to Washington D.C. Fleischli died in Cheyenne, Wyoming, on July 21, 2024, at the age of 98.
