= Wyoming School for the Deaf =

School for deaf students in Wyoming, US

Coordinates: 42°50′39″N 106°17′12″W

The Wyoming School for the Deaf was a school for deaf elementary students located in Casper, Wyoming, United States. The school was open from 1961 until it was closed due to a lack of students in 2000. The school was created to accommodate the concerns of parents who did not want to send their deaf children to schools in other states. Early pilot programs were conducted, and in 1959, a house was purchased across from the local Pineview Elementary School and used to house the program. In 1961, the state legislature appropriated more funds for the program and a permanent school was built and dedicated in 1963.

The dormitory facility opened in 1990; before that date students stayed with host families. The student population declined after federal guidelines came into place which required that deaf students generally be instructed in locations near their houses. The school was closed in 2000, with only one student enrolled. All the other students had been mainstreamed into regular schools. In 2007, the Natrona County School District announced that they would be tearing down the building, which resulted in an outcry from alumni of the school, who wanted to see the building preserved.

As of 2011, the building is still standing. The original portion is used as a library and resource center for the deaf/hard-of-hearing and visually impaired in the area, with various services provided. No money has been available to tear down the old building and rebuild Pineview Elementary School.

As of summer of 2013, plans are underway to demolish Pineview Elementary and the Wyoming School for the Deaf. The Casper Historic Preservation Commission and the school's alumni are both fighting the proposed demolition, which would take place in 2014 under plans to build a replacement for Pineview Elementary. Funding for the construction still has to be approved by the Legislature, which is scheduled to consider the issue at next year's session. It will remain standing until money is available for the project — including the school's demolition.
