= Elizabeth Phelan =

American politician

Member of the Wyoming House of Representatives
- In office 1969–1971
- In office 1973–1975
- In office 1977–1985

Personal details
- Born: January 11, 1920 Casper, Wyoming, U.S.
- Died: July 22, 2016 (aged 96)
- Party: Democratic
- Spouse: Walter B. Phelan (died 1966)
- Occupation: real estate business

Elizabeth Phelan (January 11, 1920 – July 22, 2016) was an American politician in the state of Wyoming. She served in the Wyoming House of Representatives as a member of the Democratic Party. She attended Laramie County Community College and worked in the real estate business.
