= John J. Rooney (judge) =

American judge (1915–1998)

Justice of the Wyoming Supreme Court
- In office 1979–1985
- Appointed by: Edgar J. Herschler

Personal details
- Born: November 30, 1915 Chadron, Nebraska, U.S.
- Died: December 12, 1998 (aged 83) Cheyenne, Wyoming, U.S.

John Joseph Rooney (November 30, 1915 – December 12, 1998) was an American jurist who served as a justice of the Wyoming Supreme Court from January 1, 1979, to November 30, 1985.

Rooney was born in Chadron, Nebraska, on November 30, 1915. He attended the University of Minnesota and also played football. The University of Colorado later recruited him for its football team where he was a blocking back for Supreme Court Justice Byron White. Justice White credited Rooney's blocking as contributing to his success as a CU running back.

Rooney went on to earn a law degree from the University of Colorado in 1940. He was a special agent of the Federal Bureau of Investigation (FBI) from 1941 to 1958, working closely with then United States Attorney John J. Hickey.

Rooney's legal career in Wyoming began with his admission to the bar in 1954. From 1954 to 1958 he, and others, practiced law in Cheyenne with John J. Hickey. While practicing law in Cheyenne, he served in the Wyoming House of Representatives from 1969 to 1971. He ran for Governor of Wyoming in 1970, receiving the nomination of the Democratic party but losing to the incumbent Republican governor Stanley K. Hathaway by a 62.79% to 37.21% margin. He served as Cheyenne City Attorney (1968–1970), and as Laramie County School District Number 1 attorney (1974–78). Governor Edgar Herschler chose him to be Wyoming Attorney General in 1978, where he served until Governor Herschler appointed him to the Wyoming Supreme Court in 1979. After his mandatory retirement from the court at the age of 70, he returned to private law practice as a member of the Cheyenne firm of Rooney, Bagley, Hickey, Evans and Statkus.

In 1977, the football teammates, White and Rooney, were reunited when, at Rooney's request, Justice White delivered the keynote address at the Wyoming State Bar Convention.

Rooney and his wife Velma (Kruse) had six children. He died in Cheyenne on December 12, 1998.

Party political offices
Preceded by Ernest Wilkerson	Democratic nominee for Governor of Wyoming; 1970	Succeeded by Edgar Herschler
Legal offices
Preceded by Rodney M. Guthrie	Justice of Wyoming Supreme Court; 1979-1985	Succeeded by Richard J. Macy
