= 1970 Wyoming gubernatorial election =

1970 Wyoming election

- November 3, 1970
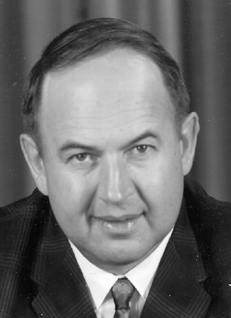

| Nominee | Stanley Hathaway | John J. Rooney |
| Party | Republican | Democratic |
| Popular vote | 74,249 | 44,008 |
| Percentage | 62.79% | 37.21% |
- County results Hathaway: 50–60% 60–70% 70–80% 80–90% Rooney: 50–60%
Governor before election
Stanley Hathaway
Republican
Elected Governor
Stanley Hathaway
Republican

The 1970 Wyoming gubernatorial election took place on November 3, 1970. Incumbent Republican governor Stanley Hathaway ran for re-election to a second term. He faced Democratic nominee John J. Rooney, a state representative and the former chairman of the Wyoming Democratic Party. Despite Democratic senator Gale W. McGee's strong performance in the U.S. Senate race, Hathaway's popularity proved an insurmountable obstacle for Rooney to overcome, and the Governor won a second term in a landslide.

After this race, no Republican would be elected Governor of Wyoming until 1994. This was the first time since 1930 that an incumbent Republican Governor of Wyoming was re-elected or won re-election.

== Democratic primary ==
=== Candidates ===
- John J. Rooney, state representative, former chairman of the Wyoming Democratic Party

=== Results ===
Democratic primary
| Party | Candidate | Votes | % |
|---|---|---|---|
| Democratic | John J. Rooney | 33,914 | 100.00% |
| Total votes | | 33,914 | 100.00% |

== Republican primary ==
=== Candidates ===
- Stanley Hathaway, incumbent Governor

=== Results ===
Republican primary
| Party | Candidate | Votes | % |
|---|---|---|---|
| Republican | Stanley Hathaway (inc.) | 44,284 | 100.00% |
| Total votes | | 44,284 | 100.00% |

== Results ==
1970 Wyoming gubernatorial election
| Party | Candidate | Votes | % | ±% |
|---|---|---|---|---|
| Republican | Stanley Hathaway (inc.) | 74,249 | 62.79% | +8.49% |
| Democratic | John J. Rooney | 44,008 | 37.21% | −8.49% |
| Majority | | 30,241 | 25.57% | +16.99% |
| Turnout | | 118,257 | | |
| Republican hold | | | | |
