= Velma Linford =

American educator, author and politician

12th Wyoming Superintendent of Public Instruction
- In office January 3, 1955 – January 7, 1963
- Preceded by: Edna B. Stolt
- Succeeded by: Cecil M. Shaw

Personal details
- Born: Velma Isabelle Linford; May 30, 1907 Afton, Wyoming, U.S.
- Died: May 25, 2002 (aged 94) Salt Lake City, Utah, U.S.
- Resting place: Afton Cemetery, Afton, Wyoming, U.S.
- Party: Democratic
- Parents: John Amasa Linford (father); Elizabeth Rowland Linford (mother)
- Education: University of Wyoming

Velma Linford (May 30, 1907 – May 25, 2002) was an American educator, author, and politician who served as the 12th Wyoming Superintendent of Public Instruction as a Democrat.

== Life ==
Velma Isabelle Linford was born on May 30, 1907, in Afton, Wyoming, to John Amasa Linford and Elizabeth Rowland Linford. She attended Star Valley High School where she graduated in 1926 and then attended the University of Wyoming where she earned a bachelor's degree in 1930 and then a master's degree in 1934. From 1933 to 1955 she taught at Laramie High School. In 1946 she wrote "Wyoming: Frontier State" a history textbook meant for junior high school. In 1949 she was elected as National Education Association director for Wyoming at its convention in Boston, Massachusetts and on July 8, 1953, she was named to the eleven member executive committee of the organization.

=== Politics ===
On June 12, 1946, she filed to run for the Democratic nomination for Superintendent of Public Instruction and after winning the nomination was narrowly defeated by Edna B. Stolt. It was speculated that she would run for the office again in 1950, but chose not to.

On June 10, 1954, she announced that she would seek the Democratic nomination for Superintendent of Public Instruction and after winning the nomination without opposition narrowly defeated Ray E. Robertson in the general election. During her tenure she sponsored the first statewide mental survey of children in Wyoming. In 1959 she was one of sixty people in the Atlantic Congress representing 15 NATO countries that met in London and drafted the Atlantic charter for free people. On June 18, 1962, she announced that she would seek a third term, but was narrowly defeated in the general election by Cecil Shaw by 737 votes.

On May 31, 1960, she announced that she would seek the Democratic nomination for Senator, but was narrowly defeated in the primary by Raymond B. Whitaker who went on to lose to Representative Edwin Keith Thomson. In 1968 she announced that she would seek the Democratic nomination for Wyoming's at-large congressional district, but was defeated in a landslide by John S. Wold.

=== Later life ===
In 1966 she accepted a position in VISTA and oversaw the VISTA program in the Wind River Indian Reservation and recruited volunteers. She died on May 25, 2002, in Salt Lake City, Utah and was then interred in Afton Cemetery in Afton, Wyoming.

== Electoral history ==
Velma Linford electoral history

1954 Superintendent of Public Instruction election
Party	Candidate	Votes	%
Democratic	Velma Linford	54,438	50.88%
Republican	Ray E. Robertson	52,558	49.12%
Total votes		106,996	100.00%

1960 Senate Democratic primary
Party	Candidate	Votes	%
Democratic	Raymond B. Whitaker	18,031	44.14%
Democratic	Velma Linford	13,792	33.77%
Democratic	Carl A. Johnson	5,370	13.15%
Democratic	Charles B. Chittim	3,653	8.94%
Total votes		40,846	100.00%

1962 Superintendent of Public Instruction election
Party	Candidate	Votes	%
Republican	Cecil Shaw	58,867	50.32%
Democratic	Velma Linford	58,130	49.69%
Total votes		116,997	100.00%

1968 at-large Congressional District Democratic primary
Party	Candidate	Votes	%
Democratic	Velma Linford	15,633	47.63%
Democratic	Raymond B. Whitaker	12,054	36.73%
Democratic	David C. Laird	4,102	12.50%
Democratic	George W.K. Posvar	1,033	3.15%
Total votes		32,822	100.00%

1968 at-large Congressional District election
Party	Candidate	Votes	%	±%
Republican	John S. Wold	77,363	62.74%	+10.44%
Democratic	Velma Linford	45,950	37.26%	−10.44%
Total votes		123,313	100.00%	
