= Lynn Simons =

American politician

17th Wyoming Superintendent of Public Instruction
- In office January 1, 1979 – January 7, 1991
- Preceded by: Robert G. Schrader
- Succeeded by: Diana Ohman

Personal details
- Born: June 1, 1934 Havre, Montana, U.S.
- Died: August 30, 2025 (aged 91) Cheyenne, Wyoming, U.S.
- Party: Democratic
- Education: University of Colorado; University of Wyoming

Lynn Simons (June 1, 1934 – August 30, 2025) was an American politician and educator who served as the 17th Wyoming Superintendent of Public Instruction from 1979 to 1991, as a member of the Democratic Party. She unsuccessfully sought the Democratic nomination for U.S. Senate in 1988.

== Early life ==
Lynn Simons was born on June 1, 1934, in Havre, Montana. She briefly lived in Flint, Michigan before relocating to Golden, Colorado, where she grew up. She graduated with a bachelor's degree in English from the University of Colorado and a master's degree in American studies from the University of Wyoming. In 1957, she joined the American Civil Liberties Union.

== Career ==
=== Board of education ===
In 1971, Simons was appointed by Governor Stanley K. Hathaway to a six-year term on the Wyoming Board of Education to replace Harry F. Hays. She was selected to serve as president of the Wyoming Committee on School Organization in 1975. During her tenure on the Wyoming Board of Education, she served as vice-chair and chair of the board.

=== Superintendent of Public Instruction ===
On April 5, 1978, Simons announced that she would seek the Democratic nomination for Wyoming Superintendent of Public Instruction. She won the Democratic nomination against Sydney Spiegel, a history teacher, and defeated incumbent Republican Superintendent Robert Schrader. She was reelected in 1982 and 1986. In 1990, Simons sought reelection, but was defeated by Republican nominee Diana Ohman.

During the 1980 presidential election Simons endorsed President Jimmy Carter for reelection. In 1982, she gave support to a court case in which the Supreme Court of the United States ruled that the children of illegal immigrants could get a free public education. During the 1984 presidential election she endorsed Senator Gary Hart for the Democratic presidential nomination. In 1985, Simons led a twenty-member education delegation that visited schools in China and the Soviet Union. In 1985, Lynn was named to the Steering Committee of the Education Commission of the States.

Simons sought the Democratic nomination for the 1988 United States Senate election, but lost in the Democratic primary to John P. Vinch.

Simons is the last Democrat to serve in this position.

== Later life ==
Simons was appointed by President Bill Clinton to serve as a six-state region representative for Secretary of Education Richard Riley in 1993. In 2003, she was appointed by Governor Dave Freudenthal to be Wyoming planning coordinator, but only served for five months before leaving the office. During the 2020 presidential election Simons endorsed Joe Biden for the Democratic presidential nomination.

== Electoral history ==
1978 Wyoming Superintendent of Public Instruction election
Party	Candidate	Votes	%
Democratic	Lynn Simons	69,261	52.70%
Republican	Robert Schrader (incumbent)	62,165	47.30%
Total votes		131,426	100.00%

1982 Wyoming Superintendent of Public Instruction election
Party	Candidate	Votes	%
Democratic	Lynn Simons (incumbent)	92,270	56.97%
Republican	Gary Elliott	69,699	43.03%
Total votes		161,969	100.00%

1986 Wyoming Superintendent of Public Instruction election
Party	Candidate	Votes	%
Democratic	Lynn Simons (incumbent)	90,978	57.05%
Republican	Millard Meredith	68,960	42.95%
Total votes		159,938	100.00%

1990 Wyoming Superintendent of Public Instruction election
Party	Candidate	Votes	%
Republican	Diana Ohman	91,223	57.90%
Democratic	Lynn Simons (incumbent)	66,319	42.10%
Total votes		157,542	100.00%
