= 1958 Wyoming state elections =

A general election was held in the U.S. state of Wyoming on Tuesday, November 4, 1958. All of the state's executive officers—the governor, secretary of state, auditor, treasurer, and superintendent of public instruction—were up for election. Democrats had a largely good year, picking up the governorship and the secretary of state's office and holding the state superintendent's office, though Republicans were returned as state auditor and state treasurer.

== Governor ==
Incumbent Republican governor Milward Simpson ran for re-election to a second term. He was challenged by Democratic nominee John J. Hickey, the former U.S. attorney for the District of Wyoming, and by Louis W. Carlson, the former mayor of Newcastle, who formed the Economy Party to support his pro-gambling platform. Simpson narrowly lost re-election to Hickey, who won a slim plurality as Carlson siphoned away votes.

1958 Wyoming gubernatorial election
Party	Candidate	Votes	%	±%
Democratic	John J. Hickey	55,070	48.94%	−0.57%
Republican	Milward Simpson (inc.)	52,488	46.64%	−3.86%
Economy	Louis W. Carlson	4,979	4.42%	−
Majority		2,582	2.29%	+1.30%
Turnout		112.537		
Democratic gain from Republican				

== Secretary of State ==
Incumbent Republican Secretary of State Everett T. Copenhaver ran for re-election to a second term. After defeating former State Land Commissioner John Riedel in the Republican primary, he faced Democratic nominee Jack R. Gage, the former State Superintendent of Public Instruction from several decades prior. Gage ended up narrowly defeating Copenhaver. During Gage's term as Secretary of State, he would also act as Governor after Governor Hickey appointed himself to the U.S. Senate in 1961.

=== Democratic primary ===
==== Candidates ====
- Jack R. Gage, former Wyoming Superintendent of Public Instruction

==== Results ====
Democratic Party primary results
Party	Candidate	Votes	%
Democratic	Jack R. Gage	32,528	100.00%
Total votes		32,528	100.00%

=== Republican primary ===
==== Candidates ====
- Everett T. Copenhaver, incumbent Secretary of State
- John Riedel, former State Land Commissioner

==== Results ====
Republican Primary results
Party	Candidate	Votes	%
Republican	Everett T. Copenhaver (inc.)	27,679	77.25%
Republican	John Riedel	8,150	22.75%
Total votes		35,829	100.00%

=== General election ===
==== Results ====
1958 Wyoming Secretary of State election
Party	Candidate	Votes	%	±%
Democratic	Jack R. Gage	55,843	50.38%	+7.43%
Republican	Everett T. Copenhaver (inc.)	54,996	49.62%	−7.43%
Majority		847	0.76%	−13.34%
Turnout		110,839		
Democratic gain from Republican				

== Auditor ==
Incumbent Republican State Auditor Minnie A. Mitchell ran for re-election to a second term. She was once again challenged by State Representative Bob Adams, the Democratic nominee, who had also been her challenger four years prior. Adams improved on his performance from 1958, but nonetheless fell short of unseating Mitchell.

=== Democratic primary ===
==== Candidates ====
- Bob Adams, State Representative from Laramie County

==== Results ====
Democratic Party primary results
Party	Candidate	Votes	%
Democratic	Bob Adams	32,078	100.00%
Total votes		32,078	100.00%

=== Republican primary ===
==== Candidates ====
- Minnie A. Mitchell, incumbent State Auditor

==== Results ====
Republican Primary results
Party	Candidate	Votes	%
Republican	Minnie A. Mitchell (inc.)	33,764	100.00%
Total votes		33,764	100.00%

=== General election ===
==== Results ====
1958 Wyoming Auditor election
Party	Candidate	Votes	%	±%
Republican	Minnie A. Mitchell (inc.)	56,758	51.28%	−2.11%
Democratic	Bob Adams	53,933	48.72%	+2.11%
Majority		2,825	2.55%	−4.22%
Turnout		110,691		
Republican hold				

== Treasurer ==
Incumbent Republican State Treasurer Charles B. Morgan was unable to seek re-election to a second term due to term limits. Former Governor Doc Rogers, who had previously served as State Treasurer, ran to succeed Morgan. He won the Republican primary against State Representative Robert Fair and faced Carl A. Johnson, the Democratic nominee, an accountant from Cheyenne. Owing at least in part to his record of electoral successes, Rogers easily defeated Johnson, returning to the Treasurer's office.

=== Democratic primary ===
==== Candidates ====
- Carl A. Johnson, Cheyenne accountant
- Ira Whitlock, Worland bank executive

==== Results ====
Democratic Party primary results
Party	Candidate	Votes	%
Democratic	Carl A. Johnson	20,137	60.86%
Democratic	Ira Whitlock	12,949	39.14%
Total votes		33,086	100.00%

=== Republican primary ===
==== Candidates ====
- Doc Rogers, former governor of Wyoming
- Robert J. Fair, State Representative from Sheridan County

==== Results ====
Republican Primary results
Party	Candidate	Votes	%
Republican	Doc Rogers	24,430	68.55%
Republican	Robert J. Fair	11,206	31.45%
Total votes		35,636	100.00%

=== General election ===
==== Results ====
1958 Wyoming Treasurer election
Party	Candidate	Votes	%	±%
Republican	Doc Rogers	61,172	55.87%	+2.46%
Democratic	Carl A. Johnson	48,310	44.13%	−2.46%
Majority		12,862	11.75%	+4.92%
Turnout		109,482	100.00%	
Republican hold				

== Superintendent of Public Instruction ==
Incumbent Democratic Superintendent of Public Instruction Velma Linford ran for re-election to a second term in office. She faced a challenge from former state representative Shirley Boice, one of the few women to have been elected to the legislature by that point in history. Linford once again outperformed the rest of the state Democratic ticket and defeated Boice in a landslide to win her second and final term as Superintendent.

=== Democratic primary ===
==== Candidates ====
- Velma Linford, incumbent Superintendent of Public Instruction

==== Results ====
Democratic Party primary results
Party	Candidate	Votes	%
Democratic	Velma Linford	32,209	100.00%
Total votes		32,209	100.00%

=== Republican primary ===
==== Candidates ====
- Shirley Boice, former state representative from Laramie County

==== Results ====
Republican Party primary results
Party	Candidate	Votes	%
Republican	Shirley Boice	31,619	100.00%
Total votes		31,619	100.00%

=== General election ===
==== Results ====
1958 Wyoming Superintendent of Public Instruction election
Party	Candidate	Votes	%	±%
Democratic	Velma Linford (inc.)	64,710	57.82%	+6.94%
Republican	Shirley Boice	46,817	42.18%	−6.94%
Majority		17,353	15.64%	+13.88%
Turnout		106,996	100.00%	
Democratic hold				
