= Edgar Herschler =

American politician (1918–1990)

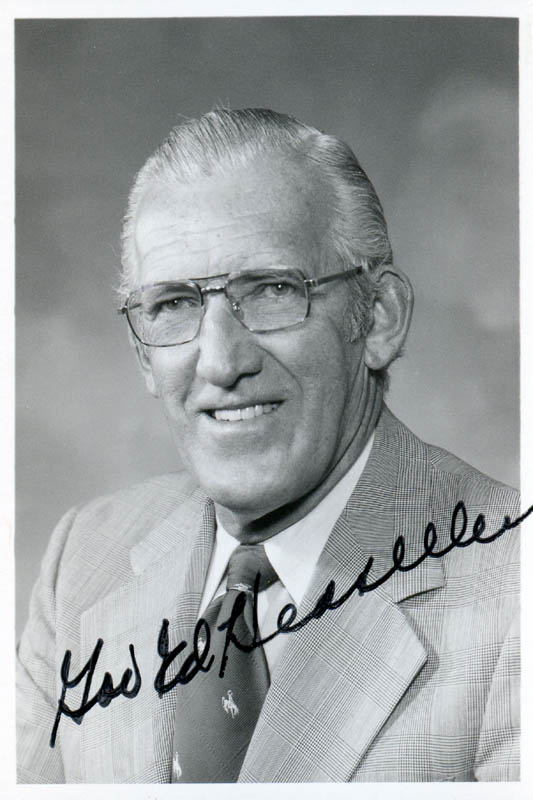

28th Governor of Wyoming
- In office January 6, 1975 – January 5, 1987
- Preceded by: Stanley K. Hathaway
- Succeeded by: Mike Sullivan

Member of the Wyoming House of Representatives from Lincoln County
- In office January 1963 – January 1971
- In office January 1961 – July 12, 1961

Personal details
- Born: Edgar Jacob Herschler; October 27, 1918 Kemmerer, Wyoming, U.S.
- Died: February 5, 1990 (aged 71) Cheyenne, Wyoming, U.S.
- Resting place: Kemmerer Cemetery. Kemmerer, Wyoming, U.S.
- Party: Democratic
- Spouse: Kathleen Sue Colter
- Children: 2
- Parents: Edgar Fuller Herschler (father); Charlotte Jenkins (mother)
- Education: University of Colorado (BA); University of Wyoming (LLB)
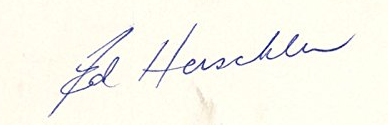
- Signature

Military service
- Allegiance: United States
- Branch/service: United States Marine Corps
- Battles/wars: World War II
- Awards: Silver Star

Edgar Jacob Herschler (October 27, 1918 – February 5, 1990) was an American politician and attorney who served as the 28th governor of Wyoming from 1975 to 1987. A member of the Democratic Party, he is the longest-serving governor of Wyoming, with three full terms; since a two-term limit for governors was approved by a ballot initiative in 1992, he has remained as such.

== Early life ==
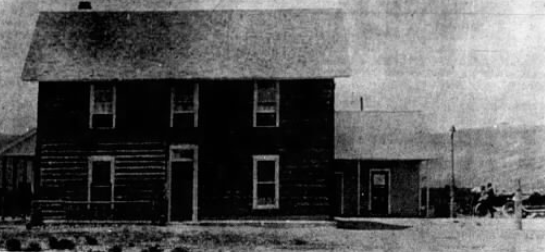
The Herschler family ranch in 1912

Edgar Jacob Herschler was born in Kemmerer, Wyoming, on October 27, 1918, to Edgar Fuller Herschler and Charlotte Jenkins. During his childhood, he was initially taught at his family's ranch before later attending high school in Kemmerer. In 1941, he graduated from the University of Colorado with a Bachelor of Arts in Pre-Law.

In January 1942, Herschler enlisted in the United States Marine Corps and served as a Marine Raider in the Pacific Theater during World War II. On November 23, 1943, during the invasion of Bougainville, Herschler volunteered to help evacuate wounded out of danger. Risking his own life, he rescued another Marine and was himself wounded. For his actions there, he was awarded the Silver Star Medal.

In 1949, he earned his LL.B from the University of Wyoming. He served as Kemmerer's city attorney and then as Lincoln County attorney from 1951 to 1958 and from 1961 to 1963.

== Career ==
=== Legislature ===
On June 15, 1960, he filed to run for the Democratic nomination for one of Lincoln County's three seats in the Wyoming House of Representatives and won in the general election. Upon taking office he introduced a bill that would repeal Wyoming's inheritance tax. However, after the initial forty day session of the house he resigned on March 10, 1961, to become Lincoln County's attorney again, but filed to run for the house again in 1962 and won a seat in the general election placing second. In the 1964 elections the Democrats took control of the state house and in the 1965 legislative session Herschler was selected as House Majority Whip and made chairman of the House Judiciary Committee. In 1967, he cosponsored the first air pollution control bill in Wyoming and on September 13, 1968, he was elected as president of the Wyoming State Bar Association.

He was considered a possible candidate for governor in the 1970 election, but stated on December 10, 1969, that he was not interested in running for governor. On April 27, 1970, he announced that he would run for the Democratic nomination for Wyoming's at-large congressional district, but was defeated by former Representative Teno Roncalio who went on to win in the general election. On October 27, he endorsed Roncalio following his defeat in the August primary. In 1971 he stated that he was contacted by Governor Stanley K. Hathaway as being a possible appointment to the Wyoming Supreme Court, but was not selected.

=== Governor ===
On May 23, 1974, he announced that he would seek the Democratic nomination for governor and defeated former state senator Dick Jones in the general election. He was critical of President Jimmy Carter for his agricultural stances and water projects and when Carter visited Grand Teton National Park from August 24 to September 1, 1978, he had Herschler notified that he was not invited.

In 1978, he narrowly won reelection by 2,377 votes, but easily won reelection to a third term in 1982 becoming Wyoming's only governor to serve more than two terms. In 1986 he announced that he would not seek reelection to a fourth term.

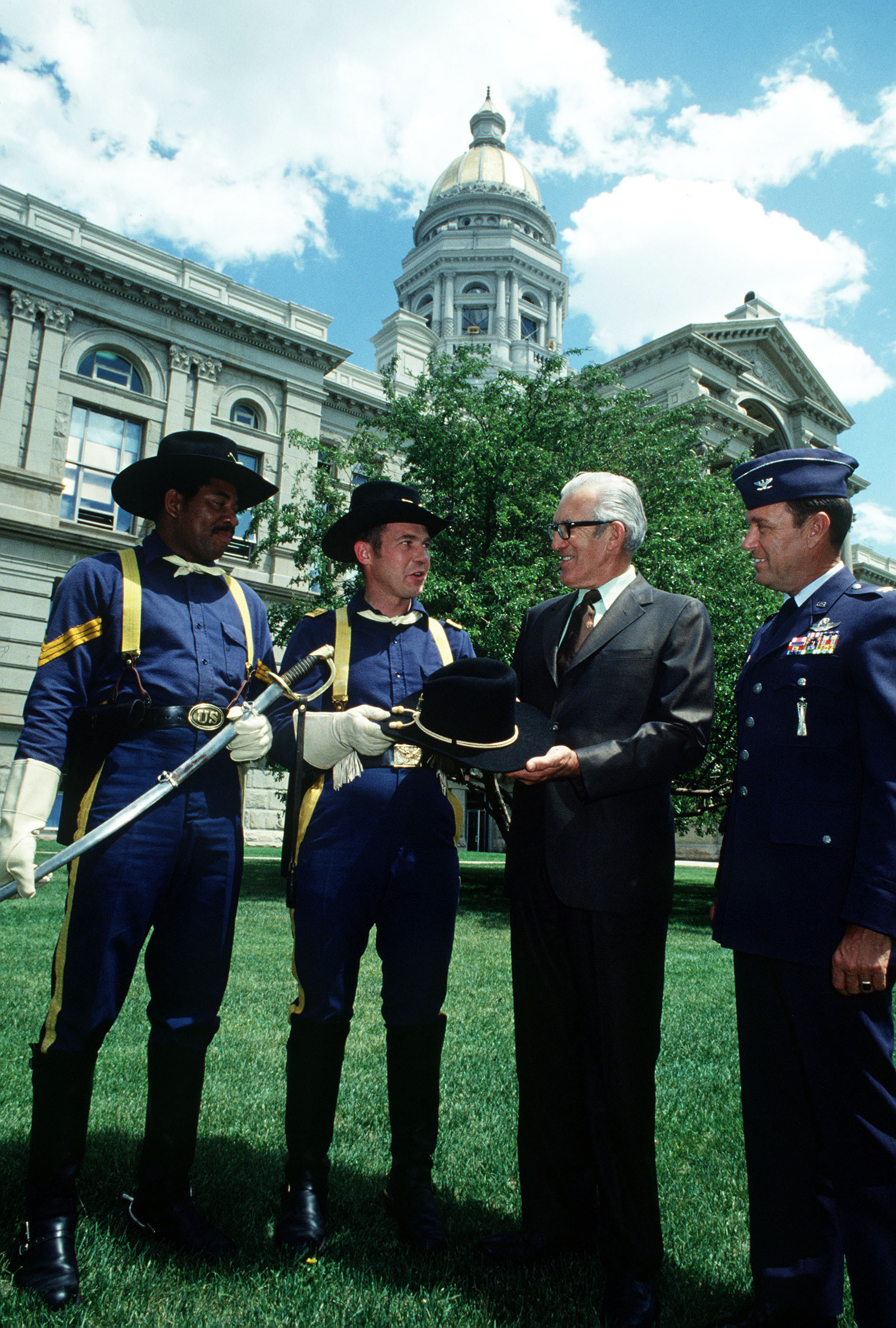
Governor Herschler being presented a hat and saber, June 1977

In September 1981 Cody, Wyoming hosted the Western Governors Association's annual conference of that year and Herschler was selected as president of the Western Conference to serve a one-year term from 1981 to 1982.

In 1985, he commuted the sentences and ordered the releases of Deborah and Richard Janhke Jr., who were both convicted in 1983 of manslaughter in the 1982 death of their abusive father, Richard Jahnke Sr., in Cheyenne and who were the subjects of the television film Right to Kill? In September 1985 he had to file for bankruptcy due to the failure of his 18,500 acre Yellowstone Ranch with almost $6 million in debt.

During his tenure he vetoed more bills than any other governor in Wyoming's history, but none of his vetoes were ever overridden despite the Republicans holding supermajorities in both chambers during most of his tenure. Some of his vetoes were unpopular such as when in 1984 he vetoed a homeowners tax credit program stating that it would subsidize homeowners who did not need it which resulted in the Democrats losing seven seats in the House of Representatives.

The Herschler Cabinet
Office	Name	Term
Governor	Edgar Herschler	1975–1987
Secretary of State	Thyra Thomson	1975–1987
State Auditor	James B. Griffith	1975–1987
State Treasurer	Edwin J. Witzenburger	1975–1979
Shirley Wittler	1979–1983
Stan Smith	1983–1987
Superintendent of Public Instruction	Robert G. Schrader	1975-1979
Lynn Simons	1979–1987

== Later life ==
After leaving office, he returned to practicing law in Cheyenne, and in 1988, multiple people attempted to convince him to run in the Senate election against Malcolm Wallop, but he chose not to. In February 1988, he endorsed and campaigned for Senator Al Gore for the Democratic presidential nomination and on March 5 Wyoming became the first of seven contests that Gore won in the presidential primaries. His successor as governor, Mike Sullivan, supported cigarette tax hikes and smoking bans and was added to Phillip Morris' list of smokers' enemies and in May 1988 Herschler criticized him for it and suggested that municipalities that ban smoking should not be given money from cigarette tax revenues.

In early December 1989, he was hospitalized for cancer treatment and released on December 15, but was re-hospitalized in January 1990. On February 5, 1990, he died in Cheyenne after suffering from cancer at age 71.

== Electoral history ==
Edgar Herschler electoral history

1970 Wyoming at-large Congressional District Democratic primary
Party	Candidate	Votes	%
Democratic	Teno Roncalio	26,309	66.36%
Democratic	Edgar Herschler	11,238	28.34%
Democratic	George W.K. Posvar	2,102	5.30%
Total votes		39,649	100.00%

1974 Wyoming Gubernatorial Democratic primary
Party	Candidate	Votes	%
Democratic	Edgar Herschler	19,997	46.59%
Democratic	Harry Leimback	15,255	35.54%
Democratic	John J. Rooney	7,674	17.88%
Total votes		42,926	100.00%

1974 Wyoming Gubernatorial election
Party	Candidate	Votes	%	±%
Democratic	Edgar Herschler	71,741	55.88%	+18.67%
Republican	Dick Jones	56,645	44.12%	−18.67%
Total votes		128,386	100.00%	

1978 Wyoming Gubernatorial Democratic primary
Party	Candidate	Votes	%	±%
Democratic	Edgar Herschler (incumbent)	28,406	46.59%	+18.69%
Democratic	Margaret McKinstry	15,111	34.72%	
Total votes		43,517	100.00%	

1978 Wyoming Gubernatorial election
Party	Candidate	Votes	%	±%
Democratic	Edgar Herschler (incumbent)	69,972	50.86%	−5.02%
Republican	John C. Ostlund	67,595	49.14%	+5.02%
Total votes		137,567	100.00%	

1982 Wyoming Gubernatorial Democratic primary
Party	Candidate	Votes	%	±%
Democratic	Edgar Herschler (incumbent)	44,396	65.28%	+19.91%
Democratic	Pat McGuire	7,720	14.81%	
Total votes		52,116	100.00%	

1982 Wyoming Gubernatorial election
Party	Candidate	Votes	%	±%
Democratic	Edgar Herschler (incumbent)	106,427	63.14%	+12.28%
Republican	Warren A. Morton	62,128	36.86%	−12.28%
Total votes		168,555	100.00%	

== Legacy ==
Herschler is considered to be Wyoming's most popular governor, being the only governor to serve more than two terms. Herschler Triangle Park in Kemmerer, WY is named after him.

Party political offices
Preceded by John J. Rooney	Democratic nominee for Governor of Wyoming; 1974, 1978, 1982	Succeeded by Mike Sullivan
Political offices
Preceded by Stanley K. Hathaway	Governor of Wyoming; January 6, 1975 – January 5, 1987	Succeeded by Mike Sullivan
