= Thyra Thomson =

American politician

16th Wyoming Secretary of State
- In office January 7, 1963 – January 5, 1987
- Governor: Clifford P. Hansen; Stanley K. Hathaway; Edgar Herschler
- Preceded by: Jack R. Gage
- Succeeded by: Kathy Karpan

Personal details
- Born: Thyra Godfrey; July 30, 1916 Florence, Colorado, U.S.
- Died: June 11, 2013 (aged 96) Cheyenne, Wyoming, U.S.
- Resting place: Arlington National Cemetery
- Party: Republican
- Spouse: Edwin Keith Thomson (m. 1939; died 1960)
- Education: University of Wyoming
- Occupation: Public official

Thyra Godfrey Thomson (July 30, 1916 – June 11, 2013) was an American politician from the U.S. state of Wyoming, who served as a Republican as the Wyoming Secretary of State from 1963 to 1987.

== Background ==
Thyra Godfrey Thomson was born on July 30, 1916, to John and Rose Godfrey in Florence, Colorado, the only girl in a family of seven. Her father, who was a mine superintendent for the Colorado Fuel and Iron Co., died in a mine explosion when she was three. When she was in her teens, her mother brought her and her youngest brother to Cheyenne, Wyoming where she graduated from high school. Thyra went on to earn a BA degree cum laude at the University of Wyoming in 1939, with a major in psychology and minors in sociology and business administration. On August 6, 1939, Thyra married Edwin Keith Thomson from Newcastle who was working on his Juris Doctor and managing the University of Wyoming Bookstore. Thyra received a President's citation for war work at home in Cheyenne while Keith became the youngest infantry battalion commander in the U.S. forces in WWII. Keith returned to Cheyenne in 1945, and he and Thyra became active in statewide politics. In 1954, Keith was elected to Congress and moved Thyra and their three sons—William John, Bruce Godfrey, and Keith Coffey—to the nation's capitol. After three terms in the U.S. house of Representatives, Keith was elected to the U.S. Senate in November 1960, and on December 9, died of a heart attack at the age of 41.

== Political career ==
Upon returning to Wyoming with her sons, Thomson was elected Wyoming Secretary of State in 1962, becoming the first woman to hold that position in the state. She would go on to serve a lengthy career in that office.

Though her name was repeatedly suggested for higher office, Thyra chose to remain Secretary of State and ex-officio lieutenant governor, and she was elected six times by Wyoming voters. When she chose to retire at the end of 1986, she had served 24 years, longer than any state house official in Wyoming's history. Because Wyoming has no lieutenant governor Thomson as secretary of state was acting governor on numerous occasions in the absence of both Republican and Democrat Chief Executives Clifford P. Hansen, Stanley K. Hathaway, and Ed Herschler.

Thyra was lauded by both men and women for speaking up for citizen needs and concerns. As the two-paycheck family became prevalent and large numbers of women began to enter the job market during the 1970s, Thomson led efforts for equal pay for women and recognition of the comparable worth of women's jobs. She was vocal that adequate daycare at affordable prices was essential. Thyra became noted for regulating the sale of new issues of securities so that Wyoming investors had a fair balance between risk and reward, and as a result In 1974 she was elected President of the North American Securities Administrators, encompassing the fifty states, ten Canadian provinces and Mexico. At the request of the federal government Thyra became a member of Unesco's Youth Committee and Health, Education and Welfare's Allied Health Professional Council. The National Conference of Lieutenant Governors three times elected her Vice President, but because her official title was Secretary of State, the NCLG determined that it was inappropriate to name her President.

Internationally, Thyra participated in Wilton Park Conferences in England, sat on the United Kingdom's Marshall Scholarships Committee for four years, and in 1975 was a guest of the Federal Republic of Germany for International Women's Year. In 1983, she traveled to Taiwan promoting Wyoming products at the USA-ROC Trade Forum and was instrumental in the Republic of China's purchase of one-fourth of the State's entire wheat crop in 1984. Seeking further foreign trade Thyra visited Saudi Arabia, Jordan and Egypt as an official guest, winning summer scholarships for Wyoming High school seniors to Petra, Jordan, Gabes, Tunisia and the American University at Cario. In 1985, she led 16 Wyoming businessmen to meet with a Saudi Arabian trade mission in Los Angeles, which proved productive. In 1985, she was a delegate too the North and South American Securities Conference in Cartagena, Colombia. In 1986, she was a delegate to the International Securities Conference in Paris.

Thyra Thomson was called to testify before congressional committees, filled speaking engagements nationwide and television guest appearances. Her writing have been published in textbooks, newspapers and magazines. Thyra was named an International Woman off Distinction By women educators, A Distinguished Alumna By the University of Wyoming, a Woman of Achievement by press women, and was cited by professional and academic honor societies in economics, commerce and education. Noting that she reared and educated three sons, she was cited in "Mothers of Achievement in American History 1776-1976".

== Later life and death ==
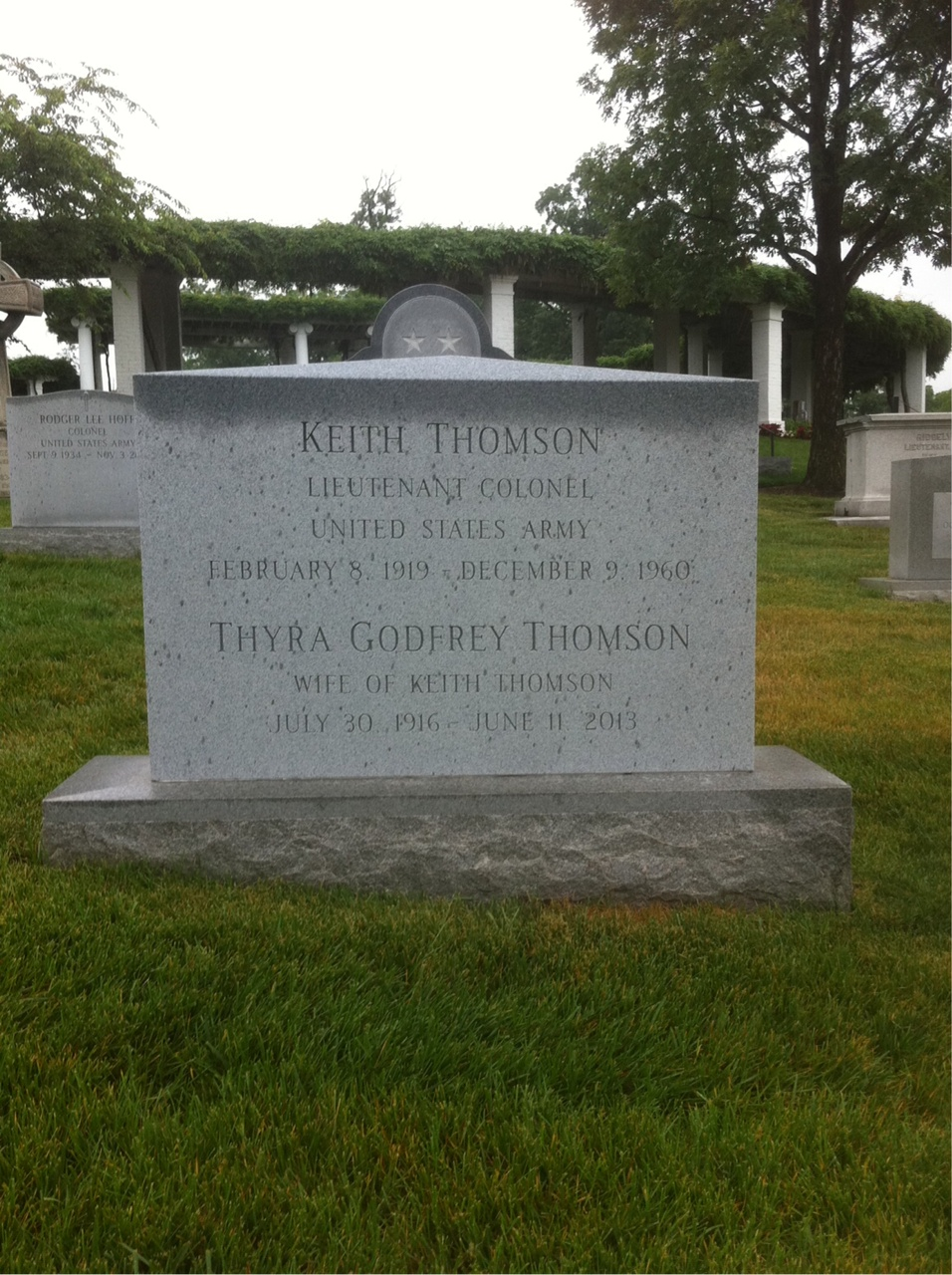
Grave at Arlington National Cemetery

Upon Thyra' retirement on January 5, 1987, many newspapers, including the Los Angeles Times, carried feature stories on her career. Thyra devoted herself to being a fundraiser to good works. She sat on the boards of the Cheyenne Symphony, the Buffalo Bill Center of the West in Cody Wyoming and the University of Wyoming. She also became an enthusiastic golfer. Thyra Thomson died in Cheyenne on June 11, 2013, at the age of 96. Upon her death, Wyoming Secretary of State Max Maxfield issued the following statement: "Wyoming has lost a legendary Wyoming public servant and a vanguard of her time with the passing of Thyra Thomson. Her contributions to her beloved State are immeasurable and significant in the legacy she leaves us all. During her historic twenty four years, as Wyoming's Secretary of State, she touched the lives of citizens throughout the State. Through her dedicated service and statesmanship, Thyra Thomson earned a well-deserved and iconic place in Wyoming's history."

Wyoming Governor Matt Mead said, similarly: "Thyra is one of the most highly regarded political figures in Wyoming's history, for her many accomplishments and also for the length of her tenure in office. I have known her since childhood as a wonderful person with an immense amount of character and an abiding love for Wyoming.... [The] entire State of Wyoming will miss her."

In the services held on June 21, 2013, at the First Presbyterian Church of Cheyenne, the Reverend Diana Hartman likened Thomson to Abigail from the Book of 1 Samuel in the Old Testament. "Of all the famous women in the Old Testament, Abigail might be called the wisest. And while their stories and circumstances are vastly different, Thyra and Abigail demonstrated very similar characteristics as godly women," said Hartman.

Pete Simpson, a retired University of Wyoming historian and administrator and the Republican gubernatorial nominee in 1986, the first year that Thomson no longer appeared on a Wyoming ballot, called Thomson "the queen of Wyoming ... sort of a cross between a Broadway star and a Wyoming cowgirl." Simpson said that he first met Thomson in 1954, when he was twenty-three and his father, Milward L. Simpson, was running for governor. He further described Thomson with two words that he said he could not then easily define: "chutzpah", or raw courage, and "pizzazz" or charisma.

Lynne Cheney, a long-time Thomson friend, recalled her great grace, spirit, vigor, and dancing ability: "Old age has its rough patches too, but I never heard Thyra complain. Even when she was in a wheelchair, her hair was done, her makeup was perfect."

Thomson is interred with her husband at Arlington National Cemetery in Arlington, Virginia.

== See also ==
- List of female secretaries of state in the United States
