= Stanley K. Hathaway =

27th Governor of Wyoming and Secretary of the Interior

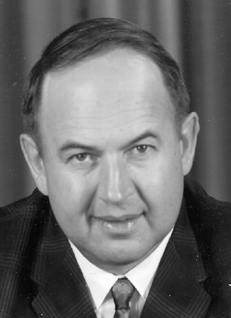

40th United States Secretary of the Interior
- In office June 12, 1975 – October 9, 1975
- President: Gerald Ford
- Preceded by: Rogers Morton
- Succeeded by: Thomas Kleppe

27th Governor of Wyoming
- In office January 2, 1967 – January 6, 1975
- Preceded by: Clifford Hansen
- Succeeded by: Edgar Herschler

Personal details
- Born: Stanley Knapp; July 19, 1924 Osceola, Nebraska, U.S.
- Died: October 4, 2005 (aged 81) Cheyenne, Wyoming, U.S.
- Party: Republican
- Spouse: Bobby Harley (1948–2004)
- Children: 2
- Education: University of Wyoming; University of Nebraska (BA, LLB)

Military service
- Allegiance: United States
- Branch/service: United States Army; Army Air Corps
- Battles/wars: World War II

Stanley Knapp Hathaway (July 19, 1924 – October 4, 2005) was an American politician who served as the 27th governor of Wyoming from 1967 to 1975 and as the 40th United States secretary of the interior under President Gerald Ford from June to October 1975.

== Early life and military service ==
Stanley K. Hathaway, or "Stan" as he was known to most of his friends and associates, was born on July 19, 1924, in Osceola, Nebraska, the fifth of six children born to Lily (Koehler) and Robert C. Knapp. Following his mother's death when he was two years old, he was adopted by a cousin, Velma, and her husband Franklin Earl Hathaway. The couple homesteaded and farmed near Huntley, Wyoming. Stan Hathaway received his early education near there in one-room country schools at Table Mountain and at New Fairview, and then attended Huntley High School, where he graduated as class valedictorian in 1941.

After enrolling briefly at the University of Wyoming, Hathaway left school in early 1942 to enlist in the Army Air Corps following the attack on Pearl Harbor in December, 1941, and was trained as a radio operator and gunner. He was assigned to the Eighth Air Force's 401st Bomb Group, flying B-17 Bombers from England, and took part in 35 combat missions over France and Germany, with his unit often suffering heavy casualties.

On one mission under General Jimmy Doolittle over Leipzig, Germany, Hathaway's plane and crew took heavy enemy fire while making a series of three runs at their target, an oil refinery. After managing to return to base, the crew counted 115 holes in their B-17 from Nazi fighter-plane rounds and anti-aircraft flak. During their entire Leipzig mission under General Doolittle, a total of 56 American planes and more than 500 American troops were lost, and, overall, Hathaway's unit suffered a 50% casualty rate during World War II.

In the fall of 1944, his crew was on a mission to Frankfurt, Germany, when their plane was shot down by anti-aircraft fire. They lost three engines before crash-landing in a field in France, where they were eventually rescued by the French Resistance. For his service during the War, Hathaway was the recipient of the French Croix de Guerre, U.S. Presidential Unit Citations, and five Air Medals.

After his discharge from the Army Air Corps, Hathaway enrolled at the University of Nebraska, where he earned a bachelor's degree. He graduated from the University of Nebraska College of Law in 1950. While there, he met Roberta "Bobby" Harley, and they were married on November 25, 1948. Following his graduation from law school, the couple moved to Torrington, Wyoming, where Hathaway established a law practice, and his wife worked primarily as an English teacher at Torrington Junior High School. They had two daughters, Susan and Sandra.

== Political career ==
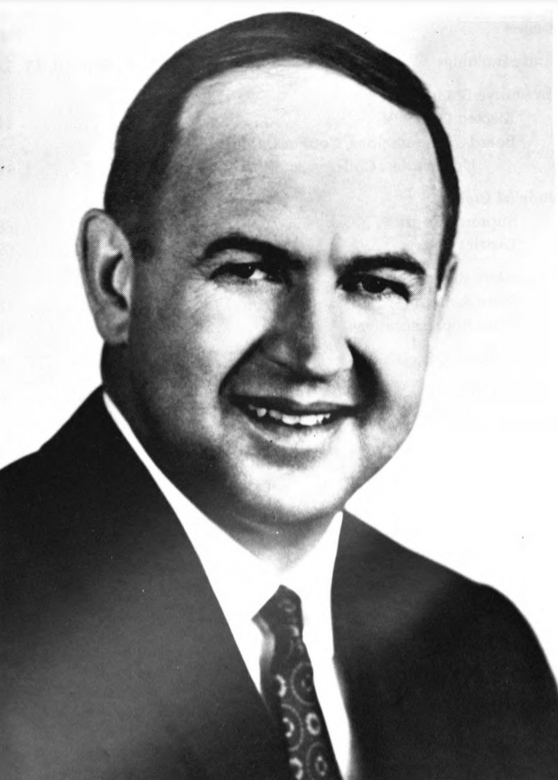
Hathaway as governor.

From 1954 until 1962, Hathaway served in Torrington as prosecuting attorney for Goshen County in southeastern Wyoming. In 1962, he was elected Chairman of the Goshen County Republican Party and Secretary of the Republican State Central Committee. In 1963, he was elected Chairman of the Republican State Central Committee and served for two years on the Republican National Committee.

In 1966, Hathaway was elected governor of Wyoming, and was re-elected to a second term by a large margin in 1970. He declined to run for a third term.

His tenure as governor was marked by significant reorganization of state government and the passage of new environmental laws including the enactment of air and water quality standards, surface mining regulations, and the creation of the Wyoming Department of Environmental Quality. Other new departments created during the Hathaway administration included a Department of Recreation to oversee and improve care of state parks and to provide support for Wyoming's tourism industry, and a Department of Economic Planning and Development to promote economic growth in the state. Wyoming's economy had been in the doldrums when Hathaway was elected governor, but he set in motion a number of initiatives which turned the economy around and saw it booming by the time he left office.

Another major accomplishment during his administration was the enactment of Wyoming's first mineral severance tax in 1969, and of an amendment to the Wyoming State Constitution in 1974 creating a Permanent Mineral Trust Fund, that imposes a 1½% tax on the extraction of minerals in the State, the proceeds of which are deposited in the Trust Fund. The principal of the Trust Fund (more than $2.25 billion by 2005) can never be spent, but the income from it goes into the State's general fund.

Mrs. Hathaway was also very active during her tenure as Wyoming's First Lady in the promotion of many new initiatives. These included the creation of an Arts Council supported entirely by donated funds to promote arts in the state; the establishment of an Indian Council to improve the welfare of Native Americans living on reservations in the State and to build markets for Native American crafts and other products, such as woven rugs and jewelry; and the extensive updating and expansion of government mental health programs and facilities statewide.

During his tenure as governor, Hathaway also served as Chairman of the Western Governor's Conference (whose membership at the time included California Governor and future President Ronald Reagan) and as Chairman of the Interstate Oil Compact Commission, the National Governor's Conference Committee on Natural Resources and Environmental Management, and the Federation of Rocky Mountain States. Among his last appointments in office was that of Richard V. Thomas to the Wyoming Supreme Court, a position that Thomas held from December 1974 until February 2001.

After retiring from the governor's office in 1975, Hathaway was nominated as Secretary of the Interior by President Gerald Ford, taking office following lengthy and at times contentious confirmation hearings. During his brief tenure at the Department of the Interior, he was responsible for moving the federal coal leasing program forward. Health issues, however, resulted in his resignation as the Interior Secretary later that year, after which the Hathaways returned to Wyoming.

== Later years and death ==
After returning to Wyoming in October 1975, Hathaway co-founded the law firm of Hathaway, Speight and Kunz in Cheyenne, and returned to the practice of law. He also served on the Board of directors of the PacifiCorp, of the Nerco, Inc., of the First Wyoming Bank, and of the Apache Corporation, and was named an Emeritus Member of the University of Wyoming's Ruckelshaus Institute for Environment and Natural Resources.

In 2003, Wyoming Governor Dave Freudenthal awarded the "Governor's Art Award for Excellence in the Arts" to Stan and Bobby Hathaway. In 2005, the Wyoming Legislature authorized $400 million for a "Hathaway Student Scholarship Endowment Account". Under this program, Wyoming high school graduates who qualify can receive a Hathaway Scholarship for the full cost of tuition and fees at the University of Wyoming, or for attendance at any community college in Wyoming.

Hathaway died in Cheyenne, Wyoming, following a lengthy illness, on October 4, 2005, having been preceded in death by his wife Bobby in 2004. The Hathaways are interred in Valley View Cemetery in Torrington, Wyoming.

Following his death, both houses of the Wyoming Legislature in 2006 unanimously passed a Joint Resolution memorializing Governor Hathaway as "one of Wyoming's greatest natural resources".

Party political offices
Preceded by Clifford Hansen	Republican nominee for Governor of Wyoming; 1966, 1970	Succeeded by Dick Jones
Political offices
Preceded by Clifford Hansen	Governor of Wyoming; 1967–1975	Succeeded by Edgar Herschler
Preceded by Rogers Morton	United States Secretary of the Interior; 1975	Succeeded by Thomas S. Kleppe
