= Wisconsin Rapids, Wisconsin =

- City
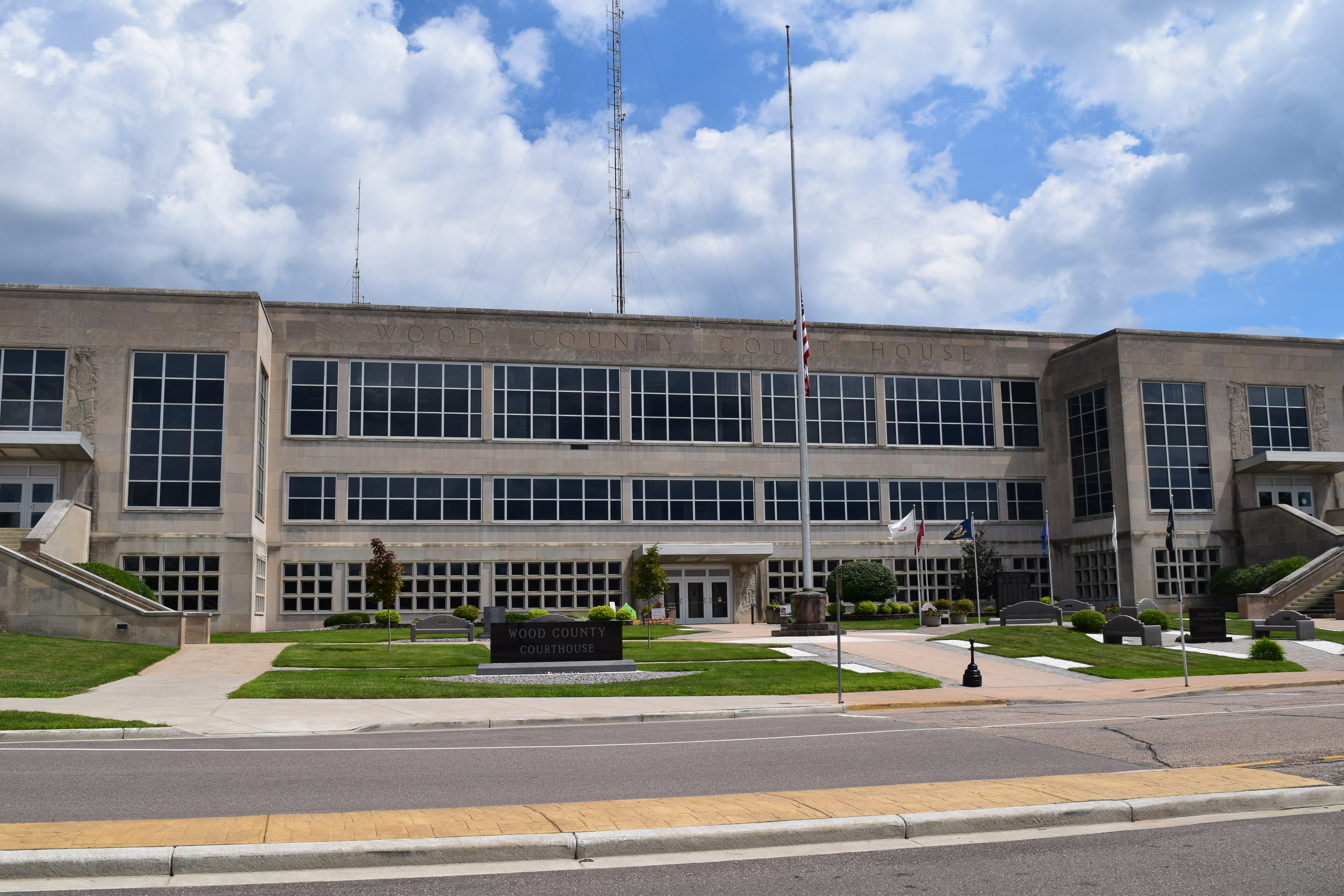
- Wood County Courthouse

- Location of Wisconsin Rapids, Wisconsin

- Location within Wisconsin Location within the United States
- Coordinates: 44°23′0.87″N 89°49′2.45″W
- Country: United States
- State: Wisconsin
- County: Wood
- Founded: 1900
- Incorporated: April 6, 1868

Government
  - Mayor: Matt Zacher

Area
  - City: 14.795 sq mi (38.319 km^{2})
  - Land: 13.902 sq mi (36.005 km^{2})
  - Water: 0.893 sq mi (2.314 km^{2})
- Elevation: 1,027 ft (313 m)

Population (2020)
  - City: 18,877
  - Estimate (2023): 18,670
  - Density: 1,343.7/sq mi (518.81/km^{2})
  - Urban: 29,550
  - Metro: 73,939
- Time zone: UTC–6 (Central (CST))
  - Summer (DST): UTC–5 (CDT)
- ZIP Codes: 54494, 54495
- Area codes: 715 and 534
- FIPS code: 55-88200
- GNIS feature ID: 1576906
- Website: www.wirapids.gov

Wisconsin Rapids is a city in and the county seat of Wood County, Wisconsin, United States, along the Wisconsin River. The population was 18,877 at the 2020 census. It is a principal city of the Marshfield–Wisconsin Rapids micropolitan statistical area, which includes all of Wood County and had a population of 74,207 in 2020.

The city was established in the late 1830s as the series of rapids along the Wisconsin River provided good sites for water-driven sawmills, and nearby forests held pine lumber to be sawed and floated down the river. After the lumber dwindled, the waterpower drove electric generators and various other enterprises–particularly paper mills.

== History ==
=== Establishment ===
The Menominee claimed the big rapids in the forest prior to European settlement, with Ojibwe and Ho-Chunk lands nearby. They called the place "Ah-dah-wah-gam" meaning "Two-sided Rapids" because the rapids were split by a large chunk of rock. In 1836, the Menominee ceded this land, along with more land to the east, to the U.S. in the Treaty of the Cedars. This particular land cession was a strip spanning three miles on either side of the Wisconsin River, starting at Point Basse and reaching 48 miles (77 km) upstream to Big Bull Falls – the future site of Wausau. The U.S. negotiators pressed the Menominee for this strip before the surrounding lands because it held prime pine timber and was within easy reach of the river.

In 1832, Daniel Whitney had built a sawmill 10 miles (16 km) downstream, across from modern Nekoosa. Whitney's operation demonstrated the feasibility of rafting lumber to markets downstream. When the treaty of 1836 made the strip along the Wisconsin River available, lumbermen rushed in exploring for mill sites, and by 1839 (when Wisconsin was still a territory) two water-powered sawmills were running at the future Wisconsin Rapids, when a surveyor described the site as a "succession of rapids & chutes called the Grand Rapids", with two "extensive lumbering establishments thereon owned by Bloomer, Chamberlain, Adams, Strong, Hill & others, now in operation."

The first house in Rapids was a small log cabin built by H. McCutcheon, a cook for Strong and Bloomer's mill. The second came soon after when Nelson Strong built a frame house for himself with boards sawed at his mill - the first frame house in Rapids, built in 1838. Rapids' first church services were conducted by visiting Catholic priests in 1837. In 1842 a Methodist missionary J.S. Hurlburt began ministering too, visiting homes by foot or horseback. He also started a primary school in a log cabin in the early 1840s. The first hotel came in 1843 and the first blacksmith shop in 1844. A post office named Grand Rapids opened in 1845, with mail carried in once a week. Pioneer J.L. Cotey later wrote an account of the early sawmill town as it stood in 1846. He described a community of "130 males and 17 females," with businesses along a slough crossed by a temporary slab bridge, frame homes and log houses and barns, picturesque pine trees, a sawmill with two up-and-down saws, boarding houses and saloons for the workers at the mills, and a stopping place for loggers headed upstream. Across the river on the west side was another sawmill, three frame houses for the men who worked in the sawmill, two shingle shanties, and a block house. At that time supplies were hauled overland to Rapids by ox and wagon from Galena, which took three weeks. (The Jones reference gives Cotey's full account.)

The business of this ramshackle wilderness outpost was lumber. In the 6-mile strip along the river, lumberjacks working from winter logging camps felled the prized pine trees. They limbed the trees and cut them into 12 to 18-foot logs, then skidded the logs with oxen and horses to rivers and stream banks where they were stored until spring. During spring floods the logs were driven downstream, and, if all went well, captured in booms of the sawmills at Grand Rapids. The sawmills pulled the logs in and sawed them into boards. Some of the boards went into drying piles for local use, but the majority were destined for distant markets like Portage, Dubuque, and St. Louis. These were stacked along the river, then bound into 16 by 16-foot "cribs" of boards. When the river was running well (generally spring) six or seven of these cribs were joined into a "rapids piece" - a 100-foot long, flexible raft suited to running the rocky rapids of the upper Wisconsin River. Of those rapids, Grand Rapids was one of the most dangerous. Before today's placid, flat reservoir, the river surged through a series of rapids a mile long, and rafts had to run when the water was high. In early years that passage was aided by wing dams to focus the current; in later years dams across the river provided chutes for the rafts to plunge down, with spectators watching from the bank. The rafts that succeeded in passing the rapids regrouped at Point Basse and joined three of the rapids-piece rafts side by side into a "Wisconsin raft" for the rest of the Wisconsin River, which was less turbulent. Then at the Mississippi the Wisconsin rafts were joined into huge "Mississippi rafts" for the final leg to Dubuque or St. Louis.

In 1848 another treaty with Indians opened most of northern Wisconsin to loggers and settlers, which allowed access to much more timber outside the three-mile strip along the river. In 1856 Grand Rapids became the county seat of the new Wood County when it was split out of Portage County. The town was growing. A promotional booklet in 1857 reported Grand Rapids' population at about 1,000. It reported eight sawmills from Grand Rapids down to Point Basse, plus six steam-powered mills - all producing 19 million board feet of lumber per year, plus around 42 million shingles. Rapids consisted of 187 buildings including homes and a Catholic church, two public schools, a drug store, five general stores, six variety stores, five taverns (probably meaning inns), two saloons, two lawyers, three blacksmiths, two carpenter shops, two shoe shops, a wagonmakers' shop, two tailors, a cabinet maker, a bakery, two lawyers and two doctors. In 1857 the first newspaper began publication - the Wood County Reporter. Mrs. Clarice Arpin later gave her impression of the town when she arrived about 1859: "a rough lumbering town, filled with lumberjacks who engaged in many drunken brawls, and Indians, who when they had an over-supply of firewater yelled and danced in the middle of the streets."

The first plat of part of the Rapids had been made in 1847, with others following. Growth slowed during the American Civil War, when some of the workers left to fight in the Union Army. A bad flood in 1864 and a fire in the business district in 1865 were other setbacks. In 1869 Grand Rapids incorporated as a city. Its first order of business was to require a license to sell liquor. Shortly after, city officials were elected, including Dr. G.F. Witter to "doctor city poor for the sum of $75 per year." A ban on selling liquor on Sunday was passed, and a ban on running hogs loose in the city.

Centralia, a somewhat separate community on the west side of the river, had been developing too. George Kline Sr. had built a sawmill there around 1839. By 1855 Centralia had two sawmills, a gristmill, a general store, a tavern, and houses and shacks. In the 1850s a ferry carried people across the river between Centralia and Grand Rapids. In the 1860s a wooden bridge was added across the river. A "town of Centralia" was formalized in 1856, perhaps to avoid annexation by Grand Rapids. In 1874 Centralia was incorporated as a city.

=== Late 19th century ===
The railroad boom burst upon Rapids in the 1870s. In 1870 the nearest railroad was at New Lisbon, with mail carried from there daily by evening stage. In 1872 the Green Bay and Lake Pepin Railroad reached Rapids itself, heading west. In 1873 the Wisconsin Valley Railway arrived from Tomah. The Port Edwards, Centralia & Northern was built by local interests in 1890, and the Chicago & Northwestern line to Marshfield in 1901.

With the arrival of the railroads, the transport of lumber from the area began to shift from the unpredictable and dangerous river to more reliable railcars, which could carry the lumber in more directions than downstream. The last rafts of lumber passed through in 1888, from the sawmill at Biron heading downriver for St. Louis.

In June 1880 an unusually high flood of the river forced many businesses to evacuate their stock to higher ground, and in some cases tie buildings down with ropes. Nevertheless, several buildings were swept into the river and one hardware store partner drowned while trying to save his goods. By that year Grand Rapids had 1,367 people and Centralia 800. As pine timber ran out in the vicinity of Grand Rapids, manufacturers took root in Centralia. Around 1880, the big ones were Robb's machine shops, Mackinnon & Griffith's hub and spoke factory, Wharton Brothers' planing mill, Haertel's chair factory, Bremmer's machine shop and foundry, a flouring mill, Moore's wagon works, and Lyon Bros. shingle works. In 1887 the first pulp mill was built, which would develop into Centralia Pulp and Paper.

Paper-making was a big new industry for Rapids. Paper had been made over in the Fox River valley for decades, but not on the Wisconsin River. Around 1885 some of the mills at Rapids - formerly sawmills and gristmills - began converting to pulp-grinding and paper-making. By 1902, after many acquisitions, J.D. Witter and Nels Johnson had organized the many mills and water rights under one corporation - Consolidated Water Power Company. They decided to focus their resources on paper-making. The founders both died shortly after, leaving Witter's son-in-law George Mead to manage the new enterprise. The main plant began with 14 pulp-grinders and two papermaking machines, producing 50 tons of paper per day.

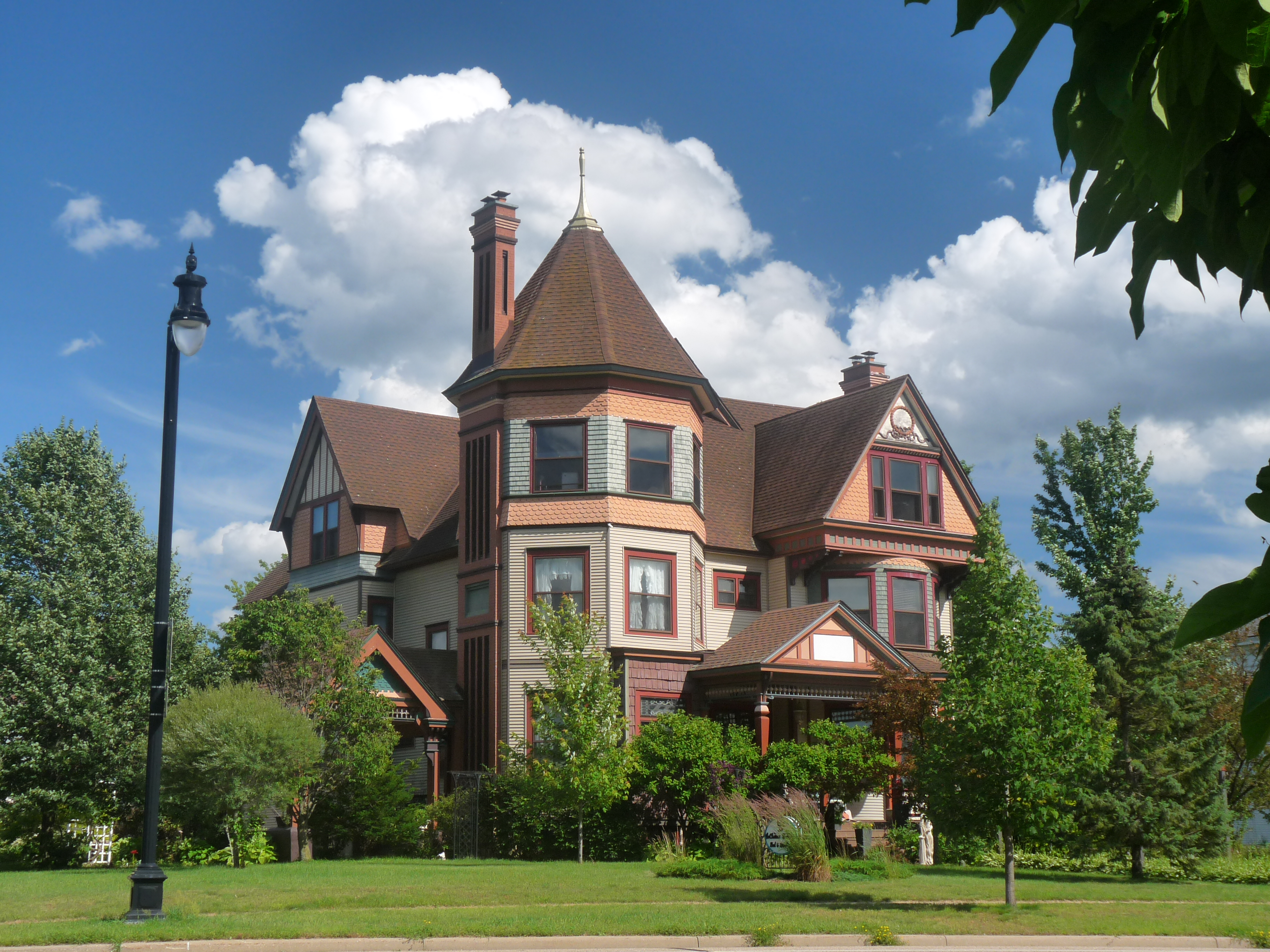
John B. Arpin house, 1890

Other diversification of the industrial base away from lumber occurred from 1880 to 1920, including the Grand Rapids Brick Company, the Grand Rapids Foundry Co., Wisconsin Ice Machine Co., Prentiss-Wabers Stove Co., Oberback Brothers furniture company, Badger Box & Lumber, Grand Rapids Brewing, Samson Canning, Citizens Factory Company (a pickling co-op), Blommer Ice Cream, and Chambers Creamery. These last four resulted from farmers settling in the surrounding cut-over lands, which were also transitioning from the logging era.

Modern public services began to take shape around the turn of the century. Fire departments were formalized in Centralia in 1887 and in Rapids the following year. At this time that meant a hook-and-ladder, a chemical fire suppression apparatus, and a steam pumping engine. The T.B. Scott Library was started in 1889 with a donation from one of the city's pioneers. In 1890 John Arpin installed an electric dynamo in his home - the first electric service in Rapids. In 1894 Mack and Spencer added a generator at their dam which offered electricity to the public. The Wood County Telephone Company was a member-owned cooperative started in 1895.

=== 20th century to present ===
In 1900 the cities of Grand Rapids and Centralia merged into one city named Grand Rapids. Prior to the merger, Grand Rapids had a population of 1,702 and Centralia 1,425. The name of the merged city was changed in 1920 to Wisconsin Rapids, after years of mail and other goods being misdirected to the much better known Grand Rapids, Michigan. In 1904 a small purpose-built hospital opened, to take over from the previous location over the Otto drug store; it was replaced in 1916 by the first Riverside Hospital - a 30-bed brick facility. Parks along the river began development with Lyon Park in 1909. The same year, a private "street railroad" company was organized, which ran a street car line eight miles from the west side of Rapids down to Port Edwards and Nekoosa. To lure riders, it built a dance pavilion north of Nekoosa. A municipal pool was built in 1913, pushed by John Arpin in response to regular drownings of swimmers in the river.

The city added an airport in 1928. During the Great Depression, Consolidated Papers reduced its work week to four days to share existing work across more workers and avoid layoffs. Consolidated also began producing coated papers more efficiently, with their output used to print Life Magazine.

During World War II, many locals volunteered to fight overseas, and some died. Back in Rapids, people grew victory gardens, collected scrap metal for the war effort, and rationed coffee and petroleum. Consolidated adapted to manufacture plastic aircraft materials, and Harvard Clothing made coats for the army.

In the 1970s corner groceries were disappearing, replaced by supermarkets. A number of old properties on the west side were torn down and replaced with the new Rapids Mall. The Riverview Expressway was built.

In the 1980s, Consolidated was the largest producer of enamel papers in the world and a Fortune 500 company. But after those glory years, paper use dropped as TV and computer screens replaced magazines and newspapers. Starting in 2000, Consolidated was bought and then sold by outside companies that eventually filed for bankruptcy, leading to closure of the mill in Rapids in 2020. Remaining large employers are Riverview Hospital and Renaissance Learning.

== Geography ==
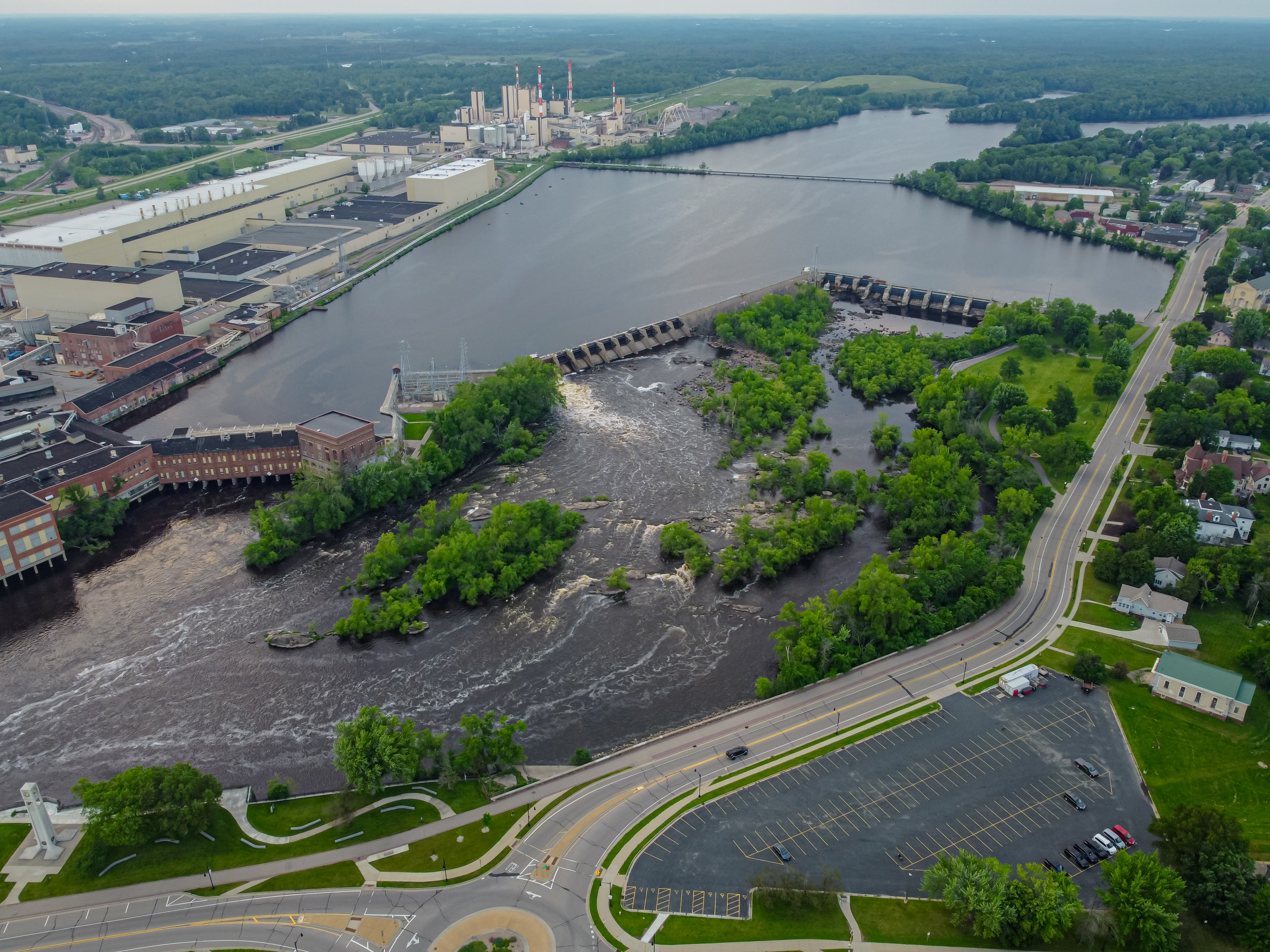
Wisconsin Rapids dam on the Wisconsin River

Wisconsin Rapids is located at 44°23′0.87″N 89°49′2.45″W (44.3835763, -89.8173466).

According to the United States Census Bureau, the city has a total area of 14.795 square miles (38.32 km^{2}), of which 13.902 square miles (36.01 km^{2}) is land and 0.893 square miles (2.31 km^{2}) is water.

== Demographics ==
Historical population
Census	Pop.	Note	%±
1870	1,115		—
1880	1,350		21.1%
1890	1,702		26.1%
1900	4,493		164.0%
1910	6,521		45.1%
1920	7,243		11.1%
1930	8,726		20.5%
1940	11,416		30.8%
1950	13,496		18.2%
1960	15,042		11.5%
1970	18,587		23.6%
1980	17,995		−3.2%
1990	18,245		1.4%
2000	18,435		1.0%
2010	18,367		−0.4%
2020	18,877		2.8%
2023 (est.)	18,670		−1.1%
U.S. Decennial Census; 2020 Census

=== Racial and ethnic composition ===
Wisconsin Rapids, Wisconsin – racial and ethnic composition Note: the US Census treats Hispanic/Latino as an ethnic category. This table excludes Latinos from the racial categories and assigns them to a separate category. Hispanics/Latinos may be of any race.
Race / ethnicity (NH = non-Hispanic)	Pop. 2000	Pop. 2010	Pop. 2020	% 2000	% 2010	% 2020
White alone (NH)	17,195	16,646	16,184	93.27%	90.63%	85.73%
Black or African American alone (NH)	63	132	235	0.34%	0.72%	1.24%
Native American or Alaska Native alone (NH)	141	164	147	0.76%	0.89%	0.78%
Asian alone (NH)	638	664	661	3.46%	3.62%	3.50%
Pacific Islander alone (NH)	2	3	5	0.01%	0.02%	0.03%
Other race alone (NH)	7	13	55	0.04%	0.07%	0.29%
Mixed race or multiracial (NH)	147	210	723	0.80%	1.14%	3.83%
Hispanic or Latino (any race)	242	535	867	1.31%	2.91%	4.59%
Total	18,435	18,367	18,877	100.00%	100.00%	100.00%

=== 2020 census ===
As of the 2020 census, there were 18,877 people and 4,465 families residing in the city. The median age was 41.9 years. 21.1% of residents were under the age of 18, 5.2% were under 5 years of age, and 22.3% were 65 years of age or older. For every 100 females, there were 91.3 males, and for every 100 females age 18 and over there were 88.7 males age 18 and over. The gender makeup of the city was 45.3% male and 54.7% female.

The population density was 1,360.2 inhabitants per square mile (525.2/km^{2}). There were 9,265 housing units at an average density of 667.6 per square mile (257.8/km^{2}). Of all housing units, 6.6% were vacant. The homeowner vacancy rate was 1.7% and the rental vacancy rate was 8.3%.

98.2% of residents lived in urban areas, while 1.8% lived in rural areas.

There were 8,655 households in Wisconsin Rapids, of which 23.5% had children under the age of 18 living in them. Of all households, 33.7% were married-couple households, 22.7% were households with a male householder and no spouse or partner present, and 33.9% were households with a female householder and no spouse or partner present. About 40.7% of all households were made up of individuals and 18.9% had someone living alone who was 65 years of age or older.

=== 2022 American Community Survey ===
As of the 2022 American Community Survey, there are 8,527 estimated households in Wisconsin Rapids with an average of 2.15 persons per household. The city has a median household income of $51,186. Approximately 14.3% of the city's population lives at or below the poverty line. Wisconsin Rapids has an estimated 63.2% employment rate, with 16.3% of the population holding a bachelor's degree or higher and 91.4% holding a high school diploma.

=== 2010 census ===
As of the 2010 census, there were 18,367 people, 8,296 households, and 4,626 families residing in the city. The population density was 1,328.7 inhabitants per square mile (513.0/km^{2}). There were 8,972 housing units at an average density of 649.2 per square mile (250.7/km^{2}). The racial makeup of the city was % White, % African American, % Native American, % Asian, % Pacific Islander, % from some other races and % from two or more races. Hispanic or Latino people of any race were 2.91% of the population.

The racial makeup of the city was 92.2% White, 0.7% African American, 1.0% Native American, 3.7% Asian, 0.9% from other races, and 1.5% from two or more races.

There were 8,296 households, of which 27.1% had children under the age of 18 living with them, 39.1% were married couples living together, 11.9% had a female householder with no husband present, 4.8% had a male householder with no wife present, and 44.2% were non-families. 38.7% of all households were made up of individuals, and 16.8% had someone living alone who was 65 years of age or older. The average household size was 2.17 and the average family size was 2.87.

The median age in the city was 41.1 years. 22.8% of residents were under the age of 18; 8.5% were between the ages of 18 and 24; 23.3% were from 25 to 44; 25.5% were from 45 to 64; and 19.8% were 65 years of age or older. The gender makeup of the city was 47.8% male and 52.2% female.

=== 2000 census ===
As of the 2000 census, there were 18,435 people, 7,970 households, and 4,782 families residing in the city. The population density was 1,390.0 inhabitants per square mile (536.7/km^{2}). There were 8,426 housing units at an average density of 635.3 per square mile (245.3/km^{2}). The racial makeup of the city was 94.04% White, 0.34% African American, 0.80% Native American, 3.46% Asian, 0.02% Pacific Islander, 0.37% from some other races and % from two or more races. Hispanic or Latino people of any race were 1.31% of the population.

There were 7,970 households, out of which 28.0% had children under the age of 18 living with them, 46.0% were married couples living together, 10.6% had a female householder with no husband present, and 40.0% were non-families. 34.8% of all households were made up of individuals, and 16.0% had someone living alone who was 65 years of age or older. The average household size was 2.26 and the average family size was 2.93.

In the city, the population was spread out, with 24.7% under the age of 18, 8.5% from 18 to 24, 27.5% from 25 to 44, 19.8% from 45 to 64, and 19.4% who were 65 years of age or older. The median age was 38 years. For every 100 females, there were 90.1 males. For every 100 females age 18 and over, there were 86.2 males.

The median income for a household in the city was $34,956, and the median income for a family was $43,594. Males had a median income of $36,098 versus $22,466 for females. The per capita income for the city was $17,723. About 7.0% of families and 9.1% of the population were below the poverty line, including 12.5% of those under age 18 and 7.2% of those age 65 or over.

== Economy ==
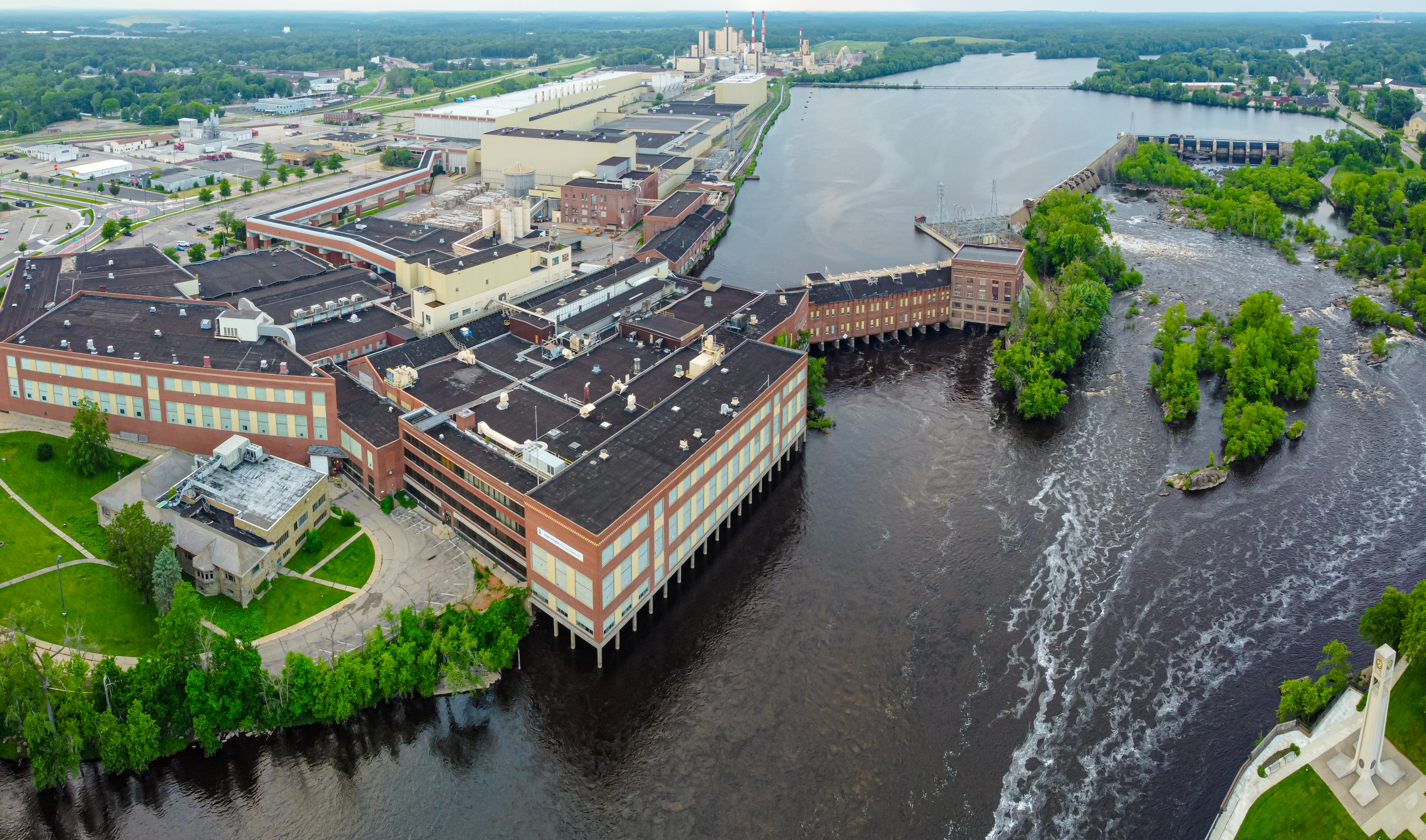
Wisconsin Rapids paper mill

Known for its papermaking history, Wisconsin Rapids is also an important location for the cranberry industry. Wisconsin Rapids is the corporate home of the international educational software company, Renaissance Learning.

From its founding in 1894, Wisconsin Rapids was home to the corporate headquarters of Consolidated Papers, Inc, which was acquired by the Finnish company Stora Enso in early-2000. In 2007, NewPage acquired the paper production facility. In 2015, Verso Corporation acquired the mill. Verso continued its presence in the area with a paper mill that houses two paper machines and a kraft pulp mill. In June 2020, Verso announced the closing of their paper mill for at least two months, with the resulting loss of 900 jobs. After being closed for 2 years, Billerud (also known as BillerudKorsnäs) acquired with Verso in 2022. Since the closing in 2020, the only use of the property has been a lease with Sonoco, another paper manufacturer, which operates in a secondary building of the plant.

== Arts and culture ==
There are two active museums, the South Wood County Historical Corporation Museum, and the Alexander House, both of which are housed in historical family homes. The South Wood County Historical Corporation Museum houses multiple exhibits covering the history of the South Wood County area, as well as the artwork of animator Myron "Grim" Natwick. The building is the former Witter family home, Shadowlawn. The Alexander House is a museum to the history of the Nekoosa Edwards Paper Company (NEPCO) and also hosts art exhibitions. The building is the former home of the Alexander Family, which ran the Nekoosa Edwards Paper Company. The city is also home to the Mead family mansion, which housed the Wisconsin River Papermaking Museum. Operation as a museum ceased in 2020 due to COVID-19 restrictions, and it never reopened.

There is a prairie chicken sanctuary at the Buena Vista Wildlife Reservation, and every year the Prairie Chicken Festival is held. The Souper Snow Sculpture Spectacular that takes place every February is one of the largest snow sculpture competitions in the country by numbers of sculptures. The FRM Music Festival happens every June, as does the Cranberry Blossom Festival. The Grand Affair Arts Festival takes place in September of each year.

== Parks and recreation ==
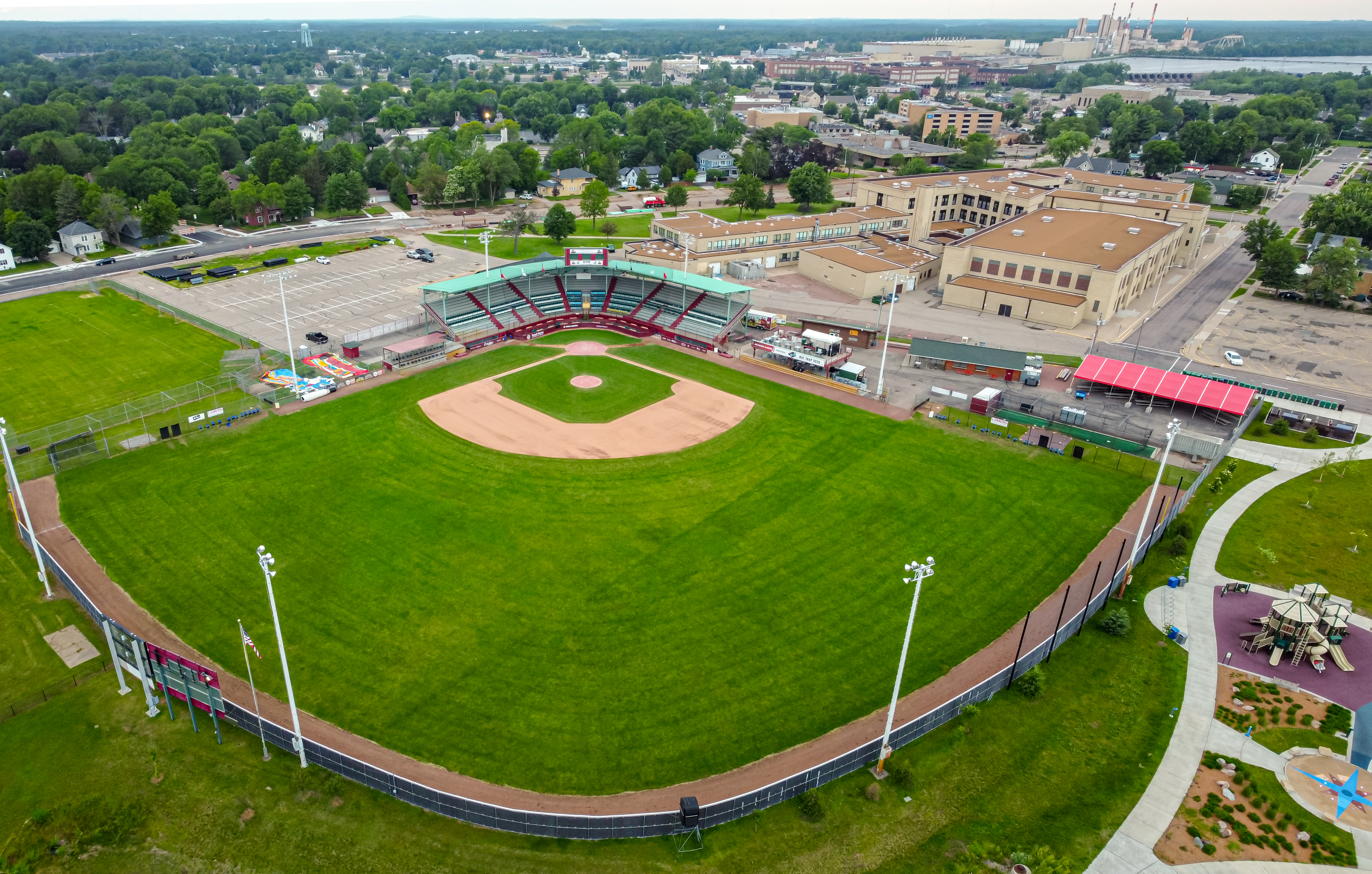
Witter Field is home to the Wisconsin Rapids Rafters of the Northwoods League

Wisconsin Rapids has several local parks, including Robinson Park, Gaynor Park, and Lyon Park. There is also a skate park. The state water-skiing championships are held at Lake Wazeecha every year and the national BMX Bandit cycling championships are held at the Central Wisconsin BMX velodrome. The state boys and girls cross country championships have been held in Wisconsin Rapids since 1988 with the exception of 2020.

The Wisconsin Rapids Aquatic Center opened in July 2020 and features several pools and other recreational facilities including a tennis court, pickleball courts, an adventure playground, ice-skating rink, and splash pad.

There is a municipal zoo which is free to enter and operated during the summer only.

The Wisconsin Rapids Riverkings are a hockey team that is a member of the United States Premier Hockey League and won the Midwest Elite Championship in the 2016–2017 season. The Riverkings currently play their home games at the South Wood County Recreation Center. The Wisconsin Rapids Rafters are a collegiate summer baseball team formed in 2010 who are a member of the Northwoods League. The Rafters won the league championship in 2016. They currently play their home games at Witter Field.

== Education ==
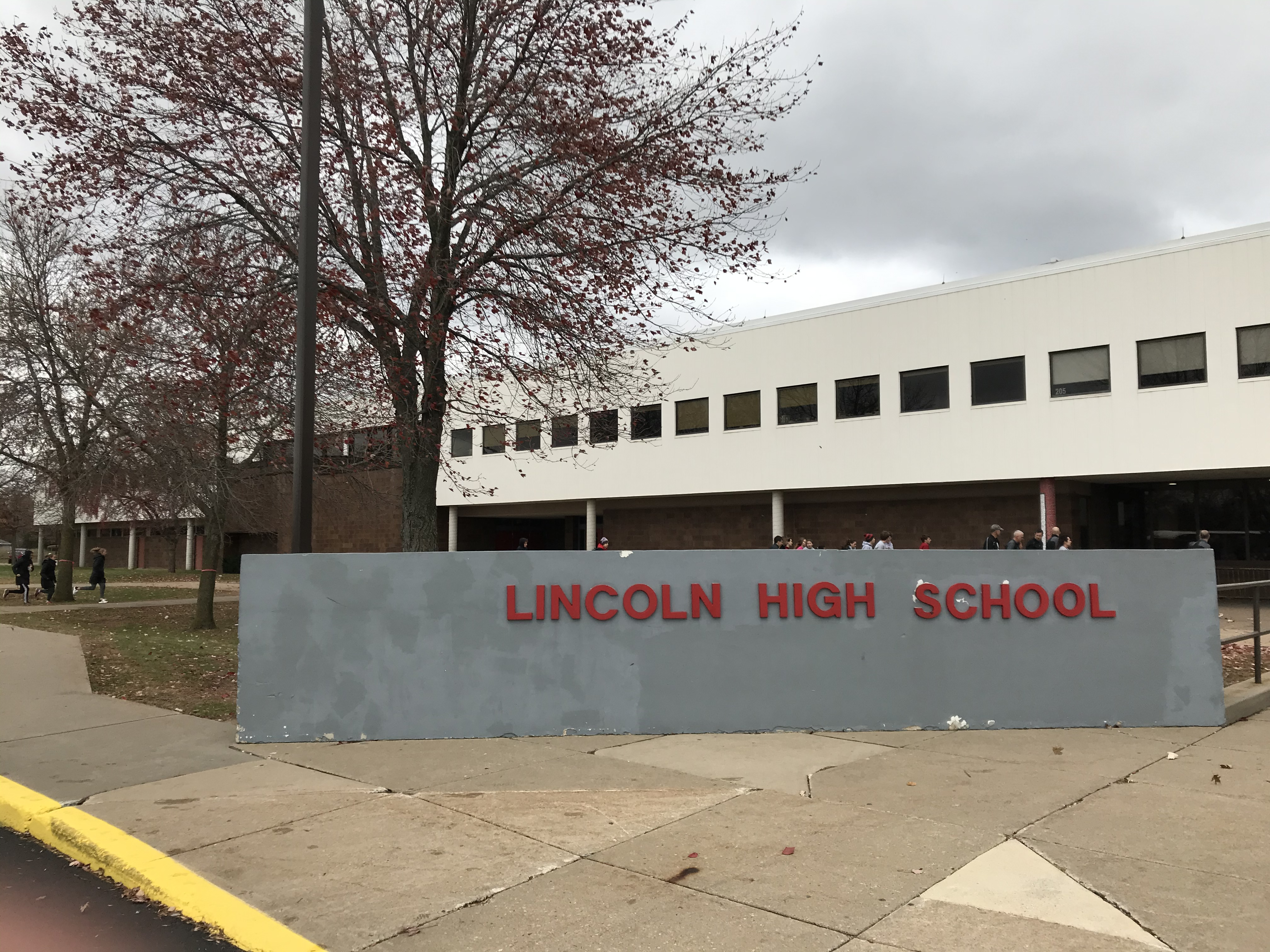
Lincoln High School

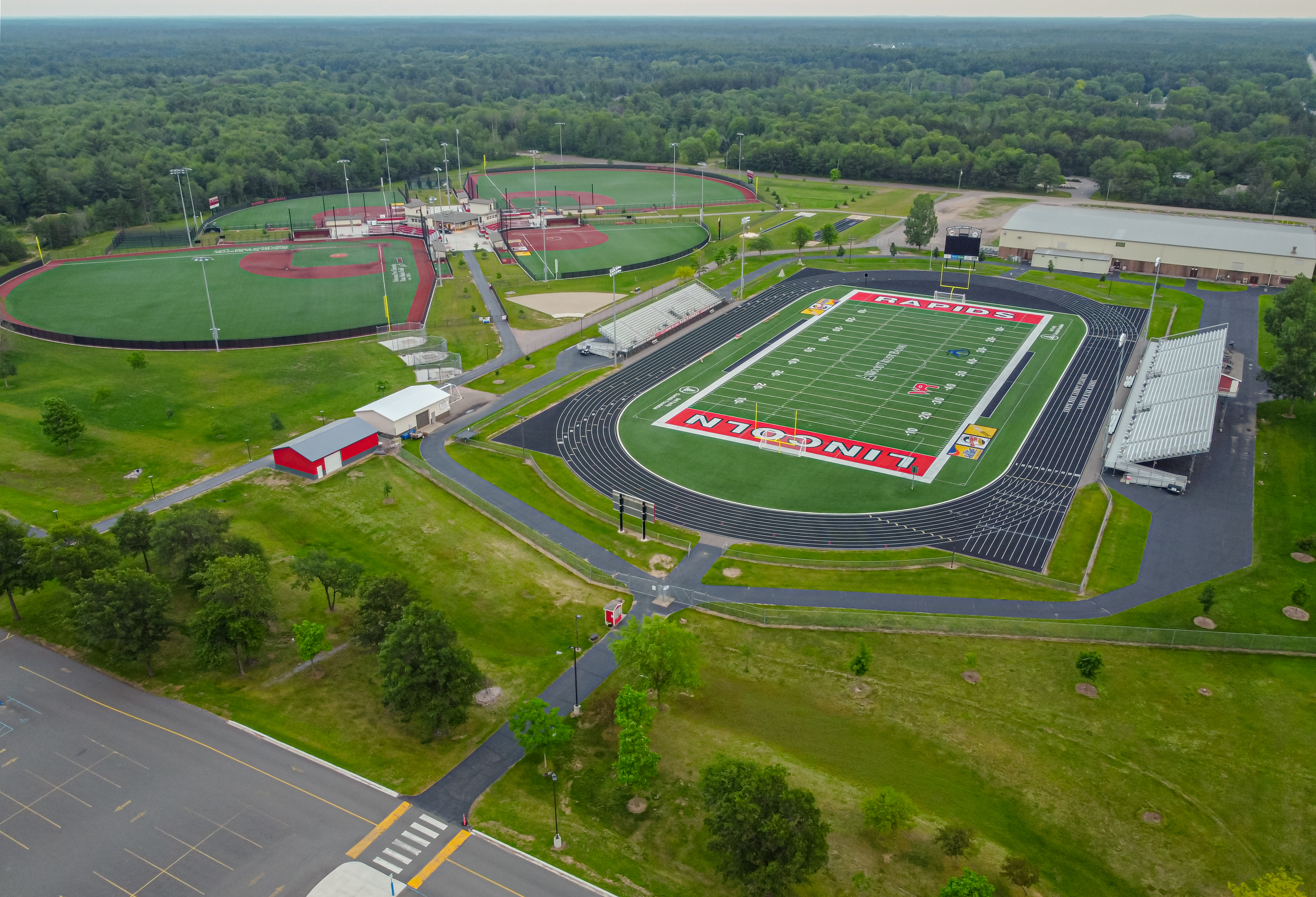
Lincoln High School athletic fields

Wisconsin Rapids is served by Wisconsin Rapids Public Schools. Lincoln High School is the local public high school, serving grades 9 through 12. Assumption High School is a private Catholic high school. River Cities High School is an alternative to the local high schools. The city has two middle schools, Wisconsin Rapids Area Middle School (grades 6–8) and Central Oaks (Virtual) Academy (6–8). East Junior High was a junior high school for grades 8–9 before it closed after the 2017–2018 school year.

Immanuel Lutheran School (4K-8th grade) is a Missouri Synod lutheran school that has won multiple national education awards. Good Shepherd Lutheran School (1–8th grade) and St. Paul's Lutheran School (3K–8th grade) are two grade schools of the Wisconsin Evangelical Lutheran Synod in Wisconsin Rapids.

Mid-State Technical College, which has a campus in the city, offers vocational diplomas, and Lakeland University offers qualifications in academic subjects.

McMillan Memorial Library serves Wisconsin Rapids and southern Wood County. McMillan was a Finalist for the 2019 National Medal for Museum and Library Service.

== Media ==
Both the Wisconsin Rapids Daily Tribune, a daily newspaper founded in 1920, and the Wisconsin Rapids City-Times, a daily online newspaper launched in 2013, serve the community. WRCM is a public, educational, and government access (PEG) broadcast on cable TV.

Radio stations based in Wisconsin Rapids include:

- WFHR 1320 kHz, News/talk Radio – Established November 1940 – Originally broadcasting at 1340 kHz
- Country Legends 24/7 105.5Mhz WIRI – 1980s, 1990s, and contemporary. Established as KZZA in 2003, later WRCW.
- Hot 96-7 96.7Mhz WHTQ Top 40 – Established as WYTE in 1985, later WLJY
- WIFC 95.5Mhz – CHR – Established 1969 – Formerly WSAU-FM
- WDEZ 101.9Mhz Country & western – Established as WRIG-FM in 1964
- Y106.5 106.5Mhz WYTE – Contemporary Country & Western – Established as WDLB-FM in 1965
- WGLX 103.3Mhz WGLX-FM – Classic Rock – Established as WFHR-FM in 1946, later WWRW.
- WSPT 97.9Mhz WSPT-FM – Greatest Hits – Established 1961.
- Wisconsin Public Radio 89.1 MHz WHAA – News, current affairs, and arts programming. Part of the Wisconsin Public Radio network, established locally 2007.

== Transportation ==
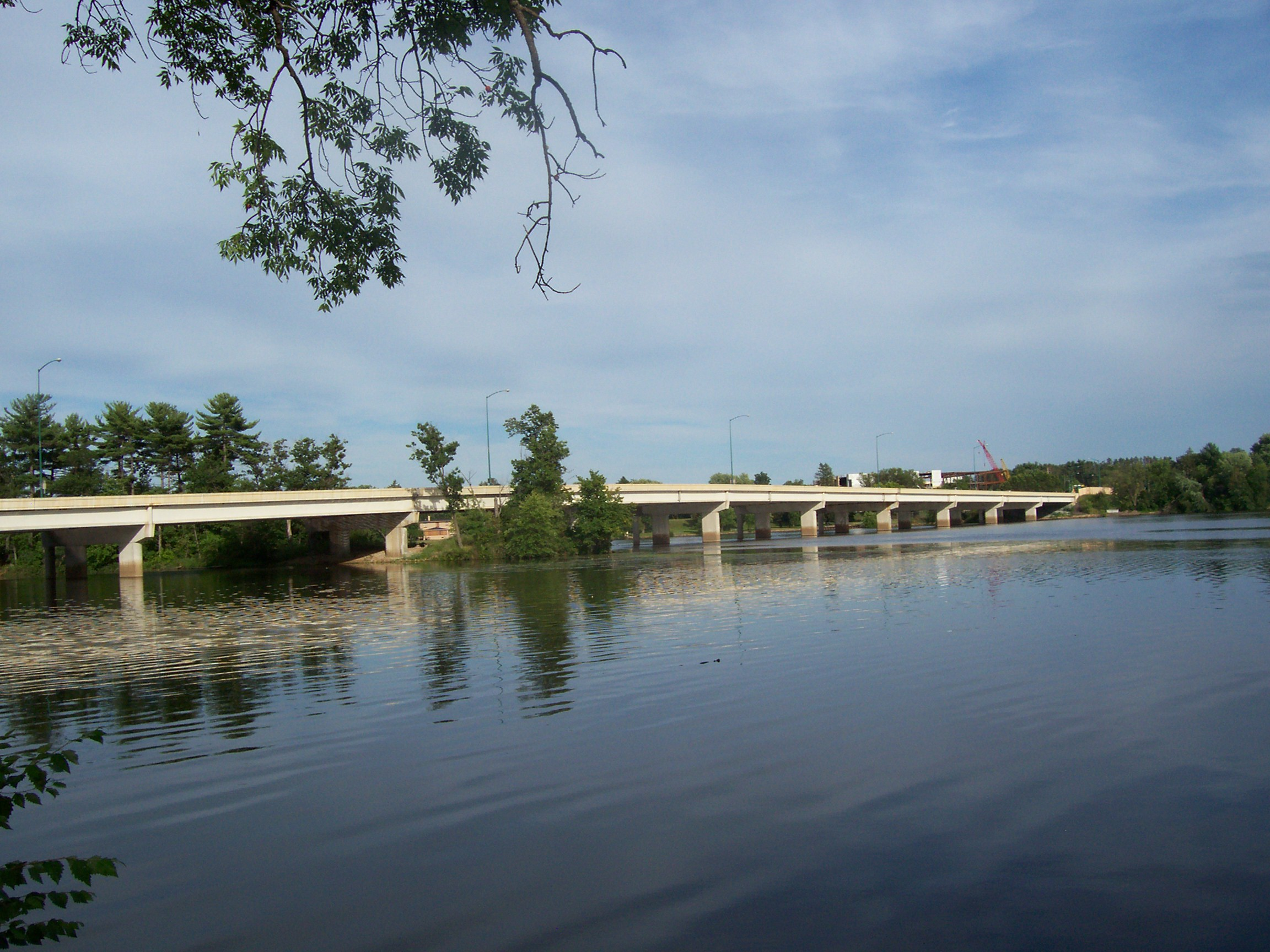
Wisconsin Highway 13 / 54 bridge over the Wisconsin River

The South Wood County Airport (IATA: ISW, ICAO: KISW, FAA LID: ISW), also known as Alexander Field, is a public use airport located one nautical mile (1.85 km) south of the central business district of Wisconsin Rapids. Dial-a-ride transit services are provided by River City Cab.

== Notable people ==
- Ken Anderson, professional wrestler
- Bonnie Bartlett, actress
- Vince Biegel, NFL linebacker for the Baltimore Ravens
- Bruno Block, MLB catcher
- Theodore W. Brazeau, Wisconsin legislator
- Arthur J. Crowns, Wisconsin legislator
- James Daly, actor
- Paul Dauenhauer, Engineer & inventor
- George R. Gardner, Wisconsin legislator
- Orestes Garrison, Wisconsin legislator
- John A. Gaynor, Wisconsin legislator
- Harvey F. Gee, Wisconsin legislator
- Bill Granger, journalist and novelist
- George Hambrecht, Wisconsin legislator
- Jidenna, hip-hop musician
- Stephen E. Johnson, U.S. Navy admiral
- William Merriam, Wisconsin legislator
- Tom Metcalf, MLB pitcher
- Edith Nash, educator and poet
- Philleo Nash, professor and anthropologist
- Grim Natwick, animator and film director
- George Allen Neeves, Wisconsin legislator
- Casey Nelson, NHL player
- John Offerdahl, NFL player
- Peter Pernin, Catholic pastor and Peshtigo fire memoirist
- John M. Potter, Wisconsin legislator
- Bryan Reffner, NASCAR driver
- Don Rehfeldt, All-American college and NBA basketball player
- Donald E. Reiland, Wisconsin legislator
- Scott Scharff, NFL player
- Thomas B. Scott, Wisconsin legislator
- Arthur H. Treutel, Wisconsin legislator
- Dick Trickle, NASCAR driver
- Robert Uehling, Wisconsin legislator
- Byrde M. Vaughan, Wisconsin legislator
- Charles M. Webb, Wisconsin legislator
- William E. Wheelan, Wisconsin legislator
- Herman C. Wipperman, Wisconsin legislator
- Isaac P. Witter, Wisconsin legislator
- Joseph Wood, merchant, and Wisconsin legislator
- Steve Zouski, Boxer
