= Admiral Johnson =

Admiral Johnson may refer to:

- Alfred Wilkinson Johnson (1876–1963), U.S. Navy vice admiral
- Charles Johnson (Royal Navy officer) (1869–1930), British Royal Navy admiral
- Gregory G. Johnson (born 1946), U.S. Navy admiral
- Harvey E. Johnson Jr. (fl. 1970s–2000s), U.S. Coast Guard vice admiral
- James Johnson (South African Navy officer) (1918–1990), South African Navy vice admiral
- Jay L. Johnson (born 1946), U.S. Navy admiral
- Jerome L. Johnson (born 1935), U.S. Navy admiral
- Roy L. Johnson (1906–1999), U.S. Navy admiral
- Stephen E. Johnson (born 1955), U.S. Navy rear admiral

== See also ==
- Folke Hauger Johannessen (1913–1997), Royal Norwegian Navy admiral
- Rolf Johannesson (1900–1989), German Bundesmarine Konteradmiral (rear admiral equivalent)
