= Gaynor Park =

Urban park in Wisconsin Rapids

Coordinates: 44°23′37″N 89°49′15″W

Gaynor Park is an urban park located in and administered by the city of Wisconsin Rapids, Wisconsin.

The park has an area of 4.64 acres (1.88 ha). Gaynor Park was named after John A. Gaynor, a local judge.
