= Daniel Whitney =

Daniel Whitney may refer to:

- Daniel Lawrence Whitney, better known as Larry the Cable Guy
- Daniel D. Whitney, mayor of Brooklyn, 1886–1887
- Daniel Whitney (entrepreneur) (1795–1862), entrepreneur in territorial Wisconsin
