= Y108 =

Y108 may refer to:

- CJXY-FM, a Mainstream Rock radio station in Hamilton, Ontario, Canada
- WDSY-FM, a Mainstream Country radio station in Pittsburgh, Pennsylvania, U.S.
- WYCO, an adult contemporary radio station in Wausau, Wisconsin, U.S. during the 1980s and 1990s
- KRXY-FM, a CHR radio station in Denver, Colorado, U.S. during the 1980s and early 1990s
- Yttrium-108 (Y-108 or ^{108}Y), an isotope of yttrium
