= Y106.5 =

Y106.5 may refer to:

- 106.5 WFYY-FM, a Hot AC formatted radio station licensed to serve Bloomsburg, Pennsylvania
- 106.5 WYTE-FM, a Country formatted radio station licensed to serve Marshfield, Wisconsin
- 106.5 KRYL-FM, a Country formatted radio station licensed to serve Haiku, Hawaii
