= WXCO =

Radio station in Wausau, Wisconsin

- Wausau, Wisconsin; United States
- Broadcast area: Wausau–Stevens Point area
- Frequency: 1230 kHz
- Branding: Bull Falls Radio

Programming
- Format: Progressive talk
- Affiliations: 24/7 News; Marquette Golden Eagles

Ownership
- Owner: Civic Media; (Civic Media, Inc.)
- Sister stations: WFHR; WIRI

History
- First air date: 1953
- Former call signs: WHVF (1953–1966)

Technical information
- Licensing authority: FCC
- Facility ID: 59611
- Class: C
- Power: 1,000 watts
- Transmitter coordinates: 44°58′10″N 89°36′25″W
- Translator: 98.9 W255DN (Wausau)

Links
- Public license information: Public file; LMS
- Webcast: Listen live
- Website: wxco.fm

WXCO (1230 AM) is a radio station licensed to Wausau, Wisconsin, broadcasting a progressive talk radio format, with programming from the statewide Civic Media Network. The station is owned by Civic Media, and serves the Wausau-Stevens Point area.

== History ==
The station's original call letters were WHVF (for owner, Hilding V. Foreen), signing on in 1953 with 250 watts of power, featuring a variety format with local personalities Buck Leverton, Hoots Roberts, Piano Roll Harold (Harold Golding), and Howie Stieber. The call letters remained in place until September 1964, when the current WXCO call letters were put in place by new owners, The Post Corporation. In 1973, the Station was sold to Seehafer Broadcasting, and an FM sister station, WYCO, was added in early 1985, which was later sold to NRG Media in 2006. In 2008, WXCO was sold to Sunrise Broadcasting, headed by Steven Resnick.

WXCO was the Wausau area's first full-time country music station, known for many years as "The Home of The Country Gentlemen" using local personalities until early 1990, when they went to a satellite format from SMN (ABC Radio), continuing until September 1993, when they switched to a talk radio format, featuring Rush Limbaugh, Alan Colmes, Dr. Dean Edell, Gil Gross, Barry Farber, Michael Reagan, and ESPN Radio, Saturday & Sunday Evenings. WXCO adopted a sports-talk format in the early 2000s, featuring the expanded ESPN Radio line-up. In February 2010, Sunrise Broadcasting added an FM sister station, WDTX 100.5, simulcasting the ESPN format. In late March the ESPN format was carried exclusively on the FM, and WXCO then returned to a News-Talk format. In May 2013, the News-Talk format was replaced by an in-house Adult Standards format, In late December 2015, a traditional Oldies format known as "Cool Oldies 1230" replaced the "Sunny 1230" format.

On November 25, 2019, WXCO changed their format from oldies to sports, branded as "Sports Fan 1230", assuming the format and branding from sister station WDTX (which began stunting towards a new format under new callsign WAVL that same day).

On August 1, 2022, WXCO changed formats following a sale by Sunrise to Madison based Civic Media, Inc. returning a News/Talk format to the station featuring local and statewide programming from the Civic Media Network. This ownership and format change also creates a new sister station relationship with Wisconsin Rapids based WFHR which shares Central Wisconsin specific news and programming with WXCO. The sale, at a price of $400,000, was consummated on October 20, 2022.
