= WFHR =

Radio station in Wisconsin Rapids, Wisconsin

- Wisconsin Rapids, Wisconsin; United States
- Broadcast area: Wood County, Wisconsin
- Frequency: 1320 kHz
- Branding: Local News and Timeless Hits

Programming
- Format: Oldies
- Affiliations: NBC News Radio; Wisconsin Badgers; Wisconsin Rapids Rafters

Ownership
- Owner: Civic Media; (Civic Media, Inc.)
- Sister stations: WIRI, WXCO

History
- First air date: November 1, 1940
- Call sign meaning: "William F Huffman Radio"

Technical information
- Licensing authority: FCC
- Facility ID: 73053
- Class: B
- Power: 5,000 watts (day); 90 watts (night)
- Transmitter coordinates: 44°24′56″N 89°50′6″W
- Translator: 97.5 W248DE (Wisconsin Rapids)

Links
- Public license information: Public file; LMS
- Website: wfhr.com

WFHR (1320 AM) is a radio station broadcasting hits from the 1960s and 1970s. Licensed to Wisconsin Rapids, Wisconsin, the station serves the Greater Wisconsin Rapids area and is part of the Wausau-Stevens Point Metro. WFHR features oldies music programming.

== History ==
The call letters were derived from William F Huffman Sr, owner of The Wisconsin Rapids Daily Tribune, which began broadcasting November 1, 1940. with a daytime and nighttime power of 250 watts, initially on 1310 kHz, moving to 1340 kHz in March 1941, remaining at that position until late 1959, when the move to the current frequency took place, increasing daytime power to 5,000 watts.

Over the years, WFHR's programming emphasis has been on Local News, Sports & Information, including the long-running "Kaffee Klatsch" morning call-in program, hosted by Arnie Strope and the Michaels and Morgan Show hosted by JD Michaels and Gary Morgan. Up until the mid 90s, WFHR's programming also included various music formats; from block programming in the '60s (mostly standards during the day, pop at night), to MOR/Adult Contemporary in the 1970s and early 1980s, along with several variations of Nostalgia and Oldies in the 1980s and early 1990s, using the programming services of Drake-Chenault and later TM Century. In 1980, WFHR began adding syndicated Talk programming to its roster with Larry King's late night Talk Show from Mutual Radio, switching to TalkNet From NBC in early 1984, then adding The Doctor Laura Schlessinger program to its afternoon line-up in the mid-1990s. A CBS Radio affiliate since the fall of 1972, the station initially carried Mutual News & Programming through the mid-1960s, and then, became an affiliate of the ABC Entertainment Network for a few years in the late 1960s and early 1970s. Some Mutual programming was carried in the early 1980s due to an agreement to broadcast The Larry King Show.

Effective April 16, 2021, WFHR and sister station WLJY were sold by Seehafer Broadcasting to Heart of Wisconsin Media, headed by Marcus C. Jaeger. By late November of that year, FM translator W248DE/97.5 signed on, simulcasting programming on 1320 kHz. On January 4, 2022, after moving to new studios, a format change to a 1960s-1970s oldies format was made, replacing all of the syndicated talk and sports programming. On August 1, 2022, WFHR changed hands, coming under the ownership of Madison based Civic Media. The format was returned to News/Talk continuing to offer much of the local programing that was offered under the previous ownership as well as retaining the WFHR staff. Most of the music programing was replaced with statewide programing from the Civic Media Network. This ownership and format change also pair WFHR with Wausau based WXCO allowing the stations to share programing specific to Central Wisconsin.

== Previous logos ==
WFHR's logo under former news/talk format

WFHR's logo with the previous design
