= Arthur H. Treutel =

American politician (1897–1966)

Arthur H. Treutel (May 21, 1897 – October 10, 1966) was an American politician who served as a member of the Wisconsin State Assembly.

== Biography ==
Treutel was born on May 21, 1897, in Wausau, Wisconsin. He later resided in Wisconsin Rapids, Wisconsin.

Treutel was elected to the Assembly in 1958. Additionally, he was Chairman of the Wood County, Wisconsin Democratic Party from 1954 to 1956 and a delegate to the Democratic National Convention in 1952 and 1956. He died on October 10, 1966, aged 69.
