= Donald E. Reiland =

American lawyer and politician

Donald E. Reiland (January 5, 1917 – February 23, 1957) was an American lawyer and politician.

Born in Wisconsin Rapids, Wisconsin, Reiland served in the United States Navy during World War. He then received his bachelor's degree from St. Mary's Seminary and University in Baltimore, Maryland and his law degree from University of Wisconsin Law School. Reiland practiced law in Wisconsin Rapids, Wisconsin and was acting District Attorney of Wood County, Wisconsin in 1951 and 1952. Reiland served in the Wisconsin State Assembly as a Republican. Reiland died in a hospital in Madison, Wisconsin.
