= WGLX-FM =

Radio station in Wisconsin Rapids, Wisconsin

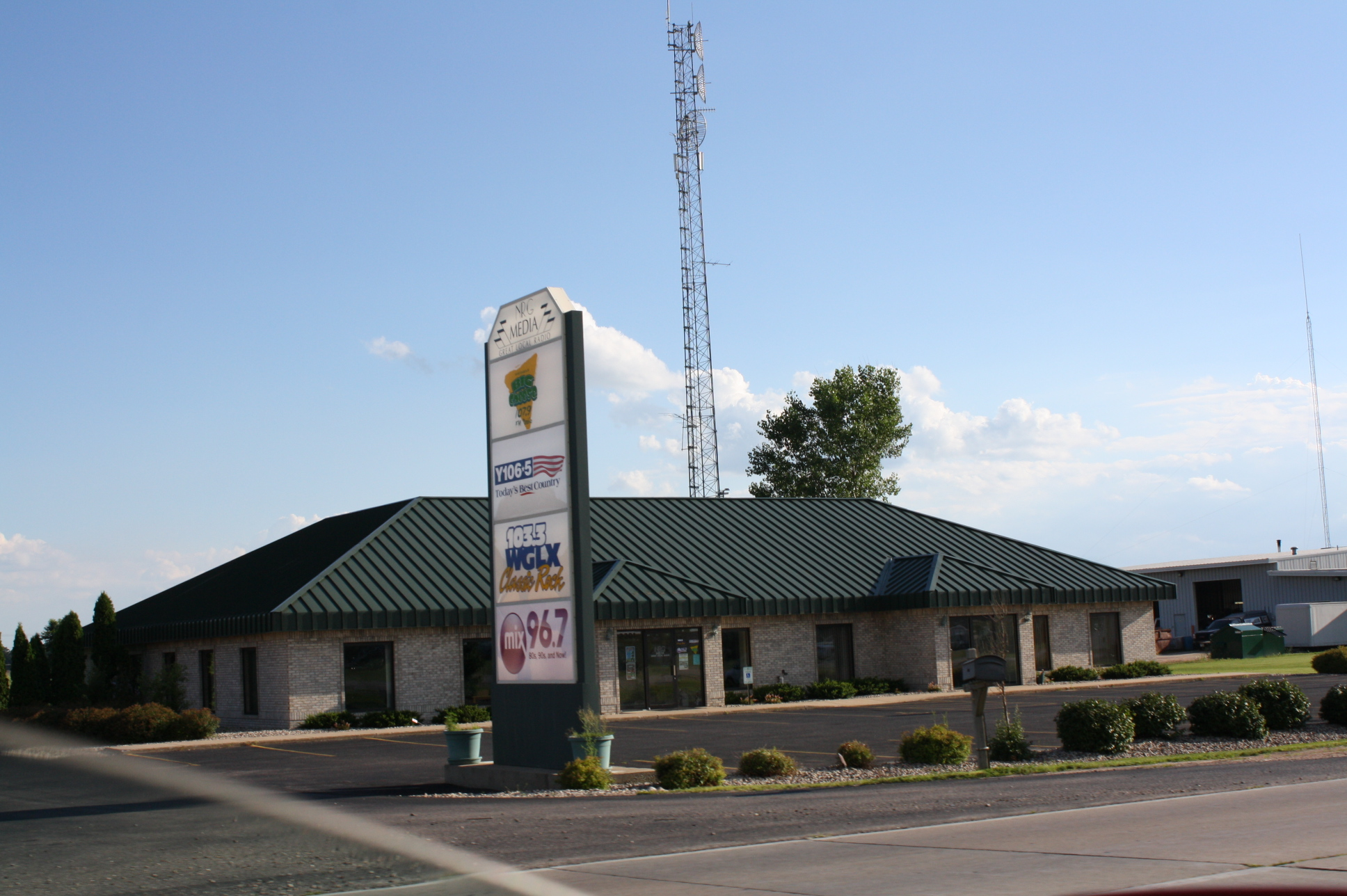
- Studios
- Wisconsin Rapids, Wisconsin; United States
- Broadcast area: Wausau–Stevens Point
- Frequency: 103.3 MHz
- Branding: Classic Rock 103.3

Programming
- Format: Classic rock
- Affiliations: Westwood One

Ownership
- Owner: NRG Media (sale to Midwest Communications pending); (NRG License Sub, LLC)
- Sister stations: WHTQ; WYTE; WBCV

History
- First air date: August 1946
- Former call signs: WFHR-FM (1946–1968); WWRW (1968–1994)
- Former frequencies: 104.7 MHz (1946–1948)

Technical information
- Licensing authority: FCC
- Facility ID: 73054
- Class: C1
- ERP: 100,000 watts
- HAAT: 244 meters
- Transmitter coordinates: 44°38′39.00″N 89°51′12.00″W

Links
- Public license information: Public file; LMS
- Webcast: Listen live
- Website: www.wglx.com

WGLX-FM (103.3 MHz) is a commercial radio station broadcasting a Classic rock format. Licensed to Wisconsin Rapids, Wisconsin, United States, the station serves the Wausau–Stevens Point area. The station is currently owned by NRG Media. Former call letters are WWRW (1968–1994) & WFHR-FM (1946–1968).

== History ==
Original station call letters were WFHR-FM, which signed on August 1, 1946, at 104.7 MHz, moving to the present position of 103.3 MHz, October 1948, simulcasting its AM sister station.

In early January 1968, the call letters WWRW were assigned, with a Beautiful/Easy Listening music format in place within a few weeks. WWRW still simulcasted some programming, including major news blocks with WFHR-AM through the early 1970s.

In early August 1975, the elevator music format was abandoned for Drake-Chenault's "Hit Parade", later "Contempo 300", an Adult Contemporary format. The station was then known as "W103" also "W103 in Stereo". WWRW was an affiliate of Dan Ingram's Top 40 Satellite Survey in the mid 80's.

In August 1989, a classic rock format from Broadcast Programming was put into place, dubbed "The Classic Touch" with a cut of smooth jazz once an hour...the results were dismal, even after tweaking the format several times. A return to adult contemporary music from the same syndicator then came in January 1991.

In the early part of 1994, a change to the present WGLX-FM call letters took place, with a classic rock format that proved much more successful, and live local personalities.

== Past and present owners ==
Original owners were William F.Huffman/Advance Broadcasting, Inc, who sold the AM/FM Combo to Gazette Printing Group, AKA Bliss Communications, in 1982.

The present owners, NRG Media, bought WGLX and WFHR in 2004, and eventually moved 103.3 to the current Plover studios, and later sold WFHR-AM to Seehafer Broadcasting, which also bought WDLB-AM and WOSQ-FM, Marshfield in 2006, from NRG, in exchange for 107.9 WLRK, now WBCV, Wausau.

In March 2026, it was announced that NRG would sell its Wausau and Rhinelander station clusters to Midwest Communications.
