= William E. Wheelan =

American politician

William E. Wheelan (December 30, 1872 – January 17, 1921) was an American lawyer and politician.

Born in Wisconsin Rapids, Wisconsin, Wheelan went to University of Wisconsin in 1890-1891 and then to University of Wisconsin Law School in 1896–1897. He was then admitted to the Wisconsin Bar in 1897 and practiced law in Wisconsin Rapids. Wheelan served as mayor of Wisconsin Rapids and was also the Wisconsin Rapids city attorney. Wheelan also served on the Wood County, Wisconsin Board of Supervisors. In 1911, Wheelan served in the Wisconsin State Assembly and was a Democrat. Wheelan died in the C&NM train station in West Bend, Wisconsin from a heart attack. Wheelan was returning to Wisconsin Rapids from Milwaukee, Wisconsin where he had business to take care of.
