= George R. Gardner =

American politician and lawyer

George Ransom Gardner (January 19, 1837 – December 20, 1897) was an American politician and lawyer.

Born in Horseheads, New York, the son of George Ellison and Mary Ann (Monroe) Gardner, George moved to Wisconsin in 1856, taught school, and worked on a farm. In 1856, Gardner returned to New York and worked on his family farm. During the American Civil War, Gardner served in the 48th New York Volunteer Infantry. He lost his right arm during the battle at Fort Wagner in South Carolina. Gardner then studied law in Watkins Glen, New York and was admitted to the New York bar in 1867. He practiced law in Watkins Glen, New York until 1870 and then moved to Breckenridge, Missouri where he continued to practice law. In 1873, Gardner moved to Grand Rapids, Wisconsin (now Wisconsin Rapids, Wisconsin), where he continued to practice law. Gardner served as district attorney and county judge of Wood County, Wisconsin. In 1878, Gardner also served as mayor of Grand Rapids, Wisconsin. In 1883, Gardner served in the Wisconsin State Assembly and was a Republican. He also served on the board of education. Gardner died at his home in Grand Rapids, Wisconsin.
