= John A. Gaynor =

American politician

John A. Gaynor (October 1, 1846 – May 12, 1915) was an American businessman, jurist, and politician.

Born in County Longford, Ireland, Gaynor emigrated with his parents to the United States in 1851 and settled in the town of Lisbon, Waukesha County, Wisconsin. Gaynor graduated from University of Wisconsin and then taught school. He then went to University of Wisconsin Law School and was admitted to the Wisconsin bar. Gaynor practiced law in Wisconsin Rapids, Wisconsin. Gaynor served in the Wisconsin State Assembly in 1893 and was a Democrat. He served on the Wood County, Wisconsin Board of Supervisors, served as district attorney of Wood County and was county judge from 1898 to 1902. Gaynor also served on the Wisconsin Common Council and the school board. Gaynor died in Wisconsin Rapids, Wisconsin after being ill for a few months.
