= WHTQ =

Radio station in Whiting, Wisconsin

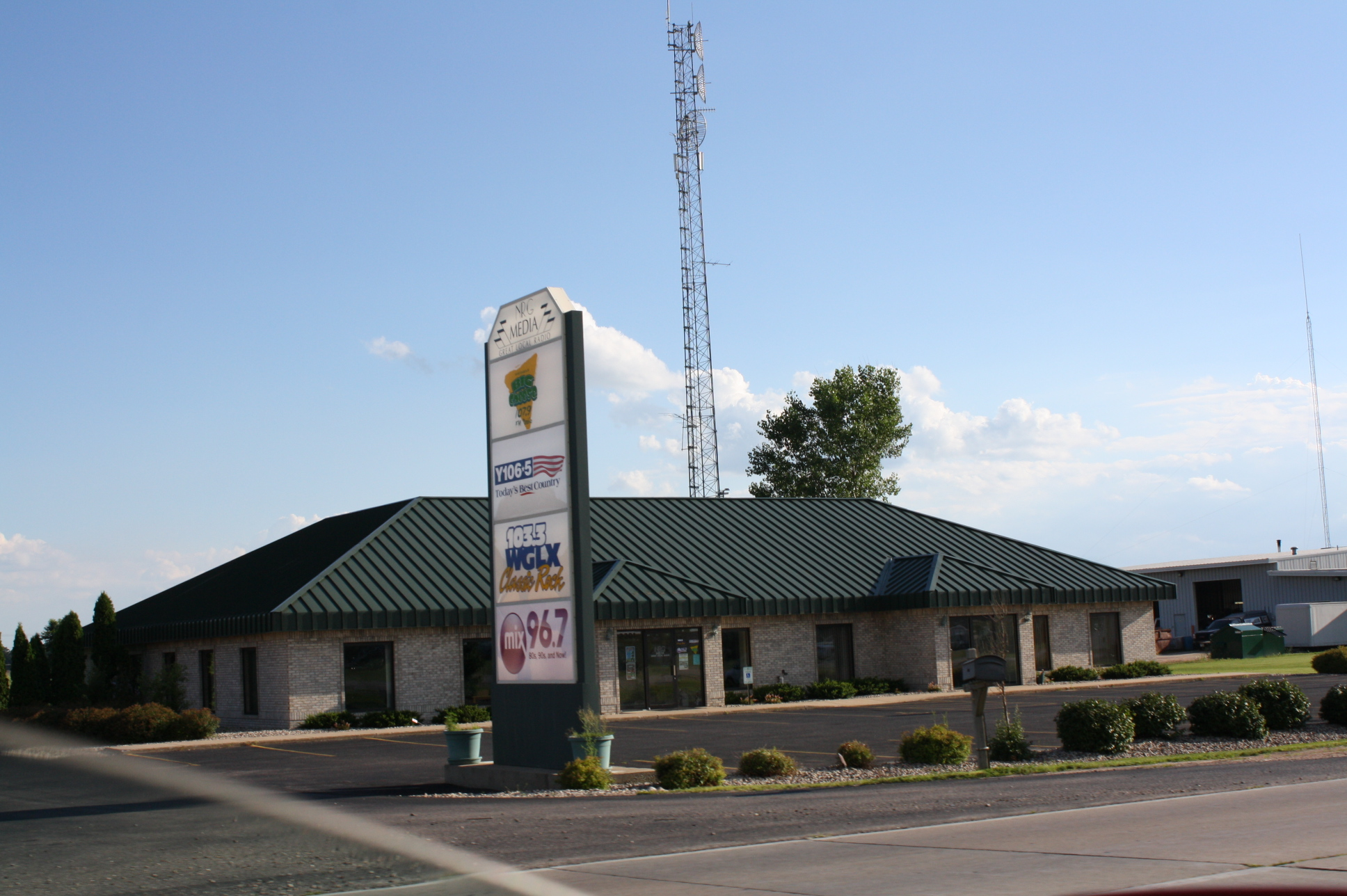
- Studios
- Whiting, Wisconsin; United States
- Broadcast area: Wausau metropolitan area
- Frequency: 96.7 MHz
- Branding: Hot 96-7

Programming
- Language: English
- Format: Contemporary hit radio
- Affiliations: Compass Media Networks; Premiere Networks; Westwood One

Ownership
- Owner: NRG Media (sale to Midwest Communications pending); (NRG License Sub, LLC)
- Sister stations: WYTE; WBCV; WGLX-FM

History
- First air date: October 21, 1985
- Former call signs: WYTE (1985–2006); WLJY (2006–2012)
- Call sign meaning: Hot

Technical information
- Licensing authority: FCC
- Facility ID: 60004
- Class: C2
- ERP: 26,500 watts
- HAAT: 207 meters (679 ft)
- Transmitter coordinates: 44°38′33.00″N 89°51′24.00″W

Links
- Public license information: Public file; LMS
- Webcast: Listen live
- Website: www.hot967fm.com

WHTQ (96.7 FM) is a commercial radio station broadcasting a contemporary hit radio format. Licensed to Whiting, Wisconsin, United States, the station serves the Wausau–Stevens Point area. The station is currently owned by NRG Media through licensee NRG License Sub, LLC.

== History ==
The station first went on the air on October 21, 1979 as WYTE.

On August 1, 2006, WYTE swapped call signs with WLJY (on 106.5).

On December 27, 2011, WLJY changed their format to contemporary hits branded as "HOT 96-7". The first song on "Hot" was "Stereo Hearts" by Gym Class Heroes. As part of its launch to the new CHR format, the station announced through a series of short on-air sweepers that, "HOT 96-7 is commercial free through the New Year" and proceeded to play non-stop, commercial free Top 40 music for over 10 consecutive days, first airing commercials on the evening of January 6. WHTQ's main rivalry is with Wausau's, 95.5 WIFC. Also broadcasting in a Top 40/CHR format, in January 2015, former WIFC Brand Manager & Middays Tony Waitekus, was made Hot 96.7's new Program Director.

In January 2012, the station call letters were changed from WLJY to WHTQ as reflected in its on-air legal ID and Facebook contact information.

== Personalities and programs ==
As a result of the station's December 2011 format change to CHR, the previously heard local and national personalities are no longer there. When branded and formatted as "Mix 96-7", programming included on air personalities Eric Westphal from 6am-10am, Jen O'Dell from 10am-3pm, Ryan Seacrest from 3pm-7pm and John Tesh from 7pm-Midnight and Dave Farmbrough and Woody weekends. The station also featured a Saturday "'80s Rewind" feature program which contained all 1980s music from 10am-10pm every Saturday, a program feature that has been dropped in keeping with the all-hit ("HOT 96-7") format. In September 2012 Kim Carr was hired for weekday nights 7pm-midnight. She also took over as Promotions Director in September 2014. In June 2013, WHTQ hired DJ London to host their weekday drive time spot from 2pm-7pm. London was moved to Mornings in February 2015.

Other programs previously heard on the "Mix" 96-7 format included "American Top 40 Countdown w/ Ryan Seacrest", Backtraxx USA with Kidd Kelly and "Intelligence For Your Life" with John Tesh. The American Top 40 w/ Ryan Seacrest program continues to run on the HOT format on Saturday mornings. The station's website, www.hot967fm.com, exists as a static page currently with links to the station's Facebook and listener information data form to collect text messaging information likely for future promotion(s).
