= WIRI (FM) =

Radio station in Nekoosa, Wisconsin

- Nekoosa, Wisconsin; United States
- Broadcast area: Wausau-Stevens Point area
- Frequency: 105.5 MHz
- Branding: Wiscountry

Programming
- Format: Classic country
- Affiliations: Marquette Golden Eagles

Ownership
- Owner: Civic Media, Inc.
- Sister stations: WFHR, WXCO

History
- First air date: 2003 (as KZZA)
- Former call signs: KZZA (2003); WUSP (2003–2008); WRCW (2008–2013); WLJY (2013–2021)
- Call sign meaning: "Wisconsin Rapids"

Technical information
- Licensing authority: FCC
- Facility ID: 85832
- Class: A
- ERP: 6,000 watts
- HAAT: 85 meters (279 ft)
- Transmitter coordinates: 44°21′45.00″N 90°3′58.00″W

Links
- Public license information: Public file; LMS

WIRI (105.5 MHz) is an FM radio station broadcasting a classic country music format. Licensed to Nekoosa, Wisconsin, United States, the station serves the Central Wisconsin area. The station is currently owned by Civic Media.

== History ==
The station went on the air as KZZA on July 22, 2003. Three days later, the station changed its call sign to WUSP, and on March 5, 2008, to WRCW. The call sign became WLJY on September 16, 2013. with the format change from oldies as "Kool Gold 105.5" to an adult contemporary format as "Y105.5". WLJY became WIRI on May 1, 2021.

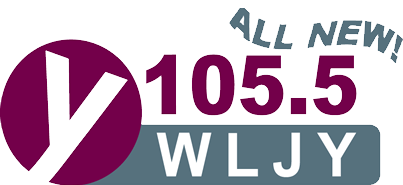
Former logo as Y105.5 WLJY

On June 23, 2021, WIRI flipped to classic country as "Country Legends 24/7".

On August 3, 2022, it was announced that Civic Media would acquire WIRI, along with sister station WFHR and its translator, W248DE. The purchase, at a price of $886,000, was consummated on October 3, 2022.
