= WBCV =

Radio station in Wausau, Wisconsin

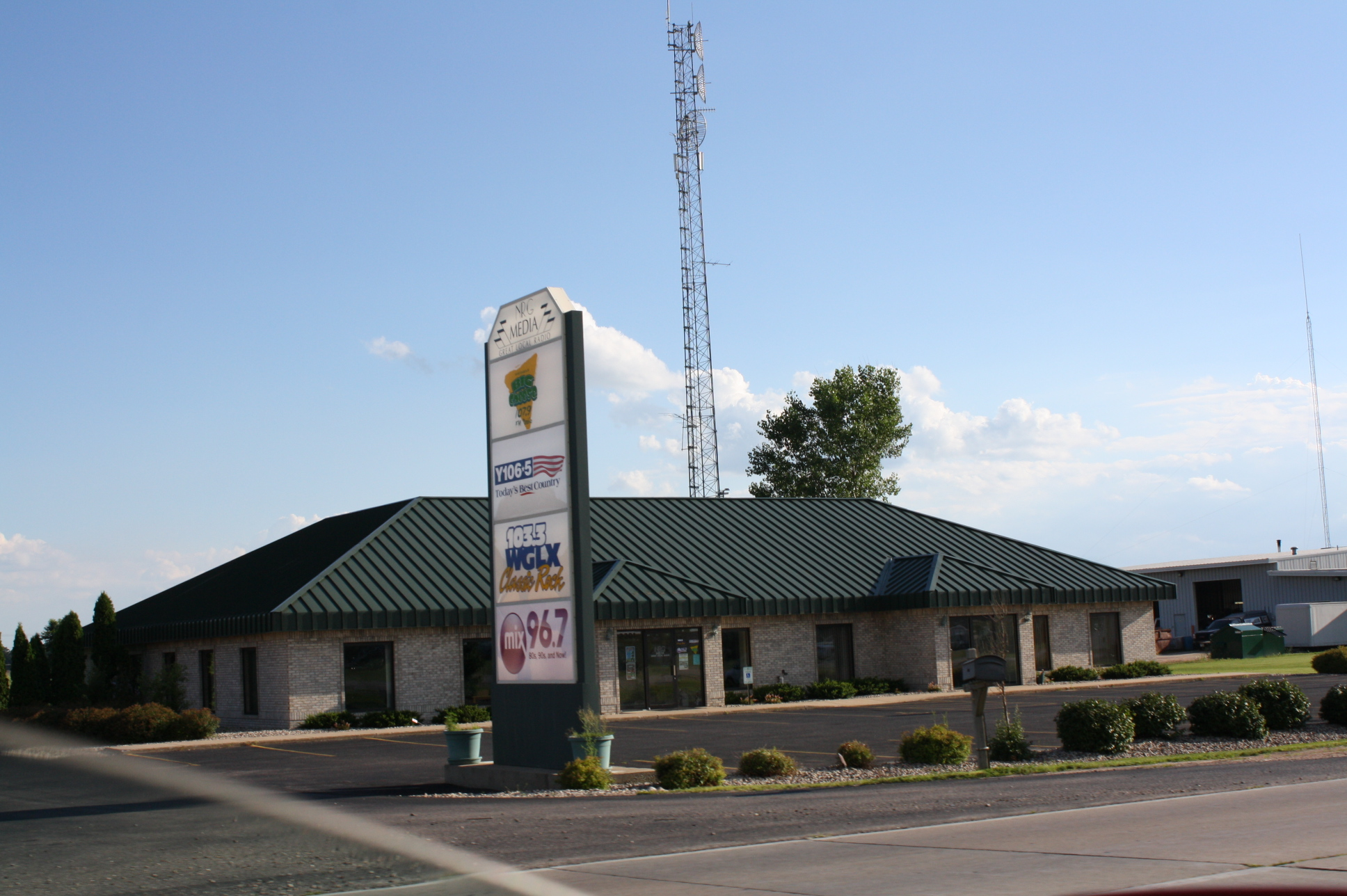
- Wausau, Wisconsin; United States
- Broadcast area: Wausau–Stevens Point, Wisconsin
- Frequency: 107.9 MHz
- Branding: Big Cheese 107.9

Programming
- Format: Adult hits–classic hits–classic rock
- Affiliations: Premiere Networks; United Stations Radio Networks; Westwood One

Ownership
- Owner: NRG Media (sale to Midwest Communications pending); (NRG License Sub, LLC)
- Sister stations: WGLX-FM; WHTQ; WYTE

History
- First air date: October 1984
- Former call signs: WXCO-FM (1983–1984, CP); WYCO-FM (1984–2004); WLRK (2004–2006)
- Call sign meaning: "Wisconsin's Big Cheese Victory"

Technical information
- Licensing authority: FCC
- Facility ID: 59608
- Class: C
- ERP: 100,000 watts
- HAAT: 314 meters (1,030 ft)
- Transmitter coordinates: 45°3′33.00″N 89°26′10.00″W

Links
- Public license information: Public file; LMS
- Webcast: Listen live
- Website: bigcheese1079.com

WBCV (107.9 FM, "The Big Cheese") is a radio station broadcasting an adult hits–classic hits–classic rock format, licensed to Wausau, Wisconsin. The station serves the Wausau–Stevens Point area, and is owned by NRG Media, LLC.
