= Daniel Whitney (entrepreneur) =

American entrepreneur

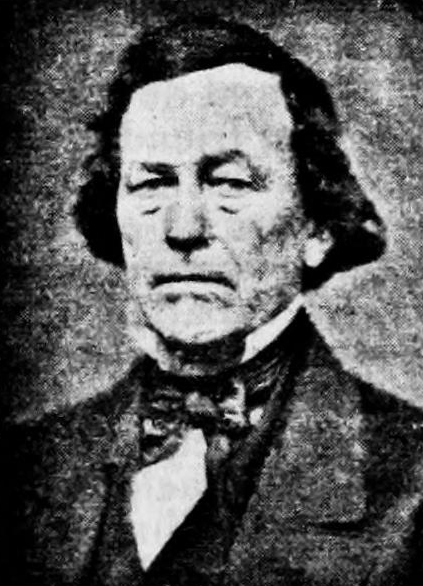
- Born: September 3, 1795; Gilsum, New Hampshire
- Died: November 4, 1862 (aged 67); Green Bay, Wisconsin
- Occupation: Pioneering Wisconsin entrepreneur
- Spouse: Emeline S. Henshaw (1803-1890) (m. 1826–1862)
- Children: Daniel, Harriett, Joshua, William, Charles, John, Henry
- Parent(s): Samuel Whitney and Mary Whitney

Daniel Whitney (September 3, 1795 – November 4, 1862) was an early entrepreneur in territorial Wisconsin, whose businesses were responsible for much of the early development of that state in the period between the War of 1812 and statehood. He was the first "Yankee" to settle in Green Bay. He was the first to start many of the type of business ventures that the state became known for, such as the first lead shot tower and the first saw mill on the Wisconsin River. He was the private founder of the town of Navarino, a direct forerunner to the municipality of Green Bay. He died in 1862 in the home he lived in for over 30 years in Green Bay.

== Childhood in New Hampshire ==
Whitney was born 3 September 1795 in Gilsum, New Hampshire, the son of Samuel and Mary Whitney. Samuel was a Revolutionary War veteran who served in the unit of his father-in-law, Captain Joshua Whitney. (Samuel and Mary Whitney were distant cousins, having a common great-great-grandfather.) After the war he settled in the then frontier town of Gilsum, where he farmed and was involved in community service and government. Daniel was the seventh of nine children of Samuel and Mary.

== Pioneer Wisconsin merchant ==
Prior to the War of 1812, the United States nominally owned the far reaches of the Northwest Territory — Michigan, Wisconsin and northern Illinois — but was too weak to effectively assert sovereignty in the region. After that war, federal authorities began a systemic program of exploration, fort building, arrangements of treaties between tribes, purchasing of land from tribes, surveying, and licensing of merchants (primarily fur traders). In this atmosphere, young merchants from throughout New York and New England departed from western New York and travelled up the Great Lakes to various towns and outposts to engage in trade. Whitney was one such merchant, settling in Green Bay in 1819.

Whitney engaged in a series of trade expeditions, sometimes by himself but usually while employing hired hands as voyageurs, freight haulers and clerks. In these expeditions, Whitney explored the Fox to its source, and the Wisconsin from Point Basse to Prairie du Chien. He established trading posts on the upper Mississippi to the west and Sault Ste. Marie to the north beyond Mackinac. In 1821-22 he was the sutler at Fort Snelling (modern day Minneapolis). In one trading trip, he travelled from Fort Snelling to Detroit by foot with one assistant to help haul the goods and supplies on a toboggan. Through these early trips, Whitney gained first-hand knowledge of the conditions under which his future enterprises would be founded.

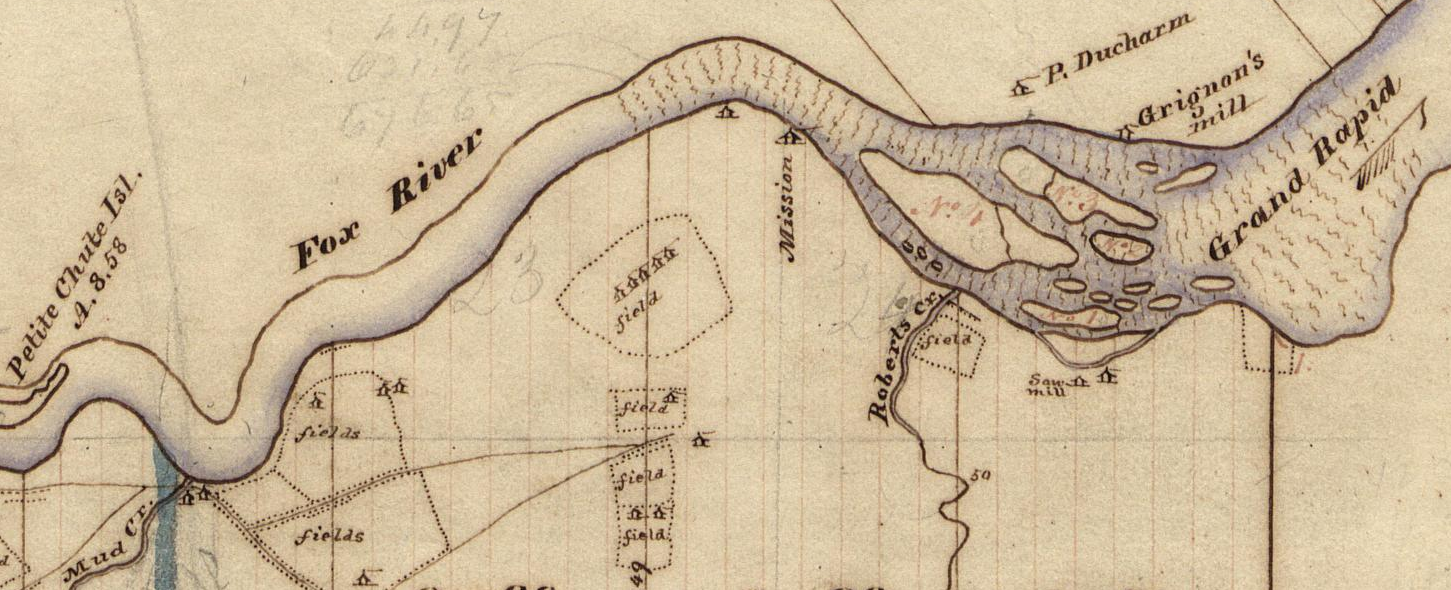
1825 plat map of Stockbridge settlement at Grand Kaukauna. Whitney's store was on the far west side at the mouth of Mud Creek.

In the lower Fox Valley, Whitney had several establishments developed, including a large frame building store in the vicinity of Fort Howard. This store supplied the needs of settlers, traders, farmers and the growing government administrative staff of officials who were responsible for the region, then part of Michigan Territory. About 20 miles upstream at Grand Kaukauna (Note: In Whitney's day, spellings varied widely. Grand Kakalin was probably the most common spelling at that time.) he maintained a store on the south shore of the Fox (which runs east and west at that point), which served the needs of the Stockbridge Indians who had a settlement there. The store was often managed by an associate, such as his nephew David Whitney. The Stockbridge eventually sold and abandoned that site, but in the course of their stay Whitney developed more general business relationships with them, often employing Stockbridge in his other businesses around the state.

During this same period Whitney was engaged as a contract supplier to the federal facilities at Fort Crawford, Fort Howard and Fort Winnebago.

== Lumbering interests ==
In 1827, Whitney hired 22 Stockbridge Indians with his nephew as superintendent to cut shingles near Point Basse. At the time, it was Indian territory with rights claimed by Ho-Chunk and Menominee. Whitney made a private deal with the Ho-Chunk for permission, which was illegal. The commander at Fort Winnebago confronted Whitney and eventually burned or confiscated the shingles.

In 1831 Whitney, this time with permission of the War Department, developed the rapids at Point Basse to power a sawmill. His was the first commercial sawmill on the river, and the first on any tributary of the upper Mississippi. The lumber industry was destined to develop into a major industry in Wisconsin later in the century, giving impetus to much of the general development including settlement, agriculture, and railroad building. Whitney's facility was the first, and demonstrated and paved the way both in terms of techniques and in terms of location of markets downstream in Dubuque and Saint Louis, supplying the demands of western settlers in the middle prairie regions.

== Shot tower and Fox-Wisconsin Waterway ==
In 1831 Whitney formed a company along with investors from Detroit and Mineral Point to build a shot tower on the lower Wisconsin, just north of the prime lead mining region. Lead as shot compared to lead ingots carried more value per ton and therefore these investors saw a good opportunity. Whitney hired a small crew to go to his new saw mill at Pointe Basse and saw enough lumber for the tower and any other needed facilities. The shaft digging was delayed during the Blackhawk War, but shot was manufactured starting in 1830.

As the shot tower was beginning its operation, Whitney also built a store at Helena, which was to serve local workers but also other settlers in the area and travelers along the river. This store featured a full supply of the necessities for early settlers, including salt, stoves, ovens, meat, flour, pots, skillets, candles, guns, furniture, cows and calves, etc. The wholesale supply routes for these goods were up the river via St. Louis, down from Green Bay via Fort Winnebago, and overland from Blue Mounds on freight wagons.

== Fox River Valley transit development ==
In the 1830s and 1840s, Whitney tried to organize transit for lead shot from his tower at Helena via the Great Lakes to markets in New York. The transit system consisted of loading boats in Helena, towing them by steam to Portage, carrying them across the Portage via wagon, and floating them down the Fox River to steam boats in Green Bay. On the return trip, the empty boats (if they could not otherwise get return cargo) were towed up the Fox by a special purpose steam boat on Lake Winnebago and as far as Puckaway Lake. While the Durham boats were ideal for their task on the Fox River, the overall operation was too complex to compete with other means.

== Land owner, developer of Navarino ==
Whitney acquired title to land on the east side of the Fox River across from Fort Howard and in 1829 laid out the town of Navarino. Just to the south was the town of Astor, owned by John Jacob Astor's American Fur Company. Navarino and Astor were rival towns, but in 1838 they agreed to merge and form the borough of Green Bay.

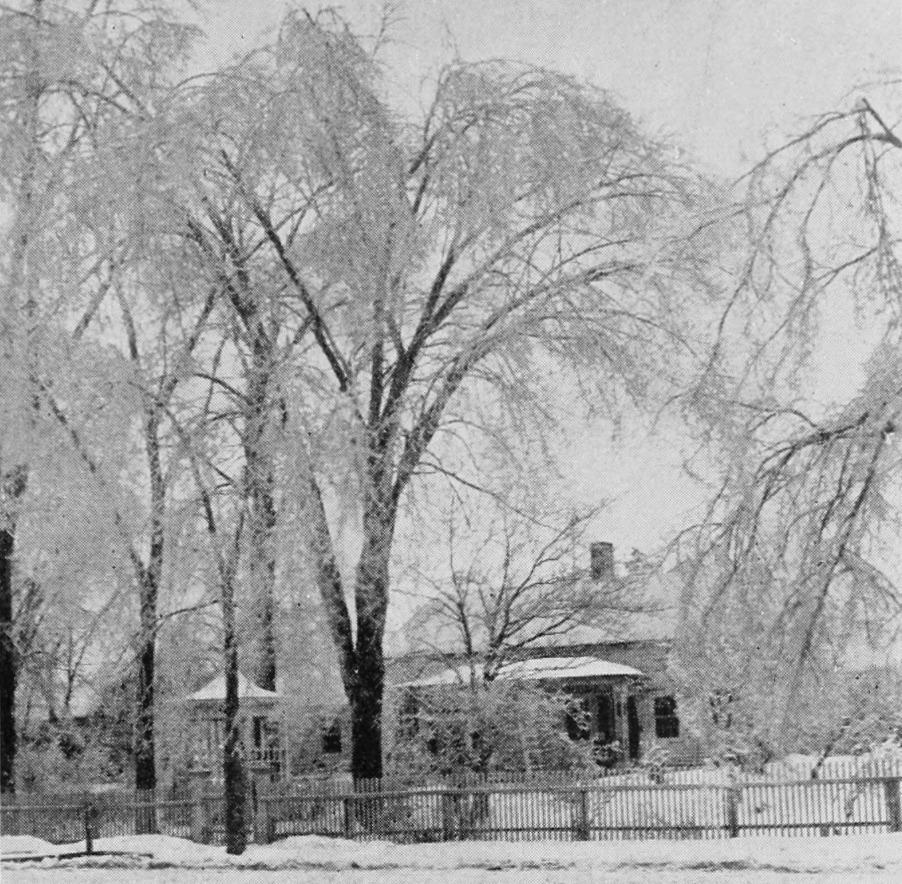
Daniel and Emeline Whitney house, originally built in Navarino, part of modern Green Bay. This photo was taken a few years after Emeline died in 1890.

== Family ==
Whitney made many extended business trips back to New England, and in 1826 he returned with his new wife, Emmeline Stillman Henshaw. They had seven children, 3 of whom died in childhood. Emmeline lived until 1890. George Whitney Calhoun, the co-founder of the Green Bay Packers, was the great grandson of Whitney.

== Notes ==
Attributions

- Childs, Ebenezer (1859). "Recollections of Wisconsin Since 1820". Wisconsin Historical Collections. IV. State Historical Society of Wisconsin: 153–195.
- Libby, Orin Grant (1895a). "Significance of the Lead and Shot Trade In Early Wisconsin History". Wisconsin Historical Collections. XIII. State Historical Society of Wisconsin: 307–309.
- Libby, Orin Grant (1895b). "Chronicle of the Helena Shot-tower". Wisconsin Historical Collections. XIII. State Historical Society of Wisconsin: 335–374.
- Mansfield, John Brandt, ed. (1899). Volume 1 of History of the Great Lakes. Chicago: J.H. Beers & Company.
- Martin, Deborah Beaumont; Beaumont, Sophie (1899). Old Green Bay. New York: Cheltenham Press.
- Pierce, Frederick Clifton (1895). The Descendants of John Whitney. Chicago: W. B. Conkey Co.
- Thwaites, Reuben Gold, ed. (1900). "Some Wisconsin Indian Conveyances, 1793-1836". Wisconsin Historical Collections. XV. State Historical Society of Wisconsin: 1–24.
