= Stephen E. Johnson =

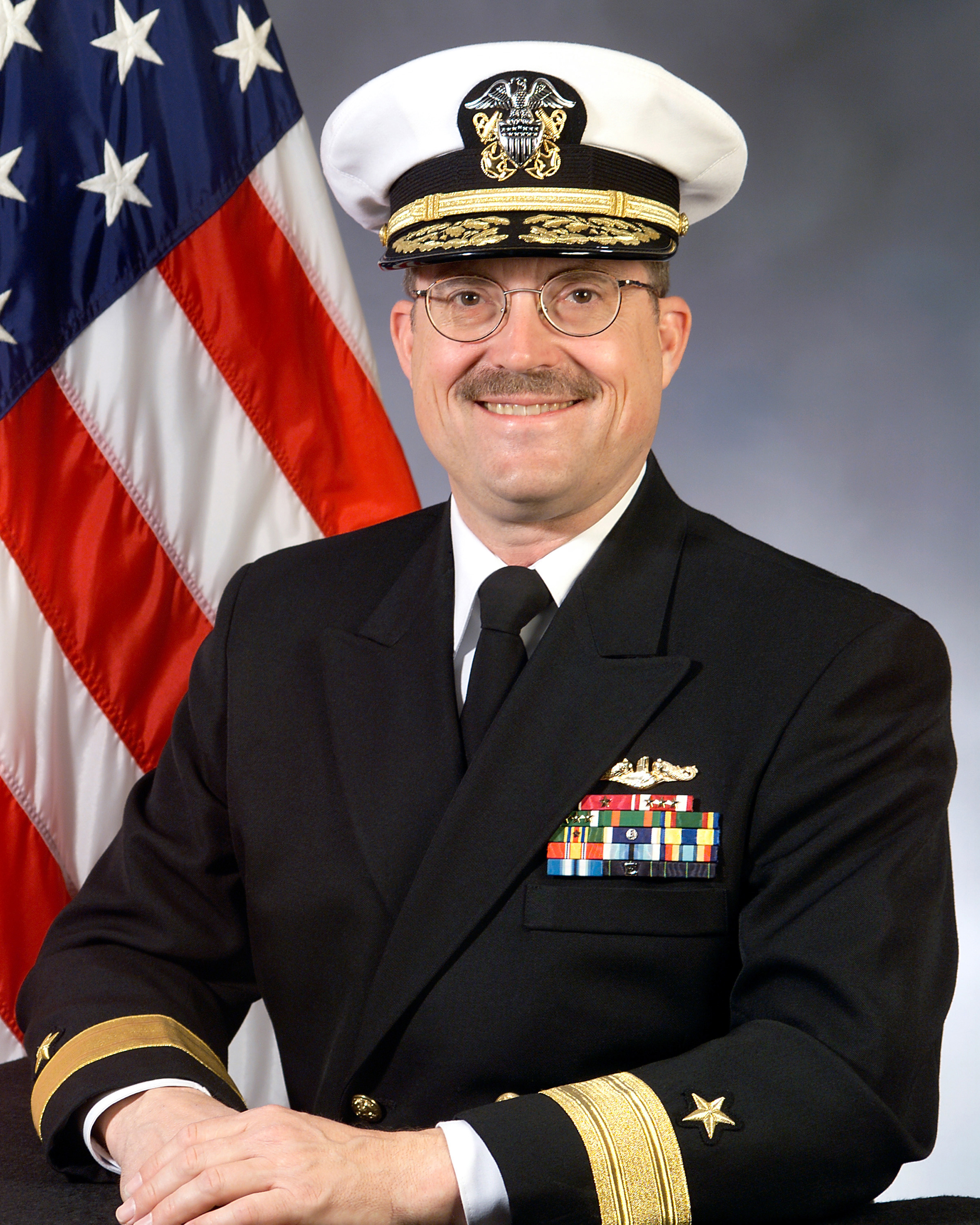
Rear Adm. Johnson in 2004

Stephen Elliot Johnson (born 1955) is a retired rear admiral in the United States Navy.

== Biography ==
A native of Wisconsin Rapids, Wisconsin, Johnson graduated from the University of Wisconsin-Madison in 1977 with degrees in accounting and information management.

== Career ==
Johnson served as commander of the submarine USS Chicago from 1992 to 1995. From 1998 to 2003, he served as program manager in the production of the Seawolf-class submarines. Later, he served as Director of Undersea Technology of the Naval Sea Systems Command and took command of the Naval Undersea Warfare Center. In 2006, he was named Director of Strategic Systems Programs.

Awards he has received include the Legion of Merit with award star, the Meritorious Service Medal with two award stars, and the Navy Commendation Medal with two awards stars.

Johnson retired from the Navy in 2015, and was immediately recruited by the Australian Defence Department as its general manager for submarines. He was promoted to the position of deputy secretary of defence within the Department of Defence in 2016, an unusual position for a non-Australian. He resigned from the position in 2019.
