= WYTE =

Radio station in Marshfield, Wisconsin

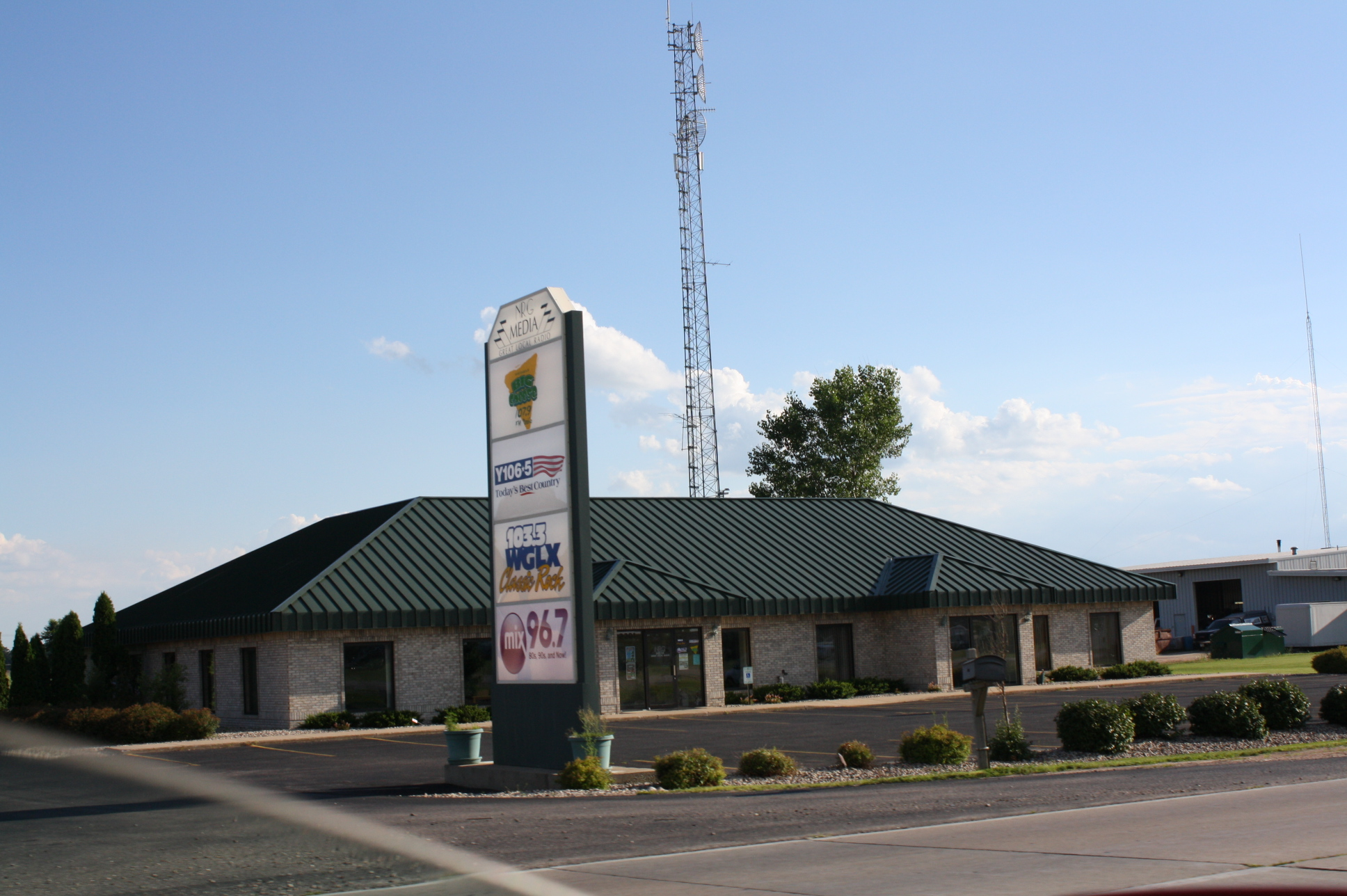
- Studios
- Marshfield, Wisconsin; United States
- Broadcast area: Wausau–Stevens Point
- Frequency: 106.5 MHz
- Branding: Y106.5

Programming
- Format: Country
- Affiliations: Westwood One

Ownership
- Owner: NRG Media (sale to Midwest Communications pending); (NRG License Sub, LLC)
- Sister stations: WHTQ; WBCV; WGLX-FM

History
- First air date: August 3, 1965
- Former call signs: WDLB-FM (1965–1979); WLJY (1979–2006)
- Call sign meaning: Derived from Whiting, the city of license for the station's former home at 96.7 FM

Technical information
- Licensing authority: FCC
- Facility ID: 24444
- Class: C1
- ERP: 100,000 watts
- HAAT: 244 meters (801 ft)
- Transmitter coordinates: 44°38′39.00″N 89°51′12.00″W

Links
- Public license information: Public file; LMS
- Webcast: [{{{url}}} Listen live]
- Website: www.y1065.com

WYTE (106.5 FM, Y106.5) is a commercial radio station broadcasting a country music format. Licensed to Marshfield, Wisconsin, United States, the station serves the Wausau–Stevens Point area. The station is currently owned by NRG Media, LLC.

== History ==
The station went on the air as WDLB-FM on August 3, 1965. On October 22, 1979, the station changed its call sign to WLJY; on August 1, 2006, it changed to the current WYTE.

On-air personalities currently hosting programs on Y106.5 include The Wake Up Call with Big Red & Dana, Joe Malone, Greg Lee and Kim Carr. Previous on-air personalities have included Eric Westphal, John Harry, Kimberlee Ann, Brad Austin, Ed Paulson, Ritch Cassidy, Kelli Martin, Mark Skibba, Ken Steckbauer, Lou Stewart, John Jost, and many others.

Night time programming is the nationally syndicated Nights with Elaina out of Nashville. Weekend programs include the “Saturday Morning Polka Party” hosted by Don Wayerski and Ben Jammin. The show airs Saturday mornings from 7 a.m. - to 10 a.m.; it features music, requests, dedications, and community news. The nationally syndicated B-Dub Radio airs on Saturday nights. Sunday mornings feature recently popular music on the American Country Countdown with Ryan Fox, while on Sunday nights Country Gold with Steve Harmon features popular country music from the 1980s to 2000s.

== 25th birthday ==
In November 2010, Y106.5 celebrated its 25th Birthday in Central Wisconsin. National recording artist Jerrod Niemann performed as part of the ceremonies which included the giving away of a 1985 Chevy pick-up truck to a lucky listener. WYTE first signed on as a country station in the fall of 1985 on the old 96.7 frequency. WLJY and WYTE flipped frequencies in August 2006 with WLJY then residing at 96.7. In late 2011, WLJY became WHTQ / "Hot 96-7".
