= Point Basse =

- Historic Village
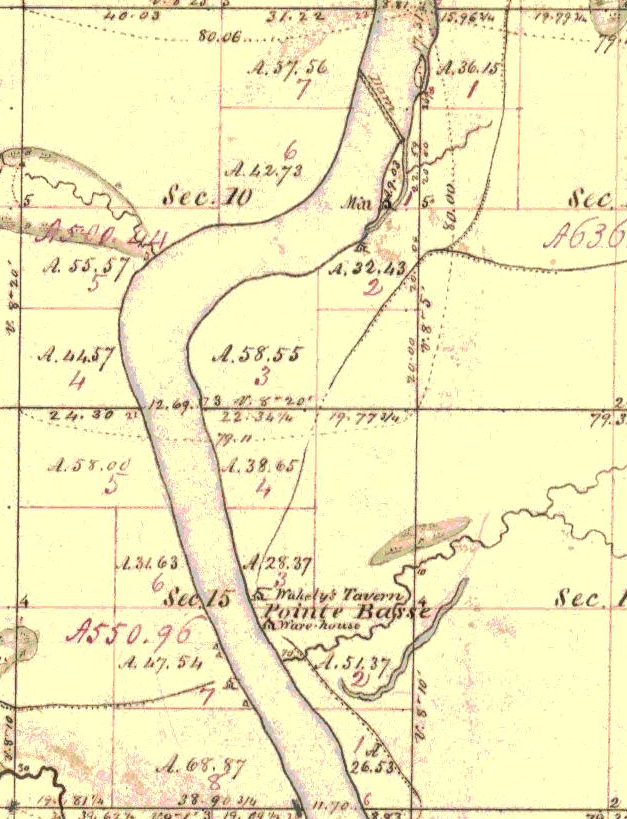
- Original land survey map (1851).

- Location within the state of Wisconsin
- Coordinates: 44°18′1″N 89°53′24″W

Point Basse refers to both a sharp bend in the Wisconsin River near present day Nekoosa, Wisconsin, as well as to a nearby historic village downstream from the point itself, the village no longer being in existence. Other historic spellings included Pointe Basse, Point Bas, and Point Boss. The Ojibwe name for the village on the west side of the river at the same location was Bangahjewung. There is no currently existing geographic feature which retains the name. It was the location of the first rapids for travelers heading up stream, and the first place where these rapids were exploited for mill power.

The village site was the location of a shallow river crossing that could be forded with a team of horses and a wagon at low water. In the winter, it was often safe to cross the ice. The crossing was near the end of modern day Wakely Road. Wakely was the name of a tavern owner at Point Basse in the 1830s and 1840s. The geographic "point" that gave the town the name is the sharp bend about two miles upstream from the crossing, or a mile upstream from the modern Highway 73 bridge.

The village became a crossroads of sorts, and for a brief span of years the primary terminus of the pineries road. In 1836 at the Cedar Point Treaty, the Menominee ceded to the US federal government a strip of land, three miles on each side of the river, beginning at Point Basse and extending to Big Bull Falls (modern Wausau, Wisconsin). Shortly after the cession was made, the mills on this strip of land grew to become the heart of the Wisconsin River lumber industry.

== Bibliography ==
- Ellis, A. G. "The 'Upper Wisconsin' Country". Wisconsin Historical Collections, Vol. III (1857). pp. 435–452.
- Durbin, Richard D. (1997). The Wisconsin River: An Odyssey Through Time and Space. Cross Plains, WI: Spring Freshet Press. ISBN 0-9658559-0-2.
