= Charles Brown =

Charles or Charlie Brown may refer to:

== People ==
=== Arts and entertainment ===
==== Music ====
- Charlie Brown (singer) (born 1986), British singer
- Charlie Brown (born 1970), American rapper and member of Leaders of the New School
- Charles Brown (musician) (1922–1999), American blues singer
- Charlie Brown Jr. (band), Brazilian rock band
  - Charlie Brown Jr. (demo tape), 1995

==== Other arts and entertainment ====
- Charlie Brown (DJ) (c. 1942 – 2022), American radio DJ
- Charles Brockden Brown (1771–1810), American novelist
- Charles D. Brown (1887–1948), American stage and film actor
- Charles Brown (actor) (1946–2004), American actor with Negro Ensemble Company

=== Military ===
- Charlie Brown (pilot) (1922–2008), American World War II pilot
  - Charlie Brown and Franz Stigler incident, 1943
- Charles Brown (Royal Navy officer) (c. 1678 – 1753), Royal Navy officer
- Charles Brown (Medal of Honor, 1864) (1841–1919), American Civil War Medal of Honor recipient
- Charles Brown (marine) (1849–?), American 1871 Korean Expedition Marine and Medal of Honor recipient
- Charles Henry Brown (1872–1917), New Zealand Army officer who served during World War I
- Charles R. Brown (1899–1983), US Navy four-star admiral
- Charles Q. Brown Jr. (born 1962), chairman of the US Joint Chiefs of Staff
- Sir Charles Richmond Brown, 4th Baronet (1902–1995), British soldier

=== Politics ===
==== United States ====
- Charlie Brown (Georgia politician) (1903–1995), Atlanta politician for whom the airport Charlie Brown Field is named
- Charlie Brown (Indiana politician) (born 1938), Indiana state representative
- Charlie Brown (West Virginia politician) (born 1950), West Virginia attorney general
- Charles Brown (Pennsylvania politician) (1797–1883), U.S. representative from Pennsylvania
- Charles Brown (mayor) (1873–1943), mayor of Murray, Utah, 1906–1909
- Charles Brown (Wisconsin politician) (1828–?), Wisconsin state assemblyman
- Charles Elwood Brown (1834–1904), U.S. representative from Ohio
- Charles Harrison Brown (1920–2003), U.S. representative from Missouri
- Charles Henry Brown (politician) (1904–1959), Vermont lawyer and politician

==== Other countries ====
- Charles Brown (Australian politician) (1895–1970), Australian politician from Queensland
- Charles Brown (Labour politician) (1884–1940), British Labour Party member of parliament for Mansfield, 1929–1940
- Charles Brown (New Zealand politician) (1820–1901), from Taranaki
- Charles Hunter Brown (1825–1898), New Zealand politician from Canterbury

=== Religion ===
- Charles Arthur Brown (1919–1997), American auxiliary bishop of Santa Cruz, Bolivia
- Charles E. Brown Jr. (1911–1996), chief of chaplains of the U.S. Army
- Charles John Brown (born 1959), American Catholic archbishop and apostolic nuncio to the Philippines
- Charles John Brown (moderator) (1806–1884), Scottish minister
- Charles Oliver Brown (1848–1941), Congregational minister and bugler in the American Civil War
- Charles Reynolds Brown (1862–1950), American Congregational clergyman and educator
- Charles Rufus Brown (1849–1914), American Baptist clergyman and Semitic scholar

=== Sports ===
==== American football ====
- Charlie Brown (defensive back) (born 1942), National Football League and Canadian Football League player
- Charlie Brown (running back) (born 1945), National Football League player
- Charlie Brown (wide receiver, born 1948) (born 1948), National Football League player
- Charlie Brown (wide receiver, born 1958) (born 1958), National Football League player
- Charles Brown (offensive lineman) (born 1987), American football player
- Charles Edwin Brown (1936–2022), American football offensive lineman
- Charles H. Brown (American football) (1886–1963), American college football player and coach, judge

==== Association football ====
- Charles Brown (footballer), Scottish footballer who played for Tottenham
- Charlie Brown (footballer, born 1898) (1898–1979), English footballer with Southampton and Queens Park Rangers
- Charlie Brown (footballer, born 1999), English footballer with Milton Keynes Dons
- Charlie Brown (Scottish footballer) (1924–2019), Scottish footballer who played for Queen of the South

==== Australian rules football ====
- Charlie Brown (footballer, born 1896) (1896–1956), Australian rules footballer for Collingwood
- Charlie Brown (footballer, born 1873) (1873–1941), Australian rules footballer for Carlton

==== Other sports ====
- Charlie Brown (baseball) (1871–1938), American baseball player
- Charlie Brown Jr. (basketball) (born 1997), American professional basketball player
- Charlie Brown (basketball, born 1936) (1936–2022), American college basketball player
- Charles Brown (boxer) (born 1939), American Olympic bronze medalist
- Charlie Brown (boxer) (born 1958), American boxer
- Charles Brown (cricketer, born 1815) (1815–1875), English cricketer
- Charles Brown (cricketer, born 1854) (1854–1917), Australian-born English cricketer
- Charles Brown (ice hockey) (born 1947), American ice hockey player
- Charles Brown (roque player) (1867–1937), American Olympic bronze medalist
- Charles Brown (rugby union, born 1887) (1887–1966), New Zealand rugby union player
- Charlie Brown (rugby union, born 1878) (1878–1944), South African international rugby union player
- Charlie Brown (rugby union, born 1909) (1909–1976), Scottish rugby union player
- Charles Brown (water polo), New Zealand water polo player
- Charlie Brown (modern pentathlete) (born 2003), British modern pentathlete
- Charles Brown (pole vaulter) (born 1956), American pole vaulter, 1978 indoor All-American for the UCLA Bruins track and field team

=== Science and engineering ===
- Charles Brown (British engineer) (1827–1905), British engineer
- Charles Barrington Brown (1839–1917), British-Canadian geologist and explorer
- Charles D. Brown II, American physicist
- Charles Eugene Lancelot Brown (1863–1924), Swiss engineer and founder of railway companies

=== Other people ===
- Charles Armitage Brown (1787–1842), British businessman, friend of poet John Keats
- Charles E. Brown (photographer) (1896–1982), British commercial aviation photographer
- Charles F. Brown (1844–1929), American lawyer and judge
- Charles H. Brown (New York judge) (1858–1933), American lawyer and judge
- Charles Harvey Brown (1875–1960), American librarian
- Charles L. Brown (1921–2003), American businessman
- Charles N. Brown (1937–2009), American publisher, founder of magazine Locus
- Charles Philip Brown (1798–1884), British official of the East India Company
- Charles Stuart Brown (1918–1997), Wyoming Supreme Court judge
- Charles Brown (murderer) (1933–1962), American spree killer

== Songs ==
- "Charlie Brown" (The Coasters song), written by Leiber and Stoller, 1959
- "Charlie Brown" (Benito di Paula song), 1974
- "Charlie Brown" (Coldplay song), 2011
- "Charlie Brown", by Beabadoobee from Fake It Flowers, 2020

== Other uses ==
- Charlie Brown, Peanuts comic strip character
- You're a Good Man, Charlie Brown, the musical comedy based on the Peanuts comic strip
- Charles E. Brown Middle School, Newton, Massachusetts, US

== See also ==
- Chuck Brown (disambiguation)
- Charlie Brown's (disambiguation)
- Charles Browne (disambiguation)
- Carlos Brown (disambiguation)
- Charlotte Brown (disambiguation)
- Charles Wreford-Brown (1866–1951), British footballer
