= Keith G. Kautz =

American judge (born 1953)

Keith Kautz

Attorney General of Wyoming
- Incumbent
- Assumed office July 7, 2025
- Governor: Mark Gordon
- Preceded by: Ryan Schelhaas (acting)

Justice of the Wyoming Supreme Court
- In office August 4, 2015 – March 26, 2024
- Appointed by: Matt Mead
- Preceded by: Marilyn S. Kite
- Succeeded by: Robert Jarosh

Personal details
- Born: 1953 (age 72–73) Lyman, Nebraska, U.S.
- Party: Republican
- Education: University of Wyoming (BS, JD)

Keith G. Kautz (born 1953) is an American lawyer who served as a justice of the Wyoming Supreme Court from 2015 to 2024. He previously served as a judge of the Wyoming District Court from 1993 to 2015.

== Education and early career ==
Kautz grew up on farms near Lyman, Nebraska, and Huntley, Wyoming, and graduated from Torrington High School in Torrington, Wyoming. He earned a Bachelor of Science degree from the University of Wyoming in 1975, and a Juris Doctor from the University of Wyoming College of Law in 1978.

Kautz was in private practice in Wyoming from 1978 to 1993. He was an associate with the law firm Sawyer & Warren, and then a partner in the firm Sawyer, Warren & Kautz, in Torrington.

Governor Mike Sullivan appointed Kautz as a state judge in 1993, serving on the Wyoming District Courts for the Eighth District, which covers four counties: Converse, Goshen, Niobrara, and Platte. Kautz was retained by voters in 1994, 2000, 2006, and 2012. Kautz's father-in-law John Callahan, and grandfather-in-law, also served as Wyoming district court judges.

== Wyoming Supreme Court ==
In 2012, Justice Michael Golden retired from the Wyoming Supreme Court, and the Wyoming Judicial Nominating Commission put forward Kautz as one of three possible replacements. However, Governor Matt Mead did not choose Kautz, appointing Michael K. Davis instead.

In March 2015, Justice Marilyn S. Kite announced that she would retire on August 3. The Wyoming Judicial Nominating Commission again selected Kautz as one of the possible candidates for the Supreme Court, along with attorney Robert W. Tiedeken and Tom Lubnau, the former Speaker of the Wyoming House of Representatives. Governor Mead announced Kautz as his choice to replace Kite on June 5, 2015.

Kautz was sworn in as a justice of the Wyoming Supreme Court on August 4, 2015. He won a retention election to complete the rest of Kite's term in November 2016, winning 77% of the vote. His current term on the court expires on January 6, 2025.

In October 2023, it was announced that Kautz would retire from the bench on March 26, 2024.

Legal offices
Preceded by Marilyn S. Kite	Justice of the Wyoming Supreme Court; 2015–2024	Succeeded by Robert Jarosh
Preceded by Ryan Schelhaas; Acting	Attorney General of Wyoming; 2025–present	Incumbent
