= In re Neely =

2017 Wyoming Supreme Court case

- Court: Wyoming Supreme Court
- Decided: March 7, 2017
- Citation: 390 P.3d 728

Case history
- Subsequent actions: certiorari denied, 583 U.S. 1052

Court membership
- Chief judge: E. James Burke
- Associate judges: William U. Hill; Michael K. Davis; Kate M. Fox; Keith G. Kautz

Case opinions
- Majority: Fox, joined by Burke, Hill
- Dissent: Kautz, joined by Davis

Laws applied
- U.S. Const. amend. I; Wyo. Const. art. 1, § 18; Wyo. Const. art. 6, § 20; Wyo. Const. art. 21, § 25; Wyo. Code of Jud. Conduct, Rules 1.1, 1.2, 2.2, 2.3

In re Neely, 390 P.3d 728 (Wyo. 2017), (Note: Also referred to as Neely v. Wyoming Commission on Judicial Conduct and Ethics.) is a Wyoming Supreme Court case in which the court censured Ruth Neely, a local judge who publicly said that she would not perform same-sex marriages. Neely was appointed to a part-time magistrate judgeship in 2001. Following the United States Supreme Court's nationwide legalization of same-sex marriage, Neely told the press and a superior that, for religious reasons, she would not be willing to perform a same-sex marriage. Her superior suspended her and the Wyoming Commission of Judicial Conduct and Ethics found there was probable cause to believe Neely violated several parts of the Wyoming Code of Judicial Conduct. The commission recommended that Neely be expelled; Neely appealed the ruling to the Wyoming Supreme Court.

In a 3–2 decision, the Wyoming Supreme Court found that Neely had committed ethics violations, holding that her comments breached her duties to avoid impropriety and the appearance of it, to impartially and fairly uphold and execute the laws, and to perform her duties without bias or prejudice. However, the court chose to censure her rather than expel her. The dissent disagreed, arguing that the majority had penalized Neely for expression of her religious beliefs, highlighting that Neely had not been asked to perform a same-sex marriage and that her position only authorized her to perform marriages rather than mandating it. Several legal scholars criticized the decision, seeing it as an infringement on Neely's religious freedoms.

== Background ==
=== Facts ===
Under Wyoming law, marriage was defined as between one man and one woman, making same-sex marriage illegal. However, in 2014, the United States District Court for the District of Wyoming ordered an injunction in Guzzo v. Mead (2014), stopping Wyoming from enforcing that law; the court held that it violated the Due Process Clause and Equal Protection Clause of the Fourteenth Amendment. The next year, the Supreme Court of the United States came to the same conclusion, guaranteeing the right to same-sex marriage nationwide.

Ruth Neely was appointed to a municipal court judgeship by the mayor and city council of Pinedale, Wyoming in 1994. As part of her appointment, she took an oath to uphold the constitutions of Wyoming and the United States. In 2001, Neely was appointed to be a part-time magistrate judge; with this appointment, she gained the power to perform marriages. She was on the committee that adopted the 2009 edition of the Wyoming Code of Judicial Conduct.

Neely was a member of the Lutheran Church – Missouri Synod; she believed that same-sex marriage is a sin and that marriage is only available to opposite-sex couples. Shortly after the injunction in Guzzo, Neely informed Circuit Court Judge Curt Haws that she would not be willing to marry same-sex couples. When asked by a Pinedale Roundup reporter if she was excited to marry same-sex couples, she responded that she would not do so, although other magistrate judges would. She also commented that she had not yet been asked to perform a same-sex marriage. Her remarks were published in the paper.

The Wyoming Commission of Judicial Conduct and Ethics contacted Neely after they became aware of her comments. She confirmed that their information was correct, reiterating her belief that homosexuality is a sin and comparing it to lying and stealing. Haws suspended Neely in January 2015, and the commission had determined that there was probable cause to believe Neely had violated the Wyoming Code of Judicial Conduct. Following a report from its Adjudicatory Panel, the commission voted to adopt its findings, recommending that Neely be expelled from the judiciary. Neely appealed the recommendation to the Wyoming Supreme Court.

=== Law ===
The First Amendment to the United States Constitution guarantees the right to freedom of speech and freedom of religion. However, judges are subjected to a heightened standard of ethics to maintain public trust in the fairness and integrity of the judiciary. In Wyoming, those ethical standards are enshrined in the Wyoming Code of Judicial Conduct, which requires that:

- Rule 1.1: Judges must comply with the law, including the Code of Judicial Conduct.
- Rule 1.2: Judges must act in a manner that maintains public confidence in the judiciary, and they must avoid "impropriety and the appearance of impropriety".
  The comments on this rule specify that the test to apply it involves determining "whether the conduct would create in reasonable minds a perception that the judge violated this Code or engaged in other conduct that reflects adversely on the judge's honesty, impartiality, temperament, or fitness to serve as a judge."
- Rule 2.2: Judges must impartially and fairly uphold and execute the laws.
  The comments clarify "Although each judge comes to the bench with a unique background and personal philosophy, a judge must interpret and apply the law without regard to whether the judge approves or disapproves of the law in question."
- Rule 2.3: Judges (a) must perform their duties without bias or prejudice, and (b) must not perform their duties in a way that "manifest[s] bias or prejudice, or engage in harassment, including but not limited to bias, prejudice, or harassment based upon ... sex, gender, ... sexual orientation, [or] marital status" and prevent subordinates from doing the same.
  The comments extend the rule to any conduct that "may reasonably be perceived as prejudiced or biased".

In the aftermath of the federal courts' decisions legalizing same-sex marriage, states other than Wyoming passed laws looking to allow individuals to refuse to perform same-sex marriages for personal religious reasons. In Utah, North Carolina, and several other states, for example, the law made it permissible for a county clerk to refuse to perform a same-sex marriage as long as they provide another person to perform it during business hours. Ethics boards in Oregon and Washington, however, voted to sanction judges for not performing same-sex marriages, while boards in several other states concluded in advisory opinions that such conduct would be sanctionable. In Kentucky, county clerk Kim Davis caused controversy when she refused to sign off on same-sex marriages; the debate drew national attention, ultimately resulting in Davis taking her name off of marriage licenses.

== Legal proceedings ==
=== Arguments ===
Neely argued that she did not violate Rules 1.1 and 1.2 because her authority to solemnize marriages was discretionary – she was not required to perform any. She also argued that performance of a marriage implies an endorsement of it, which she could not be forced to do, and that no harm had been done because she would be willing to perform other judicial tasks for same-sex couples and help them find other judges willing to perform the marriage.

Regarding Rules 2.2 and 2.3, Neely argued that she had a right to refuse to perform same-sex marriages as an expression of her religious beliefs. She added that her actions did not reflect any prejudice against same-sex couples, only her religious views. The commission countered that Neely should be removed under the Judicial Code of Conduct because she had manifested bias against others on the basis of sexual orientation. During oral arguments, a lawyer from the commission referred to the case as "a low point and a black mark in the history of the judiciary in Wyoming".

Neely was represented by James Campbell, an attorney from the Alliance Defending Freedom, before the Wyoming Supreme Court; the commission was represented by Patrick Dixon. The National Black Church Initiative spoke in support of Neely's position, as did a group of Pinedale elected officials and judges. The Becket Fund for Religious Liberty and a group of Wyoming state and federal lawmakers attempted to file amicus briefs supporting her, but the court rejected their attempts. Jason Marsden, then the executive director of the Matthew Shepard Foundation, supported the commission's position.

=== Majority ruling ===
The court's majority opinion released on March 7, 2017, was authored by Justice Kate M. Fox for herself, Chief Justice E. James Burke, and Justice William U. Hill. The court found that Neely did not violate Rule 1.1, but she did violate Rules 1.2, 2.2, and 2.3(b); however, the court rejected the Commission's recommendation that Neely be removed, choosing instead to censure her. With regard to Rule 1.1, the court found that the requirement that judges comply with the law refers mostly to criminal law, and only sometimes to very clear instances of refusing to enforce or comply with a rule in their judicial capacity. Because marriages are discretionary, the court found, Neely had not broken the law; however, the court did say that Neely did violate Rule 1.1 inasmuch as she had violated other rules.

As for Rule 1.2, the court found that while Neely and the commission contested which standard the rule should be applied in – citing different states' caselaw – their suggestions were essentially the same objective standard of reasonableness articulated in the comments of the Wyoming code. The court Neely's argument that her performance was discretionary, finding that Neely's duty to avoid the appearance of impropriety also extends to her discretionary tasks. The court also found that, contrary to Neely's argument, a judge can officiate a marriage without endorsing it, reasoning that it is only a civil contract. As such, the court found that a reasonable person would see Neely's comments as casting doubt on her impartiality.

The court's analysis of Rules 2.2 and 2.3(b) revolved around whether Neely was entitled to not perform same-sex marriages, and announce as much, as an expression of her religious beliefs. The court held that she was, finding that she had improperly let her religious beliefs supersede her commitment to neutral application of the law and application without bias. The court held that Neely's conduct "may reasonably be perceived to be biased" and that she could not exclude people in her judicial duties based on sexual orientation.

Neely petitioned the U.S. Supreme Court for certiorari, asking for a review of her case. The Supreme Court denied her petition in January 2018.

=== Dissent ===
Justice Keith G. Kautz dissented from the majority opinion, joined by Justice Michael K. Davis. Kautz wrote that Neely had not violated the Code of Judicial Conduct; he disagreed with the majority's finding that a judge is required to perform marriages regardless of sexual orientation, arguing that the task is discretionary in Wyoming and that the legalization of gay marriage does not change that. Regarding Rule 1.2, Kautz wrote that the majority's ruling would require a judge to perform any same-sex marriage on request, and that the majority had effectively imposed a religious test against judges opposed to same-sex marriage for religious reasons. He also argued that while the majority claimed to be applying an objective test, it was really applying a subjective standard based on Neely's thoughts, and that no reasonable person would see her comments as giving the appearance of impropriety or undermining public confidence in the judiciary. Regarding Rules 2.2 and 2.3(b), the dissent held that Neely was simply expressing her religious beliefs, and also argued that those rules should not apply because Neely had not been asked to solemnize any same-sex marriages.

== Reaction ==
Several legal scholars criticized the court's holding, finding it to be hostile to Neely's First Amendment rights. Gerard V. Bradley wrote in the Texas Review of Law and Politics that the ethics commission had recommended to remove Neely for "possessing, or at least for being known to possess, the religious belief of her church that marriage is a relationship which by its natural orientation towards procreation is limited to unions of a man and a woman", summarizing the commission's position to be "Judge Neely is unfit because she is a Lutheran". Michael S. McGinniss, writing in the Harvard Journal of Law & Public Policy, quoted Bradley approvingly, adding that "socially conservative lawyers should take no comfort from assurances that state bar authorities with limited resources will not prosecute them for 'manifest[ing] bias or prejudice' in expressing disfavored traditional viewpoints on matters of sexual ethics, or that either those authorities or the courts will respect their freedoms under the First Amendment or their state constitutions." Judge Vance D. Day – who was himself suspended by the Oregon Supreme Court for announcing his refusal to perform same-sex marriages, among other things – wrote that "sanctioning a judge for no other crime than speaking one's mind about the conflict between the law and the free exercise of religion is tantamount to enforcing thought conformity".

Keeley O. Cronin, by contrast, agreed with the court's judgment on Rules 1.1 and 1.2 and the resulting sanction, arguing in the Wyoming Law Review that "the law does not require judges and magistrates to perform every marriage ceremony, yet it does require judges and magistrates to refrain from discriminating on the basis of race, gender, religion, sex, sexual orientation, or other protected classes". However, he disagreed with the court's application of Rules 2.2 and 2.3(b), writing that comments to newspapers should not be considered performance of judicial duties. Because Neely had not actually been asked to perform a same-sex marriage, Cronin wrote, she should not have been found in violation of those rules. However, he argued that the rules should be updated to cover that behavior in the future.

== See also ==
- List of Wyoming Supreme Court casesd
