= List of first women lawyers and judges in Wyoming =

This is a list of the first women lawyer(s) and judge(s) in Wyoming. It includes the year in which the women were admitted to practice law (in parentheses). Also included are women who achieved other distinctions such becoming the first in their state to graduate from law school or become a political figure.

== Firsts in Wyoming's history ==
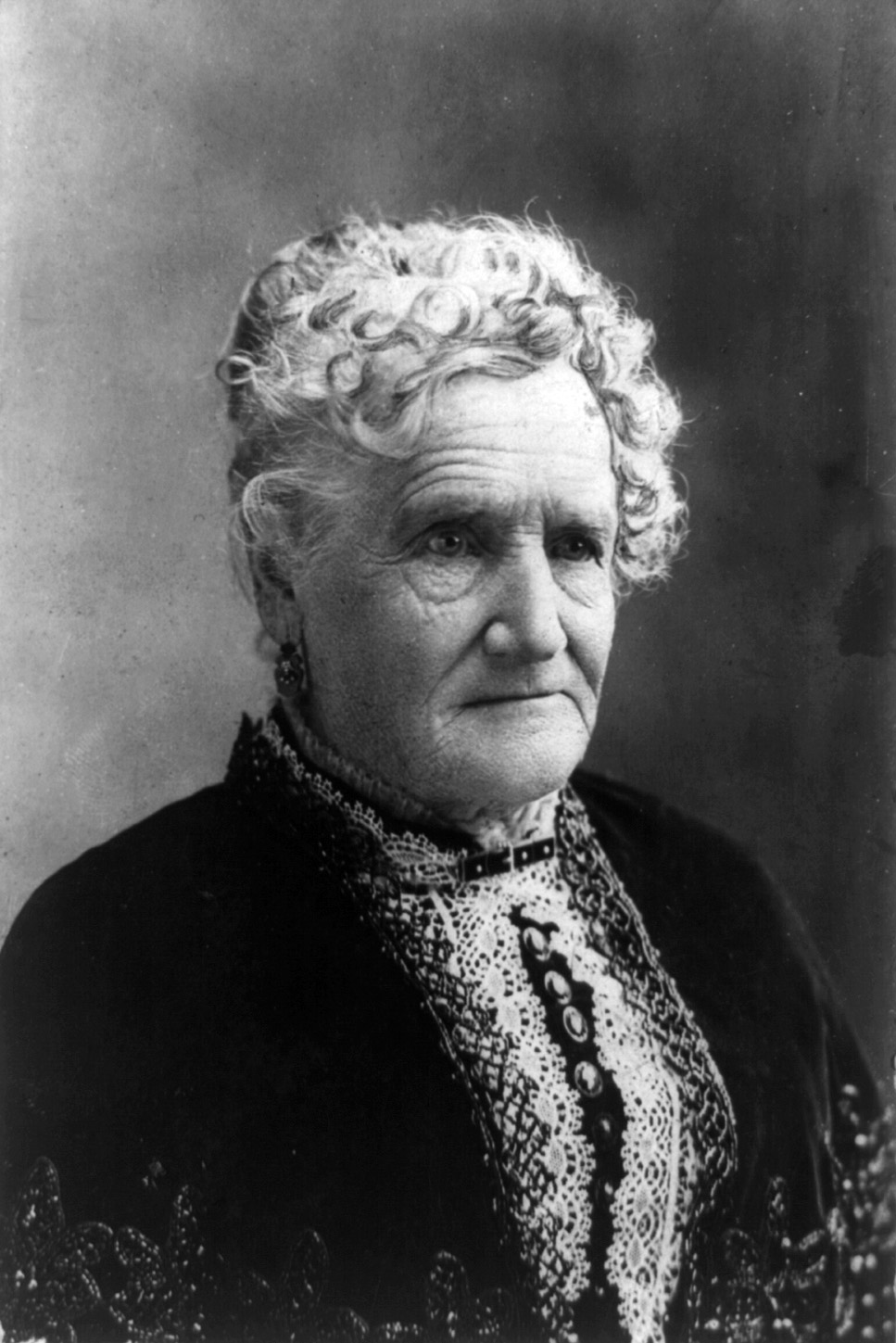
Esther Morris: First female to serve as a judicial officer in the United States (1870)

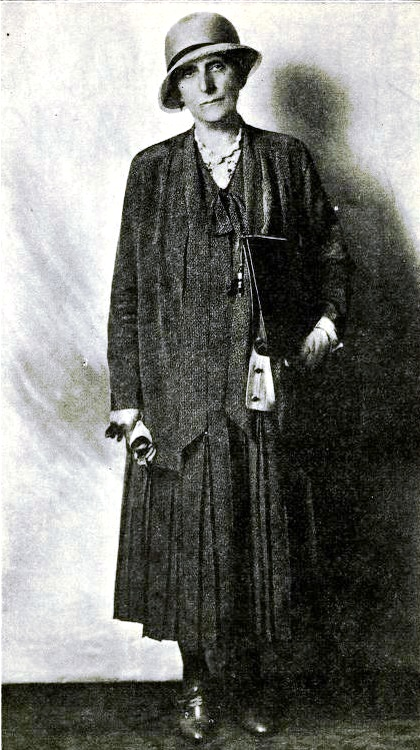
Grace Raymond Hebard: First female lawyer in Wyoming (1898)

=== Lawyers ===
- First female: Grace Raymond Hebard (1898)
- First Latino American female: Martha Lee Ramirez (1930)
- First female to argue a case before the Wyoming Supreme Court: Laura Bicknell Harris in 1927
- First female (prosecutor): Nancy Guthrie in 1978

=== State judges ===
- First female (justice of the peace): Esther Hobart Morris in 1870
- First female (county judge): Betty Kail (1953) in 1981
- First female (district court): Betty Kail (1953) in 1983
- First female (Wyoming Supreme Court): Marilyn S. Kite in 2000

=== Federal judges ===
- First female (U.S. District Court for the District of Wyoming): Nancy D. Freudenthal (1980) in 2010

=== Attorney General of Wyoming ===
- First female: Gay Woodhouse (1977) from 1999-2001

=== Deputy Attorney General ===
- First female: Ellen Crowley-Suyematsu in 1959

=== County Attorney ===
- First female: Nancy Guthrie in 1978

=== Political Office ===
- First Native American (female) (Wyoming Senate): Affie Ellis in 2017

=== Wyoming Bar Association ===
- First female (president): Catherine "Cathy" McPherson from 2000-2001

== Firsts in local history ==
- Nancy Guthrie: First female to serve as the County Attorney in Big Horn County, Wyoming (1978)
- Mary B. Guthrie: First female to serve as the City Attorney for Cheyenne, Wyoming [Laramie County, Wyoming]
- Lucky McMahon: First female to serve as the County Attorney for Sublette County, Wyoming (2008)
- Erin Weisman: First female to serve as the County Attorney for Teton County, Wyoming (2018)

== See also ==
- List of first women lawyers and judges in the United States
- Timeline of women lawyers in the United States
- Women in law
