= Bridget Hill (politician) =

American lawyer (born 1974)

Justice of the Wyoming Supreme Court
- Incumbent
- Assumed office May 28, 2025
- Appointed by: Mark Gordon
- Preceded by: Kate M. Fox

38th Attorney General of Wyoming
- In office March 1, 2019 – May 28, 2025
- Governor: Mark Gordon
- Preceded by: Peter K. Michael
- Succeeded by: Ryan Schelhaas (acting)

Personal details
- Born: 1974 (age 51–52) Laramie, Wyoming, U.S.
- Party: Republican
- Education: University of Wyoming (BA, JD)

Bridget L. Hill is an American attorney and politician from Wyoming. She has served as a justice of the Wyoming Supreme Court since 2025. She previously served as the attorney general of Wyoming from 2019 to 2025.

== Early life and education ==
Hill was raised on a ranch near Saratoga, Wyoming. She earned a Bachelor of Arts and a Juris Doctor from the University of Wyoming College of Law.

== Career ==
Hill clerked for Justices Larry Lehman and Michael Golden of the Wyoming Supreme Court.

In 2013, Governor Matt Mead appointed Hill the director of the Office of State Lands and Investments.

In November 2018, Governor-elect Mark Gordon announced Hill as his nominee for attorney general, pending approval by the Wyoming Legislature, to succeed Peter K. Michael. She was sworn into office on March 1, 2019. On January 29, 2021, Hill announced that her office would not pursue criminal charges against Joseph Hubert Hart, a retired Catholic bishop accused of sexual abuse.

Hill was appointed to a seat on the Wyoming Supreme Court effective May 28, 2025.

Legal offices
Preceded by Peter K. Michael	Attorney General of Wyoming; 2019–2025	Succeeded by Ryan Schelhaas; Acting
Preceded by Kate M. Fox	Justice of the Wyoming Supreme Court; 2025–present	Incumbent
