= Kate M. Fox =

American judge (born 1955)

Kate Fox

Chief Justice of the Wyoming Supreme Court
- In office July 1, 2021 – May 27, 2025
- Preceded by: Michael K. Davis
- Succeeded by: Lynne J. Boomgaarden

Justice of the Wyoming Supreme Court
- In office January 3, 2014 – May 27, 2025
- Appointed by: Matt Mead
- Preceded by: Barton R. Voigt
- Succeeded by: Bridget Hill

Personal details
- Born: 1955 (age 70–71)
- Education: University of Wyoming (BA, JD)

Kate M. Fox (born 1955) is an American lawyer who served as the chief justice of the Wyoming Supreme Court from 2021 to 2025. She served as a justice of the court from 2014 to 2025.

Fox moved to Wyoming when she was 16, after her family bought a ranch near Dubois. She completed a Bachelor of Arts degree at the University of Wyoming in 1976, and a Juris Doctor at the University of Wyoming College of Law in 1989. She was editor-in-chief of the Land & Water Law Review. Fox clerked for federal judge Clarence Addison Brimmer Jr., of the United States District Court for the District of Wyoming, in 1989–90.

Fox was in private practice from 1990 to 2013 with the law firm Davis & Cannon in Cheyenne, Wyoming. She specialized in employment law and natural resources law. Fox also served for five years on the Wyoming State Bar Board of Professional Responsibility, and on the Standing Committee on Local Rules for the U.S. District Court for Wyoming.

In August 2013, Justice Barton R. Voigt announced his retirement. The Wyoming Judicial nominating commission submitted the names of three possible replacements to the Governor Matt Mead. Fox was one of the candidates, along with attorneys Patrick R. Day and Robert Tiedeken.

Governor Matt Mead announced on November 21, 2013, that he had selected Fox for the vacancy. She is the second woman appointed to the Wyoming Supreme Court, after Marilyn S. Kite. Fox began her service on the court in January 2014.

Fox won a retention election in 2016, with 76% of the vote, to complete the remaining two years of Justice Voigt's term. She was re-elected to a new eight-year term in November 2018. On July 1, 2021, Fox became Chief Justice after Michael K. Davis's term as Chief Justice ended. She is the second woman Chief Justice in Wyoming history.

== Notable decisions ==
- In re Neely, 390 P.3d 728 (holding that a judge had violated Wyoming's code of judicial ethics by announcing that she would not perform same-sex marriages)

Legal offices
Preceded by Barton R. Voigt	Justice of the Wyoming Supreme Court; 2014–2025	Succeeded by Bridget Hill
Preceded by Michael K. Davis	Chief Justice of the Wyoming Supreme Court; 2021–2025	Succeeded by Lynne J. Boomgaarden
