= Courts of Wyoming =

List of courts in US state

Courts of Wyoming include:

State courts of Wyoming

- Wyoming Supreme Court
  - Wyoming District Courts (9 districts)
  - Wyoming Chancery Court
    - Wyoming Circuit Courts

Federal courts located in Wyoming

- United States District Court for the District of Wyoming
