= John G. Fenn =

American judge

John Fenn

Justice of the Wyoming Supreme Court
- Incumbent
- Assumed office January 17, 2022
- Appointed by: Mark Gordon
- Preceded by: Michael K. Davis

Personal details
- Education: University of Wyoming (BA, JD); Air University (MS)

John G. Fenn is an American lawyer who has served as a justice of the Wyoming Supreme Court since 2022. He served as a state court judge from 2007 to 2022.

== Education and legal career ==
Fenn graduated from Big Piney High School. He received his Bachelor of Arts from the University of Wyoming in 1984, Master of Science in engineering from the Air Force Institute of Technology of Air University in 1989, and his Juris Doctor from the University of Wyoming College of Law in 1993. From 1993 to 2006, he was a partner with the law firm Yonkee & Toner.

== Judicial career ==
=== State judicial service ===
From 2007 to 2022, Fenn served as a judge of the Wyoming Fourth Judicial District Court. From 2019 to 2022, he was involved in the development of Wyoming's chancery court.

=== Appointment to Wyoming Supreme Court ===
Fenn was first considered for appointment to the Supreme Court in September 2018 to fill the vacancy left by the retirement of justice E. James Burke, the seat was ultimately filled by Kari Jo Gray. In November 2021, Fenn was among three candidates who were recommended to the governor to fill the upcoming Supreme Court vacancy. On December 2, 2021, Governor Mark Gordon announced the appointment of Fenn to be a justice of the Wyoming Supreme Court to fill the vacancy left by the retirement of justice Michael K. Davis on January 16, 2022. The appointment is effective January 17, 2022.

Legal offices
Preceded by Michael K. Davis	Justice of the Wyoming Supreme Court; 2022–present	Incumbent
