= 2024 Wyoming judicial elections =

- November 5, 2024

Judicial retention elections in Wyoming were held throughout the state on November 5, 2024. A total of thirty judges were up for election, including two Supreme Court justices for 8-year terms, fourteen circuit court judges for 4-year terms, and fourteen district court judges for 6-year terms. Circuit Court judge Thomas Lee originally stood for retention, but retired before the election. Governor Mark Gordon appointed TJ Forwood to fill the subsequent vacancy.

== Supreme Court justices ==
=== John G. Fenn ===
John G. Fenn retention results by county Yes: 70–80%; 80–90%

Justice John G. Fenn retention election (8-year term)
Choice	Votes	%
Yes	175,991	77.74%
No	50,382	22.26%
Valid votes	226,373	83.49%
Invalid or blank votes	44,750	16.51%
Total votes	271,123	100.00%

=== Kate M. Fox ===
Kate M. Fox retention results by county Yes: 70–80%; 80–90%

Chief Justice Kate M. Fox retention election (8-year term)
Choice	Votes	%
Yes	177,803	78.64%
No	48,638	21.36%
Valid votes	226,441	83.52%
Invalid or blank votes	44,682	16.48%
Total votes	271,123	100.00%

== District judges ==
Map of judicial districts (click on links to skip to results)

=== First judicial district ===
Circuit Court Judge Antoinette Williams retention election (4-year term)
Choice	Votes	%
Yes	29,124	73.70%
No	10,394	26.30%
Valid votes	39,518	90.62%
Invalid or blank votes	4,089	9.38%
Total votes	43,607	100.00%

=== Second judicial district ===
District Court Judge Dawnessa A. Snyder retention election (6-year term)
Choice	Votes	%
Yes	15,656	78.38%
No	4,319	21.62%
Valid votes	19,975	81.72%
Invalid or blank votes	4,464	18.28%
Total votes	24,439	100.00%

District Court Judge Melissa Westby retention election (6-year term)
Choice	Votes	%
Yes	14,709	74.21%
No	5,112	25.79%
Valid votes	19,821	81.10%
Invalid or blank votes	4,618	18.90%
Total votes	24,439	100.00%

Circuit Court Judge Susan K. Stipe retention election (4-year term)
Choice	Votes	%
Yes	15,579	79.18%
No	4,096	20.82%
Valid votes	19,675	80.51%
Invalid or blank votes	4,764	19.49%
Total votes	24,439	100.00%

=== Third judicial district ===
District Court Judge James Kaste retention election (6-year term)
Choice	Votes	%
Yes	23,720	78.32%
No	6,564	21.68%
Valid votes	30,284	82.01%
Invalid or blank votes	6,645	17.99%
Total votes	36,929	100.00%

Circuit Court Judge Susan K. Stipe retention election (4-year term)
Choice	Votes	%
Yes	24,280	79.46%
No	6,276	20.54%
Valid votes	30,556	82.74%
Invalid or blank votes	6,373	17.26%
Total votes	36,929	100.00%

Circuit Court Judge Gregory S. Corpening retention election (4-year term)
Choice	Votes	%
Yes	23,914	79.19%
No	6,284	20.81%
Valid votes	30,198	81.77%
Invalid or blank votes	6,731	18.23%
Total votes	36,929	100.00%

=== Fourth judicial district ===
District Court Judge Darci AV Phillips retention election (6-year term)
Choice	Votes	%
Yes	15,148	83.54%
No	2,985	16.46%
Valid votes	18,133	84.21%
Invalid or blank votes	3,399	15.79%
Total votes	21,532	100.00%

District Court Judge Benjamin Kirven retention election (6-year term)
Choice	Votes	%
Yes	15,009	82.97%
No	3,081	17.03%
Valid votes	18,090	84.01%
Invalid or blank votes	3,442	15.99%
Total votes	21,532	100.00%

=== Fifth judicial district ===
District Court Judge Bill Simpson retention election (6-year term)
Choice	Votes	%
Yes	21,116	83.37%
No	4,212	16.63%
Valid votes	25,328	86.67%
Invalid or blank votes	3,896	13.33%
Total votes	29,224	100.00%

Circuit Court Judge Edward G. Luhm retention election (4-year term)
Choice	Votes	%
Yes	19,848	83.08%
No	4,043	16.92%
Valid votes	23,891	81.75%
Invalid or blank votes	5,333	18.25%
Total votes	29,224	100.00%

Circuit Court Judge S. Joseph "Joey" Darrah retention election (4-year term)
Choice	Votes	%
Yes	19,881	80.15%
No	4,923	19.85%
Valid votes	24,804	84.88%
Invalid or blank votes	4,420	15.12%
Total votes	29,224	100.00%

=== Sixth judicial district ===
District Court Judge Matthew FG Castano retention election (6-year term)
Choice	Votes	%
Yes	17,229	79.52%
No	4,436	20.48%
Valid votes	21,665	81.53%
Invalid or blank votes	4,686	18.47%
Total votes	26,351	100.00%

District Court Judge James Michael Causey retention election (6-year term)
Choice	Votes	%
Yes	16,667	77.79%
No	4,760	22.21%
Valid votes	21,427	81.31%
Invalid or blank votes	4,924	18.69%
Total votes	26,351	100.00%

Circuit Court Judge Wendy M. Bartlett retention election (4-year term)
Choice	Votes	%
Yes	16,951	77.59%
No	4,897	22.41%
Valid votes	21,848	82.91%
Invalid or blank votes	4,503	17.09%
Total votes	26,351	100.00%

Circuit Court Judge Lynda R. Bush retention election (4-year term)
Choice	Votes	%
Yes	16,740	78.18%
No	4,671	21.82%
Valid votes	21,411	81.25%
Invalid or blank votes	4,940	18.75%
Total votes	26,351	100.00%

=== Seventh judicial district ===
District Court Judge Catherine E. Wilking retention election (6-year term)
Choice	Votes	%
Yes	22,056	77.48%
No	6,412	22.52%
Valid votes	28,468	83.23%
Invalid or blank votes	5,738	16.77%
Total votes	34,206	100.00%

District Court Judge Joshua C. Eames retention election (6-year term)
Choice	Votes	%
Yes	20,993	76.29%
No	6,523	23.71%
Valid votes	27,516	80.44%
Invalid or blank votes	6,690	19.56%
Total votes	34,206	100.00%

Circuit Court Judge Brian Christensen retention election (4-year term)
Choice	Votes	%
Yes	21,948	78.37%
No	6,056	21.63%
Valid votes	28,004	81.87%
Invalid or blank votes	6,202	18.13%
Total votes	34,206	100.00%

Circuit Court Judge Nichole R. Collier retention election (4-year term)
Choice	Votes	%
Yes	21,807	78.54%
No	5,957	21.46%
Valid votes	27,764	81.17%
Invalid or blank votes	6,442	18.83%
Total votes	34,206	100.00%

Circuit Court Judge Kevin Taheri retention election (4-year term)
Choice	Votes	%
Yes	21,523	76.68%
No	6,546	23.32%
Valid votes	28,069	82.06%
Invalid or blank votes	6,137	17.94%
Total votes	34,206	100.00%

=== Eighth judicial district ===
District Court Judge Edward A. Buchanan retention election (6-year term)
Choice	Votes	%
Yes	13,680	82.04%
No	2,995	17.96%
Valid votes	16,675	87.56%
Invalid or blank votes	2,368	12.44%
Total votes	19,043	100.00%

District Court Judge F. Scott Peasley retention election (6-year term)
Choice	Votes	%
Yes	13,890	82.59%
No	2,927	17.41%
Valid votes	16,817	88.31%
Invalid or blank votes	2,226	11.69%
Total votes	19,043	100.00%

Circuit Court Judge Nathaniel Scott Hibben retention election (4-year term)
Choice	Votes	%
Yes	13,681	83.26%
No	2,750	16.74%
Valid votes	16,431	86.28%
Invalid or blank votes	2,612	13.72%
Total votes	19,043	100.00%

=== Ninth judicial district ===
District Court Judge Melissa M. Owens retention election (6-year term)
Choice	Votes	%
Yes	23,820	82.09%
No	5,196	17.91%
Valid votes	29,016	81.07%
Invalid or blank votes	6,776	18.93%
Total votes	35,792	100.00%

District Court Judge Katharine G. McKay retention election (6-year term)
Choice	Votes	%
Yes	22,970	82.51%
No	4,868	17.49%
Valid votes	27,838	77.78%
Invalid or blank votes	7,954	22.22%
Total votes	35,792	100.00%

Circuit Court Judge Daniel M. Stebner retention election (4-year term)
Choice	Votes	%
Yes	22,341	81.62%
No	5,032	18.38%
Valid votes	27,373	76.48%
Invalid or blank votes	8,419	23.52%
Total votes	35,792	100.00%

Circuit Court Judge John LaBuda retention election (4-year term)
Choice	Votes	%
Yes	21,764	80.23%
No	5,363	19.77%
Valid votes	27,127	75.79%
Invalid or blank votes	8,665	24.21%
Total votes	35,792	100.00%
