= G. Joseph Cardine =

American judge (1924–1997)

Justice of Wyoming Supreme Court
- In office 1983–1994
- Appointed by: Edgar Herschler

Personal details
- Born: July 6, 1924 Prairie du Chien, Wisconsin
- Died: July 22, 1997 (aged 73)

Godfrey Joseph Cardine (July 6, 1924 – July 22, 1997) was an American jurist who served as a justice of the Wyoming Supreme Court from June 13, 1983 to July 22, 1994.

== Early life, education, and military service ==
Born in Prairie du Chien, Wisconsin, to Joseph Frederick Cardine and Mary Kasparek, Cardine attended east Rockford High School in Illinois, graduating in 1942. He joined the United States Air Force during World War II, serving in the Asiatic-Pacific Theater from 1943 to 1946, and achieving the rank of First Lieutenant. He received a degree in structural engineering from the University of Illinois in 1948, and moved to Wyoming to work in that field for the company that later became Texaco. He attended law school there, receiving his Juris Doctor, with honors, from the University of Wyoming College of Law in 1954.

== Legal career ==
After working as a Natrona County justice of the peace from 1955 to 1956, and as municipal judge from 1961 to 1963, Cardine entered private practice in Casper, Wyoming, in 1966, becoming as a partner in the firm of Cardine, Vlastos and Reeves. He also served as the Natrona County District Attorney from 1966 to 1970. He continued in practice until 1977, when he accepted a full-time position on the faculty of the University of Wyoming College of Law.

On June 13, 1983, Governor Edgar Herschler appointed Cardine to a seat on the Wyoming Supreme Court. He became chief justice on June 30, 1988, serving in that capacity until June 30, 1990. During his tenure as Chief Justice, he initiated an alternative dispute resolution program as well as arranged meetings between himself, legislative leaders, and the Governor to exchange ideas on how to better serve the state. While continuing to serve on the court in 1993, Cardine helped to establish the Trial Lawyers College with Gerry Spence. He retired from the court on his 70th birthday, in 1994.

In addition to his legal activities, he was an organizer of the Bank of Casper and the Security Bank of Glenrock, Wyoming.

== Personal life ==
Cardine married Janice Irene Brown in 1946, with whom he had two daughters and a son. He also operated a ranch near Casper.

He died at the Wyoming Medical Center after what was described as a short illness, and was buried in Casper.

Political offices
Preceded by John F. Raper	Justice of the Wyoming Supreme Court; 1983–1994	Succeeded by Larry Lehman
