= John F. Raper =

American judge (1913–1993)

John F. Raper, Jr.

Judge of the Wyoming Supreme Court
- In office December 18, 1974 – June 14, 1983
- Appointed by: Stanley K. Hathaway
- Preceded by: John Joseph McIntyre
- Succeeded by: G. Joseph Cardine

Wyoming Attorney General
- In office 1963–1965
- Governor: Clifford Hansen
- Preceded by: Norman B. Gray
- Succeeded by: Milward Simpson

United States Attorney for the District of Wyoming
- In office 1953–1961
- President: Dwight D. Eisenhower
- Preceded by: John J. Hickey
- Succeeded by: Robert N. Chaffin

Personal details
- Born: June 13, 1913 Mapleton, Iowa, U.S.
- Died: June 10, 1993 (aged 79) Cheyenne, Wyoming, U.S.
- Resting place: Sheridan Municipal Cemetery, Sheridan, Wyoming, U.S.
- Party: Republican
- Spouse: Nellie Marie Chesler Raper
- Parent: John F. Raper Sr. (father)
- Education: University of Wyoming College of Law (JD)

Military service
- Allegiance: United States
- Branch/service: Wyoming Army National Guard
- Years of service: 1937-1960
- Rank: Colonel
- Unit: 115th Cavalry Regiment; 300th Armored Field Artillery Battalion
- Battles/wars: Korean War

John Frederick Raper Jr. (June 13, 1913 – June 10, 1993) was a justice of the Wyoming Supreme Court from December 18, 1974, to June 14, 1983.

Born in Mapleton, Iowa, Raper received his Juris Doctor from the University of Wyoming in 1936 and undertook the practice of law in Sheridan, Wyoming.

He served from 1937 to 1960 in the Wyoming Army National Guard, where he became a colonel. He was in the 115th Cavalry Regiment and during the Korean War, he was the commander of the 300th Armored Field Artillery Battalion, known as the "Cowboy Cannoneers". While in Korea, the 300th Armored Field Artillery Battalion fought with distinction and earned the Distinguished Unit Citation.

He also maintained his law practice into the 1950s.

In 1954, Raper was appointed United States Attorney for Wyoming.

He was then Wyoming Attorney General, and a Wyoming district court judge until he was appointed by to the Wyoming Supreme Court, on December 18, 1974, by Governor Stanley K. Hathaway. Raper served until his retirement, on June 14, 1983.

After a decade in retirement, Raper died in Cheyenne, Wyoming on June 10, 1993. Having also been a colonel in the Wyoming National Guard, the National Guard armory in Cheyenne is named for him.

Political offices
Preceded by John J. McIntyre	Justice of the Wyoming Supreme Court; 1974–1983	Succeeded by G. Joseph Cardine
