= Larry Lehman =

American judge (1945–2004)

Chief Justice of Wyoming
- In office 2000 – June 30, 2002
- Preceded by: William A. Taylor
- Succeeded by: William U. Hill

Justice of the Wyoming Supreme Court
- In office July 8, 1994 – December 10, 2004
- Appointed by: Mike Sullivan
- Preceded by: G. Joseph Cardine
- Succeeded by: E. James Burke

Personal details
- Born: 1945 Iowa City, Iowa
- Died: December 10, 2004 (aged 59)

Larry Lee Lehman (July 8, 1945 – December 10, 2004) was a chief justice of the Wyoming Supreme Court.

Born in Iowa City, Iowa, Lehman received a JD from the University of Wyoming College of Law in 1976. He practiced with the firm of Vehar, Lehman, Beppler & Jacobson, P.C., in Evanston, Wyoming.

He served as a judge in Uinta County, Wyoming, from 1985 to 1988, and as a state district judge for Albany and Carbon counties. On July 8, 1994, Governor Mike Sullivan appointed Lehman was to a seat on the Wyoming Supreme Court. Lehman became chief justice in 2000, and was the first chief justice to serve a four-year term. He died from brain cancer, a month before he was scheduled to step down.

Political offices
Preceded by G. Joseph Cardine	Justice of the Wyoming Supreme Court; 1994–2004	Succeeded by E. James Burke
