= Independence Slab =

- U.S. National Register of Historic Places
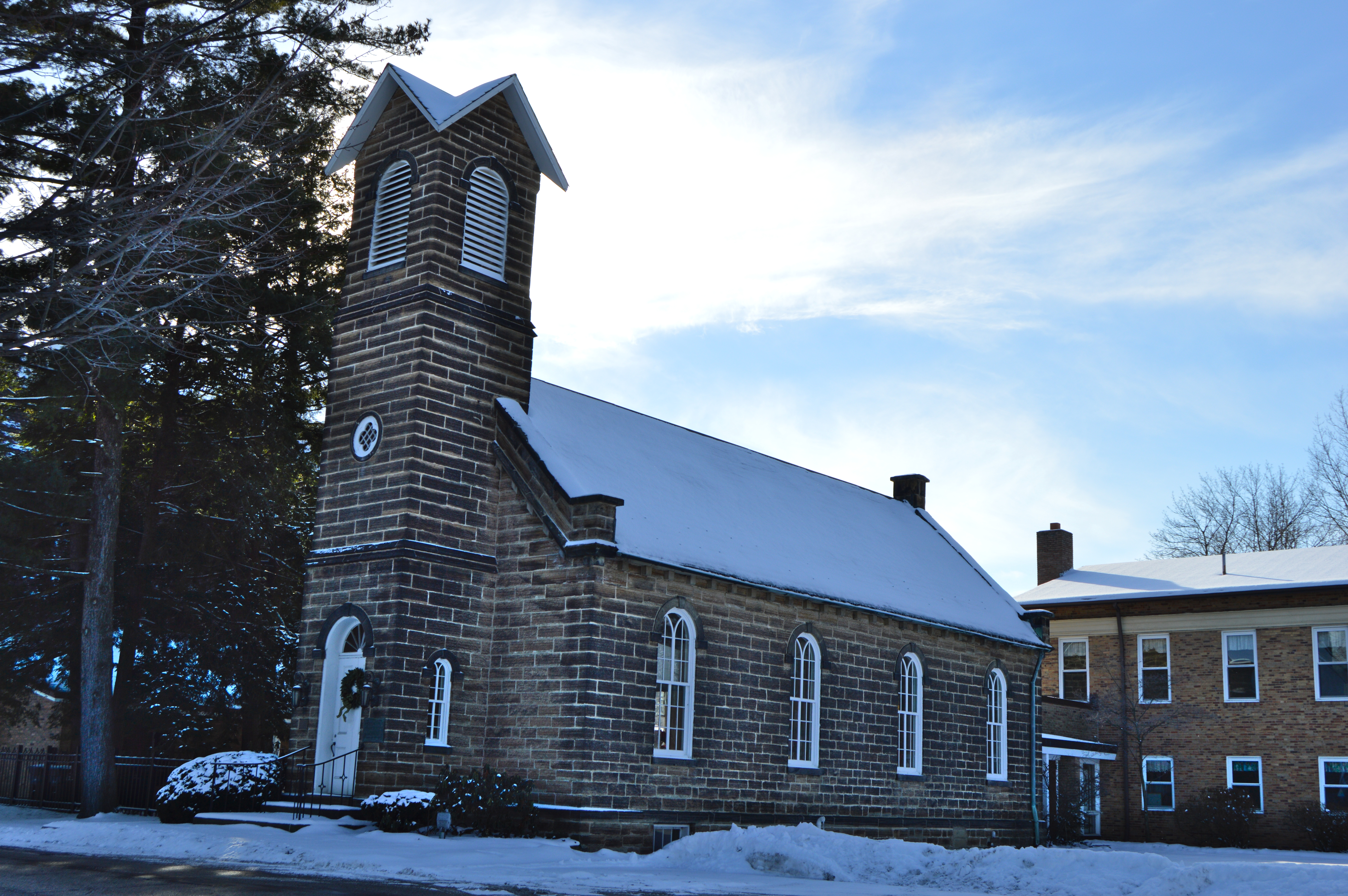
- The Independence Slab is embedded in the rear exterior wall of the church

- Location within Ohio Location within the United States
- Location: State Route 21, Independence, Ohio
- Coordinates: 41°22′55.5″N 81°38′30″W
- NRHP reference No.: 77001053

The Independence Slab originally was a series of petroglyphs carved in an outcropping of native silicious Berea sandstone located in the city of Independence, Cuyahoga County, Ohio. It was discovered by area quarry workers in the mid-1800s who were quarrying building materials for a nearby church. The quarrymen are thought to have likely damaged large portions of the petroglyphs before realizing what they uncovered. A portion of the slab measuring 4 by 7 feet (1.2 by 2.1 m) was hand quarried and placed in the rear exterior wall of the Independence Presbyterian Church, sometime during 1854, where it has remained to this day. The surviving portions of the slab are thought to depict images of animal footprints, such as elk, and a crayfish. and the petroglyphs are believed to be part of the Whittlesey period (1000-1650 AD). The Independence Slab is unusual, not only for the unorthodox way it was found and preserved, but also because petroglyphs themselves are rarely found in the Northeast Ohio area. Most Ohio petroglyphs have been found exposed to the elements, but the Independence Slab was noted to have been buried under a layer of soil prior to its discovery.

Today, the Independence Slab is still embedded in the walls of the Independence Presbyterian Church which is located near the Independence Public Square on Brecksville Road. The church was nominated to the National Register of Historic Places in the 1970s and mentioned the existence of the petroglyphs in its nomination documentation.
