= Rodney M. Guthrie =

American judge (1908–1991)

Justice of Wyoming Supreme Court
- In office 1972–1978
- Appointed by: Stanley K. Hathaway

Personal details
- Born: June 16, 1908 Crook County, Wyoming, U.S.
- Died: June 8, 1991 (aged 82) Cheyenne, Wyoming, U.S.

Rodney M. Guthrie (June 16, 1908 – June 8, 1991) was an American jurist who served as a justice of the Wyoming Supreme Court from January 1, 1972, to December 31, 1978.

Guthrie was born on a ranch near Moorcroft, Wyoming, in Crook County, Wyoming on June 16, 1908. He was the son of S.A. and Isabel M. Guthrie, who came to Wyoming in the 1880s and 1890s to ranch. Guthrie attended public schools in Moorcroft until he graduated from high school in May 1926. After graduating from the University of Wyoming with a law degree in 1931, he began the practice of law in Sundance, Wyoming (Crook County). From 1932 to 1936, he served as county and prosecuting attorney for Crook County. He moved to Newcastle, Wyoming in 1937. While there, he served as city attorney from 1939 to 1953. He continued the private practice of law in Newcastle until August 5, 1958, when he was appointed a district court judge. He served as a district court judge until December 31, 1971, when he resigned to accept the appointment by Governor Stanley K. Hathaway to the Wyoming Supreme Court. He retired from the Court on December 31, 1978. He died in Cheyenne, Wyoming, on June 8, 1991.

Judge Guthrie participated in the management of the family's ranching operation in Crook and Campbell Counties from the time of his graduation from law school in 1931 until his mother's death in 1941. He later continued as a partner in the ranching operation with his sister Isabel (Bert) Waddell until 1946, when the ranch was sold.

Legal offices
Preceded by Norman B. Gray	Justice of the Wyoming Supreme Court; 1972–1978	Succeeded by John J. Rooney
Preceded by Preston T. McAvoy	Wyoming State District Judge, Sixth Judicial District; 1958–1971	Succeeded by Paul T. Liamos Jr.
