= Ryan Schelhaas =

Interim Attorney General of Wyoming

Attorney General of Wyoming
- Acting
- In office May 28, 2025 – July 7, 2025
- Governor: Mark Gordon
- Preceded by: Bridget Hill
- Succeeded by: Keith G. Kautz

Personal details
- Party: Republican
- Education: University of Wyoming (BA, JD)

Ryan Schelhaas is the Interim Attorney General of Wyoming and will remain in the position of Interim Attorney General until the Wyoming Legislature opens for its 2026 Budget Session where the legislature can either pick him or another candidate to be the state's Attorney General. He was appointed as Interim Attorney General after Bridget Hill became a Justice of the Wyoming Supreme Court.

== Education ==
Schelhaas attended the University of Wyoming earning his bachelor's degree and Juris Doctor.

Legal offices
Preceded by Bridget Hill	Attorney General of Wyoming; Acting; 2025	Succeeded by Keith G. Kautz
