= Gay Woodhouse =

American politician and lawyer

32nd Attorney General of Wyoming
- In office November 1998 – June 2001
- Governor: Jim Geringer
- Preceded by: William U. Hill
- Succeeded by: Hoke MacMillan

Personal details
- Born: January 8, 1950 (age 76) Torrington, Wyoming
- Party: Republican
- Education: University of Wyoming (BA, JD)

Gay Woodhouse (born January 8, 1950) is an American politician and lawyer who was the 32nd Attorney General of Wyoming and the first female to hold the office. She replaced William U. Hill when he was named to the Supreme Court. She served from November 1998 until June 2001 when she retired to begin a private practice. Woodhouse had served as Laramie County Commission Chairwoman but chose not to run for a second four year term.

== Biography ==
Woodhouse was born January 8, 1950, in Torrington, Wyoming. She graduated from Huntley High School, earned an undergraduate degree from the University of Wyoming in 1972 and graduated from the University of Wyoming College of Law in 1977. Before becoming Attorney General, she served as an assistant attorney general, an assistant U.S. attorney and a chief deputy attorney general.

In 2020, a case against her for malpractice was heard in the Wyoming Supreme Court. Thomas Scranton had hired Woodhouse’s firm to represent him in a wrongful termination lawsuit against the City of Cheyenne. He claimed he “was denied a hearing to contest his termination because the attorney failed timely to request the hearing on behalf of Plaintiff.” The Supreme Court affirmed the district court’s decision in favor of Woodhouse.

She became a racing cyclist in 2012, and has won medals at the World Senior Games.
