= Michael Golden (judge) =

American judge

Chief Justice of Wyoming
- In office 1994–1996
- Preceded by: Richard J. Macy
- Succeeded by: William A. Taylor

Justice of the Wyoming Supreme Court
- In office June 30, 1988 – August 30, 2012
- Preceded by: Charles Stuart Brown
- Succeeded by: Michael K. Davis

Personal details
- Born: 1942 (age 83–84) Enid, Oklahoma, U.S.
- Education: University of Wyoming

Thomas Michael Golden (born 1942) is an American jurist who was a justice of the Wyoming Supreme Court.

== Biography ==
Golden was born on September 30, 1942, in Enid, Oklahoma. In high school, he played baseball with Dick Cheney in Casper, Wyoming. He received a B.A. in 1964 and a J.D. in 1967, both from the University of Wyoming. In 1992, he received an LLM from the University of Virginia Law School.

He served in the Judge Advocate General's Corps for four years. In 1988, he was appointed as a Justice in the Wyoming Supreme Court. From 1994 to 1996, he served as its chief justice. In June 2011, he authored a decision to grant divorces to same-sex married couples, despite the illegality of same-sex marriage in Wyoming at the time. Golden retired from the Wyoming Supreme Court in August 2012.
