= Charlotte Brown =

Charlotte Brown may refer to:

- Charlotte Hawkins Brown (1883–1961), American educator and academic
- Charlotte Brown (producer) (born 1943), American television writer, producer and director
- Charlotte Blake Brown (1846–1904), American doctor
- Charlotte L. Brown (1839–?), American civil rights activist
- Charlotte Emerson Brown (1838–1895), first president of the General Federation of Women's Clubs

== See also ==
- Charles Brown (disambiguation)
- Charlie Brown's (disambiguation)
