= William A. Taylor =

American judge (1928–2010)

William "Al" Taylor

Justice of the Wyoming Supreme Court
- In office 1993–1998
- Appointed by: Mike Sullivan

Personal details
- Born: November 2, 1928 Lusk, Wyoming
- Died: June 18, 2010 (aged 81) Green Valley, Arizona

William Alfred "Al" Taylor (November 2, 1928 – June 18, 2010) was an American jurist who served as a justice of the Wyoming Supreme Court from January 22, 1993, until his retirement in 1998.

On November 2, 1928, Taylor was born in Lusk, Wyoming to Don and Ethel Taylor. He graduated from Lusk High School in 1946. After receiving his teaching degree from the University of Wyoming in 1951, he taught geography, social studies, and arithmetic in Lusk, Wyoming. He joined the United States Army during the Korean War. After his military service and teaching two more years in Lusk, he attended law school at the University of Wyoming, obtaining his law degree in 1959. During law school, he married Jane Y. Lyons. After law school, he practiced law in Lusk, where he also served as city attorney and county attorney for Niobrara County. In 1976, he became the first Director of the Wyoming State Bar. He served as Director until 1980, when he was appointed by Governor Edgar J. Herschler to a new Wyoming state district court judgeship in the Eighth Judicial District, serving Converse, Platte, Goshen, and Niobrara Counties. He served as a state district judge until 1993, when he was appointed to the Wyoming Supreme Court by Governor Mike Sullivan. He served as chief justice from 1997 to 1998. He retired from the Wyoming Supreme Court in 1998. Taylor died June 18, 2010, in Green Valley, Arizona, and is buried in Lusk.

Taylor had three daughters. His middle daughter, Kari Jo Gray, was appointed to the Wyoming Supreme Court by Governor Matt Mead in September 2018; she was sworn in on October 9, 2018. Her robing ceremony took place on November 2, 2018, which would have been her father's 90th birthday.

Legal offices
Preceded by Walter Urbigkit	Justice of the Wyoming Supreme Court; 1993-1998	Succeeded by Barton R. Voigt
Preceded by New Judgeship	Wyoming State District Judge, Eighth Judicial District; 1980-1993	Succeeded by Barton R. Voigt
