= Boomgaarden =

Boomgaarden is a surname. Notable people with the surname include:

- Lynne J. Boomgaarden (born 1961), American judge
- Rike Boomgaarden, German singer and songwriter
