= Charles Browne =

Charles Browne may refer to:

- Charles Browne (politician) (1875–1947), American politician from New Jersey
- Charles Albert Browne Jr. (1870–1947), American sugar chemist
- Charles E. Browne (1816–1895), American pioneer and territorial legislator
- Charles Farrar Browne (1834–1867), American humor writer
- Charles P. Browne (1840–1916), New Zealand photographer

== See also ==
- Charles Brown (disambiguation)
