= Patrick Crank =

American lawyer

33rd Attorney General of Wyoming
- In office 2002–2007
- Governor: Dave Freudenthal
- Preceded by: Hoke MacMillan
- Succeeded by: Bruce Salzburg

Personal details
- Born: December 30, 1959 (age 66)
- Party: Democratic

Patrick J. Crank (born December 30, 1959) is an American politician and lawyer who was the 33rd Wyoming Attorney General, from 2002 until 2007. He currently serves as the Wyoming Game & Fish Commissioner for District #1 and is a shareholder of Speight, McCue & Crank, PC. Prior to his appointment, he worked in the United States Attorney's Office for the District of Wyoming.

His successor in the office of Attorney General was Bruce Salzburg.

== Education ==
- J.D., University of Wyoming Law School, 1985
- Bachelor's degree, Accounting University of Wyoming, 1982

== Professional experience ==
- Assistant United States Attorney, District of Wyoming, United States Attorney's Office, 1990–2002
- Natrona Country District Attorney's Office, 1987–1990
- Assistant Attorney General, Wyoming Attorney General's Office, 1985–1986

== Personal ==
Patrick J. Crank was born on December 30, 1959, in Pueblo, Colorado. He is married to Anna Crank. They have four children: Abbigail, Jerry, Zachary, Noah.

On September 18, 2004, Crank pleaded guilty as an accessory to the taking of the wrong sex of a moose in Lincoln County while hunting with his son. As a result of the hunting violation, he was issued to pay a $210 fine. The citation was issued to Crank rather than his son because as stated by Crank, “I know my son would not have shot at the moose unless I told him to do so”. In regards to this action Crank stated, “Life is frequently a humbling experience.”

In 2005, Patrick Crank reported his 16-year-old son Zachary Crank to the Laramie County Police Department for allegedly possessing marijuana inside of the family's home in Cheyenne, Wyoming. Zachary Crank was tried as an adult and pleaded guilty to possession of marijuana. He was ordered to perform community service, pay court costs, and submit to random drug testing. By complying with these conditions, Zachary Crank would later be granted expungement.

On Friday December 9, 2016 at 5:47pm, Patrick Crank was heading north on U.S. Highway 85 towards Torrington, Wyoming when he rear-ended a 1994 Ford F-250 driven by an unidentified 17-year-old. The 17-year-old was allegedly not injured and although Crank suffered non-life-threatening injuries, he was later airlifted to Denver where he was hospitalized and treated for his injuries.

Preceded by Hoke MacMillan	Wyoming Attorney General; 2002 - 2007	Succeeded by Bruce Salzburg
