= Archie G. McClintock =

American judge (1911–2004)

Archie Glenn McClintock (March 26, 1911 – December 7, 2004) was a justice of the Wyoming Supreme Court, and Wyoming Attorney General.

Born in Sheridan, Wyoming, McClintock received his J.D. from the University of Wyoming and practiced law in Cheyenne, Wyoming from 1935 to 1973. He was appointed to the Wyoming Supreme Court by Governor Stanley K. Hathaway on July 2, 1973, serving until his retirement on March 26, 1981. He was Wyoming Attorney General from 1982 to 1987.

McClintock died in Cheyenne.
