= Ohio Distance and Electronic Learning Academy =

American free, online charter school

The Ohio Distance and Electronic Learning Academy (OHDELA) is a tuition-free online public charter school for grades K-12.

The school is headquartered in Independence, Ohio, United States.

OHDELA uses different types of curricula such as Calvert and ThinkCentral. OHDELA gives parents the choice of which to use.

OHDELA is operated by Accel Management, a charter school management company.

As an online school, OHDELA has been treated differently by the State of Ohio in regards to educational accountability. Despite receiving an F on the State Report Card several years running, the school has continually received increased public funding. Due to this lack of accountability, the school has thrived financially in recent years, but student success has not necessarily followed.

OHDELA receives funding from the State of Ohio's taxpayers in excess of $10 million annually. This money is then able to be used by the school for whatever it deems necessary. The fact of public funding coupled with the lack of accountability has led to widespread criticism in the press both locally and nationally.

For several years, White Hat Management and OHDELA have been embroiled in a lawsuit over their funding and how it is allowed to be used. In a recent dissenting opinion, Ohio Supreme Court Justice O'Neill wrote "This contract does indeed permit a [charter school] operator ... to squander public money and then ... reap a bonus, paid for by public money. And that is why this contract is unenforceable as a matter of public policy and contract law." Furthermore, White Hat Management is facing other lawsuits from school districts across the State for its negligence in public education.

Despite OHDELA's slew of legal troubles and public ire, they are still operating in Ohio with taxpayer dollars.
