= Robert Jarosh =

American judge (born 1971)

Justice of the Wyoming Supreme Court
- Incumbent
- Assumed office March 27, 2024
- Appointed by: Mark Gordon
- Preceded by: Keith G. Kautz

Personal details
- Born: Robert Carl Jarosh; January 13, 1971 (age 54)
- Education: University of Wyoming (BS, MA, JD)

Robert Carl Jarosh (born January 13, 1971) is an American lawyer who has served as a justice of the Wyoming Supreme Court since 2024.

== Education ==
Jarosh is a graduate of Cheyenne Central High School. He earned a Bachelor of Science, with honors, in 1993 and a Master of Arts in political science in 1995, both from the University of Wyoming as well as a Juris Doctor from the University of Wyoming College of Law in 2001, graduating Order of the Coif.

== Career ==
After graduating law school, Jarosh served as a law clerk to Magistrate Judge William Beamon from 2001 to 2002. He was an associate with Hogan & Hartson, LLP from 2002 to 2003. He served for 13 years as a hearing officer for the city of Cheyenne for a variety of commissions and boards. From 2003 to 2024, he was a partner with Hirst Applegate, LLP. Jarosh served as president of the Wyoming State Bar from 2017 to 2018.

=== Appointment to Wyoming Supreme Court ===
In December 2023, Jarosh was one of three names submitted to the governor for nomination to the supreme court. On January 19, 2024, Governor Mark Gordon announced the appointment of Jarosh to the Wyoming Supreme Court. He filled the vacancy left by Justice Keith G. Kautz, who reached mandatory retirement age on March 26, 2024. The appointment was effective March 27, 2024.

== Personal life ==
Jarosh and his wife have two children.

Legal offices
Preceded by Keith G. Kautz	Justice of the Wyoming Supreme Court; 2024–present	Incumbent
