= Norman B. Gray =

American judge (1902–1976)

Norman Briggs Gray

Justice of Wyoming Supreme Court
- In office 1963–1971
- Preceded by: Fred H. Blume
- Succeeded by: Rodney M. Guthrie

19th Attorney General of Wyoming
- In office 1959–1962
- Governor: Joe Hickey; Jack R. Gage
- Preceded by: Thomas Miller
- Succeeded by: John F. Raper

14th Attorney General of Wyoming
- In office 1947–1951
- Governor: Lester C. Hunt
- Preceded by: Louis J. O'Marr
- Succeeded by: Harry S. Harnsberger

Personal details
- Born: October 24, 1902
- Died: June 22, 1976 (aged 73)

Norman Briggs "Tiny" Gray (October 24, 1902 – June 22, 1976) was an American jurist who served as a justice of the Wyoming Supreme Court from January 7, 1963, to December 31, 1971.

He was born in Bloomfield, Nebraska, and received a law degree from the University of Nebraska in 1928. He entered private practice in Norfolk, Nebraska, but moved to Cheyenne, Wyoming the following year, where he practiced law for many years.

He was secretary of the Wyoming Public Service Commission from 1932 to 1938 and then a trial examiner for the Federal Power Commission in Washington D.C.from 1938 to 1942. Upon return home he served as Wyoming Attorney General from 1947 to 1950 and again from 1959 to 1962. He practiced law from 1954 to 1959 with, among others, John J. Hickey. He became a Supreme Court justice on January 7, 1963, and retired on December 31, 1971. He died in Cheyenne on June 22, 1976.

Political offices
Preceded by Fred H. Blume	Justice of the Wyoming Supreme Court; 1963–1971	Succeeded by Rodney M. Guthrie
