= Peter K. Michael =

American politician and attorney

Peter Michael

37th Attorney General of Wyoming
- In office September 6, 2013 – March 15, 2019; Acting: July 9, 2013 – September 6, 2013
- Governor: Matt Mead; Mark Gordon
- Preceded by: Gregory Phillips
- Succeeded by: Bridget Hill

Personal details
- Born: Media, Pennsylvania, U.S.
- Political party: Republican
- Spouse: Lucinda Schmid
- Education: Yale University (BA); University of Wyoming (JD)

Peter K. Michael is an American attorney. He served as Attorney General of Wyoming from 2013 to 2019. The former Attorney General Gregory A. Phillips appointed him Chief Deputy Attorney General on May 1, 2011. Michael took over as acting-Attorney General on July 9, 2013, and succeeded him officially on September 6, 2013. His term of office is 4 years.

Legal offices
Preceded by Gregory Phillips	Attorney General of Wyoming; 2013–2019	Succeeded by Bridget Hill
