= Wyoming Chancery Court =

Business court of US state

The Chancery Court of the State of Wyoming (the Wyoming Chancery Court) was created in 2019 as a specialized business court to provide a streamlined judicial forum for addressing commercial, business, and trust cases litigated in Wyoming's state courts, with a unique focus on digital assets and blockchain technology.

== History ==
Wyoming's legislature passed a statute in 2019 creating the Wyoming Chancery Court, which was signed into law the same year. Unlike a traditional chancery court, which is a court of equity, Wyoming's new Chancery Court was given jurisdiction over purely monetary disputes (with more than $50,000 at issue) as well as actions in equity, with a limited subject matter jurisdiction focusing on disputes of a business and commercial nature. One early stated goal for the Chancery court involves Wyoming seeing itself in a unique role involving cryptocurrency and blockchain technology: "Coupled with Wyoming’s innovative legal framework for digital assets and blockchain technologies, the Chancery court should attract blockchain businesses and cryptocurrency companies to the state".

The court went live on December 1, 2021.

== Court practices and personnel ==
The court has its own set of rules. Under Wyoming Rules of Civil Procedure for the Chancery Court, all parties to a case must consent to the Chancery Court's jurisdiction, so a single party may timely object to that jurisdiction and have the case dismissed from the Chancery Court. The Chancery Court does not have jury trials, and is to employ alternative dispute resolution (including early mediation), limited motion practice, and carefully monitored and tailored discovery in making sure cases are handled expeditiously and effectively. The court publishes its written legal decisions. It is the first state trial court in Wyoming to use electronic filing.

The court can have up to three judges. The Chancery Court judges have concurrent statewide jurisdiction with Wyoming's District Court (the trial court of general jurisdiction) judges over matters within the Chancery Court's jurisdiction. Chancery Court judges receive the same salaries as District Court judges, and will be similarly chosen on a merit-based system, though they must be knowledgeable in commercial law. There is a separate clerk for the Chancery Court. There is a Chancery Court Division of the Permanent Rules Advisory Committee that meets periodically to study the Chancery Court's progress and to determine whether refinements in Chancery Court practices and rules would be beneficial.

From its inception in December 2021 to January 1, 2025 two already sitting Wyoming District Court judges served on the Chancery Court; judges Steven K. Sharpe and Richard L. Lavery. In late 2024, Benjamin Burningham was appointed as the first Wyoming Chancery Court judge, effective January 1, 2025. Before Burningham's appointment as a judge, he was the Wyoming Judicial Branch’s chief legal officer and director. In 2025, Sharpe and Lavery received the Larry L. Lehman Awards for Judicial Excellence from the Wyoming State Bar for their "leadership and service to the Judicial Branch and Bar in helping to successfully stand up the Wyoming Chancery Court", while still handle their full dockets as District Court judges.

During its first three years of operation, the Chancery Court went from 15 cases filed in its first year to 47 new cases filed in its third year (2024); with an average resolution time of 148 days from the case's inception and 56 days from the initial case management conference. From February 28, 2022 to May 1, 2026, the Chancery Court issued 50 Orders and Decisions that were published on the court's website.
