= Joe Kovacs (puppeteer) =

American puppeteer and actor (born 1967)

- Kovacs, with Madame, 2007
- Born: Joseph Stephen Kovacs; December 15, 1967 (age 57); Independence, Ohio, U.S.
- Occupation(s): Puppeteer, actor

Joe Kovacs (Born Joseph Stephen Kovacs; December 15, 1967) is an American puppeteer and actor.

Kovacs was born in Independence, Ohio. In 2006 and 2007, Kovacs handled the puppet Madame, including a performance on VH1's I Love the '70s.
