= Johanna Bond =

American law professor and academic administrator

Academic background
- Education: Colorado College (BA); University of Minnesota (JD, MPP); Georgetown University (LLM)

Academic work
- Discipline: Human rights law
- Institutions: University of Wyoming; Washington and Lee University; Rutgers Law School

Johanna Bond is an American law professor and academic administrator specializing in international human rights law and gender issues. She has served as the dean of Rutgers Law School since 2023.

== Education ==
Bond earned a B.A. from Colorado College. She completed a master's degree in public policy and a J.D. from the University of Minnesota. Bond clerked for U.S. district judge Ann D. Montgomery. She earned an LL.M. from the Georgetown University Law Center.

== Career ==
Bond's legal academic career began with a focus on international human rights law and gender issues. She served as an Associate Professor of Law at the University of Wyoming College of Law and as a visiting associate professor and executive director of the women's law and public policy fellowship program at Georgetown University Law Center. Bond’s academic research and publications are primarily centered around gender equality, international human rights law, and intersectionality. She was awarded a Fulbright Scholarship twice, first in 2001 and again in 2015. The 2001 Fulbright enabled her to conduct research in Uganda and Tanzania, which contributed to her edited book, Voices of African Women: Women’s Rights in Ghana, Uganda, and Tanzania (Carolina Academic Press, 2005). This work emphasized women's legal rights in different African countries and was part of her ongoing research into gender and the law on a global scale.

In 2008, Bond joined the faculty at Washington and Lee University School of Law (W&L Law), where she continued her research and teaching in international human rights and gender law. She published numerous articles and two significant books, including Global Intersectionality and Contemporary Human Rights (Oxford University Press, 2021), which explored the intersection of various human rights issues on a global scale. Her contributions to legal scholarship were recognized with several awards, including an endowed chair at W&L in 2017, the Lewis Prize for Excellence in Legal Scholarship in 2021, and the Ethan Allen Faculty Award for Scholarship in the same year. In addition to her research, Bond held leadership positions at W&L, serving as Associate Dean for Academic Affairs and participating in multiple university-wide committees, including the Presidential Search Committee, the Provost Search Committee, and the Law Dean Search Committee. She also served as the Chair of the Strategic Planning Steering Committee’s Sub-committee on Diversity, Equity, and Inclusion.

On July 3, 2023, Bond became dean of Rutgers Law School. In this role, she became the first dean to oversee both the Camden and Newark campuses, following the 2015 merger of Rutgers’ law schools. As dean, Bond leads the largest public law school in the United States.

In March, 2026, Bond was sued for terminating the Director of the Minority Students Program.

Bond has been named in three discrimination lawsuits since becoming Dean in 2023. She is defending her position and the position of Rutgers Law School and its employees. These lawsuits have not been ruled on or settled.
