= Independence Presbyterian Church =

Historic church in Ohio, United States

- U.S. National Register of Historic Places
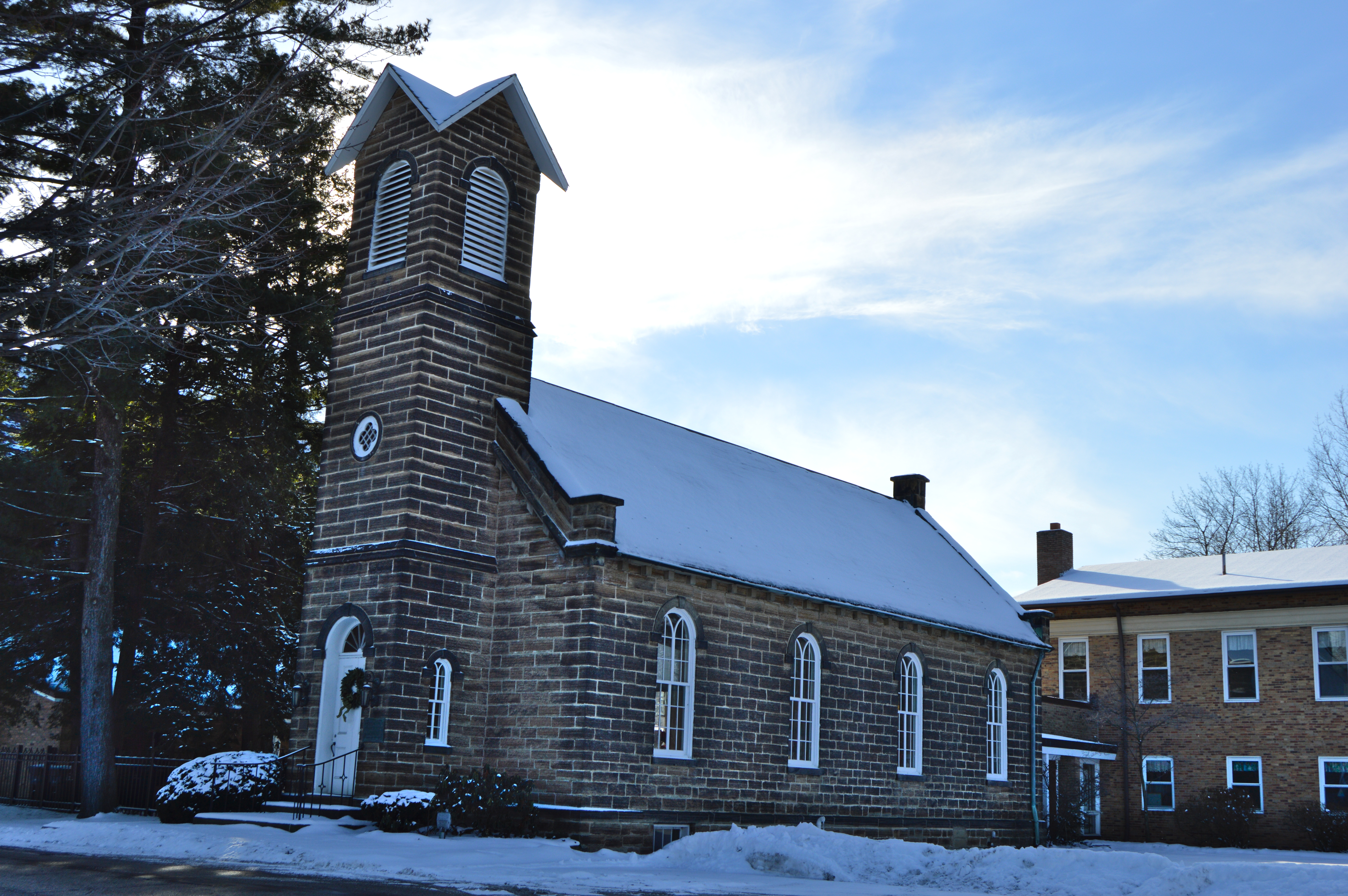
- Northern side and front

- Location within Ohio Location within the United States
- Location: State Route 21, Independence, Ohio
- Coordinates: 41°22′55.5″N 81°38′30″W
- Area: Less than 1 acre (0.40 ha)
- Built: 1853
- Architect: Jacob Merkle
- NRHP reference No.: 77001053
- Added to NRHP: April 13, 1977

Independence Presbyterian Church is a historic church in the city of Independence, Ohio, United States. Constructed in the 1850s, the stone church building was originally home to a congregation heavily dependent on the local mining economy, but since the 1920s it has again been associated with an active congregation. It was named a historic site in the 1970s.

Independence Presbyterian is largely a stone building; both the foundation and the walls are stone, and the roof is slate. The structure is that of a gabled rectangle with a square tower at the front, in which is placed the main entrance. The top of the tower includes a belfry with louvering. The overall design is simple with comparatively little ornamentation, although a significant counterexample is the building's back wall, in which was placed a prominent petroglyph known as the Independence Slab.

Local Presbyterians were organized into a congregation in 1837, but nearly two decades passed before the building was built; it was constructed in 1855 according to a design produced by Jacob Merkle. The local economy at the time was heavily dependent on nearby stone quarries, and the congregation was no different: when the quarries closed in 1905, the congregation was also disorganized. After twenty years of vacancy, the building became home to another Presbyterian congregation in 1925. Growth forced the building's replacement in the 1960s, and a new structure was finished on an adjacent property in 1963. Since that time, the old building has generally been used only for special events. The congregation remains an active part of the Western Reserve Presbytery of the Presbyterian Church (USA).

In 1977, the old church was listed on the National Register of Historic Places, qualifying because of its historically significant architecture. It is one of five National Register-listed locations in Independence, along with the Fuller-Bramley House, the Packard-Doubler House, the South Park Site, and the William Tricker Inc. Historic District.
