= Chuck Brown (disambiguation) =

Chuck Brown (1936–2012) was an American musician and singer.

Chuck Brown may also refer to:

- Chuck Brown (American football) (born 1957), American football player
- Chuck Brown (comics artist), American comics writer
- Chuck Brown (politician) (1951–2003), American politician
- Chucky Brown (born 1968), American basketball player

== See also ==
- Charles Brown (disambiguation)
