= Michael K. Davis =

American judge

Michael Davis

Chief Justice of the Wyoming Supreme Court
- In office July 1, 2018 – June 30, 2021
- Preceded by: E. James Burke
- Succeeded by: Kate M. Fox

Justice of the Wyoming Supreme Court
- In office August 30, 2012 – January 16, 2022
- Appointed by: Matt Mead
- Preceded by: Michael Golden
- Succeeded by: John G. Fenn

Personal details
- Born: January 16, 1952 (age 73); Kansas, U.S.
- Education: Western State Colorado University (BA); University of Wyoming (JD)

Michael K. Davis (born January 16, 1952) is a former justice of the Wyoming Supreme Court; he served on the court from 2012 to 2022.

He received a Bachelor of Arts summa cum laude from Western State College of Colorado in 1977, and a Juris Doctor with Honor from the University of Wyoming College of Law in 1980.

He practiced law with the firm of Yonkee and Toner in Sheridan from 1980 to 2006, and from a Cheyenne branch office of the firm from 2006 until 2008, when he became a district judge. He is a Judicial Fellow of the American College of Trial Lawyers.

Davis retired on January 16, 2022.

Legal offices
Preceded by Michael Golden	Associate Justice of the Wyoming Supreme Court; 2012–2022	Succeeded by John G. Fenn
Preceded by E. James Burke	Chief Justice of the Wyoming Supreme Court; 2018–2021	Succeeded by Kate M. Fox
