= Louis J. O'Marr =

American politician

Associate member of the Indian Claims Commission
- In office April 9, 1947 – August 1, 1959
- Succeeded by: Arthur Vivian Watkins

13th Attorney General of Wyoming
- In office January 22, 1943 – 1951
- Preceded by: Ewing Thomas Kerr
- Succeeded by: Norman B. Gray

Chairman of the Wyoming Highway Commission
- In office March 21, 1933 – February 28, 1939

Personal details
- Born: 1882 Independence, Ohio, U.S.
- Died: June 27, 1966 (aged 83–84) Sheridan, Wyoming, U.S.
- Party: Democratic
- Spouse: Georgia
- Children: 1
- Education: University of Minnesota

Louis J. O'Marr (1882 – June 27, 1966) was an American politician who served as the 13th attorney general of Wyoming. Prior to his tenure as attorney general he served as chairman of the Wyoming Highway Commission and following his tenure he was appointed to the Indian Claims Commission by President Harry S. Truman.

== Early life ==
Louis J. O'Marr was born in Independence, Ohio, in 1882, to Sarah M. Fuch and James J. O'Marr, who later served as mayor of Sheridan, Wyoming. In 1904, he graduated from the University of Minnesota and moved to Sheridan, Wyoming, in 1906. He was admitted to the Wyoming State Bar in 1910. He served as the city attorney of Sheridan for two terms and on the Wyoming Board of Law Examiners for twenty years.

== Career ==
O'Marr was appointed to the Wyoming Highway Commission by Governor Leslie A. Miller, was selected to serve as chairman of the commission on March 21, 1933, and served until his term expired on February 28, 1939.

On November 30, 1942, Governor-elect Lester C. Hunt announced that he would appoint O'Marr as Attorney General of Wyoming, Hunt appointed him on January 4, 1943, as his first act as governor, and O'Marr was approved by unanimity by the Wyoming Senate on January 22.

O'Marr planned to reopen his law office in Sheridan after leaving the attorney general office in 1947. On March 12, 1947, President Harry S. Truman appointed O'Marr as an associate member of the Indian Claims Commission, which was confirmed by the Senate on April 9. On August 1, 1959, he resigned from the Indian Claims Commission and President Dwight D. Eisenhower selected former Senator Arthur Vivian Watkins to replace O'Marr.

== Death ==
On June 27, 1966, O'Marr died in Sheridan, Wyoming.
