= Bruce Salzburg =

American lawyer

Bruce A. Salzburg (born July 11, 1947) was the 34th Wyoming Attorney General. He was appointed by the Governor of Wyoming in August 2007. His predecessor was Patrick J. Crank. He was succeeded by Greg Phillips in 2011.

Preceded by Patrick J. Crank	Wyoming Attorney General; August 2007 – January 2011	Succeeded by Greg Phillips
