= Carlos Brown =

Carlos Brown may refer to:

- Carlos Brown (American football) (born 1988), Michigan Wolverine running back
- Carlos Brown (footballer) (1882–1926), Argentine footballer
- Carlinhos Brown (born 1962), Brazilian musician
- Carlitos Brown, the Spanish name of Charlie Brown
- Alan Autry (born 1952), American actor, politician, and National Football League player

== See also ==
- Charles Brown (disambiguation)
