= Gregory A. Phillips =

American judge (born 1960)

Gregory Phillips
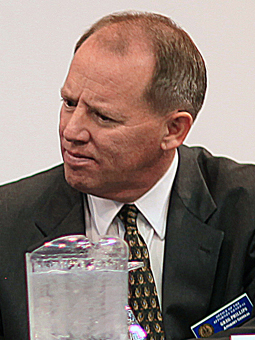

Judge of the United States Court of Appeals for the Tenth Circuit
- Incumbent
- Assumed office July 9, 2013
- Appointed by: Barack Obama
- Preceded by: Terrence L. O'Brien

36th Attorney General of Wyoming
- In office January 3, 2011 – July 9, 2013
- Governor: Matt Mead
- Preceded by: Bruce Salzburg
- Succeeded by: Peter K. Michael

Personal details
- Born: Gregory Alan Phillips; August 17, 1960 (age 65) Littleton, Colorado, U.S.
- Party: Democratic
- Education: University of Wyoming (BS, JD)

Gregory Alan Phillips (born August 17, 1960) is an American lawyer who serves as a United States circuit judge of the United States Court of Appeals for the Tenth Circuit and former Wyoming Attorney General.

== Biography ==
Phillips was born on August 17, 1960, in Littleton, Colorado and grew up in Evanston, Wyoming. He received his Bachelor of Science degree, in 1983, from the University of Wyoming. He received his Juris Doctor, cum laude, in 1987, from the University of Wyoming College of Law, graduating Order of the Coif. He served as a law clerk to Judge Alan Bond Johnson of the United States District Court for the District of Wyoming from 1987 to 1989. In 1989, Phillips joined his father and brother in their general law practice in Evanston, handling a broad range of civil matters, including construction law, bankruptcy law, Social Security Disability Insurance claims, employee benefits disputes, and white collar criminal defense. From 1993 to 1999, he also represented with 15th district of the Wyoming State Senate in Uinta County. Phillips opened the law firm of Mead & Phillips in 1998, handling civil litigation and prosecuting Medicaid reimbursement claims on behalf of Wyoming. In 2003, he joined the United States Attorney's Office for the United States District Court for the District of Wyoming, handling criminal prosecutions and appeals on behalf of the U.S. Government. In March 2011, he was appointed to serve as Attorney General of Wyoming by Governor Matt Mead, representing the state of Wyoming before state and federal courts, serving until July 9, 2013.

== Federal judicial service ==
On January 31, 2013, President Barack Obama nominated Phillips to serve as a United States Circuit Judge of the United States Court of Appeals for the Tenth Circuit to the seat vacated by Judge Terrence L. O'Brien, who assumed senior status on April 30, 2013. His nomination was reported by the Senate Judiciary Committee by a voice vote on April 18, 2013. His nomination was confirmed on July 8, 2013, by an 88–0 vote. He received his commission on July 9, 2013.

Legal offices
Preceded by Bruce Salzburg	Attorney General of Wyoming; 2011–2013	Succeeded by Peter K. Michael
Preceded by Terrence L. O'Brien	Judge of the United States Court of Appeals for the Tenth Circuit; 2013–present	Incumbent
