= George F. Guy =

American politician

Member of the Wyoming House of Representatives
- In office 1949–1949

17th Attorney General of Wyoming
- In office 1955–1957
- Governor: Milward Simpson
- Preceded by: Howard Black
- Succeeded by: Thomas Miller

Personal details
- Born: May 4, 1904
- Died: April 25, 1980 (aged 75)
- Party: Republican
- Education: University of Wyoming

George F. Guy (May 4, 1904 – April 25, 1980) was an American politician. He served as a Republican member of the Wyoming House of Representatives.
