= Benjamin F. Fowler =

Third Attorney General of Wyoming

Benjamin Franklin Fowler

Attorney General of Wyoming
- In office January 7, 1895 – January 3, 1898
- Governor: William A. Richards
- Preceded by: Charles N. Potter
- Succeeded by: Josiah Van Orsdel

Personal details
- Born: November 11, 1860; Hanover, Illinois, US
- Died: October 31, 1900 (aged 39); Cheyenne, Wyoming, US

Benjamin Franklin Fowler (November 11, 1860 – October 31, 1900) was the third Attorney General of Wyoming, serving from January 7, 1895, to January 3, 1898.

Fowler was born on November 11, 1860, in Hanover, Illinois. Fowler moved to Wyoming in 1884. He was appointed United States Attorney for the District of Wyoming by Benjamin Harrison, serving 1890 to 1894. Fowler served as Wyoming Attorney General from January 7, 1895, to January 3, 1898.

Fowler died on October 31, 1900, of appendicitis.
