= Frank Mendicino =

American attorney and politician

Member of the Wyoming House of Representatives
- In office 1973–1974

25th Attorney General of Wyoming
- In office 1975–1978
- Governor: Edgar Herschler
- Preceded by: David B. Kennedy
- Succeeded by: John J. Rooney (acting)

Personal details
- Party: Democratic
- Education: University of Wyoming (BA, JD)

Frank Mendicino is an American attorney and politician. He served as a Democratic member of the Wyoming House of Representatives.

== Life and career ==
Mendicino started college at the University of Colorado, but transferred to the University of Wyoming.

In 1973, Mendicino was elected to the Wyoming House of Representatives, representing Albany County, Wyoming, serving until 1974. In 1975, he served as attorney general of Wyoming, succeeding David B. Kennedy. He served until 1978, when he was succeeded by John J. Rooney.
