= Lynne J. Boomgaarden =

American judge (born 1961)

Lynne Boomgaarden

Chief Justice of the Wyoming Supreme Court
- Incumbent
- Assumed office May 28, 2025
- Preceded by: Kate M. Fox

Justice of the Wyoming Supreme Court
- Incumbent
- Assumed office February 20, 2018
- Appointed by: Matt Mead
- Preceded by: William U. Hill

Personal details
- Born: 1961 (age 64–65)
- Education: University of Wyoming (BS, JD)

Lynne J. Boomgaarden (born 1961) is an American lawyer who has served the chief justice of the Wyoming Supreme Court since 2025, while concurrently serving as a justice of the court since 2018.

== Education ==
Boomgaarden received her Bachelor of Science from the University of Wyoming in 1983 and her Juris Doctor with honor from the University of Wyoming College of Law in 1991.

== Career ==
After graduating law school she served as a clerk for Judge Wade Brorby of the United States Court of Appeals for the Tenth Circuit. She served in private practice with Crowley Fleck, PLLP, as director of the Office of State Lands and Investments, and as an assistant professor at the University of Wyoming College of Law.

=== Service on Wyoming Supreme Court ===
In December 2017 Governor Matt Mead appointed Boomgaarden to the Wyoming Supreme Court. Boomgaarden replaced Justice William U. Hill who retired on February 17, 2018. She was sworn into office on March 12, 2018. Boomgaarden is the third woman appointed the Wyoming Supreme Court. She began her term as chief justice on May 28, 2025 after Kate M. Fox retired.

Legal offices
Preceded by William U. Hill	Justice of the Wyoming Supreme Court; 2018–present	Incumbent
Preceded by Kate M. Fox	Chief Justice of the Wyoming Supreme Court; 2025–present	Incumbent
