= Ellen Crowley-Suyematsu =

Wyoming politician

Mary Ellen Crowley-Suyematsu

Member of the Wyoming House of Representatives from the Laramie district
- Succeeded by: Steve Freudenthal

Personal details
- Born: July 16, 1916
- Died: May 28, 2001 (aged 84)

Ellen Crowley-Suyematsu (July 16, 1916 – May 28, 2001) was an American Republican politician from Cheyenne, Wyoming. She represented the Laramie district in the Wyoming House of Representatives from 1973 to 1987.

In 1959, she became the first female Deputy Attorney General in Wyoming.

Crowley-Suyematsu was born in Cheyenne, Wyoming in 1916. She died there in 2001 at the age of 84.
