= William U. Hill =

American judge

William Hill

Chief Justice of Wyoming
- In office July 1, 2002 – June 30, 2006
- Preceded by: Larry Lehman
- Succeeded by: Barton R. Voigt

Justice of the Wyoming Supreme Court
- In office November 3, 1998 – February 16, 2018
- Appointed by: Jim Geringer
- Succeeded by: Lynne J. Boomgaarden

31st Attorney General of Wyoming
- In office March 1995 – November 3, 1998
- Governor: Jim Geringer
- Preceded by: Joseph Meyer
- Succeeded by: Gay Woodhouse

Personal details
- Born: February 16, 1948 (age 78) Montgomery, Alabama, U.S.
- Education: University of Wyoming

William U. Hill (born February 16, 1948) is a former justice of the Wyoming Supreme Court, serving on the high from 1998 to 2018.

Hill received his Bachelor of Arts from the University of Wyoming in 1970 and was graduated from University of Wyoming College of Law in 1974. Earlier in his career, he served as both an Assistant United States Attorney and an Assistant Attorney General for Wyoming, and was engaged in private practice in Riverton, Wyoming, Seattle, Washington, and Cheyenne, Wyoming. He also served as Chief of Staff-Chief Counsel for Senator Malcolm Wallop in Washington, D.C. Hill served as chief justice from July 1, 2002, through June 30, 2006. He previously served as the state's Attorney General. He retired on February 16, 2018, upon turning 70.
