= Thomas Miller (Wyoming politician) =

American attorney and politician

Member of the Wyoming Senate
- In office 1953–1955

18th Attorney General of Wyoming
- In office 1957–1959
- Governor: Milward Simpson
- Preceded by: George F. Guy
- Succeeded by: Norman B. Gray

Personal details
- Born: July 24, 1898 Lusk, Wyoming, U.S.
- Died: February 2, 1993 (aged 94)
- Party: Republican
- Spouse: Margaret C. Dorsey (m. 1922)
- Children: 3

Thomas Miller (July 24, 1898 – February 2, 1993) was an American attorney and politician. He served as a Republican member of the Wyoming Senate.

== Life and career ==
Miller was born in Lusk, Wyoming. He attended Lusk High School and served with the United States Army Corps of Engineers during World War I.

In 1953, Miller was elected to the Wyoming Senate, representing Niobrara County, Wyoming, serving until 1955. In 1957, he served as attorney general of Wyoming, succeeding George F. Guy. He served until 1959, when he was succeeded by Norman B. Gray.

Miller died in February 1993 at the Boswell Memorial Hospital, at the age of 94.
