= David B. Kennedy =

American attorney and politician

Member of the Wyoming House of Representatives
- In office 1967–1971

24th Attorney General of Wyoming
- In office 1974–1975
- Governor: Stanley K. Hathaway
- Preceded by: Clarence Addison Brimmer Jr.
- Succeeded by: Frank Mendicino

Personal details
- Born: September 2, 1933 Ann Arbor, Michigan, U.S.
- Died: March 10, 2019 (aged 85)
- Party: Republican
- Education: McGill University; University of Michigan; Indiana University; Yale University

David Boyd Kennedy (September 2, 1933 – March 10, 2019) was an American attorney and politician. He served as a Republican member of the Wyoming House of Representatives.

== Life and career ==
Kennedy was born in Ann Arbor, Michigan and graduated from Ann Arbor High School in 1951. He attended McGill University, Indiana University where he received an AB in Economics and minor in Russian in 1958, the University of Michigan where he received L.L.B. in 1963, and Yale University. He served in the United States Army from 1954 to 1957 and was stationed at Fort Devens, Massachusetts.

In 1967, Kennedy was elected to the Wyoming House of Representatives, representing Sheridan County, Wyoming, serving until 1971. In 1974, he served as attorney general of Wyoming, succeeding Clarence Addison Brimmer Jr. He served until 1975, when he was succeeded by Frank Mendicino.

Kennedy died in March 2019, at the age of 85.
