= Oscar A. Hall =

American politician (1923–2004)

Member of the Wyoming House of Representatives from the Carbon County district
- In office 1959–1961 Serving with Joe Cecchin, Jay House

Personal details
- Born: December 15, 1923 Rawlins, Wyoming, U.S.
- Died: June 4, 2004 (aged 80)
- Cause of death: Stroke
- Party: Democratic
- Spouse: Ileene Hall (m. 1948)
- Children: 6
- Parent(s): Alget Peter Hall; Anna Sjogren
- Education: University of Wyoming College of Law (JD)
- Profession: Politician, lawyer

Oscar A. Hall (December 15, 1923 – June 4, 2004) was an American politician and lawyer from Rawlins, Wyoming who served a single term in the Wyoming House of Representatives, representing Carbon County from 1959 to 1961 (Note: According to the Wyoming Legislature, Hall only served in 1959.) as a Democrat in the 35th Wyoming Legislature.

== Early life and education ==
Hall was born in Rawlins, Wyoming on December 15, 1923. His parents, Alget Peter Hall and Anna Sjogren, were immigrants from Sweden.

Hall graduated from high school as valedictorian in 1941. Hall moved to Laramie, Wyoming and graduated from the University of Wyoming College of Law with a Juris Doctor in June 1952.

== Career ==
Hall began a law practice in January 1955.

Hall served as city attorney of Rawlins under Mayor Sam Tully. He served out the remainder of County Attorney Dudley Miles's term, and was himself elected to three four-year terms as Carbon County Attorney.

In 1959, Hall was elected to a single term in the Wyoming House of Representatives. He represented Carbon County from 1959 to 1961 as a Democrat in the 35th Wyoming Legislature. Hall represented Carbon County alongside Democrats Joe Cecchin and Jay House.

Hall retired from practicing law in 1988.

== Personal life and death ==
Hall was a member of the Wyoming Bar Association and The Elks. He was also president of the Carbon County Historical Society.

On July 12, 1948, Hall eloped with Margaret Ileene Hennek, whom he married in the First Methodist Church of Reno in Reno, Nevada. The Halls had six children together.

Hall died of a stroke at the age of 80 on October 4, 2004.

== Notes ==
Wyoming House of Representatives
Preceded by —	Member of the Wyoming House of Representatives from the Carbon County district 1959–1961; Served alongside: Joe Cecchin, Jay House	Succeeded by —
