= Barton R. Voigt =

American judge

Barton Voigt

Chief Justice of Wyoming
- In office July 1, 2006 – July 1, 2010
- Preceded by: William U. Hill
- Succeeded by: Marilyn S. Kite

Justice of the Wyoming Supreme Court
- In office March 29, 2001 – January 3, 2014
- Appointed by: Dave Freudenthal

Personal details
- Born: 1949 (age 76–77)
- Spouse: Sandy Voigt
- Education: University of Wyoming
- Profession: Attorney, judge

Barton R. Voigt (born 1949) was Chief Justice of the Wyoming Supreme Court between the years 2006 and 2010.

Voigt moved to Thermopolis, Wyoming as a child and was raised there. He obtained a B.A. and M.A. in American History, as well as a J.D., at the University of Wyoming. He practiced law in Thermopolis for ten years, serving as Hot Springs County attorney for two terms. After two years as a county judge in Gillette, he spent the next eight years as a district judge in Douglas. He was appointed to the court on March 29, 2001, and became Chief Justice on July 1, 2006.

He retired from the Wyoming Supreme Court in January 2014.
