= Charlie Brown's =

Charlie Brown's may refer to:

- Charlie Brown's Fresh Grill, a franchise of dining restaurants based in New Jersey, US
- Charlie Brown's, Limehouse, a public house in East London
- Charlie Brown's Roundabout, a former public house and road junction in Woodford, outer London

== See also ==
- Charles Brown (disambiguation)
