= Charlie Brown (Scottish footballer) =

Scottish footballer (1924–2019)

Personal information
- Date of birth: 18 September 1924
- Place of birth: Dumfries, Scotland
- Date of death: 10 October 2019 (aged 95)
- Position: Centre-forward

Senior career*
Years	Team	Apps	(Gls)
- LMS Rovers
1948–1953	Queen of the South	49	(19)
- Tarff Rovers
- * Club domestic league appearances and goals

Charlie Brown (18 September 1924 – 10 October 2019) was a Scottish footballer who played for his home-town club, Queen of the South.

Brown signed for Queens in 1948 from LMS Rovers. Between then and his departure, Brown made 49 appearances and scored 19 goals. Brown did not establish himself as a first-team regular, playing in an era when he had to compete with Scotland internationalist Billy Houliston, followed by the club's all-time record goalscorer Jim Patterson, for the centre forward position.

Up until Brown's death on 10 October 2019, he had been the oldest known surviving former Queens' player since the death of Ivor Broadis on 12 April 2019.
