= Charlie Brown (footballer, born 1873) =

Australian rules footballer

Personal information
- Full name: Charles Herbert Brown
- Born: 28 August 1873; Melbourne
- Died: 23 October 1941 (aged 68)
- Original team: Ascot Vale

Playing career^{1}
Years	Club	Games (Goals)
1898	Carlton	12 (1)
- ^{1} Playing statistics correct to the end of 1898.

Charles Herbert Brown (28 August 1873 – 23 October 1941) was an Australian rules footballer who played with Carlton in the Victorian Football League (VFL).
