= Charles P. Browne =

New Zealand commercial photographer (1840–1916)

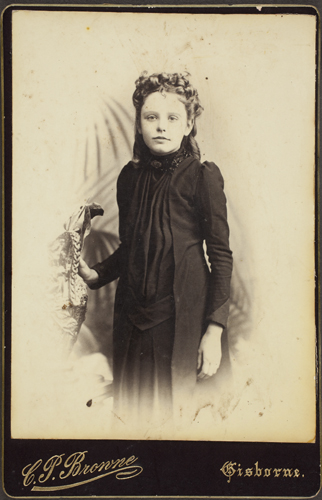
Unidentified Portrait taken by C P Browne

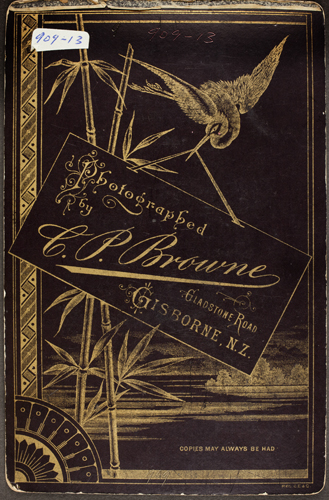
Reverse of Unidentified Portrait taken by C P Browne

Charles Pelham Browne (1840 – 25 May 1916) was a prominent photographer in the Gisborne, New Zealand district operating between the years of 1876 and 1901. Many examples of his work are held by the Tairawhiti Museum.

== Biography ==
C P Browne was born circa 1840 England, reg. Dec 1840 (as Charles Pelham Brown), baptised 4 June 1842 Mellor, Mellor, Derbyshire, England.

C P Browne established a photographic business in Gisborne in 1876 after spending some time in Thames and Auckland.

On 20 September 1878, Browne married Catherine Rebecca Morse. They had no children.

In 1895, Browne joined the Lodge Abercorn at Gisborne, and remained a member until his death on 25 May 1916.

== Working Life ==
Browne's work consisted mainly of studio portraiture. Oil colouring and photo-enamelling by Browne was highly regarded in commentaries from the local newspaper.

By 1883 Browne was advertising as 'Gisborne Photographic Studio'. In 1891 his studio in Gladstone Road, Gisborne was extended for greater capacity.

Catherine Browne was known to work with C P Browne on photographic expeditions and in the studio.

Browne sold his business to Benjamin Shatford Cox in 1901.
