= Kari Jo Gray =

American judge (born 1960)

Justice of the Wyoming Supreme Court
- Incumbent
- Assumed office October 9, 2018
- Appointed by: Matt Mead
- Preceded by: E. James Burke

Personal details
- Born: September 20, 1960 (age 64); Lusk, Wyoming, U.S.
- Political party: Republican
- Education: University of Arkansas (BS); University of Wyoming (JD)

Kari Jo Gray (born September 20, 1960) is an American lawyer and judge who serves as a justice of the Wyoming Supreme Court since 2018.

== Education ==
Gray has a Bachelor of Science in finance from the University of Arkansas and a Juris Doctor from the University of Wyoming College of Law.

== Career ==
Gray served in private practice at Gray & Associates in Douglas, Wyoming for twelve years before becoming Chief of Staff to the governor in 2011.

=== Wyoming Supreme Court service ===
Gray was one of three names submitted to the governor by the judicial nominating commission for appointment to the Supreme Court. On September 4, 2018 Governor Matt Mead announced his selection of Gray to fill the seat left vacant by the retirement of E. James Burke. Gray's ascension to the state's highest court marked the third female appointment for the governor and the first time the court had a female majority in state history. She began her tenure on October 9, 2018.

Legal offices
Preceded by E. James Burke	Justice of the Wyoming Supreme Court; 2018–present	Incumbent
