= Independence, Ohio =

- City
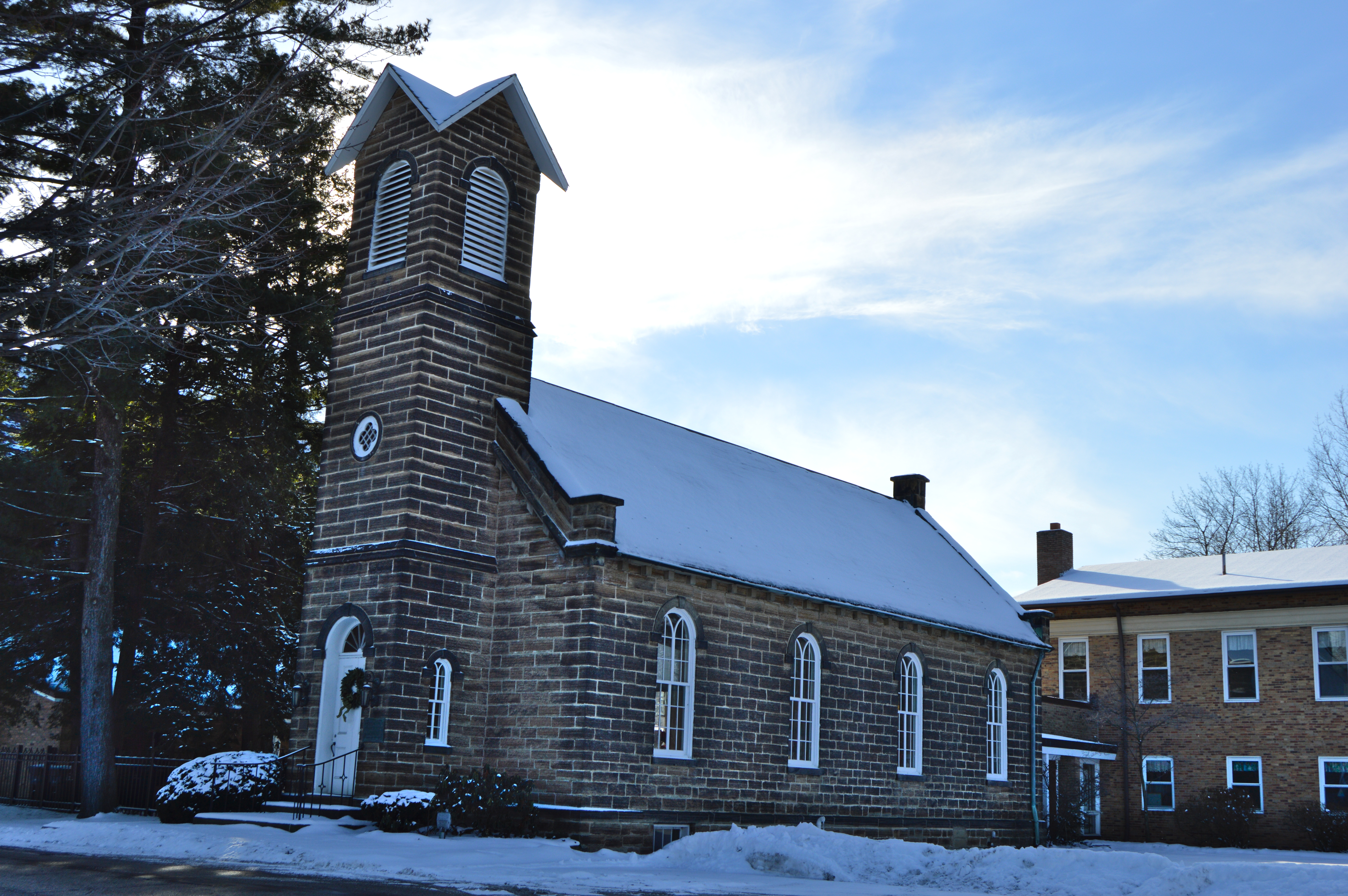
- Independence Presbyterian Church

- Seal
- Interactive map of Independence, Ohio
- Location within Ohio Location within the United States
- Coordinates: 41°22′55″N 81°38′27″W
- Country: United States
- State: Ohio
- County: Cuyahoga

Government
  - Type: Mayor-council
  - Mayor: Ryan Scarcella (N)

Area
  - Total: 9.63 sq mi (24.94 km^{2})
  - Land: 9.53 sq mi (24.67 km^{2})
  - Water: 0.10 sq mi (0.26 km^{2})
- Elevation: 860 ft (260 m)

Population (2020)
  - Total: 7,585
  - Density: 796.1/sq mi (307.39/km^{2})
- census
- Demonym: Independencian
- Time zone: UTC-4 (EST)
  - Summer (DST): UTC-4 (EDT)
- Zip code: 44131
- Area code: 216
- FIPS code: 39-37240
- GNIS feature ID: 1064885
- Website: http://www.independenceohio.org

Independence is a city in Cuyahoga County, Ohio, United States. The population was 7,584 at the 2020 census. A suburb of Cleveland, it is a part of the Cleveland metropolitan area.

== History ==
Independence was originally called Center and was renamed in 1830.

== Geography ==
Independence is located at 41°22′55″N 81°38′27″W.

According to the United States Census Bureau, the city has a total area of 9.64 square miles (24.97 km^{2}), of which 9.54 square miles (24.71 km^{2}) is land and 0.10 square miles (0.26 km^{2}) is water.

Much of the land area in Independence is used by the intersection of I-480 and I-77. The I-77/I-480 interchange is a four-level stack interchange, but locals often refer to as the cloverleaf, as it largely replaced a nearby interchange of that type. The larger interchange opened in 1940, but construction of the Willow Freeway, which became I-77, was stalled by World War II and was not completed until the 1950s. In the late 1970s, I-480 connected into I-77. The original 1939 cloverleaf is still in existence on Granger and Brecksville Roads. It is still in use today, generally for local traffic.

In the 1970s, many Cleveland businesses needed backup and extra office space from their downtown Cleveland offices. In the 1970s, the Rockside corridor was developed into offices and numerous hotels to help downtown Cleveland. In 1991, the Crown Center on Rockside Road was built, making it the tallest building between Downtown Cleveland and Akron. This area is referred as Cleveland's Silicon Valley.

== Demographics ==
Historical population
Census	Pop.	Note	%±
1880	262		—
1920	1,074		—
1930	1,525		42.0%
1940	1,815		19.0%
1950	3,105		71.1%
1960	6,568		111.5%
1970	7,034		7.1%
1980	6,607		−6.1%
1990	6,500		−1.6%
2000	7,109		9.4%
2010	7,133		0.3%
2020	7,584		6.3%
2025 (est.)	7,456		−1.7%

=== Racial and ethnic composition ===
Independence city, Ohio – Racial and ethnic composition Note: the US Census treats Hispanic/Latino as an ethnic category. This table excludes Latinos from the racial categories and assigns them to a separate category. Hispanics/Latinos may be of any race.
Race / Ethnicity (NH = Non-Hispanic)	Pop 2000	Pop 2010	Pop 2020	% 2000	% 2010	% 2020
White alone (NH)	6,898	6,833	6,902	97.03%	95.79%	91.01%
Black or African American alone (NH)	39	30	58	0.55%	0.42%	0.76%
Native American or Alaska Native alone (NH)	0	3	7	0.00%	0.04%	0.09%
Asian alone (NH)	92	135	217	1.29%	1.89%	2.86%
Native Hawaiian or Pacific Islander alone (NH)	0	0	0	0.00%	0.00%	0.00%
Other race alone (NH)	0	8	22	0.00%	0.11%	0.29%
Mixed race or Multiracial (NH)	22	47	228	0.31%	0.66%	3.01%
Hispanic or Latino (any race)	58	77	150	0.82%	1.08%	1.98%
Total	7,109	7,133	7,584	100.00%	100.00%	100.00%

=== 2020 census ===
As of the 2020 census, Independence had a population of 7,584. The median age was 46.4 years. 21.2% of residents were under the age of 18 and 22.0% of residents were 65 years of age or older. For every 100 females there were 96.7 males, and for every 100 females age 18 and over there were 94.1 males age 18 and over.

99.0% of residents lived in urban areas, while 1.0% lived in rural areas.

There were 2,914 households in Independence, of which 29.4% had children under the age of 18 living in them. Of all households, 61.2% were married-couple households, 12.9% were households with a male householder and no spouse or partner present, and 21.9% were households with a female householder and no spouse or partner present. About 22.6% of all households were made up of individuals and 13.1% had someone living alone who was 65 years of age or older.

There were 3,069 housing units, of which 5.1% were vacant. The homeowner vacancy rate was 0.9% and the rental vacancy rate was 4.1%.

Racial composition as of the 2020 census
Race	Number	Percent
White	6,945	91.6%
Black or African American	58	0.8%
American Indian and Alaska Native	11	0.1%
Asian	223	2.9%
Native Hawaiian and Other Pacific Islander	0	0.0%
Some other race	39	0.5%
Two or more races	308	4.1%
Hispanic or Latino (of any race)	150	2.0%

=== 2010 census ===
Largest ancestries (2010)	Percent
Polish	36.6%
Irish	19.7%
German	18.0%
Italian	17.1%
Czech	7.3%
Slovak	6.0%

As of the census of 2010, there were 7,133 people, 2,770 households, and 2,054 families living in the city. The population density was 747.7 inhabitants per square mile (288.7/km^{2}). There were 2,868 housing units at an average density of 300.6 per square mile (116.1/km^{2}). The racial makeup of the city was 96.6% White, 0.4% African American, 0.1% Native American, 1.9% Asian, 0.2% from other races, and 0.8% from two or more races. Hispanic or Latino people of any race were 1.1% of the population.

There were 2,770 households, of which 30.9% had children under the age of 18 living with them, 61.8% were married couples living together, 8.5% had a female householder with no husband present, 3.9% had a male householder with no wife present, and 25.8% were non-families. 23.3% of all households were made up of individuals, and 13.4% had someone living alone who was 65 years of age or older. The average household size was 2.57 and the average family size was 3.05.

The median age in the city was 47 years. 22.9% of residents were under the age of 18; 6.1% were between the ages of 18 and 24; 17.9% were from 25 to 44; 33.5% were from 45 to 64; and 19.5% were 65 years of age or older. The gender makeup of the city was 48.5% male and 51.5% female.

Of the city's population over the age of 25, 36.0% held a bachelor's degree or higher.

=== 2000 census ===
Largest ancestries (2000)	Percent
Polish	32.3%
German	20.2%
Italian	16.7%
Irish	10.7%
English	7.3%
Slovak	7.0%

As of the census of 2000, there were 7,109 people, 2,673 households, and 2,020 families living in the city. The population density was 741.6 inhabitants per square mile (286.3/km^{2}). There were 2,726 housing units at an average density of 284.4 per square mile (109.8/km^{2}). The racial makeup of the city was 97.58% White, 0.58% African American, 1.29% Asian, 0.14% from other races, and 0.41% from two or more races. Hispanic or Latino people of any race were 0.82% of the population.

There were 2,673 households, out of which 30.5% had children under the age of 18 living with them, 65.6% were married couples living together, 7.3% had a female householder with no husband present, and 24.4% were non-families. 21.8% of all households were made up of individuals, and 13.3% had someone living alone who was 65 years of age or older. The average household size was 2.63 and the average family size was 3.10.

In the city, the population was spread out, with 24.1% under the age of 18, 6.0% from 18 to 24, 23.1% from 25 to 44, 25.5% from 45 to 64, and 21.3% who were 65 years of age or older. The median age was 43 years. For every 100 females, there were 90.2 males. For every 100 females age 18 and over, there were 87.6 males.

The median income for a household in the city was $57,733, and the median income for a family was $65,059. Males had a median income of $49,741 versus $34,038 for females. The per capita income for the city was $26,447. About 2.4% of families and 3.6% of the population were below the poverty line, including 2.5% of those under age 18 and 4.2% of those age 65 or over.

== Education ==
The Independence Local School District operates Independence Primary School, Independence Middle School and Independence High School. There is also St. Michael's Catholic School, under the Diocese of Cleveland. Independence is also home to the Kent State University College of Podiatric Medicine.

== Sports ==
Independence is the home of the Cleveland Cavaliers training facility.

== Notable people ==
- Kathrine Baumann, former actress and designer
- Tom Boerwinkle, National Basketball Association player
- Jessica Eye, mixed martial arts fighter
- Joe Kovacs, puppeteer
- Stipe Miocic, mixed martial arts fighter
- Louis J. O'Marr, 13th Attorney General of Wyoming
- Nadine Secunde, operatic soprano
- Jim Trakas, former member of the Ohio House of Representatives
