= Charlie Brown (rugby union, born 1878) =

South African rugby union player (b. 1878, d. 1944)

- Born: Charles Barker Brown; 29 January 1878 Kuruman, South Africa
- Died: 18 June 1944 (aged 66)
- School: SACS

Rugby union career
- Position: Forward
Provincial / State sides
Years	Team	Apps	(Points)
- Western Province
International career
Years	Team	Apps	(Points)
1903	South Africa	3	(0)
- Correct as of 3 June 2019

Charlie Brown (29 January 1878 – 18 June 1944) was a South African international rugby union player who played as a forward.

He made three appearances for South Africa in 1903.
