= E. James Burke =

American judge

James Burke

Chief Justice of the Wyoming Supreme Court
- In office July 1, 2014 – July 1, 2018
- Preceded by: Marilyn S. Kite
- Succeeded by: Michael K. Davis

Justice of the Wyoming Supreme Court
- In office January 2005 – October 8, 2018
- Appointed by: Dave Freudenthal
- Preceded by: Larry Lehman
- Succeeded by: Kari Jo Gray

Personal details
- Born: June 26, 1949 (age 77) Wilmington, Delaware, U.S.
- Education: Saint Joseph's University (BS); University of Wyoming (JD)

E. James Burke (born June 26, 1949) is a former justice of the Wyoming Supreme Court. He served on the high court from 2005 to 2018. He is also served as chief justice of the court, having been elected by his fellow justices in 2014. He previously served in the state as a district court justice. He retired from the court on October 8, 2018.

Legal offices
Preceded by Larry Lehman	Justice of the Wyoming Supreme Court; 2005–2018	Succeeded by Kari Jo Gray
Preceded by Marilyn S. Kite	Chief Justice of the Wyoming Supreme Court; 2014–2018	Succeeded by Michael K. Davis
