= Charles Rufus Brown =

American Baptist clergyman and biblical scholar

Charles Rufus Brown (1849–1914) was an American Baptist clergyman and biblical scholar. He did not originally intend such a career, even though his father was a Baptist clergyman. Aiming at the United States Naval Academy, Annapolis, Maryland, he graduated and was serving in the Navy when he felt a call to the clergy. Resigning, he spent the next several years learning the languages and scholarship of the Bible, publishing and teaching at last in the American School of Oriental Research in Jerusalem. He came home to a small Baptist ministry in New Hampshire.

== Biography ==
He was born in Kingston, New Hampshire, graduated from the United States Naval Academy and reached the grade of master (1871) in the United States navy, from which he resigned in 1875.

Thereafter he studied at Harvard, Newton Theological Institution, Union Theological Seminary, and the universities of Berlin and Leipzig. In 1883 he became associate professor of biblical interpretation and in 1886 professor of Hebrew and cognate languages in Newton Theological Institution. In 1910-11 he was resident director of the American School of Oriental Research in Jerusalem.

== Publications ==
He published An Aramaic Method (1884; second edition, 1893), a translation of the book of Jeremiah (1906), and a Commentary on Jeremiah (1907).
