= Charlie Brown (rugby union, born 1909) =

Scotland international rugby union player

- Full name: Charles Hogendorf Campbell Brown
- Born: 12 November 1909 Polmont, Scotland
- Died: 25 October 1976 (aged 66) Perth, Scotland

Rugby union career
- Position: Wing
International career
Years	Team	Apps	(Points)
1929	Scotland	1	(3)

Charles Hogendorf Campbell Brown (12 November 1909 – 25 October 1976) was a Scottish international rugby union player.

Brown hailed from Polmont near Falkirk and was a product of Dunfermline RFC.

A pacy wing three–quarter, Brown gained a Scotland cap during the 1929 Five Nations, deputising for an injured Jimmy Dykes in their match against England at Murrayfield. He scored a try in a Scotland win, allowing them to regain the Calcutta Cup.

Brown moved to Dundee for business in 1933 and joined Dundee HSFP.

== See also ==
- List of Scotland national rugby union players
