= Charles Stuart Brown =

American judge (1918–1997)

Chief Justice of the Wyoming Supreme Court
- In office 1987 – June 30, 1988

Associate Justice of the Wyoming Supreme Court
- In office March 26, 1981 – 1987

Personal details
- Born: June 30, 1918 Freedom, Wyoming, U.S.
- Died: December 12, 1997 (aged 79) Cheyenne, Wyoming, U.S.
- Spouse: Jane Hurst (m. 1941)
- Children: 10
- Education: Utah State University (BS); University of Utah (JD); Georgetown University
- Occupation: Judge

Military service
- Allegiance: United States
- Branch/service: United States Army (United States Army Reserve)
- Years of service: 1942–1946
- Rank: Colonel
- Battles/wars: World War II

Charles Stuart Brown (June 30, 1918 – December 12, 1997) was an associate justice and chief justice of the Wyoming Supreme Court from March 26, 1981, until his retirement on June 30, 1988.

== Early life, education, and career ==
Born in Freedom, Wyoming, Brown was an active member of the Church of Jesus Christ of Latter-day Saints and served missions through the church in Texas and Louisiana from 1938 to 1940. He served in the U.S. Army as an engineer in the South West Pacific theatre of World War II from 1942 to 1946. He received a B.S. from Utah State University in 1943 and worked as an elementary school principal before receiving his J.D. from the University of Utah in 1950. He was admitted to the Utah Bar and practiced law in Kemmerer, Wyoming, between then and 1965, except when called to other vocations. He was recalled to military service as a reservist during the Korean War, where he also served as an engineer. He was a bishop in Fairview from 1952 to 1955.

Brown was a State Bar Commissioner from 1955 to 1957 and city attorney for Afton, Wyoming, from 1955 to 1959 and was elected county attorney of Lincoln County, Wyoming, in 1958. He thereafter moved to Washington, D.C., where he was an Associate Solicitor of the United States Department of Interior, from 1961 to 1962, while also attending law school graduate program at Georgetown University.

== Judicial service ==
In 1964, Brown became a district judge of the Wyoming Third Judicial District. On March 26, 1981, Brown was appointed to the Wyoming Supreme Court by Governor Ed Herschler. He became Chief Justice of the court in 1987, holding that position until his retirement. He also chaired the Wyoming Judicial Conference in 1987.

== Personal life ==
Brown married Jane Hurst in Salt Lake City on August 6, 1941. They had ten children, of whom a daughter and infant twin sons died before Brown; at the time of his death, he was survived by two sons, five daughters, 27 grandchildren and three great-grandchildren.

Brown retired from the U.S. Army Reserve as a colonel, serving as an appellate judge. He died in Cheyenne.
