= List of Wyoming attorneys general =

Wyoming Attorney General is the title of the senior legal officer of the State of Wyoming. The attorney general is appointed by the Governor.

The current attorney general is Keith G. Kautz.

== Attorneys general of Wyoming ==
#	Image	Name	Took office	Left office	Party
1		Hugo Donzelmann	1890	1891	Republican
2		Charles N. Potter	1891	1895	Republican
3		Benjamin F. Fowler	1895	1898	Republican
4		Josiah Van Orsdel	1898	1905	Republican
5		W.E. Mullen	1905	1911	Republican
6		Douglas A. Preston	1911	1919	Democratic
7		William L. Walls	1919	1923	Republican
8		David J. Howell	1923	1927	Democratic
9		William O. Wilson	1927	1931	Republican
10		James A. Greenwood	1931	1933	Republican
11		Ray E. Lee	1933	1939	Democratic
12		Ewing Thomas Kerr	1939	1943	Republican
13		Louis J. O'Marr	1943	1947	Democraticic
14		Norman B. Gray	1947	1951	Democratic
15		Harry S. Harnsberger	1951	1953	Republican
16		Howard Black	1953	1955	Republican
17		George F. Guy	1955	1957	Republican
18		Thomas O. Miller	1957	1959	Republican
19		Norman B. Gray	1959	1963	Democratic
20		John F. Raper	1963	1965	Republican
21		Dean W. Borthwick	1965	1967	Republican
22		James E. Barrett	1967	1971	Republican
23		Clarence Brimmer	1971	1974	Republican
24		David B. Kennedy	1974	1975	Republican
25		V. Frank Mendicino	1975	1978	Democratic
26		John J. Rooney	1978	1979	Democratic
27		John D. Troughton	1979	1981	Democratic
28		Steve Freudenthal	1981	1983	Democratic
29		Arch McClintock	1983	1987	Democratic
30		Joseph Meyer	1987	1995	Republican
31		William U. Hill	1995	1998	Republican
32		Gay Woodhouse	1999	2001	Republican
33		Hoke MacMillan	2001	2002	Republican
34		Patrick J. Crank	2002	2007	Democratic
35		Bruce Salzburg	2007	2011	Democratic
36		Gregory A. Phillips	2011	2013	Democratic
37		Peter K. Michael	2013	2019	Republican
38		Bridget Hill	2019	2025	Republican
–		Ryan Schelhaas; Acting	2025	2025	Republican
39		Keith G. Kautz	2025	present	Republican
