= Wyoming District Courts =

State trial courts in Wyoming, US

Wyoming District Courts are the state trial courts of general jurisdiction in Wyoming.

The District Courts hears all felony criminal cases and civil cases with an amount in controversy in excess of $50,000. The District Courts also exercise exclusive original jurisdiction in all juvenile and probate matters. The district courts also hear appeals from lower Circuit Courts, which are courts of limited jurisdiction that hear small claims and misdemeanors,

Like justices of the Wyoming Supreme Court, district judges are chosen via the Wyoming Judicial Nominating Commission. The Governor appoints a judge from a list of three qualified persons submitted by the Judicial Nominating Commission, and retention elections are held as for Supreme Court justices. District judges serve six-year terms. A district judge must be an attorney at least 28 years old, a United States citizen, and a resident of Wyoming for at least two years. Like Supreme Court justices, district judges have a mandatory retirement age of 70.

Each district judge hires a court reporter, who keep a verbatim record of court proceedings and prepares a written transcript of proceedings, which are often necessary for appeals or other further legal action. Court reporters also serve as assistants to district judge with administrative duties. Some district courts have full-time or part-time law clerks.

An elected clerk of court in each county keeps the records of the district court, including case files (which including the written records of a case, including complaint, answers, pleadings, orders, judgment, and opinion) and a docket. Clerks receive and transmit fees and monies deposited with the court, and manages the calling and initial examination of the jurors for the court.

Map of Wyoming District Courts First Judicial District Second Judicial District Third Judicial District Fourth Judicial District Fifth Judicial District Sixth Judicial District Seventh Judicial District Eighth Judicial District Ninth Judicial District

Wyoming's 23 counties are divided in nine districts with a total of 22 judges. District court is held in the county seat of each county, and judges regularly travel to all counties within their district to hear cases that arise there.

- First Judicial District – Laramie
- Second Judicial District – Albany, Carbon
- Third Judicial District – Lincoln, Sweetwater, Uinta
- Fourth Judicial District – Johnson, Sheridan
- Fifth Judicial District – Big Horn, Hot Springs, Park, Washakie
- Sixth Judicial District – Campbell, Crook, Weston
- Seventh Judicial District – Natrona
- Eighth Judicial District – Converse, Goshen, Niobrara, Platte
- Ninth Judicial District – Fremont, Sublette, Teton

Because Wyoming has no intermediate appellate court, appeals from the district courts go directly to the Supreme Court.

In 2019, the Chancery Court of the State of Wyoming (Wyoming Chancery Court) was created by legislation, with a limited defined subject matter jurisdiction over business, commercial, and trust litigation. District court judges share concurrent jurisdiction over these same subject matter case types with the Chancery Court under Wyoming Statute § 5-13-115(d).
