= Marilyn S. Kite =

American judge

Marilyn Kite

Chief Justice of Wyoming
- In office July 1, 2010 – July 1, 2014
- Preceded by: Barton R. Voigt
- Succeeded by: E. James Burke

Justice of the Wyoming Supreme Court
- In office June 2, 2000 – August 3, 2015
- Appointed by: Jim Geringer

Personal details
- Born: October 2, 1947 (age 79) Laramie, Wyoming, U.S.
- Spouse(s): Roy "Skip" Jacobson, Jr.
- Children: Gus Jacobson
- Education: University of Wyoming

Marilyn Stebner Kite (born October 2, 1947) is an American lawyer who served as a justice of the Wyoming Supreme Court from 2000 to 2015. She was elected chief justice by her fellow justices in 2010 and served one term.

She is a native of Laramie, Wyoming and attended law school there at the University of Wyoming. Kite was the first woman named to the position of chief justice in Wyoming.

== See also ==
- List of female state supreme court justices
