= University of Wyoming College of Law =

Public law school in Laramie, Wyoming, US

Coordinates: 41.31273°N 105.57088°W

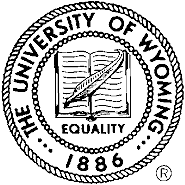
- Established: 1920
- School type: Public
- Location: Laramie, Wyoming, United States
- Enrollment: 220
- USNWR ranking: 111th (2024)
- Website: www.uwyo.edu/law/

The University of Wyoming College of Law is the law school of the University of Wyoming and the only law school located in Wyoming. It is situated in the Rocky Mountains in Laramie, Wyoming at 7,165 ft. between the Laramie Mountains and Snowy Range Mountains. Frequently, it is referred to as "Law at its Highest Point". Established in 1920, the law school offers the J.D. degree in law, as well "a joint JD/MA in Environment and Natural Resources and joint degrees in JD/MPA and JD/MBA. Other electives include coverage of trial and appellate practice, business planning, estate planning, corporate and commercial law, administrative law, consumer law, international law, Indian law, health law, and education law."

The college is accredited by the American Bar Association and its graduates are eligible for admission to the bar in every state. In addition, the college is a member of the Association of American Law Schools. The University of Wyoming College of Law is also specially recognized by being admitted as a member of the Order of the Coif. According to Wyoming's official 2018 ABA-required disclosures, 71.4% of the Class of 2017 obtained full-time, long-term, JD-required employment within nine months of graduation.

== History ==
Front of University of Wyoming College of Law

The University of Wyoming College of Law was founded in 1920. Classes were held on one floor of the university library building until the College of Law moved to a separate facility in 1953. Because of increasing class size, the College of Law relocated to its current building in 1977. Considerable library space and a variety of other rooms were added to the building in 1993. The building contains three classrooms, a large moot courtroom, a small moot court room, two seminar rooms, a student lounge area, lockers for every student, the law library (which include yearly study carrel), and faculty and staff offices.

== Moot Court Rooms ==
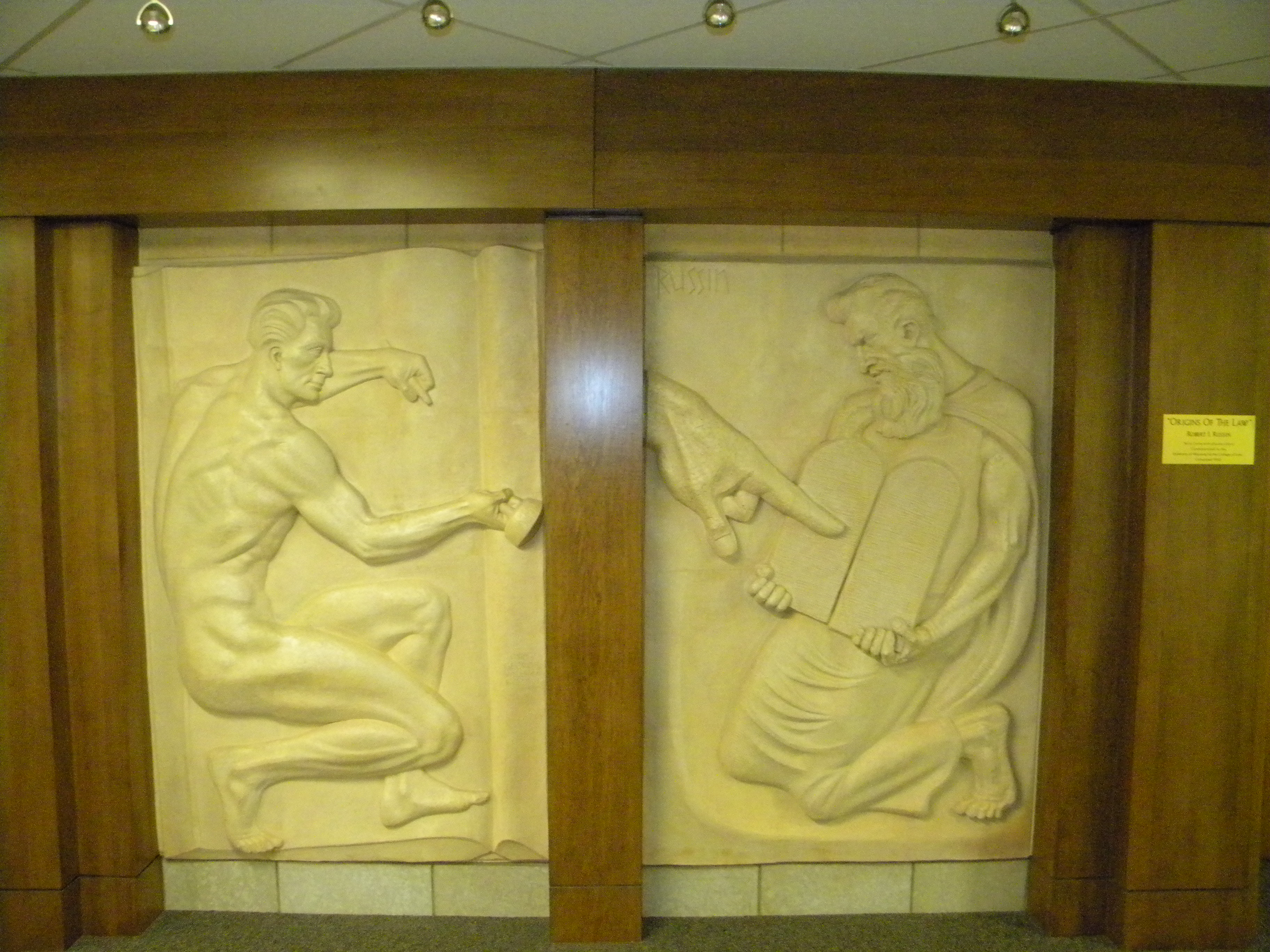
Entrance to Large Moot Court Room

Inside Large Moot Court Room

In 2009, the University of Wyoming College of Law finished construction on a large addition to the college of law that expanded the main lecture hall and added two technologically advanced moot court rooms. The main moot court room is the main lecture hall, but includes a retrieving class room wall that opens up into the large moot court room.

This court room has become so useful that since it was finished, the Wyoming Supreme Court and the U.S. Tenth Circuit Court of Appeals have both used it to hear oral arguments.

== Statistics ==
The University of Wyoming College of Law is a public law school. It only has a full-time program that starts in the fall with a 12.4 to 1 student to faculty ratio. Tuition runs $16,350 for residents and $33,125 for nonresidents. Statistics for 2018 show the median LSAT was a 152 and the median GPA was a 3.39. Those numbers along with all numbers have been on the rise since Dean Easton took his place at the school in 2009. However, Dean Easton resigned as dean in 2013 citing an inability to work with former President Sternberg of the university. President Sternberg resigned shortly after, and Steve Easton remained on faculty as a professor. The average first-time bar passing rate for the class of 2017 was 74.17% with the majority of students taking the bar in Wyoming and Colorado. The reported average salary for the class of 2016 was $61,881 for graduates working in the private sector, and $53,473 for graduates in the public sector.

== George William Hopper Law Library ==
The George W. Hopper Law Library at the University of Wyoming College of Law serves the students, faculty and staff of the College of Law, as well as the university community and the state. The library's collection includes 206,120 treatises, microfiche, law reviews, federal and state statutes, administrative decisions, digests, looseleafs, citators, encyclopedias, reporters, and audio-visual resources. The library has access to many electronic legal databases, such as Lexis and Westlaw. While many of the databases are only accessible to College of Law students, faculty and staff, some are accessible on public computers within the library. The library is open to the public, and is used by attorneys throughout the state as well as self-represented litigants.

The library, which is named for a 1956 graduate of the College of Law, includes multiple study rooms that can be reserved for student use, and study carrels which are assigned to students through a lottery run by the Potter Law Club. The library is open seven days a week during the fall and spring semesters.

== Wyoming Law Review ==
University of Wyoming College of Law Sept, 2010

The Wyoming Law Review is the legal publication at the University of Wyoming College of Law. Founded in 1946, the law review publishes semiannually on a variety of topics. The law review is entirely managed by students of the University of Wyoming College of Law.

== Employment ==
According to Wyoming's official 2018 ABA-required disclosures, 71.4% of the Class of 2013 obtained full-time, long-term, JD-required employment within nine months of graduation. Wyoming's Law School Transparency under-employment score is 15.7%, indicating the percentage of the Class of 2017 unemployed, pursuing an additional degree, or working in a non-professional, short-term, or part-time job nine months after graduation.

== Costs ==
socrates in front on the law school

The total cost of attendance (indicating the cost of tuition, fees, and living expenses) at Wyoming for the 2018–2019 academic year is $32,628 for residents and $49,483 for nonresidents. The Law School Transparency estimated debt-financed cost of attendance for three years is $122,909 for residents and $187,400 for nonresidents.

== Notable alumni ==
The University of Wyoming College of Law has many alumni Wyoming Supreme Court Judges and 10th circuit judges. Currently, all of the Wyoming Supreme Court judges are graduates from the College of Law along with 4 10th circuit judges.

- James L. Applegate (LLB 1958), Democratic member of the Wyoming House of Representatives
- James E. Barrett (J.D. 1949), Wyoming Attorney General, Judge United States Court of Appeals for the Tenth Circuit
- Wade Brorby (J.D. 1958), Senior Judge United States Court of Appeals for the Tenth Circuit
- Ken Buck (J.D. 1985), U.S. Representative from the 4th District of Colorado
- E. James Burke (J.D. 1977), Justice of the Wyoming Supreme Court
- Dave Freudenthal (J.D. 1980), 31st Governor of Wyoming
- Michael Golden (J.D. 1967), Justice of the Wyoming Supreme Court
- Oscar A. Hall (J.D. 1952), Wyoming state representative
- John Hickey (LL.B. 1934), United States Senator from Wyoming, 24th Governor of Wyoming and Judge of the United States Court of Appeals for the Tenth Circuit
- William U. Hill (J.D. 1974), Former Chief Justice and current Justice of the Wyoming Supreme Court
- Alan B. Johnson (J.D. 1964), Judge United States District Court for the District of Wyoming
- Robert H. Johnson (J.D. 1963), State senator from Rock Springs
- Marilyn Kite (J.D. 1974), Justice of the Wyoming Supreme Court
- Michael R. Murphy (J.D. 1972), Judge United States Court of Appeals for the Tenth Circuit
- Bob Nicholas (J.D. 1985), State representative from Cheyenne since 2011
- Terrence L. O'Brien, Senior Judge of the United States Court of Appeals for the Tenth Circuit
- Charles Pelkey (J.D. 2009), Minority Whip, Wyoming House of Representatives, State representative from Laramie, 2015 to 2021.
- Gregory A. Phillips, Judge of the United States Court of Appeals for the Tenth Circuit
- Alan Simpson (J.D. 1958), United States Senator from Wyoming
- Gerry Spence (LL.B. 1952), Attorney
- Mike Sullivan (J.D. 1964), United States Ambassador to Ireland and 29th Governor of Wyoming
- Barton Voigt (J.D. 1979), Former Chief Justice of the Wyoming Supreme Court
- James G. Watt (J.D. 1962), United States Secretary of the Interior
- Matt Mead (J.D. 1987), 32nd Governor of Wyoming
- Ed Murray (J.D. 1983), 21st Secretary of State of Wyoming
- Kevin Ellmann (J.D. 1997) Prominent Colorado Attorney and Judge.

== Notable faculty ==
- Johanna Bond, dean of Rutgers Law School
