= Wyoming Supreme Court =

Highest court in the U.S. state of Wyoming

- Seal of the Supreme Court of Wyoming

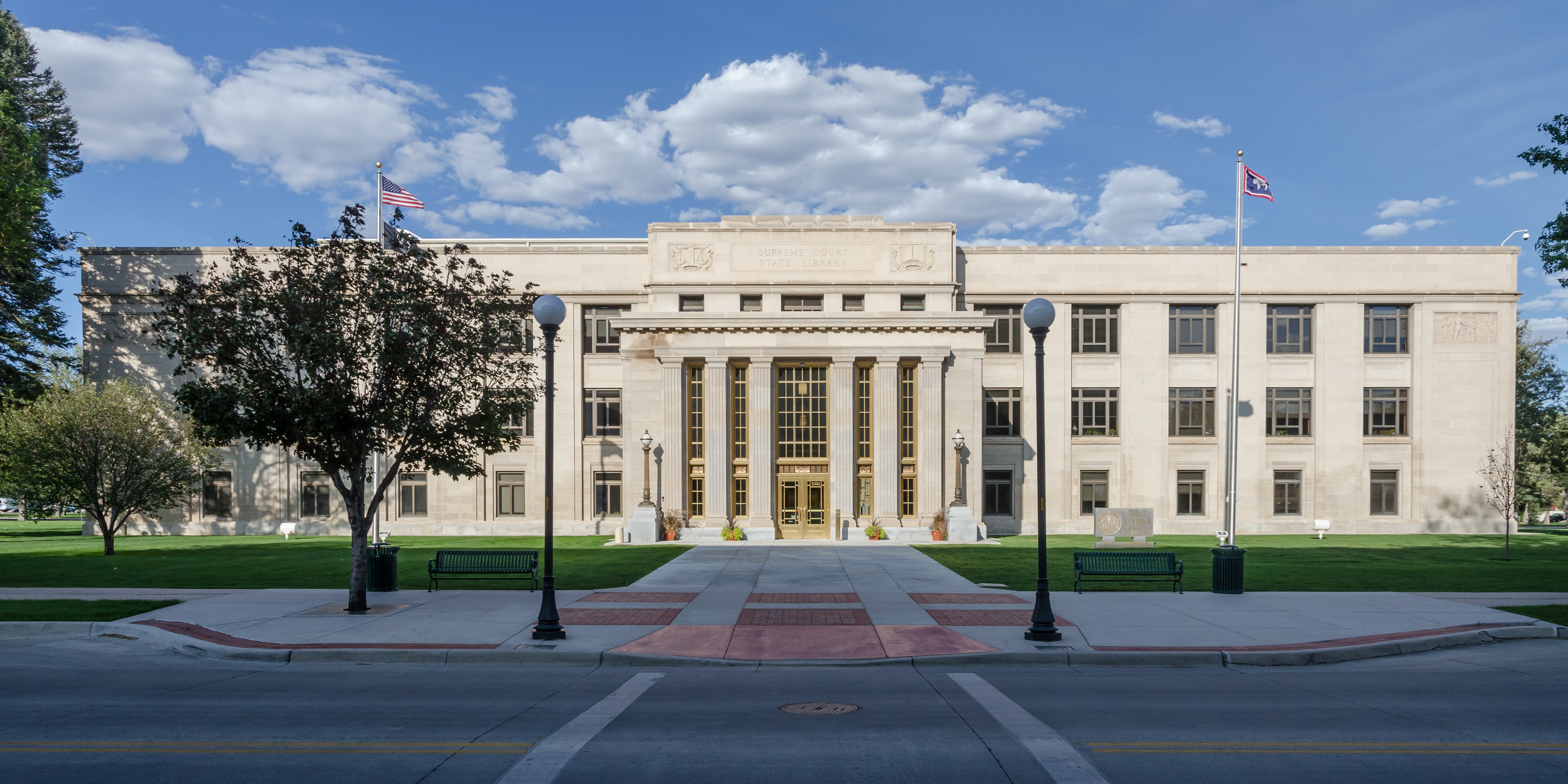
- Wyoming Supreme Court Building
- Interactive map of Wyoming Supreme Court
- Jurisdiction: Wyoming
- Location: Cheyenne
- Composition method: Executive appointment
- Authorised by: Wyoming State Constitution
- Appeals to: Supreme Court of the United States
- Judge term length: 8 years
- Number of positions: 5
- Website: Official website

Chief Justice
- Currently: Lynne J. Boomgaarden
- Since: May 28, 2025
- Lead position ends: May 28, 2029
- Jurist term ends: 2028

The Wyoming Supreme Court is the highest court in the U.S. state of Wyoming. The court consists of a chief justice and four associate justices. Each Justice is appointed by the governor of Wyoming from a list of three nominees submitted by the judicial nominating commission, for an eight-year term. One year after being appointed, a new justice stands for retention in office on a statewide ballot at the next general election. If a majority votes for retention, the justice serves the remainder of the term and may stand for retention for succeeding eight-year terms by means of a nonpartisan retention ballot every eight years. A justice must be a lawyer with at least nine years' experience in the law, at least 30 years old, and a United States citizen who has resided in Wyoming for at least three years. Justices must retire when they reach 70 years of age.

The five Justices select the Chief Justice from amongst themselves. The person chosen serves as Chief Justice for four years. However, Richard V. Thomas of Cheyenne, a justice from 1974 to 2001, was chief justice only for two years (1985–1986).

== Justices ==
=== Current justices ===
As of September 14, 2026.

| Name | Born | Start | Term ends | Mandatory retirement | Appointer | Law school |
|---|---|---|---|---|---|---|
| Lynne J. Boomgaarden, Chief Justice | 1961 (age 64–65) | February 20, 2018 (Note: Became Chief Justice on May 28, 2025.) | 2029 | 2031 | Matt Mead (R) | Wyoming |
| Kari Jo Gray | September 20, 1960 (age 66) | October 9, 2018 | 2029 | 2030 | Matt Mead (R) | Wyoming |
| John G. Fenn | 1974 (age 51–52) | January 17, 2022 | 2033 | 2044 | Mark Gordon (R) | Wyoming |
| Robert Jarosh | January 13, 1971 (age 55) | March 27, 2024 | 2035 | 2041 | Mark Gordon (R) | Wyoming |
| Bridget Hill | 1974 (age 51–52) | May 28, 2025 | 2029 | 2044 | Mark Gordon (R) | Wyoming |

== Notable cases ==
- In re Neely, 390 P.3d 728 (holding that a judge had violated Wyoming's code of judicial ethics by announcing that she would not perform same-sex marriages)
