= Mike Sullivan (Wyoming politician) =

American politician & diplomat (born 1939)

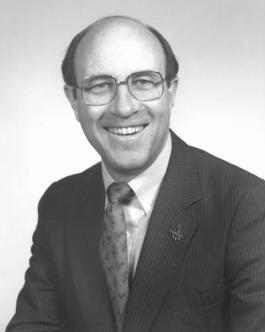

United States Ambassador to Ireland
- In office October 22, 1998 – June 20, 2001
- President: Bill Clinton; George W. Bush
- Preceded by: Jean Kennedy Smith
- Succeeded by: Richard J. Egan

29th Governor of Wyoming
- In office January 5, 1987 – January 2, 1995
- Preceded by: Edgar Herschler
- Succeeded by: Jim Geringer

Personal details
- Born: Michael John Sullivan; September 22, 1939 (age 87) Omaha, Nebraska, U.S.
- Party: Democratic
- Other political affiliations: Republican (2022)
- Spouse: Jane Metzler
- Children: 3
- Relatives: Joseph Sullivan (grandfather)
- Education: University of Wyoming (BS, JD)

Michael John Sullivan (born September 22, 1939) is an American lawyer, diplomat, and politician who served as the 29th governor of Wyoming from 1987 to 1995, and United States ambassador to Ireland from 1998 to 2001, as a member of the Democratic Party. Prior to his gubernatorial tenure, he was active in local politics in Natrona County, Wyoming.

Sullivan was born in Omaha, Nebraska, as a member of a family active in the Wyoming Legislature and grew up in Douglas, Wyoming. He was educated at the University of Wyoming. He practiced law and became involved in local politics with his service on the Natrona County Memorial Hospital board. Sullivan won in the 1986 and 1990 gubernatorial elections despite being outspent both times by Pete Simpson and Mary Mead.

During Sullivan's gubernatorial tenure he became the first governor in Wyoming's history to have his veto overturned, appointed three people to the Wyoming Supreme Court, oversaw Wyoming's only criminal execution after Furman v. Georgia, led the passage of a holiday in Martin Luther King Jr.'s honor, and chaired the Western Governors Association. He unsuccessfully ran for a seat in the U.S. Senate in 1994 before being appointed as the ambassador to Ireland by President Bill Clinton. He was the first governor to endorse Clinton during the 1992 Democratic presidential primaries and co-chaired his campaign in Wyoming during both presidential campaigns.

== Early life ==
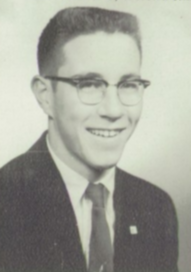
Mike Sullivan in 1957

Michael John Sullivan was born in Omaha, Nebraska, on September 22, 1939, to Margaret Elizabeth Sullivan and Joseph Sullivan Jr., who was elected as Converse County attorney as a member of the Democratic Party and served as the president of the Wyoming State Bar. His brother, Dan Sullivan, served in the Wyoming Senate as a member of the Republican Party. His uncle, John Sullivan, and grandfather, Joseph Sullivan, served in the Wyoming House of Representatives. Sullivan was raised in Douglas, Wyoming, as a member of the Catholic Church.

Sullivan graduated from Converse County High School, where he served as class president and was the salutatorian of the class of 1957. In 1961, he graduated from the University of Wyoming with a bachelor of science in petroleum engineering and later with a Juris Doctor in 1964. In college, he was a member of the student senate. In 1961, he married Jane Metzler, with whom he had three children. From 1968 to 1986, he worked as an attorney for Brown, Drew, Massey & Sullivan. He became a member of Delta Theta Phi in 1986.

== Career ==
=== Local politics ===
In 1974, Sullivan was speculated as a possible nominee for Wyoming's Attorney General by Governor-elect Edgar Herschler. During the 1970s, he served as president of the Natrona County Bar Association.

On January 27, 1976, Natrona County commissioners appointed Sullivan to the Building Appeal Board of Casper, Wyoming and the Natrona County Memorial Hospital board to fill the vacancy created by Bill Barton's death. On February 17, the board unanimously approved a resolution giving Sullivan another term. During his tenure on the hospital board, he served as its treasurer and president. On December 11, 1986, he resigned from the hospital board following his election as governor.

=== Governor ===
==== 1986 election ====
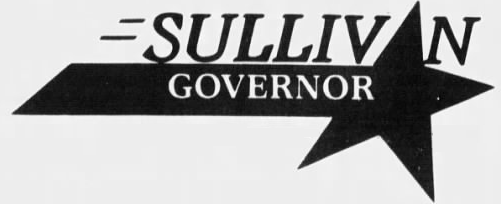
Mike Sullivan's gubernatorial campaign logo

On January 16, 1986, Sullivan said that he was considering running for the Democratic gubernatorial nomination. Former state Senator Bill Rector stated, "I think Mike [Sullivan] would be a good candidate," after he dropped out of the Democratic gubernatorial primary. On March 20, Sullivan announced that he would seek the Democratic nomination at a press conference inside his house in Casper.

Teno Roncalio, who served in the United States House of Representatives, supported Sullivan and was selected as an honorary chairman of his campaign. Charles Brown, the director of KTWO-TV News, was selected as Sullivan's campaign manager. On June 6, Sullivan filed to run for the Democratic gubernatorial nomination. In the primary, Sullivan defeated Pat McGuire, Keith Goodenough, and Al Hamburg after spending $102,219.

On September 3, Bryan Sharratt, a former candidate in the 1982 Senate election, was selected as Sullivan's campaign manager after Brown was assigned as the campaign's media coordinator. In the general election, Sullivan defeated Republican nominee Pete Simpson after spending $192,917. Sullivan did not expect to win the election, according to Joseph Meyer. He was the first person from Casper to win Wyoming's gubernatorial election since Bryant Butler Brooks in 1906.

==== 1990 election ====
Citizens for Sullivan was registered on December 7, 1989, by Marilyn Lyle and Mark Gifford, who met with Sullivan to allow campaign donations to be sent to him, although he stated that it was not a campaign announcement. He waited until after the passage of the 1991–1992 budget as he stated that doing so before its passage would politicize the budget. He announced his reelection campaign on May 1, 1990. He defeated Ron Clingman in the Democratic primary after raising $142,559 and spending $115,966. Richard Lindsey was his campaign manager.

Mark Hughes, chair of the Wyoming Republican Party, blamed their defeat in the 1986 election on the primary which had seven candidates that divided the loyalty of the party. The Republican's central committee held a meeting in 1989 to reduce the size of the primary field of candidates. Mary Mead won the Republican nomination after every candidate except for Nyla Murphy dropped out and endorsed her. Sullivan participated in five debates against Mead. He defeated Mead and Sullivan's margin of victory was the largest for any governor in Wyoming's history at the time. Mead spent $702,105 during the campaign while Sullivan spent $310,030.

==== Tenure ====
In 1991, Sullivan vetoed legislation allowing tax exemptions for wildcat oil drilling, which was overridden due to the Republicans gaining support from two Democratic members in the state senate and Eli Bebout in the state house. This was the first time in Wyoming's statehood that a governor's veto was overridden by the Wyoming Legislature. He criticized the leadership of the Republicans in the state house in 1988 for denying committee chair positions to Representatives Murphy and Mary Odde due to them not supporting an attempt to override one of Sullivan's vetoes. The Republicans gained a veto-proof majority in the state legislature following the 1992 elections. Sullivan vetoed multiple pieces of legislation altering the appointment to fill vacancies in partisan offices as to require the governor to choose from three people selected by the central committee of the party that held the office. However, the Republicans successfully overrode his veto in 1993.

Sullivan's first judicial appointment was his appointment of Nicholas Kalokathis to the First Judicial District in 1987. He made three appointments to the Wyoming Supreme Court, appointing Michael Golden to replace Charles Stuart Brown in 1988, William A. Taylor to replace Steve Urbigkit in 1992, and Larry Lehman to replace G. Joseph Cardine in 1994. He attempted to reappoint Carrol Orrison to the Wyoming Board of Equalization, but the state senate rejected his nomination. He appointed Joseph Meyer as Attorney General in 1987. He appealed to President Bill Clinton to appoint a Wyomingite to the United States Court of Appeals for the Tenth Circuit in 1993.

Sullivan was selected to replace Dave Freudenthal as the chairman of the Economic Development and Stabilization Board on January 21, 1987. He led an eighteen-member delegation to Australia and Taiwan for sixteen days in 1987 with the goal of increasing agricultural, business, and tourism investments with Wyoming, and he established a trade office in the Taipei World Trade Center in 1989. He was elected to the National Governors Association Executive Committee in 1988. He was the vice-chair of the Western Governors Association and succeeded South Dakota Governor George S. Mickelson as chair in 1991. He was offered the presidency of the Council of State Governments for 1992, but declined, stating, "I have enough outside activities".

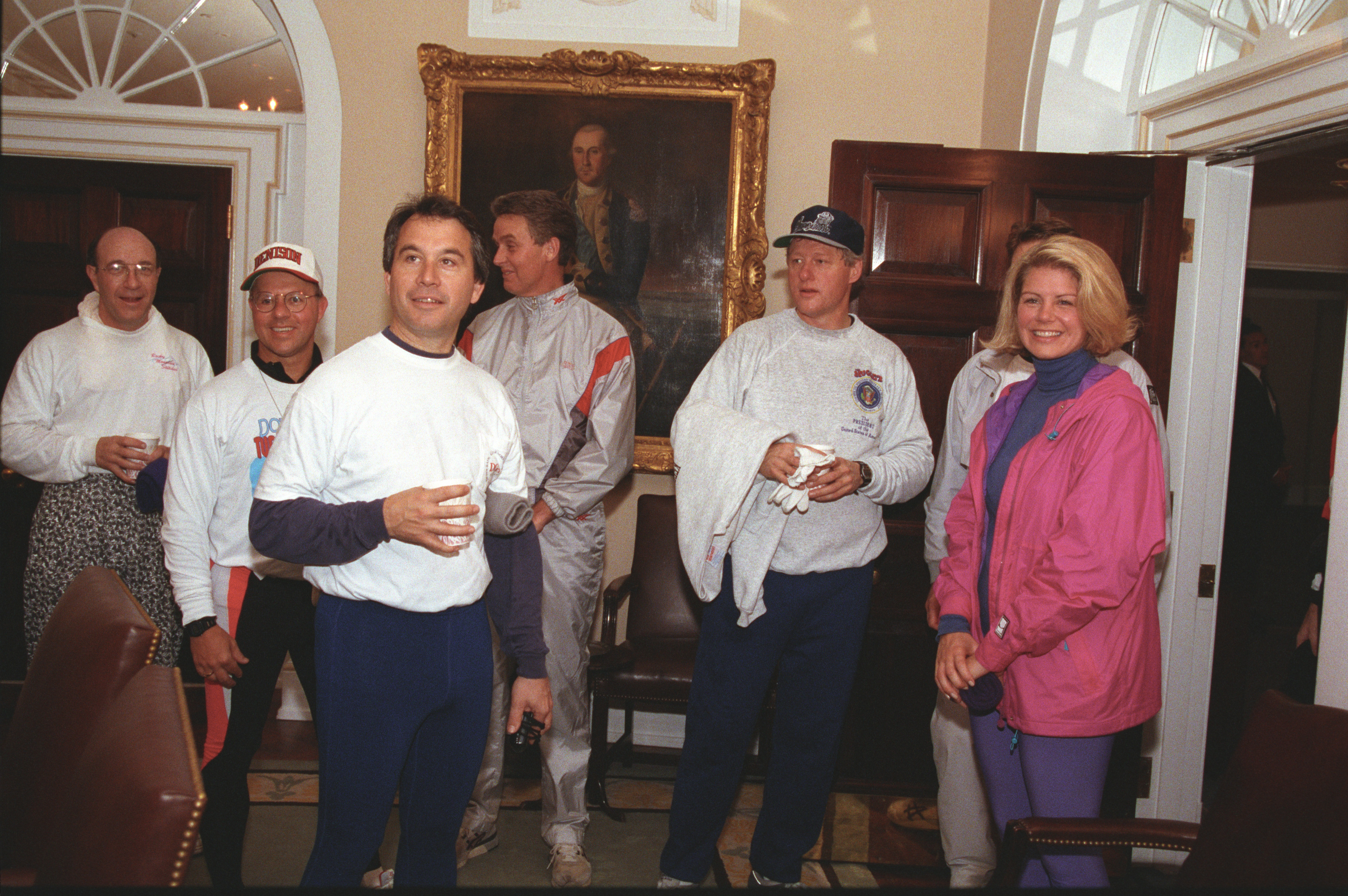
Sullivan (far left) with Bill Clinton at the 1993 National Governors Association Dinner

Sullivan remained neutral during the 1988 Democratic presidential primaries until he endorsed Michael Dukakis on May 6, 1988. He endorsed Clinton during the 1992 Democratic presidential primaries, the first governor to do so, and co-chaired Clinton's campaign in Wyoming with Secretary of State Kathy Karpan. He served as a superdelegate to the 1988 and 1992 Democratic National Conventions and chair of the Wyoming delegation to both conventions. Sullivan endorsed Sharratt in the 1988 election for a seat in the U.S. House of Representatives from Wyoming's at-large congressional district and John Vinich in the 1989 special election. Sullivan supported Dick Cheney's appointment as United States Secretary of Defense. A Wyoming chapter of the Democratic Leadership Council was organized in 1991, with Sullivan and Karpan as co-chairs.

When mobile phone service was provided to Wyoming, Sullivan performed some of the first mobile phone calls in the state when he called Mayor of Casper Judi Laird and received a call from Gerald Ford.

=== United States Senate campaign ===
On April 11, 1994, Sullivan announced that he would seek the Democratic nomination for the Senate election to succeed Republican Senator Malcolm Wallop. He filed to run on June 1. During the election, the campaign of Republican nominee Craig L. Thomas said in a fundraising letter that President Clinton had pledged $1 million to aid Sullivan's campaign. Sullivan and White House spokesman Joshua Silverman stated that no pledge was made.

On July 20, Sullivan returned a $1,350 contribution from U.S. Representative Lawrence J. Smith, made at a June 17 fundraiser in Florida held by the Democratic Senatorial Campaign Committee, after Thomas's campaign sent copies of the donation and news reports of Smith's misuse of campaign funds to Sullivan. Sullivan faced no opposition in the Democratic primary and was defeated by Thomas in the general election.

=== Ambassador ===
During the 1992 presidential election, Sullivan and Karpan published a letter calling for Wyoming voters to support Clinton and criticizing President George H. W. Bush for his negative campaign tactics, such as the Willie Horton ad during the 1988 presidential election. He supported Clinton's reelection campaign in the 1996 election and served as the co-chair of Clinton's Wyoming committee alongside Bob Schuster. He was considered for ambassadorships by the Clinton administration. He was considered as a candidate for Ambassador to the Holy See to replace Raymond Flynn, but that position was given to Lindy Boggs instead.

On June 10, 1998, The Washington Post reported that Sullivan was the leading candidate for Ambassador to Ireland, and Sullivan stated that he had been contacted by White House officials. On August 28, President Clinton announced his nomination of Sullivan for the ambassadorship. He was the tenth resident of Wyoming to receive a high-level diplomatic position. His nomination was approved by the United States Senate on October 21 and he was sworn in at a ceremony in the Indian Treaty Room on December 8. On January 21, 1999, Sullivan presented his credentials to President of Ireland Mary McAleese. Members of the Wyoming Legislature sent him a legislative resolution honoring his appointment. He served until June 20, 2001.

== Later life ==
It was speculated by Del Tinsley, publisher of Wyoming Livestock Roundup, that President George W. Bush would appoint Sullivan as Secretary of the Interior, but Bush appointed Gale Norton. In 2002, he was appointed chairman of the University of Wyoming's Institute for Environment and Natural Resources board of directors, replacing John Turner, who had resigned to become assistant secretary of state for the State Department Oceans and International Environmental and Scientific Affairs. In 2007, Sullivan was named as a distinguished alumnus of the University of Wyoming.

During the 2002 Wyoming gubernatorial election, Sullivan endorsed Democratic nominee Dave Freudenthal. During the 2008 Democratic presidential primaries, he supported Hillary Clinton for the nomination and was appointed onto a Wyoming steering committee for her campaign on February 28, 2008. He registered as a Republican in order to vote for Liz Cheney in the Republican primary in the 2022 election.

== Political positions ==
=== Economics and development ===
In 1986, Sullivan called for the Reagan administration to be open to an oil import tax as a stable oil price would help maintain the economies of energy producing states and Native American tribes. In 1987, Sullivan stated that "we didn't get any great support or reason for optimism" about the possibility of an oil import tax being implemented by Reagan after attending the National Governors Association. He opposed the Canada–United States Free Trade Agreement (CUSFTA), stating that it would negatively impact Wyoming's energy industry. The National Governors Association voted thirty to five in favor of giving its support to CUSFTA, with Sullivan against. He supported the North American Free Trade Agreement.

In 1986, Sullivan called for the Interstate Commerce Commission to prevent the Chicago and Northwestern Railroad from discontinuing its railroad line to Riverton, Wyoming, as it would be "contrary to the interests of Fremont County and the state of Wyoming." Sullivan sought for the construction of the Superconducting Super Collider inside Wyoming. Sullivan asked W. Graham Claytor Jr. to restore Amtrak's passenger service through Wyoming after the line was altered to travel through Colorado instead in 1983. Sullivan opposed the western United States being used for nuclear waste storage.

In 1992, Sullivan was given an A grade of 75 from the Cato Institute, ahead of every other state governor and only behind Massachusetts Governor Bill Weld's score of 85, due to his handling of Wyoming's energy industry growth.

=== Foreign policy ===
On March 8, 1986, Sullivan gave the keynote address at the Natrona County Democratic convention. During his speech he criticized the Reagan administration as it "waffled and rationalized" over allegations of fraud committed by President Ferdinand Marcos during the 1986 Philippine presidential election. He also criticized the administration for its support of military aid to the Contras during the Nicaraguan Revolution. In October, he stated that he would accept the removal of missiles from Wyoming as a part of an arms agreement with the Soviet Union as "if we can secure world peace, we can't be concerned about what effect it may have on our short-term economic development prospects." He signed a legislative resolution supporting Operation Desert Storm.

=== Government ===
During the reapportionment process before the 1992 Wyoming Senate election, Sullivan supported the creation of single-member districts, but the state legislature approved legislation which reduced the state house from 64 members to 62 members, created 16 single-member and 23 two-member House districts, and had the entirety of the state senate elected from single-member districts. On February 17, 1992, Sullivan vetoed the legislation. On February 18, the state legislature failed to overturn his veto with all 42 Republican members of the House and Senate voting to override and all 22 Democratic members voting against, causing the attempted overturning to fall one vote short. Sullivan signed a new redistricting plan on February 21, which had all thirty members of the state senate elected from single-member districts and reduced the state house from sixty-four to sixty members all elected from single-member districts.

During Sullivan's state-of-the-state speech in January 1987, he supported the idea of reorganizing the Department of Health and Social Service into four different departments, but when the legislation was introduced by Senator Win Hickey it died in committee. He and fellow governors Clifford Hansen, Stanley K. Hathaway, and Jim Geringer opposed ballot proposals during the 1996 election that would institute term limits in the state legislature.

=== Social ===
Sullivan is opposed to abortion. In 1977, the Natrona County Memorial Hospital board voted two to two, with Sullivan against, on whether to allow non-therapeutic abortions in the hospital. Bill Muller broke the tie by voting to allow non-therapeutic abortions. Brown stated that Sullivan was against a constitutional amendment prohibiting abortions and that he would not support legislation that would prevent abortions. The National Organization for Women rated him as anti-choice during the 1990 election. During the 1994 elections he opposed a ballot initiative that would ban abortion in Wyoming, except to save the mother's life or in the cases of rape or incest, and would punish physicians who perform abortions with up to fourteen years in prison.

On September 16, 1986, Sullivan stated that he would not require general drug testing of state employees. He opposed legislation that would prohibit children with AIDS from attending school and said that experts should make decisions about individual cases. In 1987, he vetoed legislation which would have repealed a 1985 law requiring rubella tests and Rh factor tests for marriage licenses. Alan Simpson, Sullivan, Thomas, and Wallop questioned the effects of asbestos with Sullivan also stating that the cost of removing asbestos from schools would be expensive.

Sullivan supports capital punishment although he stated that he would not oppose an attempt to end executions by the state legislature. In 1992, he stated that he would not grant clemency to convicted murderer Mark Hopkinson despite the American Civil Liberties Union, Wyoming Public Defender Leonard Munker, Gerry Spence, who led the prosecution against Hopkinson, and Marjorie Coggeshall, a relative of the murder victims, asking for clemency. He stated that he would talk to Mother Teresa about the execution, but only if she started the discussion. Hopkinson was executed on January 22, 1992, becoming the first person executed in Wyoming since 1965, and the only person executed in Wyoming after Furman v. Georgia.

The Natrona County Memorial Hospital board voted four to zero, with Sullivan voting in favor, to prohibit the sale of tobacco in the hospital in 1977. He supported and signed legislation raising the drinking age in Wyoming from nineteen to twenty-one, making Wyoming the last state to raise its drinking age to twenty-one. He stated that legislation by House Minority Leader H. L. Jensen to lower the drinking age from twenty-one to nineteen was "the silliest thing I've heard in a long time". He opposed the legalization of gambling.

Sullivan supported legislation creating a holiday in honor of Martin Luther King Jr. while opposing attempts to name the holiday Wyoming's Day of Equal Rights. He stated that it was "profound embarrassment to our state" when the legislation failed to pass. He signed an executive order in 1989, declaring that Martin Luther King Jr. Equality Day would be on January 15, 1990. Wyoming was the forty-seventh state to recognize a holiday in honor of King.

=== Taxation ===
Sullivan criticized the Gramm–Rudman–Hollings Balanced Budget Act for "cutting and carving without recognition of needs and the merits of programs". Brown stated that Sullivan would not support increasing taxes. In 1987, the Wyoming Legislature voted in favor of decreasing the coal tax which would decrease revenue by up to $15 million by the 1990s. Sullivan opposed the legislation and wrote a letter to legislators voicing his opposition. He proposed increasing taxation on alcohol, from 2¢ to 20¢ per gallon, and cigarettes, from 8¢ to 28¢ per pack, in 1987.

Wyoming Senate Democratic Minority Whip John Fanos criticized Sullivan in 1992 for not having the leadership abilities to stop budget cuts and encourage tax increases. On March 15, 1994, Sullivan signed the 1995–1996 budget into law, but used his line-item veto against thirteen parts of the legislation. However, the state House and Senate voted to overturn his vetoes with all Republican members voting in favor of overriding and all Democratic members voting against.

Sullivan and Wyoming's congressional delegation wrote in The Washington Post to criticize Citizens for Tax Justice's report stating that Wyoming was among the ten states with the worst tax structure.

== Electoral history ==
1986 Wyoming gubernatorial election
Primary election
Party	Candidate	Votes	%
Democratic	Mike Sullivan	29,266	70.92%
Democratic	Pat McGuire	5,406	13.10%
Democratic	Keith Goodenough	4,039	9.79%
Democratic	Al Hamburg	2,554	6.19%
Total votes		41,265	100.00%
General election
Democratic	Mike Sullivan	88,879	53.96%
Republican	Pete Simpson	75,841	46.04%
Total votes		164,720	100.00%
Democratic hold			

1990 Wyoming gubernatorial election
Primary election
Party	Candidate	Votes	%
Democratic	Mike Sullivan (incumbent)	38,447	88.44%
Democratic	Ron Clingman	5,026	11.56%
Total votes		43,473	100.00%
General election
Democratic	Mike Sullivan (incumbent)	104,638	65.35%
Republican	Mary Mead	55,471	34.65%
Total votes		160,109	100.00%
Democratic hold			

1994 Wyoming United States Senate Democratic primary
Party	Candidate	Votes	%
Democratic	Mike Sullivan	39,563	100.00%
Total votes		39,563	100.00%

1994 Wyoming United States Senate election
Party	Candidate	Votes	%	±%
Republican	Craig L. Thomas	118,754	58.87%	+8.50%
Democratic	Mike Sullivan	79,287	39.31%	−10.33%
Libertarian	Craig Alan McClune	3,669	1.82%	+1.82%
Total votes		201,710	100.00%	
Republican hold				

== General references ==
- Roberts, Phillip (2009). Wyoming Blue Book. Cheyenne, Wyoming: Wyoming State Archives. ISBN 9780978982928.

Party political offices
Preceded by Edgar Herschler	Democratic nominee for Governor of Wyoming; 1986, 1990	Succeeded by Kathy Karpan
Preceded by John Vinich	Democratic nominee for U.S. Senator from Wyoming (Class 1); 1994	Succeeded by Mel Logan
Political offices
Preceded by Edgar Herschler	Governor of Wyoming; 1987–1995	Succeeded by Jim Geringer
Diplomatic posts
Preceded by Jean Kennedy Smith	United States Ambassador to Ireland; 1998–2001	Succeeded by Richard Egan
U.S. order of precedence (ceremonial)
Preceded by Martha McSally as Former U.S. Senator	Order of precedence of the United States; Within Wyoming	Succeeded by Jim Geringer as Former Governor
Preceded by Butch Otter as Former Governor	Order of precedence of the United States; Outside Wyoming	Succeeded by Jim Geringer as Former Governor
