= 1990 Wyoming gubernatorial election =

- November 6, 1990
- Turnout: 71.99% Registered ▲2.00% 35.30% of Total Population ▲0.22%
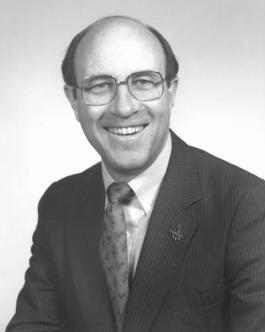

Nominee	Mike Sullivan	Mary Mead
Party	Democratic	Republican
Popular vote	104,638	55,471
Percentage	65.35%	34.65%
- County results Sullivan: 50–60% 60–70% 70–80% Mead: 50–60%
Governor before election
Mike Sullivan
Democratic
Elected Governor
Mike Sullivan
Democratic

The 1990 Wyoming gubernatorial election took place on November 6, 1990. Incumbent Democratic Governor Mike Sullivan ran for re-election. In the general election, he faced Republican nominee Mary Mead, a businesswoman and the daughter of former U.S. Senator and Governor Clifford Hansen. Owing to Sullivan's personal popularity, he won re-election over Mead in a landslide, marking the fifth straight Democratic victory in Wyoming's gubernatorial races, a streak that has yet to be broken by either party.

== Democratic primary ==
=== Candidates ===
- Mike Sullivan, incumbent Governor
- Ron Clingman, mechanic

Sullivan's campaign was managed by Rich Lindsey.

=== Results ===
Democratic primary results
Party	Candidate	Votes	%
Democratic	Mike Sullivan (inc.)	38,447	88.44%
Democratic	Ron Clingman	5,026	11.56%
Total votes		43,473	100.00%

== Republican ==
=== Candidates ===
Won

- Mary Mead, businesswoman and daughter of former Governor Clifford Hansen

Lost

- Nyla Murphy, State Representative

Withdrew

- Hugh Duncan, Stanley K. Hathaway's campaign manager in 1966 and 1970 and adviser to Pete Simpson in 1986
- Mike Lindsey, newspaper publisher

Declined

- Kelly Mader, member of the Wyoming Senate (1985–1991)
- Carroll Miller, member of the Wyoming House of Representatives
- John R. Perry, member of the Wyoming Senate
- Charles Scott, member of the Wyoming Senate (1983–present)
- Diemer True, member of the Wyoming Senate (1977–1993)

Speculated

- Bill Budd, member of the Wyoming legislature and candidate in 1986 gubernatorial election
- Doug Chamberlain, member of the Wyoming House of Representatives
- Russ Donley, Speaker of the Wyoming House of Representatives (1983–1984)
- Boyd L. Eddins, member of the Wyoming Senate
- James Hageman, member of the Wyoming House of Representatives (1983–2006)
- Eddie D. Moore, member of the Wyoming Senate (1975–1986)
- Jack Sidi, 16th Wyoming State Auditor (1987–1991)

The central committee of the Wyoming Republican Party interviewed Hugh Duncan, Jack Sidi, Charles Scott, and Carroll Miller and scored them as possible gubernatorial nominees. Duncan received a rating of 83%, Sidi received 79%, Scott received 66%, and Miller received 23%. Duncan withdrew from the election on March 2, 1990, stating that he was unable to convince people of the differences between him and Sullivan.

Tom Thorson, a Republican committeeman from Natrona County, announced Mary Mead's candidacy at the Natrona County Republican Convention on March 6, as Mead was unable to attend due to snow. Mead formally announced her campaign on March 9, after Duncan and Mike Lindsey both dropped out and announced their support of her. Stanley K. Hathaway, a former governor, served as her campaign manager. Cynthia Lummis later served as her campaign manager. Nyla Murphy, a member of the state house who lost her committee leadership positions due to policy disagreement with Republican leaders, announced that she would run for one of five statewide offices in Wyoming. She launched her gubernatorial campaign on June 8, with Charles Huff and Linda Burkhart as her campaign managers. Mead spent over $280,000 during the primary, twenty times greater than Murphy's expenditure of $7,200.

=== Endorsements ===
Mary Mead

State legislators

- Carroll Miller, member of the Wyoming House of Representatives

Notable individuals

- Hugh Duncan, gubernatorial candidate
- Mike Lindsey, newspaper publisher

=== Results ===
Republican primary results
Party	Candidate	Votes	%
Republican	Mary Mead	51,560	67.25%
Republican	Nyla Murphy	24,916	32.75%
Total votes		76,476	100

== General election ==
Sullivan recorded a message for a test of Wyoming's Emergency Broadcast System, but it was replaced as some radio stations would not air it due to the equal-time rule. The National Organization for Women declined to endorse either of the candidates and instead supported a write-in candidacy for Murphy. Mead and Sullivan participated in a debate hosted by KTWO-TV on October 23, 1990, and KTWO-TV stated that Mead violated the rules by using notes.

Mark Hughes, the chair of the Wyoming Republican Party, criticized Mead as being unprepared after she lost the election, but also criticized the media for giving Sullivan front-page coverage while "Mead was on the B-section". Hughes later apologized for criticizing Mead. He did not seek reelection as chair, but stated that he made that decision months before his criticism of Mead.

Mead received $158,798 and Sullivan received $154,562 from individual contributions. Mead paid $183,104 to consultant Sandler-Innocenzi and $12,441 to Tony Payton, accounting for around half of her expenditure. Sullivan received almost $57,900 from political action committees compared to $21,600 for Mead. The Republican Party of Wyoming contributed $43,200 to Mead while the Democratic Party of Wyoming contributed $8,763 to Sullivan. Mead received $157,000 in loans from her father and brother while Sullivan borrowed nothing. During the campaign Sullivan raised $225,681 and spent $196,733 for an ending surplus of $28,948. Mead raised $395,532 and spent $416,313 for an ending deficit of $20.

=== Polling ===
Poll source	Date(s) administered	Sample size	Margin of error	Michael Sullivan Democratic	Mary Mead Republican	Undecided
Tarrance and Associates (Republican internal)	September 14–16, 1990	500	±4.5%	53%	37%	10%

=== Results ===
1990 Wyoming gubernatorial election
Party	Candidate	Votes	%	±%
Democratic	Mike Sullivan (inc.)	104,638	65.35%	+11.40%
Republican	Mary Mead	55,471	34.65%	−11.40%
Majority		49,167	30.71%	+22.79%
Turnout		160,109		
Democratic hold				

=== Endorsements ===
Mary Mead

Statewide officials

- Thyra Thomson, 16th Secretary of State of Wyoming (1963–1987)
Mike Sullivan

Statewide officials

- Wyoming Education Association
