= Edward Moore =

Ed, Eddie or Edward Moore may refer to:

== Literature ==
- Edward Moore (critic) (1877–1935), American music critic, writer on music, songwriter, and composer
- Edward Moore (dramatist) (1712–1757), English playwright, poet and editor
- Edward Moore, pen name of Edwin Muir (1887–1959), Scottish poet, novelist and translator

== Politics ==
- Edward Moore, 5th Earl of Drogheda (1701–1758), Anglo-Irish peer and politician
- Sir Edward Moore, 1st Baronet (1851-1923), English politician, Lord Mayor of London
- Edward E. Moore (1866/67–1940), American politician in Indiana and California
- Edward H. Moore (1871–1950), American politician from Oklahoma
- Eddie D. Moore (1926–2011), member of the Wyoming Senate

== Religion ==
- Edward Moore (Archdeacon of Emly) (1714–1788), Irish Anglican priest
- Edward Moore (canon of Windsor) (1798–1876), English Anglican priest
- Edward Moore (Archdeacon of Oakham) (1844–1921), English Anglican priest
- Edward Caldwell Moore (1857–1943), American Presbyterian pastor and theologian
- Edward Moore (bishop of Travancore and Cochin) (1870–1944), English Anglican bishop
- Edward R. Moore (1894–1952), American Catholic priest, professor, social worker and author
- Edward Moore (bishop of Kilmore, Elphin and Ardagh) (1906–1997), Irish Anglican bishop

== Sports ==
- Edward Moore (rower) (1897–1968), American gold medalist Olympian in 1920
- Edward Moore (Irish cricketer) (1970–2021), left-arm pace bowler during 1990s
- Edward Moore (South African cricketer) (born 1993), left-handed batsman
- Eddie Moore (baseball) (1899–1976), American infielder and outfielder
- Eddie Moore (American football) (born 1980), linebacker for Miami Dolphins
- Ed Moore, American drag racer in 1987 NHRA Winternationals
- Ed Moore, Canadian curler who has played alongside Rene Comeau in 2020–21

== Other ==
- Edward Mott Moore (1814–1902), American surgeon and medical lecturer
- Edward Chandler Moore (1827–1891), American silversmith and art collector
- Edward Moore (scholar) (1838–1916), English educator and writer about Dante
- Edward F. Moore (1925–2003), American professor of mathematics and computer science
- Edward Nathaniel Moore (1926–1998), Ghanaian commissioner for justice and attorney general

== See also ==
- Edward Moor (1771–1848), British soldier for East India Company and author
- Edward More (disambiguation)
- Edwin Moore (disambiguation)
