= Truax (surname) =

Truax is a surname. Notable people with the surname include:

- Barry Truax (born 1947), Canadian composer
- Billy Truax (1943–2026), American football player
- Bob Truax, co-founder of Zubaz, an American clothing company
- Brad Truax, American bass player for Interpol (band)
- Caleb Truax (born 1983), American boxer
- Carol Truax (1899–1986), American music administrator and cookbook author
- Charles V. Truax (1887–1935), American politician from Ohio
- Dalton Truax (1935–2019), American football player
- Fred Truax (1868–1899), American baseball player
- Jay Truax, American bass player and singer
- John Truax (1877–1930), American politician
- Nettie Truax (fl. 1913–1915), American politician
- Peter Truax (1828–1909), American entrepreneur and politician
- Reuben Eldridge Truax (1847–1935), Canadian businessman and politician
- Rhoda Truax (1901–2000), American author
- Robert Truax (1918–2010), American rocket engineer
- Sarah Truax (1872–1958), American stage actor
- Terry Truax (1945–2015), American basketball coach
- Thomas Truax, American composer, performer and inventor

== See also ==
- Truex
