= Truax =

Truax may refer to:

== Books ==
- Truax, a logging friendly rewrite by Terri Birkett of Dr. Seuss' Lorax

== People and fictional characters ==
- Truax (surname)
- Ariel Truax, a main character in the film Grumpy Old Men

== Places ==
- Truax, Saskatchewan, Canada, an unincorporated community
- Truax, Wisconsin, United States, an unincorporated community

== Airports in the United States ==
- Dane County Regional Airport, near Madison, Wisconsin, also known as Truax Field, a civilian-military airport
  - Truax Field Air National Guard Base, also known as Truax Field
- Naval Air Station Corpus Christi, Texas, also known as Truax Field

== See also ==
- Truex
