= John R. Perry =

John R. Perry may refer to:

- John R. Perry (admiral) (1899 – 1955), admiral of the United States Navy
- John R. Perry (orientalist) (born 1942), American linguist
- John Richard Perry (born 1943), American philosopher
- John R. Perry (judge) (born 1955), American judge
