= Riverton, Wyoming =

Riverton, Wyoming Hooxono'o (Arapaho)
- City
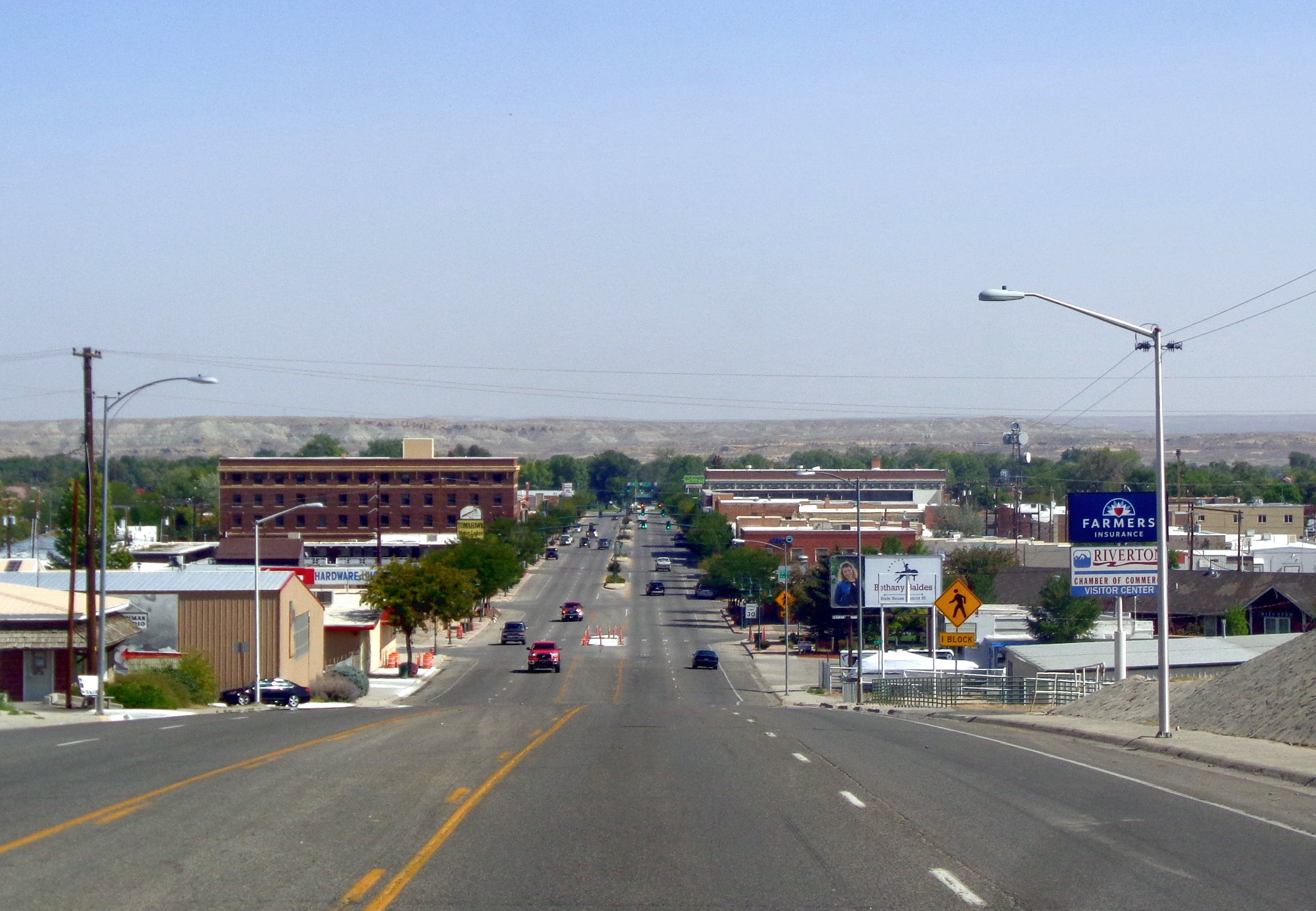
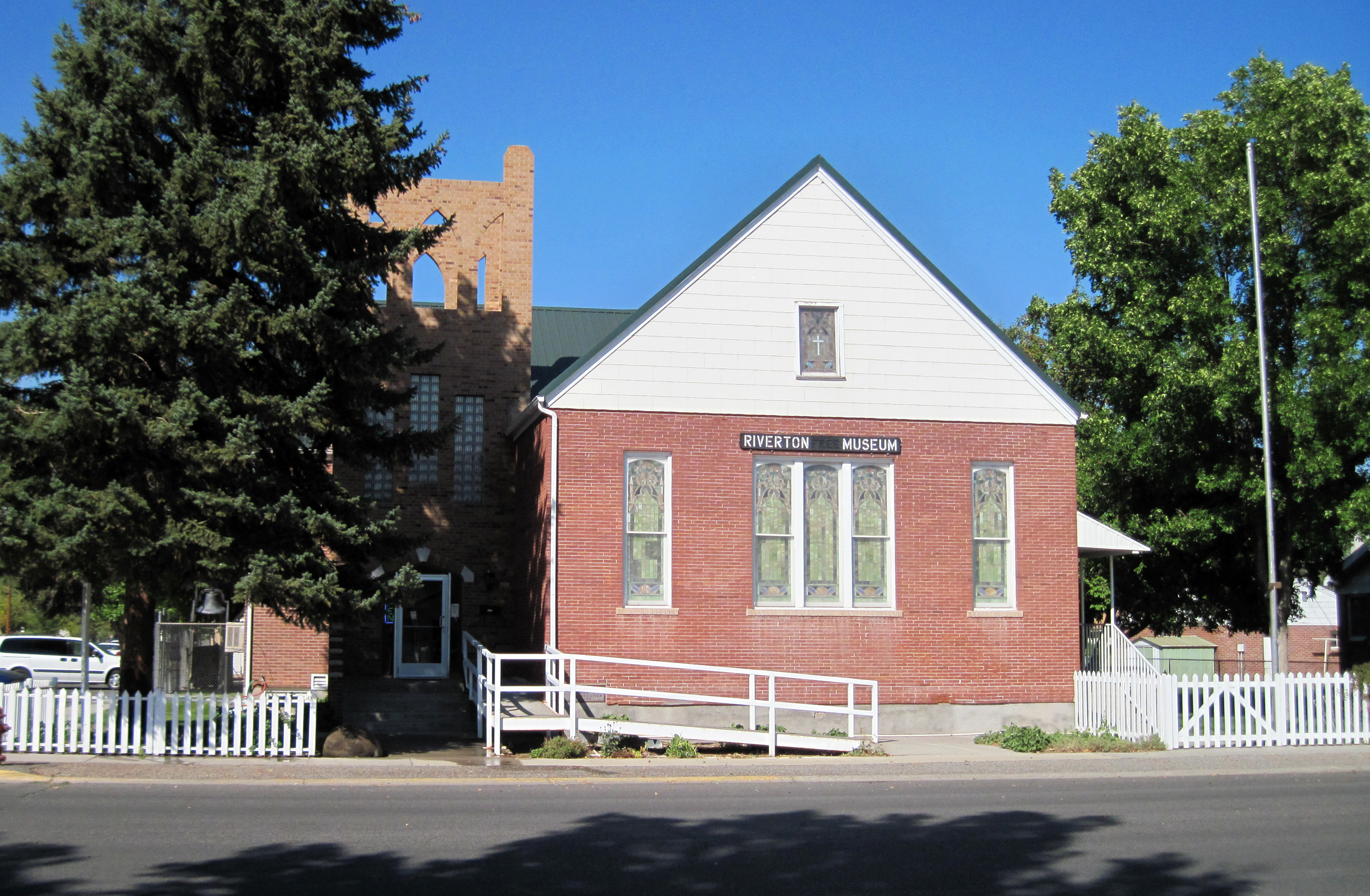
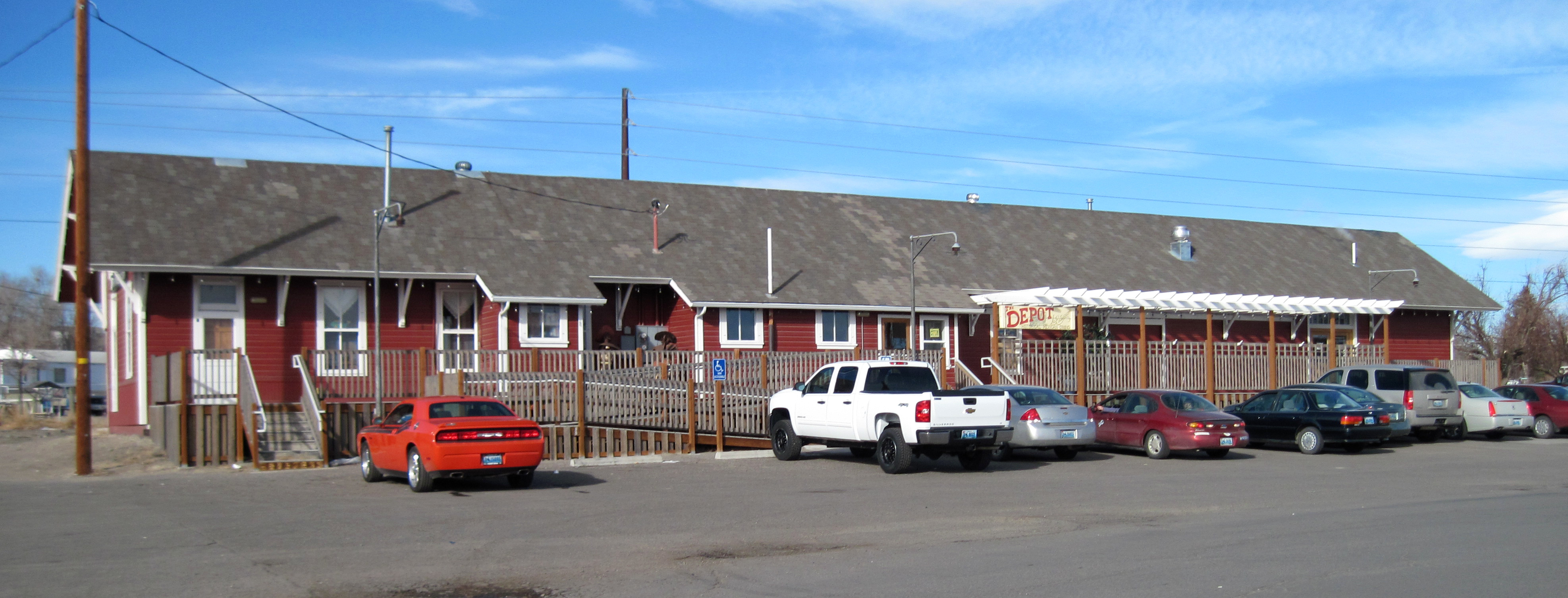
- Downtown Riverton Riverton Museum Central Wyoming College Riverton Railroad Depot
- Motto: "The Rendezvous City"
- Location of Riverton in Fremont County, Wyoming
- Coordinates: 43°01′38″N 108°23′30″W
- Country: United States
- State: Wyoming
- County: Fremont

Area
  - Total: 10.34 sq mi (26.78 km^{2})
  - Land: 10.34 sq mi (26.77 km^{2})
  - Water: 0.0039 sq mi (0.01 km^{2})
- Elevation: 4,951 ft (1,509 m)

Population (2020)
  - Total: 10,682
  - Density: 1,042.3/sq mi (402.42/km^{2})
- Time zone: UTC−7 (Mountain (MST))
  - Summer (DST): UTC−6 (MDT)
- ZIP Code: 82501
- Area code: 307
- FIPS code: 56-66220
- GNIS feature ID: 2410968
- Website: www.rivertonwy.gov

Riverton is a city in Fremont County, Wyoming, United States. The city's population was 10,682 at the 2020 census, making it the most populous city in the county.

== History ==
The city, founded in 1906, is an incorporated entity of the state of Wyoming. The community was named Riverton because of the four rivers that meet there. The town was built on land ceded from the Wind River Indian Reservation, a situation that often makes it subject to jurisdictional claims by the nearby Eastern Shoshone and Northern Arapaho tribes.

A legal ruling on November 7, 2017, by the 10th Circuit Court, ruled again in the EPA reservation boundary dispute. Though the decision was complex, the 10th Circuit Court answered plainly. Riverton is not on the reservation. The 10th Circuit's decision is now official and final after the 10th Circuit Court of Appeals 2017 ruling. The Tenth Circuit Court of Appeals reversed the decision of the EPA, and held that the land had been ceded in 1905 by an Act of Congress. This ruling ends the dispute, bringing the debate and controversy to an end.

Riverton Regional Airport (now Central Wyoming Regional Airport) is home to a National Weather Service Forecast Office and NEXRAD radar site which is responsible to cover all of western and central Wyoming.

The Chicago & Northwestern Railway completed an extension of the "Cowboy Line" through to Lander which is roughly 22 miles west of Riverton. Plans were to continue the line west from Lander. In 1972, the end of the line was moved from Lander and the new terminus of the line was in Riverton. Services were then discontinued in Riverton in the mid-1970's as the line was slowly dismantled west of Casper.

== Geography ==
Riverton is located directly north of the Wind River. U.S. Route 26 and Wyoming Highway 789 pass through the city.

According to the United States Census Bureau, the city has a total area of 9.87 square miles (25.56 km^{2}), of which 9.86 square miles (25.54 km^{2}) is land and 0.01 square miles (0.03 km^{2}) is water.

=== Climate ===
According to the Köppen Climate Classification system, Riverton has a cold semi-arid climate, abbreviated "BSk" on climate maps. The hottest temperature recorded in Riverton was 106 °F (41 °C) on July 13, 2026, while the coldest temperature recorded was −46 °F (−43 °C) on January 17, 1930, January 12, 1963, December 31, 1978, January 1, 1979, and December 23, 1983.

Climate data for Riverton, Wyoming, 1991–2020 normals, extremes 1907–present
Month	Jan	Feb	Mar	Apr	May	Jun	Jul	Aug	Sep	Oct	Nov	Dec	Year
Record high °F (°C)	63 (17)	71 (22)	84 (29)	87 (31)	96 (36)	102 (39)	106 (41)	103 (39)	98 (37)	90 (32)	73 (23)	65 (18)	106 (41)
Mean maximum °F (°C)	49.9 (9.9)	55.5 (13.1)	68.7 (20.4)	78.5 (25.8)	86.0 (30.0)	93.6 (34.2)	98.8 (37.1)	96.5 (35.8)	91.2 (32.9)	79.9 (26.6)	64.5 (18.1)	53.1 (11.7)	99.1 (37.3)
Mean daily maximum °F (°C)	28.7 (−1.8)	35.5 (1.9)	49.2 (9.6)	58.0 (14.4)	67.4 (19.7)	78.9 (26.1)	87.9 (31.1)	85.7 (29.8)	74.4 (23.6)	59.2 (15.1)	42.7 (5.9)	29.6 (−1.3)	58.1 (14.5)
Daily mean °F (°C)	16.4 (−8.7)	22.5 (−5.3)	35.7 (2.1)	44.2 (6.8)	53.8 (12.1)	63.7 (17.6)	71.3 (21.8)	69.0 (20.6)	58.4 (14.7)	44.8 (7.1)	29.9 (−1.2)	17.6 (−8.0)	43.9 (6.6)
Mean daily minimum °F (°C)	4.2 (−15.4)	9.6 (−12.4)	22.2 (−5.4)	30.5 (−0.8)	40.3 (4.6)	48.5 (9.2)	54.8 (12.7)	52.2 (11.2)	42.5 (5.8)	30.4 (−0.9)	17.1 (−8.3)	5.7 (−14.6)	29.8 (−1.2)
Mean minimum °F (°C)	−16.8 (−27.1)	−13.3 (−25.2)	2.8 (−16.2)	16.4 (−8.7)	26.7 (−2.9)	36.7 (2.6)	45.7 (7.6)	41.9 (5.5)	29.3 (−1.5)	13.4 (−10.3)	−2.8 (−19.3)	−14.0 (−25.6)	−22.4 (−30.2)
Record low °F (°C)	−46 (−43)	−45 (−43)	−24 (−31)	−18 (−28)	15 (−9)	26 (−3)	30 (−1)	29 (−2)	9 (−13)	−13 (−25)	−28 (−33)	−46 (−43)	−46 (−43)
Average precipitation inches (mm)	0.35 (8.9)	0.43 (11)	0.71 (18)	1.31 (33)	1.98 (50)	1.09 (28)	0.70 (18)	0.45 (11)	0.80 (20)	0.93 (24)	0.44 (11)	0.31 (7.9)	9.50 (241)
Average snowfall inches (cm)	5.5 (14)	7.4 (19)	6.5 (17)	7.2 (18)	2.1 (5.3)	0.0 (0.0)	0.0 (0.0)	0.0 (0.0)	0.6 (1.5)	4.4 (11)	5.3 (13)	5.3 (13)	44.3 (111.8)
Average precipitation days (≥ 0.01 in)	3.7	4.2	4.6	6.7	8.8	5.8	4.5	4.6	5.2	5.0	3.8	4.1	61.0
Average snowy days (≥ 0.1 in)	4.2	4.9	3.8	3.4	1.3	0.0	0.0	0.0	0.3	2.0	3.6	4.6	28.1
Source 1: NOAA
Source 2: National Weather Service

== Demographics ==
Historical population
Census	Pop.	Note	%±
1910	483		—
1920	2,023		318.8%
1930	1,608		−20.5%
1940	2,540		58.0%
1950	4,142		63.1%
1960	6,845		65.3%
1970	7,995		16.8%
1980	9,562		19.6%
1990	9,202		−3.8%
2000	9,310		1.2%
2010	10,615		14.0%
2020	10,682		0.6%
Population 2020 and Historical

=== 2020 census ===
As of the 2020 census, Riverton had a population of 10,682. The median age was 37.6 years. 23.9% of residents were under the age of 18 and 19.3% of residents were 65 years of age or older. For every 100 females there were 103.9 males, and for every 100 females age 18 and over there were 101.0 males age 18 and over.

95.4% of residents lived in urban areas, while 4.6% lived in rural areas.

There were 4,233 households in Riverton, of which 30.4% had children under the age of 18 living in them. Of all households, 40.0% were married-couple households, 20.8% were households with a male householder and no spouse or partner present, and 31.5% were households with a female householder and no spouse or partner present. About 34.5% of all households were made up of individuals and 16.1% had someone living alone who was 65 years of age or older.

There were 4,675 housing units, of which 9.5% were vacant. The homeowner vacancy rate was 2.3% and the rental vacancy rate was 7.5%.

Racial composition as of the 2020 census
Race	Number	Percent
White	7,836	73.4%
Black or African American	100	0.9%
American Indian and Alaska Native	1,521	14.2%
Asian	63	0.6%
Native Hawaiian and Other Pacific Islander	8	0.1%
Some other race	323	3.0%
Two or more races	831	7.8%
Hispanic or Latino (of any race)	1,053	9.9%

=== 2010 census ===
As of the census of 2010, there were 10,615 people, 4,252 households, and 2,600 families living in the city. The population density was 1,076.6 inhabitants per square mile (415.7/km^{2}). There were 4,567 housing units at an average density of 463.2 per square mile (178.8/km^{2}). The racial makeup of the city was 83.5% White, 0.5% African American, 10.4% Native American, 0.3% Asian, 0.1% Pacific Islander, 1.8% from other races, and 3.5% from two or more races. Hispanic or Latino of any race were 9.0% of the population.

There were 4,252 households, of which 31.0% had children under the age of 18 living with them, 43.2% were married couples living together, 12.9% had a female householder with no husband present, 5.1% had a male householder with no wife present, and 38.9% were non-families. 31.3% of all households were made up of individuals, and 13.6% had someone living alone who was 65 years of age or older. The average household size was 2.37 and the average family size was 2.96.

The median age in the city was 35.4 years. 23.9% of residents were under the age of 18; 11.5% were between the ages of 18 and 24; 25% were from 25 to 44; 24.3% were from 45 to 64; and 15.2% were 65 years of age or older. The gender makeup of the city was 50.0% male and 50.0% female.

=== 2000 census ===
As of the census of 2000, there were 9,311 people, 3,816 households, and 2,407 families living in the city. The population density was 952.2 people per square mile (367.5/km^{2}). There were 4,254 housing units at an average density of 435.1/sq mi (167.9/km^{2}). The racial makeup of the city was 86.81% White, 0.17% African American, 8.08% Native American, 0.47% Asian, 0.03% Pacific Islander, 1.86% from other races, and 2.58% from two or more races. Hispanic or Latino of any race were 7.09% of the population.

There were 3,816 households, out of which 29.7% had children under the age of 18 living with them, 48.2% were married couples living together, 10.4% had a female householder with no husband present, and 36.9% were non-families. 31.6% of all households were made up of individuals, and 14.3% had someone living alone who was 65 years of age or older. The average household size was 2.33 and the average family size was 2.93.

In the city, the population was spread out, with 24.2% under the age of 18, 10.4% from 18 to 24, 26.0% from 25 to 44, 23.0% from 45 to 64, and 16.4% who were 65 years of age or older. The median age was 38 years. For every 100 females, there were 94.0 males. For every 100 females age 18 and over, there were 92.6 males.

The median income for a household in the city was $31,531, and the median income for a family was $37,079. Males had a median income of $31,685 versus $19,157 for females. The per capita income for the city was $16,720. About 11.0% of families and 15.7% of the population were below the poverty line, including 21.3% of those under age 18 and 11.5% of those age 65 or over.

== Economy ==
Brunton, Inc. is home to the manufacturer of the Brunton compass.

== Arts and culture ==
Riverton has a public library, a branch of the Fremont County Library System.

== Education ==
Public education in the city of Riverton is provided by Fremont County School District #25. The district operates three K–3 elementary schools (Ashgrove, Willow Creek, and Jackson), Rendezvous Elementary School (grades 4–5), Riverton Middle School (grades 6–8), and Riverton High School (grades 9–12).

Central Wyoming College is located in Riverton, with off-campus sites in Jackson, Lander, Thermopolis, Dubois, and the Wind River Indian Reservation.

The Northern Arapaho Language Immersion School had 20 students in 2009. It was created by Northern Arapaho tribe to preserve the language, with only English classes being English medium. It was meant to open in August 2008. It was inspired by immersion programs in Hawaii and New Zealand. Another school, Arapahoe School, received a federal grant intended to last for five years to have a bilingual program, though Arapaho instruction is more limited there.

== Infrastructure ==
=== Transportation ===
==== Transit ====
Wind River Transportation Authority provides transit service throughout Fremont County.

==== Airline service ====
A daily passenger service is available to Denver at Central Wyoming Regional Airport, with service provided by SkyWest Airlines operating as United Express. The airport also provides rental car services through Hertz as well as general aviation services.

==== Roadways ====
- United States Highway 26
- Wyoming State Highway 789

==== Rail ====
Riverton is located along the Chicago & North Western main line between Omaha and Lander, known as the Cowboy Line.

=== Emergency Services ===
Emergency services are provided by the Riverton Police Department, Riverton Volunteer Fire Department, Fremont County Fire Protection District Battalion 1, and Frontier Ambulance.

In December of 2024, Riverton Police Chief Eric Hurtado announced a nearly full staff consisting of 26 sworn officers. The Riverton Police Department has two remaining vacancies.

== Notable people ==
=== Astronauts ===
- John Bennett Herrington (born 1958), first enrolled member of a Native American tribe to fly in space

=== Athletics and Sports ===
- Nick Bebout (born 1951), NFL player
- Bud Daley, New York Yankees pitcher who was an MLB All-Star and World Series champion
- Lance Deal (born 1961), four-time Olympic hammer thrower (1988, 1992, 1996, 2000)
- Bucky Jacobsen (born 1975), former Major League Baseball first baseman for the Seattle Mariners
- Corte McGuffey (born 1977), former XFL New York/New Jersey Hitmen Quarterback and recipient of the 1999 Harlon Hill Trophy as the best player in NCAA Division II college football.
- Brett Newlin (born 1982), member of the 2008 and 2012 United States Olympic Rowing team
- Kristen Newlin (born 1985), international basketball player
- Willie Wright (born 1968), a former American professional football player who was a linebacker and tight end in the National Football League (NFL) and the World League of American Football (WLAF).

=== Film and Television ===
- Chance Phelps (1984–2004), subject of an HBO movie, Taking Chance
- Darrell Winfield (1929–2015), "Marlboro Man"
- Ashlynn Yennie, actress who starred in the popular film “The Human Centipede”

=== Government and Politics ===
- Leslie Lynch King Sr. (1884–1941), lived for a time as an adult in Riverton, was the biological father of Gerald Ford
- Andi LeBeau, elected as a Democrat to the Wyoming House of Representatives in 2018
- David Love (1913–2002), geologist who was born on a ranch near Riverton
- Nyla Murphy (1931–2015), served as a Republican member of the Wyoming House of Representatives and practiced law as an adult in Riverton
- Kristi Racines (c. 1983), the Wyoming State Auditor
