= Anna B. Miller =

American politician

Member of the Wyoming House of Representatives from the Albany County district
- In office 1913–1915 Serving with Leslie C. John, Joseph Sullivan
- Preceded by: Leslie A. Miller

Personal details
- Party: Democratic
- Children: 6, including Leslie A. Miller
- Occupation: Politician

Anna B. Miller was an American politician from Laramie, Wyoming, who served a single term in the Wyoming House of Representatives. She was elected in 1912, and represented Albany County from 1913 to 1915 (Note: According to the Wyoming Legislature, Miller only served in 1913.) as a Democrat in the 12th Wyoming Legislature. Miller represented Albany County alongside Leslie C. John and Joseph Sullivan.

Miller had six children. She was one of only two women serving in the Wyoming Legislature in 1913, the other being Nettie Truax.

One of Miller's children, Leslie A. Miller, preceded her as a representative from Albany County.

== See also ==
- Leslie A. Miller, Miller's son, who preceded her as a representative from Albany County
- Nettie Truax, American politician who also served in the Wyoming House of Representatives in the 12th Wyoming Legislature
- Mary Bellamy, American politician who represented the Albany County district in the preceding Wyoming Legislature
- Morna Wood, American politician who served in the Wyoming House of Representatives in the subsequent Wyoming Legislature

== Notes ==
Wyoming House of Representatives
Preceded by Leslie A. Miller	Member of the Wyoming House of Representatives from the Albany County district 1913–1915; Served alongside: Leslie C. John, Joseph Sullivan	Succeeded by —
