= Governor Sullivan =

Governor Sullivan may refer to:

- James Sullivan (governor) (1744–1808), 7th Governor of Massachusetts
- John Sullivan (general) (1740–1795), 3rd and 5th Governor of New Hampshire
- Mike Sullivan (Wyoming politician) (born 1939), 29th Governor of Wyoming
