= WRTA =

WRTA may refer to:

- WRTA (AM), a radio station (1240 AM) licensed to Altoona, Pennsylvania, United States
- Worcester Regional Transit Authority
- Western Reserve Transit Authority
- Wind River Transportation Authority
