= Extreme Football League =

Extreme Football League can mean:

- Xtreme Football League, a planned indoor football league for 1999 that would merge with af2 in 2000
- X League (women's football), a women's football league in the United States
- XFL (2001), a professional American football league in the United States that played for one season in 2001
- XFL (2020), the second incarnation of the XFL league that began play in 2020

== See also ==
- XFL (disambiguation)
- X League (disambiguation)
