= Central Wyoming Regional Airport =

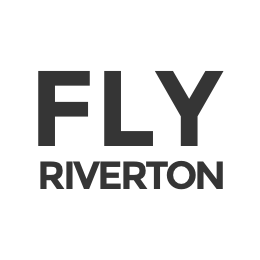
- IATA: RIW; ICAO: KRIW; FAA LID: RIW

Summary
- Airport type: Public
- Owner: City of Riverton
- Serves: Riverton, Wyoming
- Elevation AMSL: 5,528 ft (1,685 m)
- Coordinates: 43°03′51″N 108°27′35″W
- Website: http://flyriverton.com/

Map
- Location within Wyoming Location within the United States

Runways
Direction	Length		Surface
Direction	ft	m	Surface
10/28	8,204	2,501	Asphalt
1/19	4,800	1,463	Asphalt

Statistics (2018)
- Aircraft operations: 4,547
- Based aircraft: 37
- Source: Federal Aviation Administration

Central Wyoming Regional Airport, formerly Riverton Regional Airport, (IATA: RIW, ICAO: KRIW, FAA LID: RIW) is three miles northwest of Riverton, in Fremont County, Wyoming; it also serves nearby Lander, Wyoming. It is used for general aviation and sees one passenger airline. Service was subsidized by the Essential Air Service program until October 2006, when Great Lakes Airlines began providing subsidy-free service. Key Lime Air operating as the Denver Air Connection began serving the airport with regional jet aircraft on July 1, 2016.

Federal Aviation Administration records say the airport had 17,035 passenger boarding's (enplanements) in calendar year 2008, 14,186 in 2009 and 14,361 in 2010. The National Plan of Integrated Airport Systems for 2011–2015 categorized it as a primary commercial service airport (more than 10,000 enplanements per year).

== Facilities ==
The airport covers 1,250 acres (506 ha) at an elevation of 5,528 feet (1,685 m). It has two asphalt runways: 10/28 is 8,204 by 150 feet (2,501 x 46 m) and 1/19 is 4,800 by 75 feet (1,463 x 23 m). The airport is an uncontrolled airport with no control tower.

In 2018 the airport had 4,547 aircraft operations, average 12 per day: 78% general aviation, 22% air taxi, and <1% military. 37 aircraft were then based at this airport: 86% single-engine, 11% multi-engine, and 3% helicopter.

As of January 2025, the airport reported 2024 statistics of a record 21,704 departing passengers which was more than its previous reported high in 2008 of 16,847.

== History ==
=== Historic airline service ===
The original Frontier Airlines (1950-1986) served the airport for many years. In 1950 Frontier Douglas DC-3s flew to Denver, Salt Lake City, Billings, Casper, Cheyenne and other cities. By 1964 Frontier had introduced Convair 580s nonstop to Denver, Casper, Jackson, WY, and Rock Springs and direct to Salt Lake City, Albuquerque, Billings, Cheyenne, Laramie and Cody. Frontier Airlines predecessor Challenger Airlines served Riverton in the 1940s.

In 1979 Frontier Boeing 737-200s began serving the airport, along with Convair 580s. Frontier 737s flew direct to Denver via Casper; by 1985 Frontier had left the airport. Frontier was the only airline that flew mainline jets to the airport.

Frontier's service was replaced by Pioneer Airlines Swearingen Metroliners nonstop to Denver, code sharing flights as Continental Express for Continental Airlines. By 1989 Continental Express nonstops to Denver were Rocky Mountain Airways ATR 42s and Beechcraft 1900Cs. In 1995 the Continental Express code share service at the airport was being operated by GP Express Airlines with Beechcraft 1900Cs nonstop to Denver. By 1991 United Express (Mesa Airlines) had joined Continental Express at the airport with Beechcraft 1900Cs nonstop to Denver flown via a code sharing agreement with United Airlines. Continental shut down its hub in Denver and by 1999 only United Express (Great Lakes Airlines) served the airport, with nonstop Beechcraft 1900s to Denver. Great Lakes later lost its United Express designation but continued to serve the airport as an independent airline before dropping Riverton.

=== Recent developments ===
Great Lakes Airlines previously served the airport with Beechcraft 1900Ds. On November 1, 2016 Great Lakes introduced larger Embraer EMB-120 Brasilias on most of its flights to Denver. However, Great Lakes soon went out of business, ending service to Riverton.

SkyWest Airlines operating as United Express replaced Key Lime Air service to Denver on January 12, 2020 when they took over the subsidized air service contract for Riverton and Sheridan.

In 2020, the name changed from Riverton Regional Airport to Central Wyoming Regional Airport.

== Airline and destination ==
Airlines	Destinations
United Express	Denver

== Statistics ==
=== Top destinations ===
Busiest domestic routes from RIW by year
Year	Airport	Passengers	Carrier
Mar 2021 - Feb 2022	Denver, Colorado	16,000	United Express
Jan 2025 - Dec 2025	Denver, Colorado	25,775	United Express

== See also ==
- List of airports in Wyoming

== Other sources ==
- Essential Air Service documents (Docket OST-2003-14536) from the U.S. Department of Transportation:
  - Notice (February 17, 2003): of Great Lakes Aviation, Ltd. to terminate scheduled air service at Riverton, Wyoming. The effective date of this intended termination is May 17, 2003.
  - Order 2003-4-11 (April 15, 2003): prohibiting Great Lakes Aviation, Ltd. (Great Lakes), from suspending its unsubsidized service at Riverton, Wyoming and requesting proposals from carriers interested in providing replacement at the community.
  - Order 2004-7-16 (July 20, 2004): selects Great Lakes Aviation, Ltd., to provide essential air service with 19-passenger B1900D aircraft at Laramie, Riverton, Rock Springs, and Worland, Wyoming, for two years for annual subsidy rates of $397,400, $394,046, $390,488, and $797,844, respectively.
  - Order 2006-9-9 (September 11, 2006): re-selecting Great Lakes Aviation, Ltd., operating as both a United Airlines and Frontier code-share partner, to provide subsidized essential air service (EAS) at Laramie and Worland, Wyoming, at an annual subsidy rate of $487,516 for Laramie and $972,757 for Worland, for the two-year period of October 1, 2006, through September 30, 2008. On June 14, 2006, Great Lakes notified the Department that it will continue its existing service at Rock Springs but on a subsidy-free basis as of October 1, 2006, the beginning of the new rate-term. On July 24, 2006, Great Lakes notified the Department that it will also continue to provide its existing service at Riverton on a subsidy-free basis beginning October 1, 2006.
