= Joseph Sullivan (Wyoming politician) =

American politician

Member of the Wyoming House of Representatives
- In office 1913–1917

Personal details
- Born: June 20, 1880 O'Neill, Nebraska, U.S.
- Died: December 4, 1959 (aged 79) Laramie, Wyoming, U.S.
- Party: Democratic
- Spouse: Amy
- Children: 4
- Relatives: Mike Sullivan (grandson)
- Education: Creighton University

Joseph R. Sullivan (June 20, 1880 – December 4, 1959) was an American politician and lawyer who served in the Wyoming House of Representatives as a member of the Democratic Party.

== Early life ==
Joseph R. Sullivan was born on June 20, 1880, in O'Neill, Nebraska. He graduated from high school in O'Neill and later received a law degree from Creighton University in 1908. On November 29, 1909, he married Amy, with whom he had four children with, including John F. Sullivan who served in the Wyoming House of Representatives, and Patrick B. Sullivan, who fathered Governor Mike Sullivan.

== Career ==
=== Law ===
In 1910, he moved to Casper, Wyoming, where he practiced law before joining the staff of Wyoming's Attorney General in Cheyenne, Wyoming. In late 1910, he moved to Laramie, Wyoming, where he established a law practice. In 1935, he was selected to serve as president of the Wyoming State Bar Association.

=== Politics ===
From 1913 to 1917, Sullivan served in the Wyoming House of Representatives as a member of the Democratic Party. In 1942, Governor Lester C. Hunt offered the position of Wyoming Attorney General to Sullivan, who was then serving as chairman of the Albany County Democratic Party, but he declined the position.

== Later life ==
Sullivan served in the Albany Mutual Building Association, and on the board of trustees of the Ivension Memorial Hospital. From 1945 to his death, he served as a member of the University of Wyoming's board of trustees. On December 5, 1959, he died from a heart attack in a Laramie, Wyoming hospital.
