= Edward More =

Edward More may refer to:

- Edward More (churchman) (1479–1541), English churchman and educator
- Edward More (poet) (c. 1537–1620), English poet and grandson of Thomas More
- Edward More (MP) (c. 1555–1623), MP for Hampshire and Midhurst

== See also ==
- Edward Moore (disambiguation)
