= Mary Mead =

American politician

Personal details
- Born: Mary Elisabeth Hansen; June 21, 1935 Jackson, Wyoming, U.S.
- Died: June 21, 1996 (aged 61) Grand Teton National Park, Wyoming, U.S.
- Party: Republican
- Spouse(s): Peter Mead (Divorced); Dick Steinhour (1995–1996)
- Children: 3, including Matt
- Relatives: Clifford Hansen (Father)
- Education: University of Wyoming (BA)

Mary Elisabeth Hansen Mead (June 21, 1935 – June 21, 1996) was an American rancher, businesswoman, and a Republican politician in the U.S. state of Wyoming. She was the daughter of Governor and U.S. Senator Clifford Hansen and the mother of former Governor Matt Mead.

In 1990, Mead was the Republican nominee for governor, defeated in the general election by the incumbent Democrat Mike Sullivan of Douglas in Converse County in southeastern Wyoming. Sullivan prevailed with 104,638 votes (65.4 percent) to Mead's 55,471 ballots (34.6 percent). Mead polled only 4,311 more votes against Sullivan than she had received in her closed primary in August.

== Biography ==
Mary Mead was born in Jackson, Wyoming to Clifford Hansen (1912–2009) and Martha Close (1914–2011). She grew up on her family's ranch in Jackson Hole. She graduated from the University of Wyoming with a Bachelor of Arts in history and a minor in mathematics in 1957. She was a teacher in Pinedale from 1957 to 1958.

She married Peter Bradford Mead (1933–2015) the son of Janet Brainard (Ross) and Bradford Belcher Mead, who coincidentally partly bears the same name as her father, brother, and grandfather. For more than twenty years, she and Peter managed the family cattle ranch, originally homesteaded by her grandparents, Peter Christofferson Hansen and the former Sylvia Irene Wood. The Meads had three children. After their divorce, she ran the ranch with her parents and then with her older son, Bradford Scott Mead, and his wife, Katherine L. "Kate" Mead. In 1995, she married Dick Steinhour.

Mead was a president of the Wyoming Business Alliance and a member of the University of Wyoming Alumni Board, the Wyoming Centennial Commission, and the National Public Lands Advisory Council. She was active in both the Wyoming Stock Growers Association and the Wyoming Tax Payers Association. In Jackson, she sat on the boards of St. John's Hospital and the Jackson State Bank.

She lived on the Mead Ranch, officially the "Lower Bar BC", which prior to its sale – for more than $100 million – was one of the largest pastoral private holdings in Teton County. The Hansens and Meads were particularly known for conservation and stewardship activities on their properties.

By December 2001, the Lower Bar BC had become no longer economically productive and surrendered its 2,000-acre (8.1 km^{2}) lease in Grand Teton Park.

== Death and legacy ==
Considered an expert horsewoman, Mead was killed on her 61st birthday in an accident while working cattle on leased land in Grand Teton National Park near the Mead Ranch in Spring Gulch. She was thrown by her horse, which then collapsed upon her.

Mead's son Matt Mead has served as governor of Wyoming. Her other children are Bradford Scott "Brad" Mead (born July 24, 1957) and Muffy Mead-Ferro, an author in Salt Lake City, Utah. Brad Mead and his wife, Kate Mead (also born 1957), are attorneys in Jackson. Kate, a Vermont native who came to Wyoming on a skiing scholarship, was the Republican nominee in 2006 for the District 16 seat in the Wyoming House of Representatives. Both Bradford Mead and Clifford Hansen recorded interviews to be used as a part of the new Jackson Hole Historical Society Museum, to be unveiled in downtown Jackson.

Her children established the dual Mary Mead Memorial Scholarship and Graduate Fellowship for Women in Agriculture at the University of Wyoming. These awards honor her lifetime commitment to the Wyoming livestock industry.

The Mead children also released this eulogy to their mother:

One of Jackson's pre-eminent ranchers was "a woman born to the land that she knew every inch of -- every ditch, every bog, every dry patch, every likely place to look for an errant bunch of cows during spring gathering.
She was a diligent midwife to nearly one thousand mother cows every spring, she kept many an all-night vigil with a cow in difficulty or bottle-feeding a shivering newborn as she talked to it and rubbed it with a blanket on her kitchen floor.

Party political offices
Preceded by Pete Simpson	Republican nominee for Governor of Wyoming; 1990	Succeeded by Jim Geringer
