= Riverton station (Wyoming) =

- Riverton Railroad Depot
- U.S. National Register of Historic Places
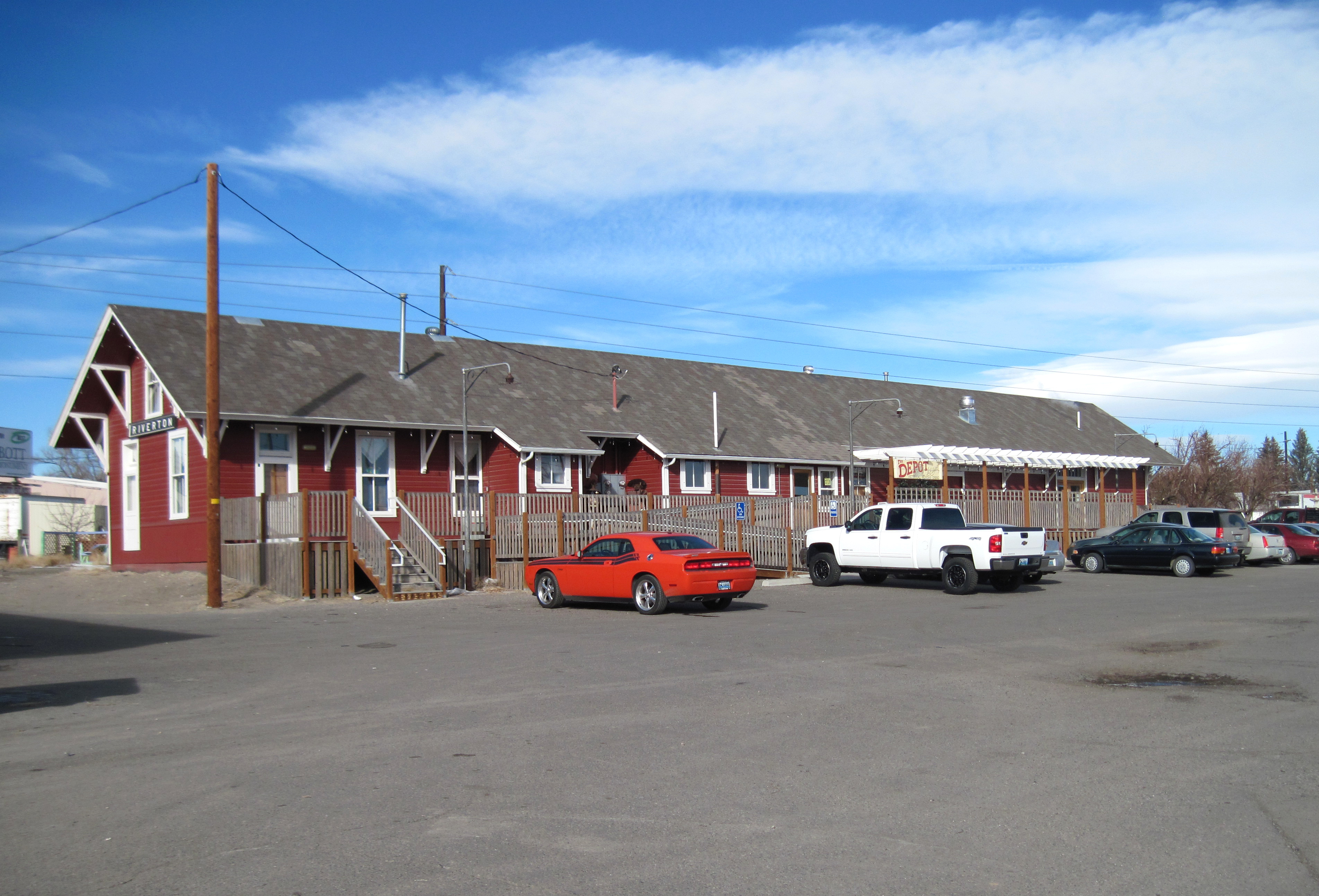

- Location within Wyoming Location within the United States
- Location: 1st and Main Sts., Riverton, Wyoming
- Coordinates: 43°1′28″N 108°23′24″W
- Area: less than one acre
- Built: 1906–1907
- Built by: Chicago & Northwestern Railroad
- NRHP reference No.: 78002827
- Added to NRHP: May 22, 1978

The Riverton Railroad Depot is a historic railway station located at 1st and Main Streets in Riverton, Wyoming. The depot was built by the Chicago and North Western Railway from 1906 to 1907 along a new line through central Wyoming built by the railway in 1906. The city of Riverton formed only two weeks before the railroad reached it when land in the area opened to new residents under the Homestead Act. The railroad spurred economic development in the region by exporting agricultural products and oil and creating demand for the local coal and lumber industries. When the railroad industry declined after World War II, the Chicago and North Western gradually decreased its service west of Casper, and by 1974 it was prepared to demolish the Riverton station as well. A group of Riverton residents instead bought and restored the depot, which now houses businesses. Some claim that the depot is the last surviving Chicago and North Western station west of Casper, but, although modified, the Lander station (the end of track for the C&NW's westward expansion), still stands and is currently home to the Lander Chamber of Commerce.

The depot was added to the National Register of Historic Places on May 22, 1978.

Preceding station	Chicago and North Western Railway	Following station
Arapahoe toward Lander	Fremont, Elkhorn and Missouri Valley Railroad; Main Line	Shoshoni toward Omaha
