= 1988 United States House of Representatives election in Wyoming =

- November 8, 1988
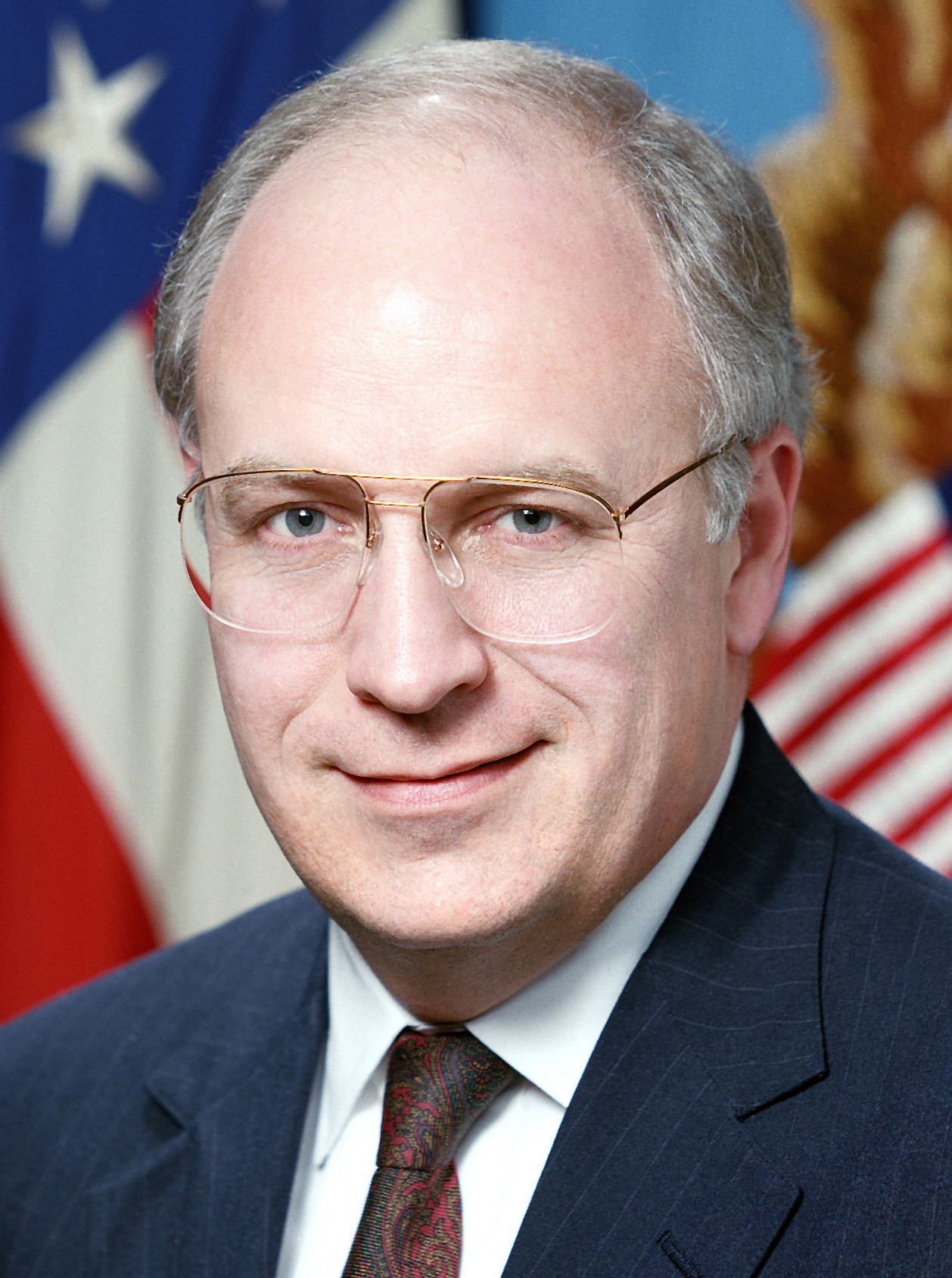

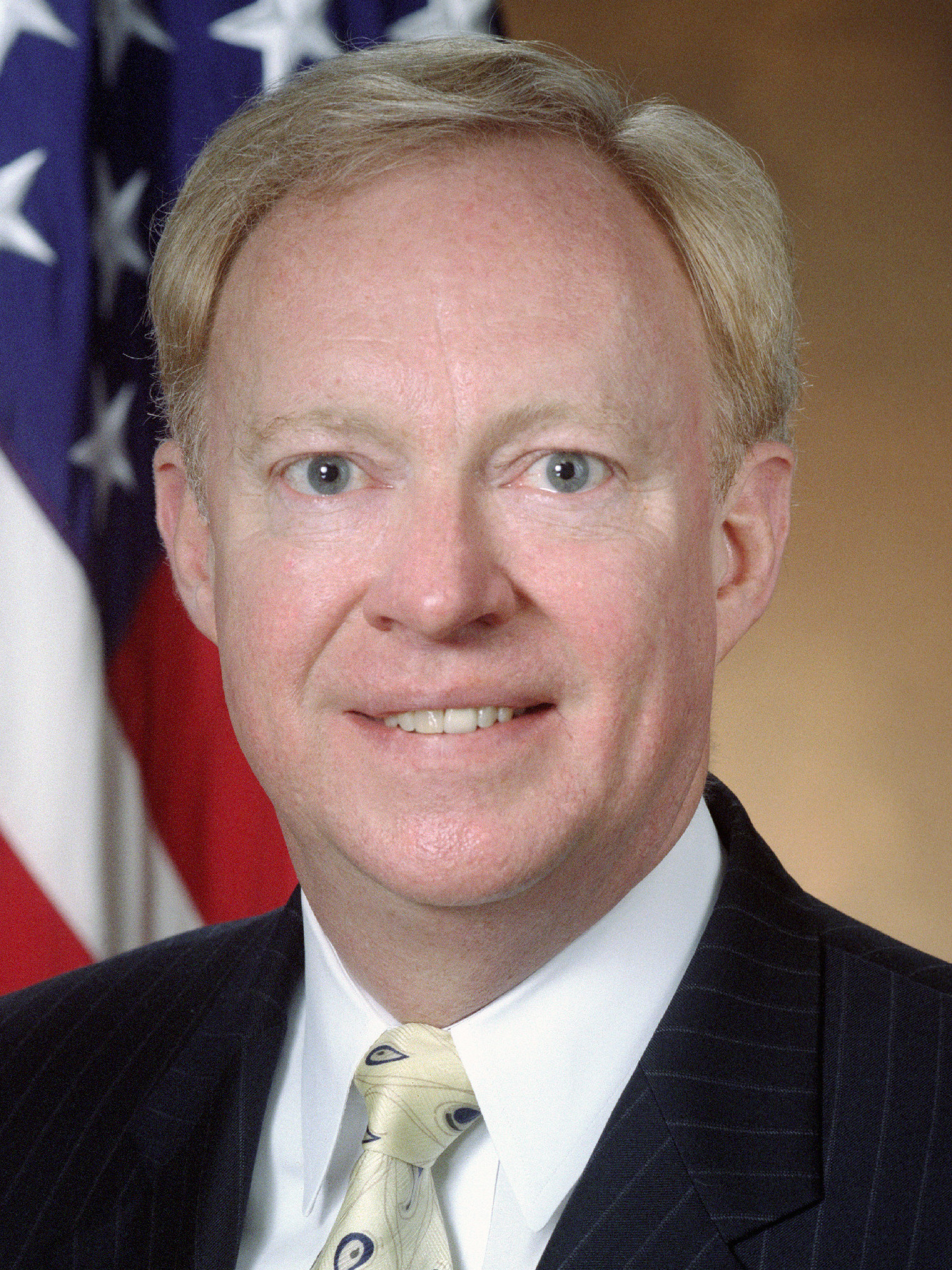
Nominee	Dick Cheney	Bryan Sharratt
Party	Republican	Democratic
Popular vote	118,350	56,527
Percentage	66.62%	31.82%
U.S. Representative before election
Dick Cheney
Republican
Elected U.S. Representative
Dick Cheney
Republican

The 1988 United States House of Representatives election in Wyoming was held on November 8, 1988. Dick Cheney won his final term as Representative as he would resign in order to take the position of Secretary of Defense in George H. W. Bush's administration. Cheney defeated Bryan Sharratt with 66.62% of the vote.

== Republican primary ==
United States House of Representatives Republican primary in Wyoming, 1988
Party	Candidate	Votes	%
Republican	Dick Cheney (incumbent)	59,503	87.49%
Republican	Bob Morris	8,511	12.51%
Total votes		68,014	100%

== Results ==
United States House of Representatives election in Wyoming, 1988
Party	Candidate	Votes	%
Republican	Dick Cheney (incumbent)	118,350	66.62%
Democratic	Bryan Sharratt	56,527	31.82%
Libertarian	Craig Alan McCune	1,906	1.07%
New Alliance	Al Hamburg	868	0.49%
Total votes		177,651	100%
