= 2000 United States Senate election in Wyoming =

- November 7, 2000
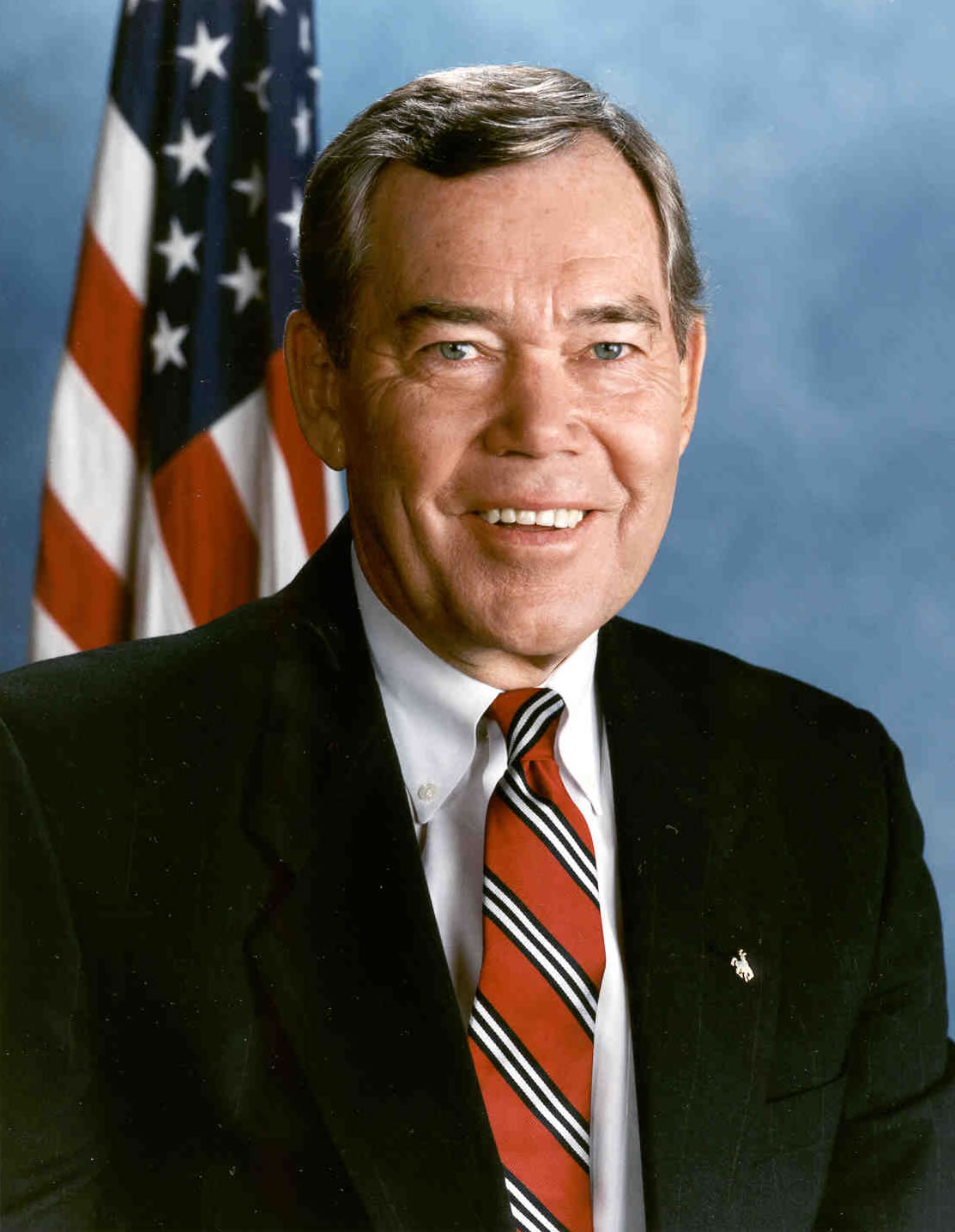

Nominee	Craig L. Thomas	Mel Logan
Party	Republican	Democratic
Popular vote	157,622	47,087
Percentage	73.77%	22.04%
- County results Thomas: 60–70% 70–80% 80–90%
U.S. senator before election
Craig L. Thomas
Republican
Elected U.S. Senator
Craig L. Thomas
Republican

The 2000 United States Senate election in Wyoming was held on November 7, 2000. Incumbent Republican U.S. Senator Craig Thomas won re-election to a second term.

== Democratic primary ==
=== Candidates ===
- Mel Logan, mine worker
- Sheldon Sumey

=== Results ===
Democratic primary results
Party	Candidate	Votes	%
Democratic	Mel Logan	16,530	64.59%
Democratic	Sheldon Sumey	9,062	35.41%
Total votes		29,612	100.00%

== Republican primary ==
=== Candidates ===
- Craig Thomas, incumbent U.S. senator

=== Results ===
Republican primary results
Party	Candidate	Votes	%
Republican	Craig Thomas (Incumbent)	68,132	100.00%
Total votes		68,132	100.00%

== General election ==
=== Candidates ===
- Mel Logan (D), mine worker
- Craig Thomas (R), incumbent U.S. senator

=== Results ===
General election results
Party	Candidate	Votes	%	±%
Republican	Craig Thomas (Incumbent)	157,622	73.77%	+14.90%
Democratic	Mel Logan	47,087	22.04%	−17.27%
Libertarian	Margaret Dawson	8,950	4.19%	+2.37%
Majority		110,535	51.73%	+32.17%
Turnout		213,659		
Republican hold		Swing		

==== Counties that flipped from Democratic to Republican ====
- Albany (largest city: Laramie)

== See also ==
- 2000 United States Senate elections
