= 1994 United States Senate election in Wyoming =

- November 3, 1994
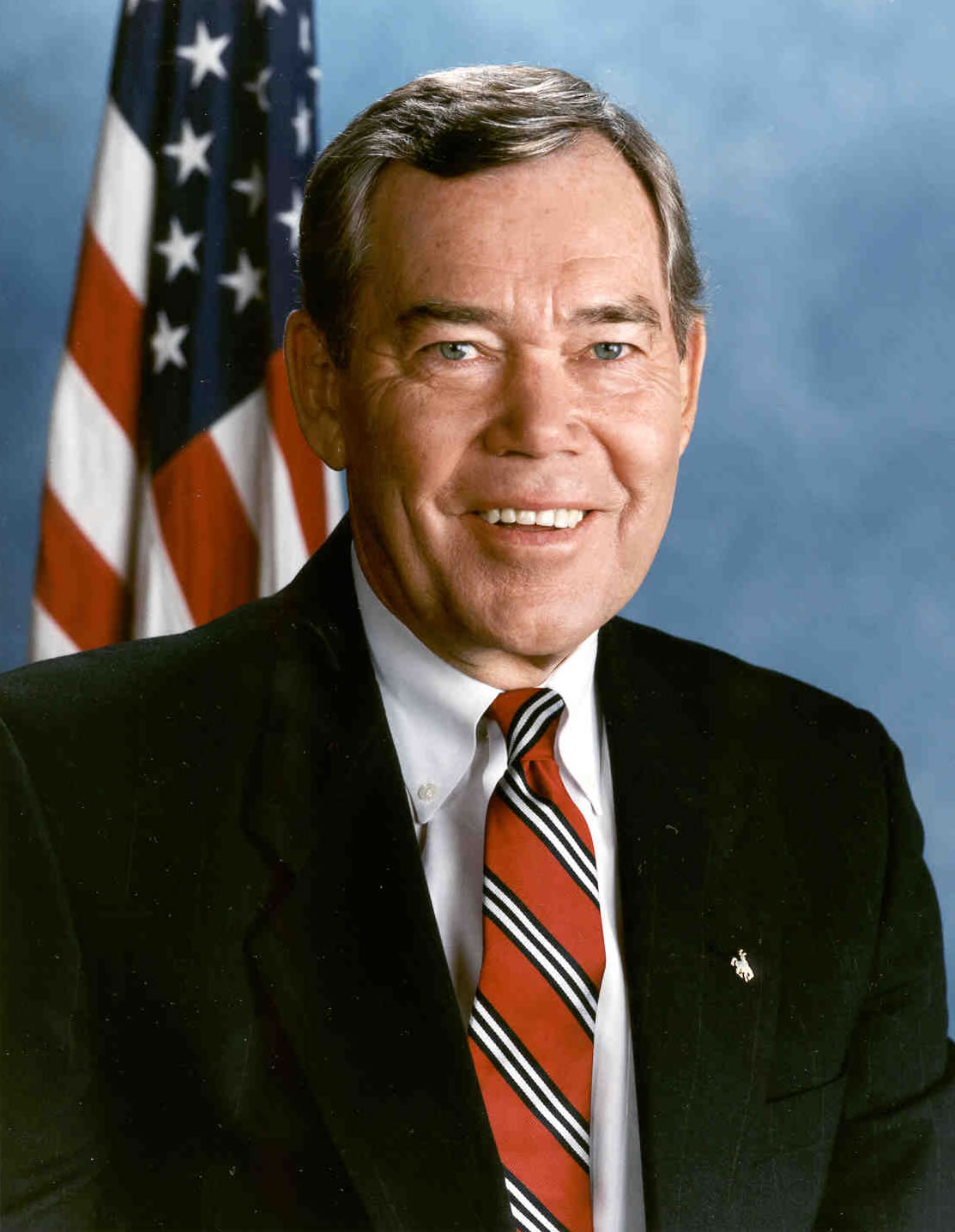

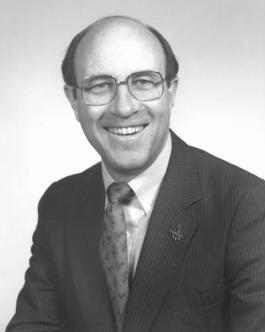
Nominee	Craig L. Thomas	Mike Sullivan
Party	Republican	Democratic
Popular vote	118,754	79,287
Percentage	58.87%	39.31%
- County results Thomas: 50–60% 60–70% 70–80% Sullivan: 40–50%
U.S. senator before election
Malcolm Wallop
Republican
Elected U.S. Senator
Craig L. Thomas
Republican

The 1994 United States Senate election in Wyoming was held November 3, 1994. Incumbent Republican U.S. Senator Malcolm Wallop decided to retire instead of seeking a fourth term. Republican U.S. Representative Craig L. Thomas won the open seat, defeating Democratic Governor Mike Sullivan.

== Major candidates ==
=== Democratic ===
- Mike Sullivan, Governor of Wyoming

=== Republican ===
- Craig L. Thomas, U.S. Representative

== Results ==
General election results
Party	Candidate	Votes	%
Republican	Craig L. Thomas	118,754	58.87
Democratic	Mike Sullivan	79,287	39.31
Libertarian	Craig Alan McClune	3,669	1.82
Majority		39,467	19.57
Turnout		201,710	
Republican hold			

== See also ==
- 1994 United States Senate elections
