= Morna Wood =

American politician

Member of the Wyoming House of Representatives from the Crook-Campbell County district
- In office 1915–1917 Serving with Lyman Ellsbury, Frank Johnstone

Personal details
- Party: Democratic
- Occupation: Politician

Morna A. Wood was an American politician from Sundance, Wyoming, who served a single term in the Wyoming House of Representatives. She was elected in 1914, and represented Crook-Campbell County (Note: According to the Wyoming Legislature, Wood represented the district of Crook County.) from 1915 to 1917 (Note: According to the Wyoming Legislature, Wood only served in 1915.) as a Democrat in the 13th Wyoming Legislature. Wood represented Crook-Campbell County alongside Lyman Ellsbury and Frank Johnstone.

== See also ==
- Anna B. Miller, American politician who served in the Wyoming House of Representatives in the preceding Wyoming Legislature
- Nettie Truax, American politician who represented the Crook-Campbell County district in the Wyoming House of Representatives in the preceding Wyoming Legislature

== Notes ==
Wyoming House of Representatives
Preceded by —	Member of the Wyoming House of Representatives from the Crook-Campbell County district 1915–1917; Served alongside: Lyman Ellsbury, Frank Johnstone	Succeeded by —
