= X League =

X-League or X League may refer to:

- X-League (Japan), an American football league based in Japan, founded in 1971
- X-League Indoor Football, an indoor American football league, played in 2014–2015
- Xleague.tv, a UK broadcast production unit, operated 2007–2009
- X League (women's football), a women's American football league, began play in 2022

== See also ==
- Legio X (disambiguation), various Roman "X Legions"
- Super League X, an English Rugby League season in 2005
- X Division, a style of professional wrestling
- XFL (disambiguation)
  - XFL (2001), a professional American football league in the United States that played for one season in 2001
  - XFL (2020), the second incarnation of the league
