= Craig L. Thomas =

American politician (1933–2007)

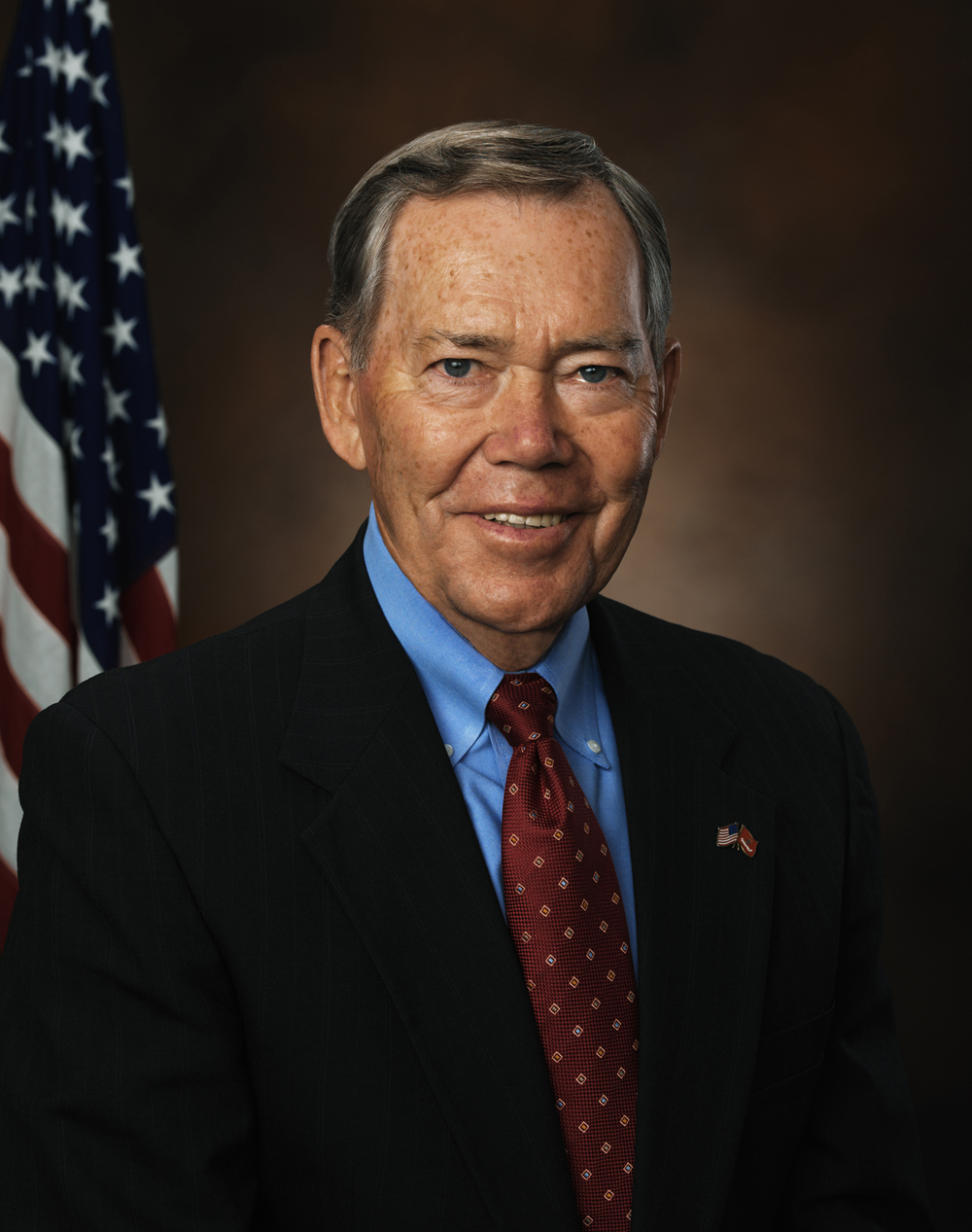
- Official portrait, 2005

United States Senator from Wyoming
- In office January 3, 1995 – June 4, 2007
- Preceded by: Malcolm Wallop
- Succeeded by: John Barrasso

Member of the U.S. House of Representatives from Wyoming's at-large district
- In office April 26, 1989 – January 3, 1995 (Note: Thomas's official service begins on the date of the special election, while he was not sworn in until May 2, 1989.)
- Preceded by: Dick Cheney
- Succeeded by: Barbara Cubin

Member of the Wyoming House of Representatives from the Natrona County district
- In office January 8, 1985 – May 2, 1989
- Preceded by: Joe Stewart
- Succeeded by: Bruce Hinchey

Personal details
- Born: Craig Lyle Thomas; February 17, 1933 Cody, Wyoming, U.S.
- Died: June 4, 2007 (aged 74) Bethesda, Maryland, U.S.
- Party: Republican
- Spouse(s): Leona Francis (divorced); Susan Roberts
- Children: 4
- Education: University of Wyoming

Military service
- Branch/service: United States Marine Corps
- Years of service: 1955–1959
- Rank: Captain
- Thomas's voice Thomas on improving the National Park System; Recorded November 8, 1997

Craig Lyle Thomas (February 17, 1933 – June 4, 2007) was an American politician who served as United States senator from Wyoming from 1995 until his death in 2007. He was a member of the Republican Party. In the Senate, Thomas was considered an expert on agriculture and rural development. He had served in key positions in several state agencies, including a long tenure as Vice President of the Wyoming Farm Bureau from 1965 to 1974. Thomas resided in Casper for twenty-eight years. In 1984, he was elected from Casper to the Wyoming House of Representatives, in which he served until 1989.

In 1989, Dick Cheney, who occupied Wyoming's only seat in the House of Representatives, resigned to become Secretary of Defense. Thomas became the Republican candidate to succeed Cheney and won the April 1989 special election. He was re-elected in 1990 and 1992, and in 1994 he ran for and won the Senate seat being vacated by fellow conservative Republican Malcolm Wallop of Sheridan in northeastern Wyoming. He was re-elected in 2000 and 2006, having easily beaten Democratic candidates in both elections with 70 percent of the vote. He was the last man to occupy Wyoming's only house seat until 2026.

== Family ==
Thomas was married to Leona M. Francis on February 22, 1955, in Uinta, Wyoming. The couple had three sons and one daughter, as well as nine grandchildren. They later divorced. Thomas later married the former Susan Roberts, a public school teacher for special-needs students in Arlington, Virginia.

== Biography ==
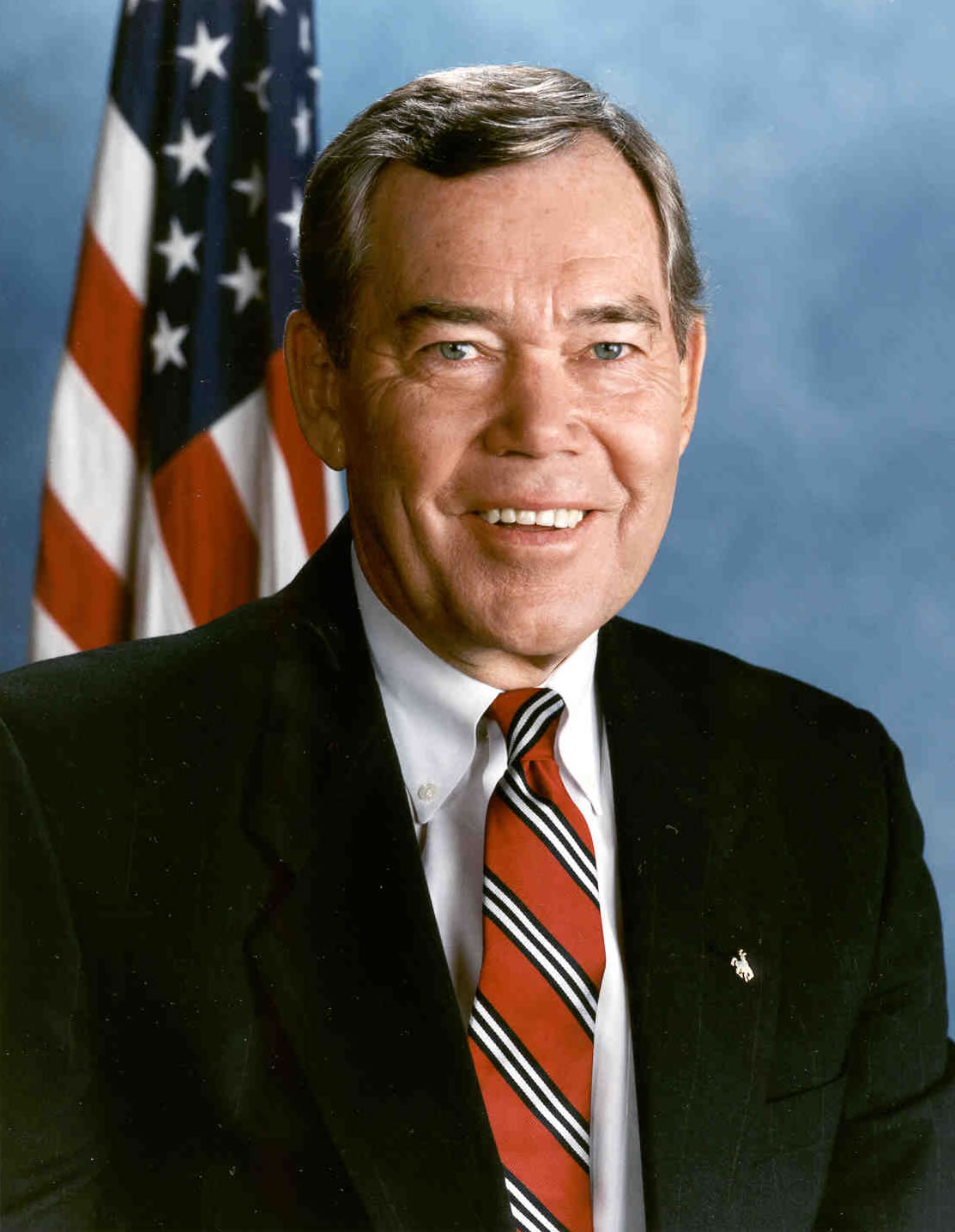
Earlier official portrait of Thomas

Thomas graduated from the University of Wyoming in Laramie with a degree in animal husbandry. At the university he was a member of the Delta Chi Fraternity. Thereafter, he served as an officer in the United States Marine Corps from 1955 to 1959; he attained the rank of Captain. He obtained a law degree from La Salle Extension University, though he did not list it on later official biographies.

In addition to his work with the Farm Bureau, he was general manager of the Wyoming Rural Electrification Administration. After four years in the Wyoming House, Thomas won a special election on April 26, 1989, to replace Dick Cheney as Wyoming's lone member of the United States House of Representatives. He resigned as a state representative effective May 2, 1989 and took his seat in the U.S. House on the same day. He was re-elected to that seat in 1990 and 1992. In 1994, he ran for the United States Senate and won, defeating popular Democratic Governor Mike Sullivan by 20 percentage points. He was elected second term in 2000 with a 74 percent majority, one of the largest margins in Wyoming election history. In the 2006 election he was opposed by Democratic engineer Dale Groutage. Thomas was re-elected to a third term with 70 percent of the ballots even as Democratic Governor Dave Freudenthal was also winning with the same 70 percent margin.

As chairman of the National Parks Subcommittee, Thomas authored legislation to provide funding and management reforms to protect America's national parks into the 21st century. For this and other relevant legislation, Thomas was honored by the National Parks Conservation Association with their William Penn Mott Jr., Park Leadership Award, as well as the National Parks Achievement Award. As the senior member of the Senate's influential Finance Committee, Thomas had been involved in issues such as Social Security, trade, rural health care, and tax reform. As a member of the Senate Finance Committee, Thomas was instrumental in passing the Central America Free Trade Agreement. As co-chair of the Senate Rural Health Caucus, Thomas worked on legislation to improve health care opportunities for rural families.

== Illness and death ==
Thomas entered the hospital shortly before the balloting occurred in November 2006 and was initially treated for pneumonia. Two days after the 2006 election, Thomas' diagnosis of leukemia was announced. He immediately underwent treatment in the form of chemotherapy at the hospital and then returned to work in December, a month earlier than expected. In early 2007, Thomas said he was feeling better than he had in a long time, but he returned to the hospital for a second round of chemotherapy a month later. On June 4, 2007, Thomas was reported in serious condition, struggling with an infection while undergoing a second round of chemotherapy at Bethesda Naval Medical Center in Bethesda, Maryland. Thomas was pronounced dead that same day from complications of leukemia at 9:53 PM EST.

Thomas' services were held in the Methodist Church in Casper on June 9, 2007. The two Senate leaders, Majority Leader Harry Reid (D-NV), and Minority Leader Mitch McConnell (R-KY), headed a delegation of some twenty members of Congress who came to pay respects to the deceased senator. Thomas' burial was in Riverside Cemetery in Cody on June 10.

Under Wyoming law, Governor Freudenthal was required to appoint a new senator from a list of three submitted by the Wyoming Republican Party's central committee because the seat was vacated by a Republican. The GOP met on June 19, 2007, in Casper to select three candidates from thirty applicants to send to the governor. Tom Sansonetti, former state Treasurer Cynthia Lummis, and State Senator John Barrasso were nominated. On June 22, 2007, Governor Dave Freudenthal appointed Barrasso as Thomas's successor in the U.S. Senate.

Thomas has been honored posthumously by having the Visitor Center in Grand Teton National Park named for him. The Craig Thomas Discovery and Visitor Center, in Moose, Wyoming, was dedicated on August 11, 2007, with many dignitaries attending, including Vice President Dick Cheney.

== See also ==
- List of members of the United States Congress who died in office (2000–present)#2000s

Party political offices
Preceded by Malcolm Wallop	Republican nominee for U.S. Senator from Wyoming (Class 1); 1994, 2000, 2006	Succeeded by John Barrasso
U.S. House of Representatives
Preceded by Dick Cheney	Member of the U.S. House of Representatives from Wyoming's at-large congressional district April 26, 1989 – January 3, 1995	Succeeded by Barbara Cubin
U.S. Senate
Preceded by Malcolm Wallop	U.S. senator (Class 1) from Wyoming; January 3, 1995 – June 4, 2007; Served alongside: Alan Simpson, Mike Enzi	Succeeded by John Barrasso
