= Legio X =

Legio X or Tenth Legion may refer to:

- Julius Caesar's Legio X Equestris, also known as Legio X Veneria;
- Augustus's Legio X Gemina, which resulted from the amalgamation of Legio X Equestris with another unknown legion;
- Legio X Fretensis, a legion widely known for the suppression of the First Jewish rebellion. This legion conquered Masada
- Tenth Legion, Virginia, a community in the United States

== See also ==
- List of Roman legions
