= Wind River Transportation Authority =

Provider of mass transportation in Fremont County, Wyoming

- Headquarters: 2554 Airport Drive, Riverton
- Locale: Riverton and Lander, Wyoming
- Service area: Fremont County, Wyoming
- Service type: Bus service, paratransit
- Routes: 2
- Fleet: 8 buses
- Annual ridership: 60,026 (2019)
- Website: WRTA

Wind River Transportation Authority, or WRTA, is the primary provider of mass transportation in Fremont County, Wyoming with two routes serving the region. As of 2019, the system provided 60,026 rides over 15,974 annual vehicle revenue hours with eight buses and six paratransit vehicles.

Public transit in the region began in 1989 when the Shoshone and Arapaho Nations Transit Authority started providing services in Fremont County and the Wind River Indian Reservation. This service became the WRTA in 1996 when the operations were transferred to the Fremont County Association of Governments.

WRTA shut down service from April 2020 until January 12, 2021, due to the COVID-19 pandemic. In summer 2021, there were two runs per day of the bus between Riverton, Lander and other destinations. This was increased to six runs per day in summer 2023 and up to eight runs daily on two routes for winter 2023.

== Service ==
Wind River Transportation Authority operates two bus routes connecting Riverton, Hudson, Lander, Fort Washakie, Ethete, and Kinnear. Each route operates four times daily, either clockwise or counter-clockwise. Hours of operation for the system are Monday through Friday from 5:45 A.M. to 7:20 P.M. There is no service on Saturdays and Sundays. Regular fares are $2.00.

== Fixed route ridership ==
The ridership statistics shown here are for fixed route services only and do not include demand response services.

== See also ==
- List of bus transit systems in the United States
- START Bus
