= Rhoda Truax =

American novelist

Rhoda Truax Silberman (October 28, 1901 – June 29, 2000) was an American author.

== Biography ==
Born Rhoda Truax in New York City to Justice Charles Henry Truax of the New York State Supreme Court and his wife, Caroline Sanders, she was a graduate of the Horace Mann School and Barnard College in New York City. She was the sister of arts administrator and cookbook author and editor, Carol Truax. Rhoda Truax married twice, firstly to Dr Robert Henry Aldrich of Boston in 1924 and later, to Henry R. Silberman, a businessman of Boston, in 1955. She joined the League of American Writers in 1938. In 1950, Robert Heineman alleged that Truax had been a member of the Communist Party between 1943-1949.

Truax wrote 12 novels and historical books, the best known being The Doctors Warren of Boston, published by Houghton Mifflin in 1968. She had lived in Colorado Springs since 1992 and prior to that was a resident of Cambridge, Massachusetts for many decades.

== Selected published works ==
- Hospital, E.P. Dutton and Co, 1932
- Doctors Carry the Keys, E.P. Dutton and Co, 1933
- Barry Scott, M.D: A novel, E.P. Dutton, 1935
- The Accident Ward Mystery, Little, Brown and Co, Boston, 1937 (Hardcover)
- This Dynasty of Doctors, Bobbs-Merrill Company Inc, Indianapolis, 1940
- Green is the Golden Tree, Bobbs-Merril, Indianapolis, 1943
- Joseph Lister, Father of Modern Surgery, Bobbs Merrill, Indianapolis and New York, 1944
- The Doctors Jacobi, Little, Brown and Co, Boston, 1952
- True Adventures of Doctors (with Paul Galdone), Grosset and Dunlap, New York, 1954 (Hardcover, illustrated)
- With Equal Grace, Bobbs-Merrill, Indianapolis, 1964
- The Doctors Warren of Boston: First Family of Surgery, Houghton Mifflin, Boston, 1968 (Hardcover)
