= Nettie Truax =

American politician

Member of the Wyoming House of Representatives from the Crook-Campbell County district
- In office 1913–1915 Serving with S. D. Perry

Personal details
- Party: Democratic
- Occupation: Politician, educator

Nettie Truax was an American politician and educator from Sundance, Wyoming, who served a single term in the Wyoming House of Representatives. She was elected in 1912, and represented Crook-Campbell County (Note: According to the Wyoming Legislature, Truax represented the district of Crook County.) from 1913 to 1915 (Note: According to the Wyoming Legislature, Truax only served in 1913.) as a Democrat in the 12th Wyoming Legislature. Truax represented Crook-Campbell County alongside S. D. Perry.

Truax was one of only two women serving in the Wyoming Legislature in 1913, the other being Anna B. Miller. Outside of the legislature, Truax served as a county superintendent.

== See also ==
- Anna B. Miller, American politician who also served in the Wyoming House of Representatives in the 12th Wyoming Legislature
- Morna Wood, American politician who represented the Crook-Campbell County district in the Wyoming House of Representatives in the subsequent Wyoming Legislature

== Notes ==
Wyoming House of Representatives
Preceded by —	Member of the Wyoming House of Representatives from the Crook-Campbell County district 1913–1915; Served alongside: S. D. Perry	Succeeded by —
