= 1989 Wyoming's at-large congressional district special election =

- April 26, 1989
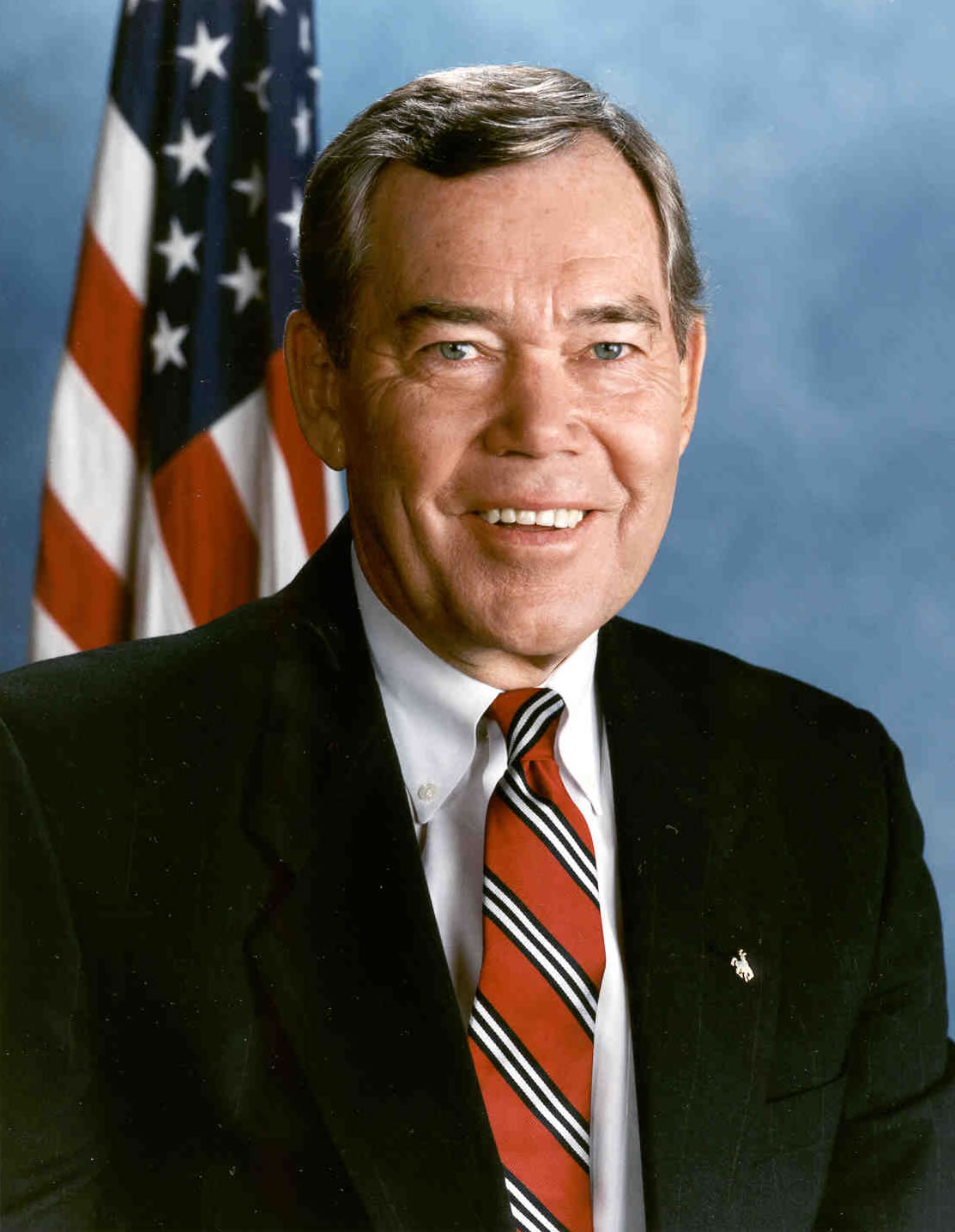

Nominee	Craig L. Thomas	John Vinich
Party	Republican	Democratic
Popular vote	74,384	60,845
Percentage	52.55%	42.98%
- County results Thomas: 40–50% 50–60% 60–70% 70–80% Vinich: 40–50% 50–60%
Member of the House before election
Dick Cheney
Republican
Elected Member of the House
Craig L. Thomas
Republican

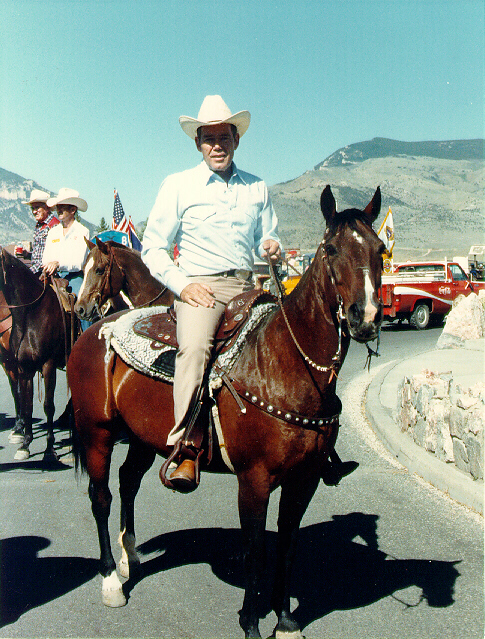
Thomas in Cody, Wyoming in July 1989, shortly after this election

The 1989 Wyoming's at-large congressional district special election was held April 26, 1989. Incumbent Republican Dick Cheney had resigned to become U.S. Secretary of Defense.

State Representative Craig L. Thomas defeated John Vinich with 52.55% of the vote. This was also the first election that white nationalist William Daniel Johnson ran in.

== Results ==
General election
Party	Candidate	Votes	%
Republican	Craig L. Thomas	74,384	52.55%
Democratic	John Vinich	60,845	42.98%
Libertarian	Craig Alan McCune	5,825	4.12%
Independent	William Daniel Johnson	507	0.36%
Total votes		141,561	100%
