= Edward Moore (bishop of Kilmore, Elphin and Ardagh) =

Edward Francis Butler Moore (30 January 1906 – 13 December 1997) was Bishop of Kilmore, Elphin and Ardagh from 1959 to 1981.

== Life ==
His father was the Revd W.R.R Moore. He was educated at Drogheda Grammar School and Trinity College, Dublin. After ordination he was a curate in Bray and then held incumbencies at Castledermot and Greystones. He was Rural Dean of Delgany and (his final appointment before his ordination to the episcopate) Archdeacon of Glendalough. His son was Jimmy Moore, who was a Bishop of Connor.

== Notes ==
Church of Ireland titles
Preceded by Charles John Tyndall	Bishop of Kilmore, Elphin and Ardagh; 1959 –1981	Succeeded by William Gilbert Wilson
