= John R. Perry (judge) =

American politician

Wyoming State District Judge, Sixth Judicial District
- In office 2000–2022
- Appointed by: Jim Geringer
- Succeeded by: Michael James Causey

John Robert Perry (November 12, 1954) is a Retired Wyoming State District Judge who served primarily in the Sixth Judicial District, which consists of Campbell, Crook, and Weston Counties, Wyoming. He was appointed to the bench in 2000 by Governor Jim Geringer and successfully stood for retention in 2002, 2008, 2014, and 2020. As part of his duties, Perry served for 11 years on Wyoming's Board of Judicial Policy and Administration.

In January 2022, Perry was named chair of the Judicial Branch Innovation Task Force, which was charged with reviewing the administrative structure of Wyoming's Judicial Branch of government. At the conclusion of its two-year mission, the task force issued its final report and many of the recommendations were adopted by the Wyoming Judicial Council, the successor to the Board of Judicial Policy and Administration.

In September of 2023, Perry was presented with the Lehman Award for Judicial Excellence. He continues to serve as a judicial mentor and continuing education instructor.

Prior to serving as a District Judge, Perry served eight years as a member of the Wyoming State Senate for the Campbell and Johnson Counties senatorial district. During his time in the State Senate, he was appointed Chair of the Judiciary Committee. Among his many legislative efforts, he was the prime sponsor of the Wyoming Government Reorganization Act of 1989, which was signed into law by Governor Mike Sullivan. In 1994, he unsuccessfully ran for Governor of Wyoming, losing in the Republican Primary to Governor Jim Geringer.

Perry received his undergraduate degree from the University of Utah in 1977 and his law degree from the University of Wyoming in 1980.

He currently resides in Wyoming with his wife, Dr. Christina S. Perry. He has three children: Alexander Truesdale Perry, Dr. Lauren E. Perry-Rummel, City Councilwoman Joanna Settineri, and two step-children.

Legal offices
Preceded by Terrence L. O'Brien	Wyoming State District Judge, Sixth Judicial District; 2000–2022	Succeeded by Michael James Causey
