= Edwin Moore =

Edwin Moore may refer to:

- Edwin Hardwick Moore (1910–2004), British businessman
- Edwin L. Moore (1916–2009), researcher for the United States Department of Agriculture
- Edwin Ward Moore (1810–1865), United States Navy officer
- C. Edwin Moore, American judge in Iowa
