= Truex =

Truex is a surname of Walloon Huguenot origin, found primarily in the United States and Canada. The majority of people with this surname (as well as Truax and other variants) are descended from Philippe Du Trieux, who arrived in New Amsterdam (modern New York) in 1624. People with this surname include:

- Adrienne Truex (1907–1947), American actress better known as Adrienne Ames
- Ernest Truex (1889–1973), American actor
- Martin Truex Sr. (1958–2025), American racing driver
- Martin Truex Jr. (born 1980), American racing driver
- Max Truex (1935–1991), American long-distance runner
- Ruth Truex (1912–2003), American politician
- Ryan Truex (born 1992), American racing driver and brother of Martin Jr.
- Van Day Truex (1904–1979), American interior designer, academic, and painter
- William Snyder Truex (1819–1889), American brigadier general

== See also ==
- Truax (surname)
