= XFL =

XFL may refer to:

== Sports ==
- XFL (2001), an American football league that dissolved after playing a single season
- XFL (2020–2023), an American football league that merged with the United States Football League

== Vehicles ==
- Bell XFL Airabonita, a 1940 U.S. Navy experimental interceptor aircraft
- Jaguar XFL, a 2016–present Sino-British executive sedan
- Loening XFL, a canceled 1933 U.S. Navy fighter aircraft

== Other uses ==
- Xinhua Finance Limited, part of Beat Holdings

== See also ==
- Extreme Football League (disambiguation)
- X League (disambiguation)
