= 1986 Wyoming gubernatorial election =

- November 4, 1986
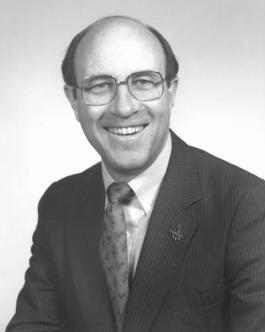

Nominee	Mike Sullivan	Pete Simpson
Party	Democratic	Republican
Popular vote	88,879	75,841
Percentage	53.96%	46.04%
- County results Sullivan: 50–60% 60–70% Simpson: 50–60%
Governor before election
Edgar Herschler
Democratic
Elected Governor
Mike Sullivan
Democratic

The 1986 Wyoming gubernatorial election took place on November 4, 1986. Popular three-term Democratic Governor Edgar Herschler announced that he would not seek a fourth term, creating an open seat. Attorney Mike Sullivan emerged as the unlikely Democratic nominee, and faced former state representative Pete Simpson, the Republican nominee and the brother of then-U.S. senator Alan K. Simpson, in the general election. Despite Sullivan's political inexperience, he was able to defeat Simpson by a decisive margin, winning his first of two terms in office.

== Democratic primary ==
=== Candidates ===
- Mike Sullivan, attorney
- Pat McGuire, rancher
- Keith Goodenough, forester
- Al Hamburg, perennial candidate

=== Results ===
Democratic primary
Party	Candidate	Votes	%
Democratic	Mike Sullivan	29,266	70.92%
Democratic	Pat McGuire	5,406	13.10%
Democratic	Keith Goodenough	4,039	9.79%
Democratic	Al Hamburg	2,554	6.19%
Total votes		41,265	100.00%

== Republican primary ==
=== Candidates ===
- Pete Simpson, former State Representative
- Bill Budd, former state representative
- Fred Schroeder, former chairman of the Republican Party of Wyoming
- Russ Donley, former Speaker of the Wyoming House of Representatives
- David R. Nicholas, state senator
- John R. Johnson, dentist
- Jim L. Bace, computer programmer, 1982 Republican candidate for governor

=== Results ===
Republican primary
Party	Candidate	Votes	%
Republican	Pete Simpson	25,948	27.58%
Republican	Bill Budd	25,495	27.10%
Republican	Fred Schroeder	15,013	15.96%
Republican	Russ Donley	12,979	13.80%
Republican	David R. Nicholas	11,092	11.79%
Republican	John R. Johnson	3,139	3.34%
Republican	Jim Bace	402	0.43%
Total votes		94,068	100.00%

== Results ==
Sullivan spent $102,219 during the primary and $150,000 in the general election compared to Simpson spending around $300,000 in the primary and $200,000 in the general election.

1986 Wyoming gubernatorial election
Party	Candidate	Votes	%	±%
Democratic	Mike Sullivan	88,879	53.96%	−9.18%
Republican	Pete Simpson	75,841	46.04%	+9.18%
Majority		13,038	7.92%	−18.37%
Turnout		164,720		
Democratic hold				
