= Carol Truax =

Carol Truax (3 October 1899 – June 1986) was an American music administrator and an author of many cookbooks. She was noted both for her time as Executive Director of Fine Arts at Colorado College (1945–1951), and also as consultant in Fine Arts to the State University of New York. As author, Miss Truax's most famous publications include Liberace Cooks (1970). She was the sister of author Rhoda Truax.

== Early life ==
Born and raised in New York to Justice Charles Henry Truax of the New York State Supreme Court and his wife, Caroline Sanders, Carol Truax came to Colorado in 1920 to improve her health and for many years operated a prominent bookstore in Colorado Springs. In 1940 she became manager of the Colorado College Bookstore.

== As music administrator ==
On the occasion of the Stokowski Youth Orchestra concert in June 1941 (at Colorado College), she was called upon to handle all promotional details. This led to her becoming first Promotional Secretary of the college, then Executive Secretary (1945) and finally Executive Director (1947) of the Fine Arts Departments - Music, Dance and Drama.

During her affiliation with the college she served on the board of directors of the Civic Players, the Colorado Springs Symphony Orchestra and the Colorado Springs Fine Arts Center.

Highlights of the Truax administration at Colorado College were the growth of the composition and piano departments during the residencies of husband and wife team Roy and Johana Harris (1943–48) and of the voice department under John C. Wilcox (1946–49); the residence of the LaSalle String Quartet (1949–54); and the excellent summer sessions which brought to the Colorado College campus such musical celebrities as Burrill Phillips (1946), Nicolas Slonimsky (1947–49), Louis Persinger (1949–50), Paul Hindemith (1949), Virgil Thomson (1950), Willi Apel (1950–52) and many others.

She resigned from the college in the spring of 1951 to accept a position as treasurer of the Aspen Institute for Humanistic Studies and Director of Publicity for the Aspen Festival. Only two months later she was invited to direct a fine arts research survey for the 33 colleges of the State University of New York and was awarded a full professorship from that institution. Carol Truax later married Renaissance musicologist Gustave Reese.

From 1961 she was director of the Broadmoor International Theatre in Colorado Springs, booking such artists as Liberace, the Smothers Brothers, Dinah Shore and many others. In 1968, a Gazette Telegraph entertainment columnist wrote, "Carol has been fortunate in being able to attract the big names each year, paying them less than they could command in some of the metropolitan areas, simply because they like it here. In most cases, the personalities are willing to take the cut in price because they could combine a vacation in beautiful Colorado Springs with a few days or a week's work." Whilst this was true, some entertainers also used Broadmoor as a testing ground for their act, before unleashing it on Las Vegas.

== As author ==
Carol Truax wrote or edited over 20 cookbooks, including many for Woman's Day and Ladies Home Journal and was a regular contributor to Gourmet magazine. She also collaborated with Liberace, publishing Liberace Cooks (Doubleday, 1970), a cookbook of recipes from the seven dining rooms of the flamboyant pianist and showman.

== Selected publications ==
- The 60 Minute Chef (with Lillian Bueno McCue), Macmillan Co, NY, 1947 (hardcover)
- Ladies Home Journal Cookbook (Editor), Doubleday, NY, 1960 (hardcover)
- The Weekend Chef, Doubleday, NY, 1961 (hardcover)
- Ladies Home Journal Dessert Cookbook (Editor), Doubleday, NY, 1964 (hardcover)
- Father was a Gourmet, Doubleday, NY, 1965 (hardcover)
- The Art of Salad Making, Doubleday, NY, 1968 (hardcover)
- The Cattleman's Steakbook (with S. Omar Barker), Crosset & Dunlap, NY, 1970 (hardcover)
- Liberace Cooks (co-author), Doubleday, 1970 (hardcover)
- Gourmet Entertaining on a Budget, Doubleday, 1972
- The Soup and Sandwich Cookbook, Bantam Books, NY, 1973 (paperback)
- Cheese and Wine, Ballantine Books, NY, 1975 (paperback)
- The Woman's Day Chicken Cookbook, Simon and Schuster, 1977
- 500 Super Stews, Ballantine, 1977
- The Woman's Day Book of Thin Italian Cooking, Houghton Mifflin, 1978
- The Woman's Day Book of Salads, Dutton, 1980
- All About Steam Cooking, Doubleday, 1981
- Woman's Day Buffet Cookbook, Ballantine, 1982 (softcover)
- Woman's Day Simply Delicious Cold Dishes, Doubleday, 1987
- The Woman's Day Book of Light Italian Cooking, Random House, 1988
