= Wyoming Medical Center =

Coordinates: 42°50′53″N 106°18′29″W

Banner Wyoming Medical Center
- Banner Health

Geography
- Location: Casper, Wyoming, United States

Organization
- Type: Community

Services
- Emergency department: Level II Trauma Center
- Beds: 249

History
- Former name: Memorial Hospital of Natrona County
- Founded: 1911

Links
- Website: https://www.bannerhealth.com/locations/casper/wyoming-medical-center
- Lists: Hospitals in Wyoming

Banner Wyoming Medical Center, formerly the Memorial Hospital of Natrona County, is a non-profit hospital owned by Banner Health that is located in Casper, Natrona County, Wyoming, United States.

== History ==
In 1986, the Memorial Hospital of Natrona County was reorganized into the Wyoming Medical Center.

In 1990, Intermountain Health Care Professional Services sold its Casper Surgical Center to Wyoming Medical Center.

In 2020, Banner Health and Wyoming Medical Center started the process of WMC being acquired by Banner Health in $200 million deal.

On October 1, 2020, Wyoming Medical Center officially affiliates with Banner Health.
