= Bryan Sharratt =

American lawyer and businessman (1947-2007)

Bryan Edwards Sharratt
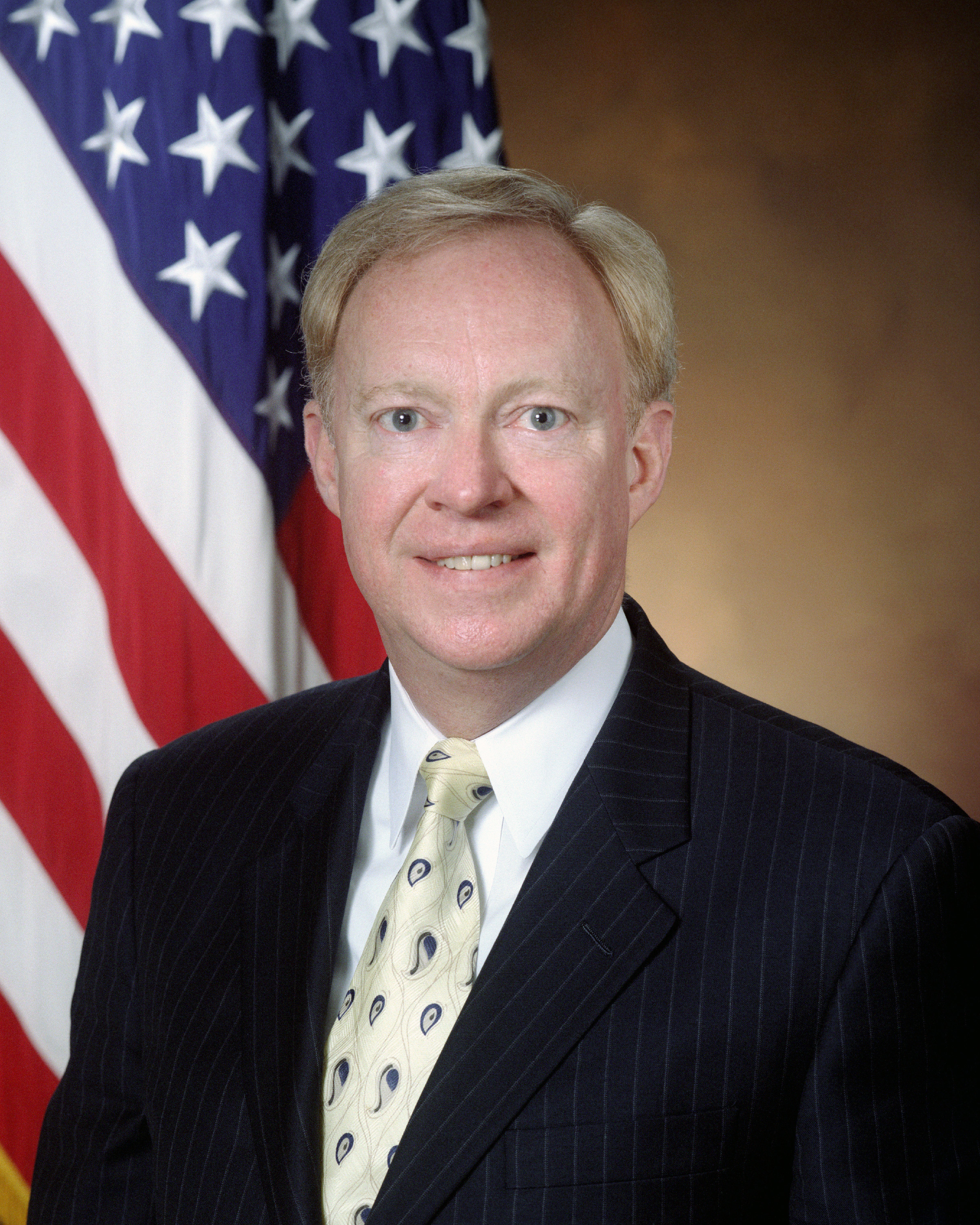
- Bryan Sharratt in May 2000
- Born: Bryan Edwards Sharratt; October 13, 1947; Bethesda, Maryland, U.S.
- Died: August 16, 2007 (aged 59); Arlington, Virginia, U.S.
- Resting place: Arlington National Cemetery
- Education: Duke University; Duke University School of Law (JD); University of Wyoming (MBA)
- Occupations: Accountant, real estate broker
- Political party: Democratic
- Spouse(s): (1) Amy Jo Mank Sharratt (2) Ann Marie Sharratt (married 1997–his death)
- Children: Carroll Craig Sharratt; Jo Marie McGuire
- Military career
- Allegiance: United States of America
- Branch: United States Navy; United States Air Force
- Rank: Lieutenant colonel

Notes
- As the Democratic nominee for Wyoming's lone seat in the United States House of Representatives in 1988, Sharratt lost to incumbent Dick Cheney, later the United States Secretary of Defense and the Vice President of the United States. (2) Sharratt worked to elect Bill Clinton as U.S. President in 1992, but his state voted for Republican George Herbert Walker Bush, whom Clinton unseated.

Bryan Edwards Sharratt (October 13, 1947 – August 16, 2007) was a United States Navy and Air Force officer, a lawyer, a Certified Public Accountant, a real estate broker, and a Democratic politician from Wyoming. After losing his Wyoming's at-large congressional district seat in the United States House of Representatives to Richard B. "Dick" Cheney in 1988, Sharratt campaigned for Bill Clinton for the presidency of the United States in 1992 and for John Kerry in 2004.

Sharratt graduated from Duke University in 1968 and then earned a J.D. degree from the Duke University School of Law in 1971. After graduation from law school, he joined the Navy Judge Advocate General's Corps. After completing his active duty commitment as a Navy lieutenant, Sharratt joined the Air Force Reserve. He continued his education by receiving an M.B.A. degree from the University of Wyoming in 1977. Sharratt retired from military service as an Air Force lieutenant colonel having earned three Meritorious Service Medals.

After his death from heart disease, Sharratt was interred at Arlington National Cemetery on November 5, 2007.

== See also ==
Preceded by Rick Gilmore, 1986	Democratic nominee for Wyoming's at-large seat in the United States House of Representatives Bryan Edwards Sharratt; 1988	Succeeded by Pete Maxfield, 1990
