= Wyoming State Bar =

Bar Association

- Type: Legal Society
- Headquarters: Cheyenne, WY
- Location: United States
- Members: 3,026 in 2012 (739 out of state)
- Website: http://www.Wyomingbar.org/

The Wyoming State Bar is the integrated (mandatory) bar association of the U.S. state of Wyoming.

== History ==
The Wyoming State Bar was organized in 1915 as a voluntary association, and integrated by the state legislature in 1939.

== Structure ==
The Bar is managed by a 12-member Board of Officers and Commissioners. Supporting the Board are more than twenty Boards and Committees.

The Bar enforces the rule that Wyoming lawyers must complete 15 credits of Continuing Legal Education each year.

The Wyoming State Bar publishes the monthly Wyoming Bar Journal and the biannual Wyoming Law Review which includes scholarly articles by national legal authorities, and case notes and comments written by students at the University of Wyoming College of Law.
