= Eddie D. Moore =

American politician (1926–2011)

Member of the Wyoming Senate
- In office 1975–1986

Personal details
- Born: February 12, 1926
- Died: May 26, 2011 (aged 85)
- Party: Republican
- Children: 5

Eddie D. Moore (February 12, 1926 – May 26, 2011) was an American politician. He served as a Republican member of the Wyoming Senate.

== Life and career ==
Moore attended Converse County High School.

Moore served in the Wyoming Senate from 1975 to 1986. He was Senate Majority Leader in 1981–1982 and President of the Senate in 1983–1984.

Moore died on May 26, 2011, at the age of 85, following a decade-long battle with Parkinson's disease and cancer.
