= Nyla Murphy =

American politician

Member of the Wyoming House of Representatives
- In office 1979–1991

Personal details
- Born: January 31, 1931 Stilesville, Indiana, U.S.
- Died: June 6, 2015 (aged 84) Laramie, Wyoming, U.S.
- Party: Republican

Nyla A. Murphy (January 31, 1931 – June 6, 2015) was an American lawyer, real estate broker, flight attendant, and politician. A Republican, she served in the Wyoming House of Representatives for 12 years from 1979 to 1991. She lived in Casper, Wyoming and represented Natrona County.

== Biography ==
Nyla A. Murphy was born on January 31, 1931, in Stilesville, Indiana. She graduated from Arsenal Technical High School in 1949, and attended Butler University, but had to drop out due to work. She met Charles J. Huff while working as an airline stewardess. She married him, had three children, and moved to Wyoming before his death in 1977. She graduated from the University of Wyoming with a Bachelor of Science in political science in 1989, and from the University of Wyoming College of Law in 1993.

Nyla operated a real estate business. She practice law in Riverton for a few years before moving back to Laramie and creating her own law practice.

During Murphy's tenure in the state house she served on the Labor, Health, and Social Services, Mines, Minerals, and Industrial Development, and Judiciary committees.

She died from bile duct cancer at Ivinson Memorial Hospital in Laramie, Wyoming, on June 6, 2015.

== Political positions ==
The Wyoming Right to Choose PAC reported Murphy as supporting abortion rights during the 1990 gubernatorial election.

== Works cited ==
- Jost, Loren, ed. (1991). Wyoming Blue Book (PDF). Vol. 4. Wyoming State Archives.
