= List of justices of the Wyoming Supreme Court =

Following is a list of justices of the Wyoming Supreme Court, including the judges who served as chief justices.

== Justices of the Wyoming Territorial Supreme Court ==
Judge	Party affiliation	Began active service	Ended active service	Began service as Chief Justice	Ended service as Chief Justice
John H. Howe	Republican	April 6, 1869	October 14, 1871	April 6, 1869	October 14, 1871
William Theopilus Jones	Republican	April 6, 1869	March 20, 1873		
Joseph W. Fisher	Republican	February 8, 1871	December 18, 1879	October 14, 1871	December 18, 1879
Joseph M. Carey	Republican	January 18, 1872	February 14, 1876		
E.A. Thomas	Republican	March 20, 1873	December 14, 1877		
Jacob B. Blair	Republican	February 14, 1876	April 23, 1888		
William Ware Peck	Republican	December 14, 1877	January 11, 1882		
James Beverley Sener	Republican	December 18, 1879	July 5, 1884	December 18, 1879	July 5, 1884
Samuel C. Parks	Republican	January 11, 1882	April 14, 1886		
John C. Perry	Republican	1884	1884	1884	1884
John W. Lacey	Republican	July 5, 1884	November 8, 1886	July 5, 1884	November 8, 1886
Samuel T. Corn	Democrat	April 14, 1886	June 21, 1890		
William L. Maginnis	Democrat	November 8, 1886	October 1, 1889	November 8, 1886	October 1, 1889
Micah C. Saufley	Democrat	April 23, 1888	October 11, 1890		
Willis Van Devanter	Republican	October 1, 1889	October 11, 1890	October 1, 1889	October 11, 1890
Asbury B. Conaway	Republican	June 21, 1890	October 11, 1890		

== Justices of the Wyoming State Supreme Court ==
Judge	Began active service	Ended active service	Chief Justice
Willis Van Devanter	October 11, 1890	October 15, 1890	
Asbury B. Conaway	October 11, 1890	December 8, 1897	
Herman V.S. Groesbeck	October 11, 1890	January 4, 1897	
Homer Merrell	November 24, 1890	January 2, 1893	
Gibson Clark	January 2, 1893	September 22, 1894	
Samuel T. Corn	September 22, 1894; January 4, 1897	January 7, 1895; January 2, 1905	
Charles N. Potter	January 7, 1895	December 20, 1927	
Jesse Knight	December 18, 1897	April 9, 1905	
Cyrus Beard	January 2, 1905	December 16, 1920	
Josiah A. Van Orsdel	April 15, 1905	January 31, 1906	
Richard H. Scott	February 24, 1906	September 26, 1917	
Charles E. Blydenburgh	November 1, 1907	April 17, 1921	
Ralph Kimball	January 3, 1921	January 7, 1952	
Fred H. Blume	April 23, 1921	January 1, 1963	
William A. Riner	January 10, 1928	November 20, 1955	
Harry P. Ilsley	January 7, 1952	February 18, 1953	
Harry Harnsberger	March 12, 1953	January 1, 1969	
Glenn Parker	December 5, 1955	January 6, 1975	
John J. McIntyre	January 2, 1961	November 30, 1974	
Norman B. Gray	January 7, 1963	December 31, 1971	
Leonard McEwan	January 6, 1969	January 21, 1975	
Rodney M. Guthrie	January 1, 1972	December 31, 1978	
Archie G. McClintock	July 1, 1973	March 26, 1981	
John F. Raper	December 18, 1974	June 14, 1983	
Richard V. Thomas	December 30, 1974	1998	
Robert R. Rose Jr.	March 15, 1975	November 1, 1985	
John J. Rooney	January 1, 1979	November 30, 1985	
C. Stewart Brown	March 26, 1981	June 30, 1988	
G. Joseph Cardine	June 14, 1983	July 1994	
Walter C. Urbigkit Jr.	November 1, 1985	January 1993	1991–1993
Richard J. Macy	December 2, 1985	June 2, 2000	1993–1995
Michael Golden	June 30, 1988	October 15, 2012	1995–1996
William A. Taylor	January 22, 1993	2001	1997–1998
Larry Lehman	July 8, 1994	2004	1999–2002
William U. Hill	November 3, 1998	February 16, 2018	2002–2005
Marilyn S. Kite	March 30, 2000	August 3, 2015	2010–2014
Barton Voigt	March 21, 2001	January 6, 2014	2006–2010
E. James Burke	January 1, 2005	October 8, 2018	2014–2018
Michael K. Davis	August 30, 2012	January 16, 2022	2018–2021
Kate M. Fox	January 1, 2014	May 27, 2025	2021–2025
Keith G. Kautz	August 1, 2015	March 26, 2024	
Lynne J. Boomgaarden	December 15, 2017	Present	2025–present
Kari Jo Gray	September 5, 2018	Present	
John G. Fenn	January 17, 2022	Present	
Robert Jarosh	March 27, 2024	Present	
Bridget Hill	May 28, 2025	Present	
