= Urbigkit =

Urbigkit is a surname. Notable people with the surname include:

- Dale Urbigkit (born 1952), American politician
- Ralph Urbigkit (died 2015), American politician
- Walter Urbigkit (1927–2011), American politician
