= Richard H. Scott =

American judge (1858–1917)

Justice of the Wyoming Supreme Court
- In office February 24, 1906 – September 26, 1917
- Appointed by: Bryant Butler Brooks
- Preceded by: Josiah Alexander Van Orsdel
- Succeeded by: Charles E. Blydenburgh

Chief Justice of the Wyoming Supreme Court
- In office January 1, 1913 – 1915
- Preceded by: Charles N. Potter
- Succeeded by: Jesse Knight

Personal details
- Born: September 3, 1858 Minneapolis, Minnesota, U.S.
- Died: September 26, 1917 (aged 59) Cheyenne, Wyoming, U.S.
- Spouse: Agnes Delight Coates
- Children: 5
- Education: United States Naval Academy

Richard H. Scott (September 3, 1858 – September 26, 1917) was an American jurist who served as a justice of the Wyoming Supreme Court from February 24, 1906, until his death.

== Early life and education ==
Born in Minneapolis, Minnesota, Charles and Margaret (Hamilton) Scott, he pursued his early education in the public schools and afterward attended the United States Naval Academy at Annapolis, Maryland, from 1876 until his graduation in 1880. He served one year in the Navy before resigning his commission, working as a government surveyor work in the summer, while in the winter he studied law at Jordan, Minnesota, until admitted to practice at the bar of Minnesota in 1884.

== Legal and political career ==
In 1886, Scott moved from Minnesota to Wyoming, becoming a resident of Wyoming on July 5, 1886, establishing a private practice of law in Sundance, in Crook County.

The success of his legal practice led to his selection as a member of the Wyoming constitutional convention of 1889, where he aided in framing the organic law of the state. The following year he was chosen judge of the first judicial district of Wyoming and served on that court for sixteen years, until 1906. On February 3, 1906, Governor Bryant Butler Brooks appointed Scott to a seat on the Wyoming Supreme Court vacated by Josiah Alexander Van Orsdel, who held the seat briefly following the death of Jesse Knight. In the general election that year, Scott ran as a Republican against former justice Herman V.S. Groesbeck, who ran as a Socialist. Scott won by an overwhelming margin. He was again reelected in 1910, and on January 1, 1913, he became chief justice of Wyoming, continuing in that role until 1915. In that year he was again reelected a judge of the supreme court to serve for another term of eight years, but died less than two years into his final term.

== Personal life ==
Scott married Agnes Delight Coates of Jordan, Minnesota on July 1, 1885. They had five children together.

Scott died in Cheyenne, Wyoming, after a long illness.

Political offices
Preceded by Josiah Alexander Van Orsdel	Justice of the Wyoming Supreme Court; 1906–1917	Succeeded by Charles E. Blydenburgh
