= Magruder Mountain =

Magruder Mountain may refer to:

- Magruder Mountain (Idaho)
- Magruder Mountain (Nevada)
