= 1952 Wyoming state elections =

A general election was held in the U.S. state of Wyoming on Tuesday, November 4, 1952. Two statewide elections were held: a special election for Wyoming State Treasurer following the death of incumbent Treasurer J. Roy Mitchell, and an election for a seat on the Supreme Court of Wyoming. Incumbent Treasurer Minnie A. Mitchell, who had been appointed to succeed her husband by Governor Frank A. Barrett, won the election to serve the balance of her husband's term, and Justice Harry P. Ilsley was unopposed for re-election.

== Treasurer ==
On May 6, 1952, incumbent Republican State Treasurer J. Roy Mitchell, who had just been elected to his post in 1950, died in office. On May 13, Governor Barrett announced that he was appointing Minnie A. Mitchell as her husband's successor, making her the state's first woman to serve as State Treasurer. Following Mitchell's death, a special election was held to fill the balance of his term. In accepting the appointment as Treasurer, Minnie Mitchell agreed to run in the special election.

=== Democratic primary ===
No Democratic candidates filed to run for State Treasurer, but the Wyoming Democratic Party organized a write-in campaign for John Bentley, an insurance broker in Sheridan. In the primary election, the write-in campaign succeeded in getting Bentley 1,789 votes, enough to earn him the nomination, which he accepted.

=== Republican primary ===
==== Candidates ====
- Minnie A. Mitchell, incumbent State Treasurer

==== Results ====
Republican Primary results
| Party | Candidate | Votes | % |
|---|---|---|---|
| Republican | Minnie A. Mitchell (inc.) | 33,817 | 100.00% |
| Total votes | | 33,817 | 100.00% |

=== General election ===
==== Results ====
1952 Wyoming Treasurer special election
| Party | Candidate | Votes | % | ±% |
|---|---|---|---|---|
| Republican | Minnie A. Mitchell (inc.) | 72,591 | 58.68% | +2.35% |
| Democratic | John Bentley | 51,112 | 41.32% | −2.35% |
| Majority | | 21,479 | 17.36% | +4.70 |
| Turnout | | 123,703 | | |
| Republican hold | | | | |

== Supreme Court of Wyoming ==
On December 7, 1951, Justice Ralph Kimball of the Supreme Court of Wyoming announced that he would step down from the court effective January 7, 1952. A week later, on December 14, Governor Frank A. Barrett announced that he would appoint Judge Harry P. Ilsley of the Sixth Judicial District Court to fill the balance of Kimball's term, which expired on January 5, 1953. Ilsley announced that he would seek re-election to the Court on May 15, 1952,

When no candidates filed to run against him, Ilsley won re-election unopposed, receiving 100% of the votes cast in the August primary and in the November general election. However, several weeks into Ilsley's first full term in office, he died, and was succeeded by Justice Harry Harnsberger.

=== Candidates ===
- Harry P. Ilsley, Associate Justice of the Supreme Court of Wyoming

=== Primary results ===
Nonpartisan primary results
| Party | Candidate | Votes | % |
|---|---|---|---|
| Nonpartisan | Harry P. Ilsley (inc.) | 57,252 | 100.00% |
| Total votes | | 57,252 | 100.00% |

=== General election results ===
Nonpartisan primary results
| Party | Candidate | Votes | % |
|---|---|---|---|
| Nonpartisan | Harry P. Ilsley (inc.) | 106,454 | 100.00% |
| Total votes | | 106,454 | 100.00% |
