= Judge Kimball =

Judge Kimball may refer to:

- Catherine D. Kimball (born 1945), first female judge of the Louisiana 18th Judicial District
- Dale A. Kimball (born 1939), judge of the United States District Court for the District of Utah
- Erik P. Kimball (fl. 1980s–2020s), bankruptcy judge of the United States District Court for the Southern District of Florida
- Ivory Kimball (1843–1916), police court judge in Washington, D.C.
- Ralph Kimball (judge) (1878–1959), Wyoming district court judge.

== See also ==
- Justice Kimball (disambiguation)
