= Magruder murders =

1863 robbery-murder in Idaho Territory

- The Forest Service sign at the traditional murder site
- Location: 45.7423°N 114.7814°W; Bitterroot Mountains, Idaho Territory (present-day Idaho County, Idaho)
- Date: Night of October 11, 1863 (Note: A report published in December 1863 gave the date as the night of October 10, based on Page's confession as relayed to The Dalles Mountaineer. Welch, working from the trial transcript, also gives the night of October 11, saying that an attempt planned for the night before was called off. The historian Frederick Allen gives October 10, Hamilton gives October 8, and a 1932 family history notes that October 13 has also been given. A later note in the Luna House register, as quoted by the historian Alfreda Elsensohn, records under October 10 that the party had been murdered "last night".)
- Target: Lloyd Magruder's pack train
- Attack type: Robbery, mass murder
- Weapons: Axes, shotgun
- Deaths: 5
- Perpetrators: David Renton (alias "Doc" Howard), Christopher Lower, James Romain
- Motive: Robbery of gold dust
- Convicted: 3 (hanged March 4, 1864)

The Magruder murders, also called the Magruder massacre, were the robbery and killing of Lewiston merchant Lloyd Magruder and four traveling companions in the Bitterroot Mountains of Idaho Territory in October 1863. Magruder was returning from trading in the Virginia City gold camps with $11,000–12,000 in gold dust (about $290,000–310,000 in 2025 dollars). Three of the men traveling with him killed him and the others in camp, while a fourth, William Page, stood by.

The killers were pursued by Magruder's friend Hill Beachy (also spelled Beachey), a Lewiston hotel and stage-line owner who followed them to San Francisco and brought them back to Lewiston to stand for trial. Page turned state's evidence.

The trial at Lewiston in January 1864 was described at the time as the first case tried by any court of the new territory, and the three convicted men were hanged there on March 4, 1864.

Because Idaho Territory had no criminal code when the crime was committed, two justices of the Idaho Supreme Court gave an informal opinion in 1961 that the men had been unlawfully hanged. Magruder Mountain and the Magruder Corridor road across the Bitterroots are named for Lloyd Magruder.

== Lloyd Magruder's early life ==
Lloyd Magruder Jr. was born on July 7, 1825, at Locust Grove, his grandfather's farm in Montgomery County, Maryland, and was orphaned at eleven. At twenty he moved to Batesville, Arkansas, where he worked as a surveyor and studied law. On June 3, 1846, he enlisted in Archibald Yell's Arkansas Mounted Volunteers for the Mexican–American War. He was on detached duty in the quartermaster's department at the Battle of Buena Vista in February 1847, and that April he was appointed a second lieutenant in the 12th U.S. Infantry and sent home to recruit. He married Caroline Elizabeth Pelham on August 10, 1847, took fifty recruits to Mexico that December, and resigned his commission in February 1848. In March 1849 he left for the California gold fields with his brother-in-law, Dr. James E. Pelham. A store he kept at the mining town of St. Louis, in Sierra County, burned and left him about $10,000 in debt. At Marysville he was a merchant, lawyer and partner in the Marysville Express newspaper, and served as justice of the peace, county clerk (elected in 1855 on the Know Nothing ticket) and assistant marshal for the 1860 census. In February 1860 the family's property was sold at a sheriff's sale to satisfy the old debt. He was elected to the California State Assembly from Yuba County in 1860 and sat in the 1861 session as a Breckinridge Democrat. During the secession crisis he offered resolutions at a Democratic legislative caucus endorsing the Crittenden Compromise.

In February 1861 he signed a minority report against an Assembly resolution supporting the Union, which refused to pledge California to "either a Northern or Southern fragment of a dismembered confederacy". In May, after the attack on Fort Sumter, he voted for a loyalty resolution "as a supporter of the Constitution—not as an endorser of the policy of Abraham Lincoln". His faction then passed him over as a delegate to its state convention.

== Life in Lewiston and political involvement ==
The Luna House in Lewiston about 1868. Hill Beachy ran his stage line from the hotel, and the killers were later held in its upstairs rooms.

In April 1862 Magruder left Marysville for the Salmon River mines, then in Washington Territory, and settled at Lewiston. He became a merchant and packer, with a store at Elk City run with partners including Wesley Wickersham, and his wife and children joined him in Lewiston. His friend from Marysville, Hill Beachy, a former steamboat pilot who had kept saloons and hotels in California, kept the Luna House hotel in Lewiston. Two of the hotel's upstairs rooms served as the town jail. Beachy also ran a stage line to Walla Walla. Lewiston had already seen vigilante justice: in 1862 a crowd hanged three accused robbers.

Congress created Idaho Territory in March 1863, and Lewiston became its first capital. The first governor, the Republican William H. Wallace, arrived there in July and called the territory's first elections for October 31, including the race for territorial delegate to Congress. Democrats discussed Magruder as their candidate. Fifty Nez Perce County men asked him to run, and in a reply written at Elk City on August 21 and printed in the Golden Age on September 5, he let his name be used subject to a party convention. Calling himself "a Democrat (Copperhead or Butternut as the opposition may be pleased to call me)", he stood on a platform of the Union "as it was" and the Constitution "as it is", opposing emancipation and the suspension of habeas corpus. The Republican Golden Age printed his letter beside an editorial predicting that he would be "weighed in the balance and found wanting". Beachy shared his politics: that August he sat on the committee of a Lewiston Democratic meeting that adopted the same creed of "the Constitution as it is and the Union as it was". His name was withdrawn before the party's territorial convention at Lewiston in October, which named him chairman of its central committee while he was away on the trail. The convention nominated John M. Cannady, who lost the election to Wallace, who had resigned the governorship to run. (Note: The official count was 4,404 votes to 3,553, a result Democrats long condemned as fraudulent. A later investigation found that the U.S. marshal, Dolphus Payne, had padded the returns from Fort Laramie.)

== Trip to Virginia City ==
The Montana gold camps in the 1860s

Virginia City, about 1866, where Magruder sold his goods

Bannack, which his pack train passed through; the party camped nearby on the way home

On August 22, 1863, Magruder left Elk City with his chief packer, Charles Allen, L. O. Holt and a pack crew, taking a train of goods east across the Bitterroot Mountains to the new mining camps by way of Bannack, which he reached about mid-September. (Note: The trial testimony does not record the route he took out. Welch and Hamilton's retelling both have him travel the Southern Nez Perce Trail. Francis M. Thompson, a Bannack merchant, recalled in 1913 that in late August 1863 he was guiding a party that included Howard, Lower, Romain and Page from Deer Lodge to Bannack when they overtook "the extensive pack train of Lloyd Magruder". Welch points out that this cannot have happened, since Magruder left Elk City only on August 22, and that Thompson's first account of the trip, published earlier the same year, names only Howard and Romain.) He went on to Virginia City in Alder Gulch, then also part of Idaho Territory, and in about two weeks sold a little more than $12,000 worth of goods for gold dust, with Howard and his companions helping in the store. L. O. Holt, who helped him sell, testified that $8,000 of it was put in two sacks, wrapped in cloth and sealed. Two of the men later convicted, Howard and Romain (an old acquaintance of Magruder from Marysville.), slept in his store there, and Lower was also in town.

== The party ==
The party that set out for Lewiston in early October 1863 was made up of nine men: (Note: Early reports counted Magruder's friend Jules Newburg among the dead. In late November the Sacramento Daily Union reported that he had reached Lewiston "in good condition".)

- Lloyd Magruder, the trip's leader
- Charles Allen, Magruder's chief packer
- Four hired hands who had signed on with Magruder in Virginia City:
  - David Renton, who went by "Doc" Howard
  - Christopher Lower
  - James Romain
  - William Page
- Three travelers bound for Idaho who joined for safety in numbers:
  - William Phillips
  - Horace and Robert Chalmers, brothers

=== Victims ===
Magruder's chief packer Allen joined the party at Beaverhead on its first night. Phillips came from Marysville, where Magruder and Beachy had both lived, and Beachy believed him to be a brother-in-law of the town's Judge Bliss.

The Chalmers brothers were strangers to the rest of the party, who never learned their names; both the indictment and a territorial act of February 1864 listed them only as "two others, names unknown". Later, while awaiting execution, the condemned men said the brothers had been druggists in Boonville, Missouri, who left home in 1861 for Colorado Territory and then the Stinking Water mines. A Salt Lake City acquaintance wrote in March 1864 that they had come from Denver in 1862 and traded cattle in Utah and at Bannack, and gave one brother's name as Thomas. According to the 1903 county history, a notebook found with their remains identified them.

=== Perpetrators ===
Howard, the leader of the three men later convicted, was said to have some knowledge of medicine. Under his real name, David Renton, he had served time in San Quentin for a Sacramento robbery until the governor pardoned him in 1858 on condition that he leave California.

Lower (also given as Lowry or Lowrie) was a blacksmith who had worked on the Mullan Road. Sentenced to San Quentin for grand larceny in 1857, he had escaped in 1860, and a Dalles newspaper reported that he was generally believed to have planned the robbery.

Romain (or Romaine), a gambler and former plasterer from a well-connected New York family, had mined at Boise with Howard earlier in 1863. He was an old acquaintance of Magruder and Beachy from Marysville, where he had helped plaster the office of Magruder's newspaper. Writing in 1890, Bancroft described Romain as "not known to have committed any crimes" and Lower as having "a thriftless but not criminal reputation".

Page, the fourth hired hand, was an older, Cornish-born trapper and former teamster from The Dalles, whom Magruder hired to look after the animals. He would later become the prosecution's main witness.

== Murders ==
Routes of the Magruder party and its killers, October 1863. Dashed lines are approximate.

The party left Virginia City on October 3, 1863, and was joined by Allen and Lower on the road. Near Bannack they camped two nights at the Mormon Ranch while Magruder bought more mules, and when they started west they had 40 animals.

The only account of the trip and the killings is Page's. He confessed in December 1863 and was the main witness at the trial, where the accused called his story false.

According to Page's testimony, on the fifth day out Lower called him aside, and Howard told him that Magruder had a great deal of money and that they meant to have it. Howard and Romain told Page to sleep beside Phillips and not to be frightened by anything he heard. On the afternoon of the sixth day the party met Dolphus Payne, the U.S. marshal for Idaho Territory, riding east. That evening, after crossing a river that Page called the Clearwater (likely the Selway), they climbed a steep trail about six and a half miles and camped under large trees on what Page called "this side of the divide, between Clear Water and Bitter Root rivers". A Sacramento Bee correspondent's summary of Page's partial confession, written at Lewiston in December, put the camp about sixty miles from Elk City on the night of October 11.

The upper Selway River at the Magruder Ranger Station in 1966. The party crossed the river a short way downstream on October 11, 1863.

Page said that Magruder and Lower took the first watch over the stock, which had been turned out on the hill above camp. Lower took an axe, saying he would build a fence across the trail and make a fire, and Magruder told him that one gun would do for the two of them. Page did not see Magruder killed. He testified that the others later sent him up the hill to mend a fire by the trail, telling him "there was where the job was done for Magruder." By his account, around midnight Lower and Howard came back down to camp; Howard and Romain killed the sleeping Chalmers brothers with axes, and Howard shot Allen in his tent with a shotgun as Romain struck Phillips with an axe.

Page said the killers searched the bodies, wrapped them in blankets and a tent, and rolled them into a ravine below the camp, while Lower and Howard disposed of Magruder's body separately. They burned the saddles and gear and hid the metal fittings in a sack behind a log, and Romain gave Page moccasins to wear so that any tracks would be blamed on Indians. Twelve or fourteen of the forty animals had strayed. As they rode away the killers shot all but eight mules and a horse. Page estimated the gold at $11,000 to $12,000, divided among five purses.

== Discovery and pursuit ==
Hill Beachy, the Lewiston hotel keeper who pursued the killers (engraving from Langford's Vigilante Days and Ways)

The four men skirted Elk City. A packer, Timothy Lee, later testified that he met them east of the town on October 15 and recognized Howard. They reached Lewiston at about nine o'clock on the night of October 18. Lower booked four seats on the early stage to Walla Walla at the Luna House under false names, while Page left the animals and gear with a rancher he knew, "Bish" Goodrich.

Hill Beachy, the Luna House proprietor and stage agent, distrusted the muffled man who booked the seats. When the stage left at about one o'clock in the morning of October 19, he followed it with a lantern, recognized all four men, noticed their heavy saddlebags, and warned travelers carrying money not to ride with them. Beachy later told the historian Nathaniel P. Langford that he told Judge Berry that night that Magruder had been murdered, but that the judge would not hold the men without evidence. Langford wrote that Magruder, to mislead robbers, had told his wife he would not leave Bannack for some days, so few in Lewiston yet thought him overdue.

Two arrivals over the next few days turned suspicion into alarm. First, a man named Lew Thompson came in from Magruder's store in Virginia City carrying letters from Magruder to his business partner in Lewiston. (Note: The Daily Alta California does not name the partner. Magruder's partner in the Elk City store was Wesley Wickersham, a Lewiston peace officer.) The letters said that Magruder and Allen would leave five or six days after Thompson, bringing about $20,000 in gold dust. When Thompson heard the four men who had taken the stage described, he recognized them as men he had seen hanging around Magruder's store.

Then, on the evening of October 23, five men well known in Lewiston arrived from the Stinking Water mines and reported that Magruder and Allen had set out five days ahead of them, yet the pair had not arrived. The animals and gear the four men had left behind were brought out and examined. Magruder's partner recognized his saddle, bridle, spurs and saddle blankets, and Caroline Magruder and five of the packers from his regular pack train confirmed them. Allen's horse was identified as well. In Langford's account, it was Jack, a Native American youth who had worked as Magruder's hostler, who recognized the saddle by a repair he had made to the crupper with buckskin.

The fugitives took the stage to Walla Walla and went on down the Columbia, changing their names at every stop. At The Dalles, Howard told an acquaintance that his party had killed three men in a quarrel over a mining claim. They sailed from Portland for San Francisco on the steamer Sierra Nevada on October 25.

=== Beachy sets out ===
Convinced now that Magruder had been robbed and killed, Beachy set out to bring the four men back. He obtained a warrant charging them with the murders of Magruder and Allen, the only member of the party known by name, and was sworn in as a deputy sheriff.

A warrant was not enough to bring fugitives back from another state or colony; that took a requisition from the governor of Idaho Territory. With governor Wallace gone to campaign for Congress, the request went to the acting governor, the territorial secretary William B. Daniels, who hesitated: he was unsure of his authority, and the new territory had no precedent to follow. Beachy brought other Lewiston men to vouch for the urgency. Among them were Wesley Wickersham, Magruder's partner, and Thomas Farrell, sometimes called Tom Pike, who had offered to ride with Beachy. (Note: The requisition and Governor Stanford's delivery order name him Thomas Farrell, as do Langford and later writers who followed him. The Boise News in November 1863, the Luna House register, and Chester Coburn, who managed the Luna House stables, call him Tom Pike. Welch notes that the "Pike" entries in the register are later notes written across the page, apparently not in Beachy's hand. Hamilton concludes that Pike and Farrell were the same man. No source gives his background or later life.)

Langford described Farrell as "a harum-scarum daredevil of the town" and the one man in Lewiston who shared Beachy's suspicions. Beachy also promised to bear the costs himself and to take the blame if no crime had been committed. On October 23 Daniels issued the requisition, on the strength of an affidavit by Wickersham. Addressed to the governors of California and British Columbia, it named the fugitives by their stage aliases and appointed "Hill Beachy and Thomas Farrell" to bring them back.

The Luna House register records that Beachy and Farrell, entered there as "Tom Pike", set out after the fugitives on October 24. They were joined by A. P. Ankeny, a Lewiston merchant. By Langford's account, high water had stopped the steamboats at Wallula, and Ankeny, an experienced river pilot, took Beachy down the Columbia through the Umatilla rapids in a small boat. The pursuers reached Portland after the men had sailed. Beachy set out overland for Yreka, the nearest telegraph office that could reach San Francisco, to wire the city's police chief, but the message arrived after the men had landed. At Shasta he received a telegram from Captain Lees reporting their arrest.

=== Arrest in San Francisco ===
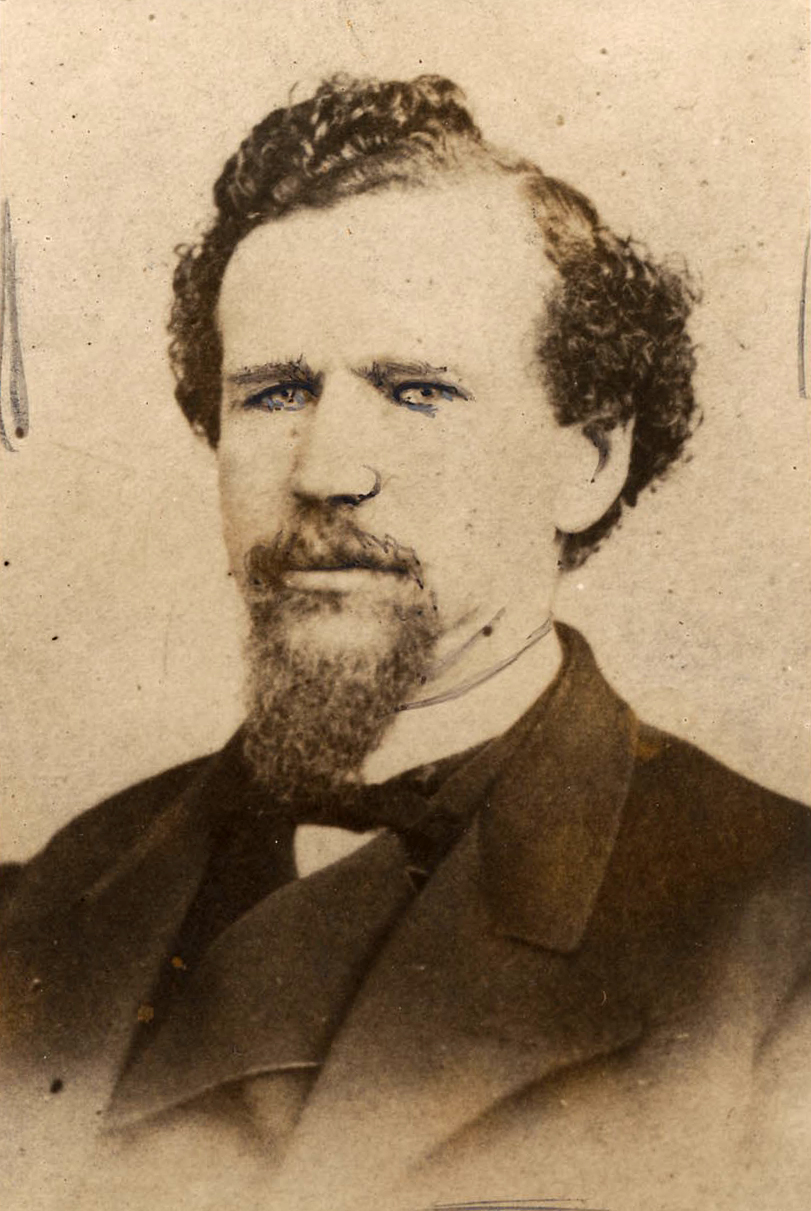
Isaiah W. Lees, the San Francisco police captain who made the arrests (later portrait)

The four fugitives reached San Francisco on the Sierra Nevada before Beachy's telegram did, and had already taken lodgings in the city when it arrived. The case went to Captain Isaiah W. Lees, the city's chief of detectives. His men soon noticed two rough-looking strangers at an obscure house on Dupont Street, near Market, who said they had come from Oregon to recover their health. When a well-dressed young man came to visit them, detectives followed him to the comfortable hotel where he was staying with a friend. The police then moved on all four at once. Lees and Officer Evatt walked into the Dupont Street house, ordered the two strangers, Page and Lower, to raise their hands, and put them in irons. At the same moment Officer Clarke found Romain lying in bed at the Lick House, and Officer Greer brought Howard out of a melodeon. The men had already taken their gold to the U.S. Branch Mint, depositing 413 ounces of dust for coining under the name "G. Clark & Co."

Beachy heard of the arrests at Shasta and went on by way of Sacramento. On November 2 California governor Leland Stanford signed an order delivering the men "into the custody of Hill Beachy and Thomas Farrell", and Beachy reached San Francisco the same day. The prisoners fought their return. Their lawyers, McNeil and Alexander Campbell, sought their release on a writ of habeas corpus, arguing that the governor of a territory had no power to requisition fugitives from a state. They also pointed out that no body had been found and that no witness had placed the four men in Magruder's party, and Beachy had to hire a lawyer of his own. To satisfy the courts, Beachy gave his solemn promise that the prisoners would be protected from lynching and given a fair trial in Idaho. Petitions in the district court, the county court and the Supreme Court of California all failed, and the prisoners were turned over to Beachy about November 9 or 10.

In jail, meanwhile, the four agreed on a false story for Page to tell if he were questioned. Page later testified that the others made him hold up his hand ten times and swear never to flinch from it. Howard tried, and failed, to bribe his way out of jail. Page later said that Lees and Campbell were to receive all but $1,000 of the gold if the men went free; the San Francisco police commissioners investigated the charge against Lees and declared it "wholly untrue".

=== Return to Lewiston ===
The prisoners left San Francisco on the steamer Pacific on November 18. Crowds met them at The Dalles, and they reached Lewiston under military escort on December 1, 1863. Accounts of the arrival differ. The Lewiston Golden Age reported at the time that Beachy's party came by stage, and a few days later told its readers, "We have not heard a single expression that would tend to excite mob violence." Later histories describe a confrontation. According to Bancroft, a vigilance committee formed in Lewiston on November 8 met the party and demanded the prisoners, and Beachy, who had promised them an impartial trial, persuaded the people to await the action of the law. In Langford's telling, Beachy asked everyone who would support a trial to cross to the other side of the street, and the whole crowd crossed.

The prisoners were held first in upstairs rooms of the Luna House, with Page kept apart, and later at Fort Lapwai. Page soon confessed, and the other three waived a preliminary examination. Beachy later told Langford that he obtained the confession with a ruse: the other three prisoners were led away one at a time, and Page was shown a room hung with nooses and told that his companions had confessed, before being offered the chance to testify for the territory. According to the historian Alvin M. Josephy Jr., Page was told that he would not be tried if he turned state's evidence, and the district court docket shows the charges against him dropped before the grand jury met.

== Trial ==
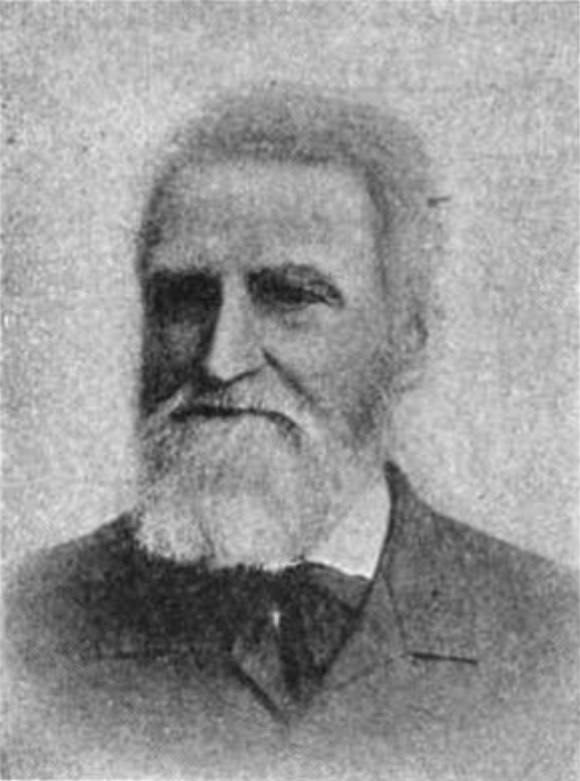
Judge Samuel C. Parks, who presided at the trial

The new territory had no working courts when the prisoners arrived; when the requisition was sent, Justice Alleck C. Smith certified that the court had not yet adopted a seal. The first territorial legislature, meeting at Lewiston in December 1863, set up judicial districts and ordered a special court term at Lewiston for the first Monday of January 1864. The grand jury was summoned under the law of Washington Territory. Judge Samuel C. Parks of the Second District presided in place of the absent First District judge, Alleck C. Smith.

The defense challenged the grand jury summons and argued that Nez Perce County did not legally exist because it lay within the Nez Perce Indian Reservation. The 1855 treaty of Camp Stevens had reserved a large tract to the Nez Perce, and a new treaty negotiated at Lapwai in June 1863 ceded most of it to the United States. The court ordered a new grand jury summons but rejected the other objections. The grand jury indicted the three men for first-degree murder, and all three pleaded not guilty. The indictment, returned on January 7, named them as David Howard, James Romain and Francis Creely; at the arraignment three days later the defendants gave their names as David Renton, James Romain and Christopher Lower. (Note: Welch suggests that "Creely" was a name Lower used, and possibly his real one. Hamilton took Creely to be a separate man, a Lewiston packer whose name was dropped before the trial. He found no other mention of Creely in connection with the case, but a Frank Creeley was still living in Lewiston in 1875, when the Northerner reported that he had "bought a dray and gone into the draying business".)

More than a hundred men were examined before a jury was seated on January 20, with George Sandy as foreman. (Note: The Golden Age report of the trial says the court house was densely packed each day. According to Defenbach (1933), the trial was held in Sandy's store at D and Second streets.) E. F. Gray prosecuted for the territory, assisted by Milton Kelly and W. C. Rheem. (Note: The Golden Age and the Washington Statesman print the name as Rheem; the Boise News gives Rheam, and Defenbach and Hamilton give Rheems.) J. W. Anderson and W. W. Thayer, later governor of Oregon, defended the accused without pay. Witnesses from Virginia City and Bannack placed the defendants around Magruder's store, L. O. Holt described the sale of the goods, and Lewiston's night watchman and Beachy described the men's departure on the stage. Page was the main witness. He identified the axe, Allen's shotgun and the pistols, which were shown in court. The defense called several witnesses to impeach Page's testimony, without success. The Golden Age called it the first session of the district court ever held in the territory, and the first case tried. The court reporter, Charles Frush, kept a transcript in pencil, now held at the Nez Perce County Courthouse.

On January 23 the jury found all three guilty on its first ballot. At sentencing on January 26 each denied guilt. Howard called Page "a bad man" whose story was mostly untrue, and said he would rather die a convicted felon than stand in Page's place. Parks sentenced them to hang on March 4, telling them:

You burned the blood of Magruder that it might not reveal your guilt; but, like the blood of Abel, it cried to God against you, and the cry was heard and answered.

— Judge Samuel C. Parks, January 26, 1864

== Execution ==
On March 3, Lower agreed to sit for a photographer named Brown and then smashed the camera. The next day, March 4, 1864, the three men were hanged together at Lewiston shortly after noon, on a scaffold at the foot of what became the Poe grade, now the Thirteenth Street grade, near the spot where Judge Poe's house later stood. Several hundred people watched, many of them Nez Perce, from the hillside above. Infantry from Fort Lapwai formed a square around the scaffold, and Beachy attended as a deputy U.S. marshal. Father Brouillet, a Catholic priest from Walla Walla, was with the prisoners on the scaffold. Each again declared his innocence. Romain called the proceedings "not a court, but a mob" and said that Page was guilty of the murder. Lower said that he could clear the other two only by implicating seven other men, one of them "dearer to him than life", and he accused Page of planning and carrying out the murders. His last words were reported as "Launch your boat; she is nothing but an old mud scow anyhow." The drop fell at 12:28; Lower and Romain died of broken necks, and Renton strangled. A letter Lower left to be opened after his death was found to be "not fit for publication", full of "vulgar blasphemy" about the people of Lewiston.

== Recovery of the remains ==
The murder site and the Southern Nez Perce Trail, with the camps of the 1864 recovery party.

On May 29, 1864, after the snow had melted, a search party guided by Page, including Beachy and L. O. Holt, left Elk City to find the bodies. Its report, printed in the Golden Age on June 11, was signed by seven men, one of whom had joined on the way. On June 1 they reached the site and found the remains, clothing and camp gear where Page had said, including the sack of burned buckles and rings, the guns he had thrown away, and the slaughtered animals. Magruder had been killed nearly half a mile from the others, and the gun Beachy had lent him was found loaded but with its percussion caps removed. One of the party scratched a notice on a board and nailed it to a tree to mark the spot. The remains were taken to Lewiston, where they were put on view. A correspondent at Elk City counted seventeen axe cuts on the recovered portion of Magruder's skull and wrote that the finds had changed public opinion, which had partly doubted Page. According to Langford, the remains were buried in the cemetery at Lewiston. According to a granddaughter, Beachy brought Magruder's skull back to his widow, and when she died at Hillsboro, Oregon, in 1900 it was buried with her at her request.

== Aftermath ==
The prisoners had signed the mint certificate over to their San Francisco attorney, and a lawsuit followed before it was dropped. Beachy, appointed administrator of Magruder's estate, pressed the claim, and in April 1864 the mint paid $7,388 to his attorney, acting under Caroline Magruder's power of attorney. The territorial legislature had already voted Beachy $6,244 for "money expended, and time employed in the pursuit, and arrest and detention" of the three men, in an act approved February 2, 1864. Caroline Magruder married Hiram Burt about 1866 and lived at Hillsboro, Oregon, until her death in 1900. A widow's pension she sought in 1881 on Magruder's Mexican War service was refused because she had remarried.

Page was shot and killed in Lewiston on December 25, 1866, by Albert Igo, in a house kept by Eliza Wilson. Early that morning Page and a companion had broken in and beaten Igo with a pistol; a coroner's jury held Igo for the killing. (Note: Newspapers reported that Igo was indicted for murder in 1867, escaped from jail and was recaptured in 1868. Welch, who used the coroner's inquest, gives Christmas Day 1866. Hamilton dates the killing to Christmas 1865 and writes that the authorities considered it self-defense and never charged Igo, and Josephy also says no effort was made to prosecute him.)

Beachy sold the Luna House in November 1864 and moved to the Owyhee mines, where he ran stage lines to Nevada and California. He later managed the Lick House in San Francisco, and died there in May 1875 after a stroke.

== Legacy ==
=== Legal questions ===
The case raised several legal questions. In San Francisco the prisoners' lawyers challenged a territorial governor's power to requisition fugitives from a state, and at Lewiston the defense argued that the county itself did not legally exist. A more basic problem went unnoticed at the time. Because Idaho Territory had been assembled from parts of four other territories, it inherited no law code from any of them, and it had no criminal code from its creation in March 1863 until the legislature adopted the English common law on January 4, 1864, after the murders. The defense argued that the men were charged under laws that had not existed when the crime was committed, and appealed on those grounds after the verdict. In 1866 the territorial supreme court ruled that a man named Williams, accused of an armed robbery committed in 1863, could not be tried. After a re-enactment of the trial at Lewiston in 1961, two justices of the Idaho Supreme Court cited the Williams case in an informal opinion that the three men had been "unlawfully hung". In 1890 the historian Hubert Howe Bancroft noted that despite the many capital crimes committed in Idaho Territory's first two years, the Magruder murderers were the only men hanged there by the legally constituted authorities.

=== Vigilance committees ===
Bancroft wrote that the massacre "alarmed the whole country" and did more to prompt the formation of vigilance committees than anything that had happened west of the Rocky Mountains up to that time. The Lewiston committee disbanded in April 1864, satisfied that the courts would act. East of the mountains, Plummer's biographers R. E. Mather and F. E. Boswell write that the news that Magruder's train had not arrived helped prompt the vigilance committee formed at Virginia City in December 1863. The lawyer and historian Mark C. Dillon counts the murders among the trail crimes that drove the Montana camps toward vigilantism, though the killers themselves were tried in court rather than by vigilantes. Welch, who read the transcript, judged it "probably as fair a trial as could be hoped for"; Allen judges the arrest, trial and conviction "remarkably fair under the circumstances", and suggests that had Plummer conducted himself as Beachy did, the Montana camps might not have resorted to vigilante justice. In a later installment of his memoir, the Bannack merchant Francis M. Thompson recalled that the party he guided to Bannack in August 1863, with Howard, Lower, Romain and Page, also included Bob Zachary, Erastus "Red" Yager, John Wagner and Steve Marshland, all hanged by the Montana vigilantes in early 1864. Welch notes that his first account named only Howard and Romain, and that every name on the longer list appears in Dimsdale.

=== Page's role ===
Page's account was the prosecution's whole case, and his part in the crime has been disputed. At the trial the defense called witnesses to impeach him, and on the scaffold Romain and Lower both accused him, Lower saying that Page had planned and carried out the murders. Thompson's later recollection places Page with Howard's party from August 1863, and Allen suggests he may have been a more active accomplice than he admitted. Hamilton reports the view that Page "was in on the deal all along". Welch, who examined his testimony in detail, concludes that it is "probably very close to being a true account" of the killings, but that Page was "less than honest about his motives and perhaps his culpability". She finds him "neither as vile as Bancroft believed, nor as honest as later writers" made him, and not the man to have planned the crime. Dillon notes that the noose ruse used to obtain his confession would be treated today as coercion, and the confession excluded from evidence. Welch doubts the ruse took place. It appears in only four of the seventeen accounts she compared, and she finds more believable Sheriff James Fisk's recollection that Page was won over with kind words and the promise of his life.

=== Accounts and legends ===
In The Vigilantes of Montana (1866), Dimsdale wrote that Plummer and his road agents met in Alder Gulch and planned the murders, and that Cyrus Skinner dismissed an objection to killing the whole party with "dead men tell no tales". Dimsdale also printed the confession of Erastus "Red" Yager, which listed Howard, Lowry, Page and Romaine among Plummer's road agents; Langford's version of the same list omits them. Michael Leeson's History of Montana (1885) went further, having Plummer order the four men to offer their services to Magruder, and listed Hill Beachy among the members of the Alder Gulch vigilance committee, though Beachy never lived in Montana. Bancroft repeated the claim, attributing it to Dimsdale. Mather and Boswell note that Page's trial testimony, as printed in 1864, makes no mention of Plummer or a gang. Hamilton, who used the Plummer plot in his 1994 retelling, called it surmise. Allen points out that Plummer had warned Thompson that Howard's party were "cut-throats and robbers", which he would hardly have done had they been his accomplices, and that Skinner's only known contact with the killers was serving them a drink in his saloon. He finds Welch's conclusion that Plummer had no part in the murders persuasive. Welch adds that the killers fled west to Lewiston, where three of them were known, rather than back to Plummer, and that Dimsdale's charge against Skinner may rest on a single mention of "Skinner's house" in Page's testimony.

Langford's two chapters on the case (1890) rest largely on what Beachy told him, by Langford's account a few months after the death of Beachy's wife in 1867. Welch doubts that the interview took place as described and judges that Langford's account "has more in common with legend than history"; Mather and Boswell point out that Langford inflated the amount stolen.

Book-length accounts include Julia Conway Welch's The Magruder Murders: Coping with Violence on the Idaho Frontier (1991) and Ladd Hamilton's This Bloody Deed (1994). Welch's is a history drawn from the trial transcript, newspapers and family papers, which sets out to separate the documented record from the legends that grew around it. Hamilton's book is a retelling in narrative form, which Allen describes as a "footnoted historical novel", and Hamilton is explicit about where it departs from the record. In an author's note he says that all the major characters and events are real, but that where no record survives he set down what he thought probably happened. He names the passages he made up for the story, among them Cyrus Skinner's pursuit of the killers, a stop at Fort Lapwai, everything aboard the steamer that carried Beachy and his prisoners north, and the Plummer plot itself, which he calls surmise. He also identifies the minor characters he invented, separates the historical figures in a list of "actual personages", quotes people directly only where their exact words are on record, mostly in the trial transcript, and gives his sources in endnotes.

Eddie Quillan played Hill Beachy in a 1961 episode of Death Valley Days.

==== Beachy's dream ====
The best-known legend of the case is that Beachy foresaw the murder in a dream. The story was already in print by the time of his death in 1875, when newspapers reported that he had dreamed of Magruder's murder before it happened.

Langford, who heard it from Beachy, gave the fullest version. On the night before Magruder left Lewiston for Bannack, Beachy dreamed that he saw Lower kill Magruder with an axe. He told his wife the next morning. She wanted to warn Magruder, but Beachy, thinking it would not stop the trip and would only make him a laughingstock, kept it to himself, and was relieved weeks later when word came that Magruder had reached Bannack safely. In Langford's account, when Beachy came home in the early hours of October 19, after watching the four men leave on his stage, he told her, "You remember my dream about Lloyd Magruder? I fear it has all come true."

Later tellings vary. Defenbach (1933) has Beachy see "the body of his murdered friend lying beside a mountain trail". In Josephy's 1983 version, Beachy has the dream after noticing three suspicious strangers in Lewiston, and later recognizes one of them, Lower, as the man from the dream when he comes to buy stage tickets. Chester Coburn and James Witt, who knew Beachy, later said that he had described the dream to them after the murder. Welch finds the dream in ten of the seventeen accounts she compared, but not in either newspaper report of the hanging, and notes that Coburn's own account, given to the 1903 county history, has Beachy reasoning from the men's behavior instead. She considers the origin of the story unknown, perhaps Beachy's own retelling.

The dream appears in later histories, and Josephy still told it as fact in 1983. The historian Carole Simon-Smolinski traces its spread as regional folklore mainly to Robert G. Bailey's River of No Return (1935) and Alfreda Elsensohn's Pioneer Days in Idaho County (1951), which drew on the recollections of old-timers without separating them from the documented record.

=== Place names and markers ===
The original marker from the murder site, a painted plate the pine tree had grown around, cut out after the tree fell. It is now in the collection of the Nez Perce County Historical Society in Lewiston.

Magruder Mountain is named for Lloyd Magruder. The Magruder Corridor, the unpaved Forest Road 468 that follows the old trail across Nez Perce Pass, and the Magruder Ranger Station also bear his name. The first marker at the site was a sign on a large yellow pine. When the tree blew down about 1931, the old sign went to the museum of the Northern Idaho College of Education in Lewiston, and a forest ranger put up a new one nearby. The Forest Service marks the traditional murder site in the Bitterroot National Forest with a sign and a short trail from the road, though Hamilton doubted that the marked spot matches Page's testimony.
