= Justice Ilsley =

Justice Ilsley may refer to:

- Harry P. Ilsley (1884–1953), justice of the Wyoming Supreme Court
- James Lorimer Ilsley (1894–1967), chief justice of the Nova Scotia Supreme Court
