= Groesbeck =

Groesbeck, as a person, may refer to:

- Alex J. Groesbeck (1873–1953), American governor of Michigan (1921-1927)
- Herman V.S. Groesbeck (1849–1929), Chief Justice of the Wyoming Supreme Court
- Robert A. Groesbeck, American mayor of Henderson, Nevada (1993-1997)
- William S. Groesbeck (1815–1897), American U.S. Representative of Ohio

Groesbeck, as a place, may refer to:

- Groesbeck, Ohio, an unincorporated census-designated place in Hamilton County, Ohio, United States
- Groesbeck, Texas, a city in Limestone County, Texas, United States

== See also ==
- Groesbeek
