= Harnsberger =

Hansberger is a surname. Notable people with the surname include:

- Daniel Harnsberger, a.k.a. Daniel Richards (born 1980), American wrestler
- Harry Harnsberger (1889–1975), American judge
