= Justice Kimball =

Justice Kimball may refer to:

- Catherine D. Kimball (born 1945), chief justice of the Louisiana Supreme Court
- Ralph Kimball (judge) (1878–1959), associate justice of the Wyoming Supreme Court

== See also ==
- Judge Kimball (disambiguation)
