= Tippets =

Tippets is a surname. Notable people with the surname include:

- Dennis Tippets (born 1938), American politician
- John Tippets (born 1952), American politician

== See also ==
- Tippett
