= Samuel T. Corn =

American judge (1840–1925)

Samuel T. Corn (October 8, 1840 – January 28, 1925) was an American jurist who served as a justice of the Territorial Wyoming Supreme Court from April 14, 1886, to June 21, 1890, and on the Wyoming Supreme Court from September 22, 1894, to January 7, 1895, and again from January 4, 1897, to January 2, 1905.

Corn was born in Jessamine County, Kentucky to Ellis and Emily Corn. His wife was Emily Thompson, also a native of the Kentucky from one of the oldest families of the county, in which she was born. She died in 1863.

Corn attended Princeton College from 1858 for two years before graduating. He studied law in Nicholasville, Kentucky under the direction of W. R. Welchunder, a leading lawyer in the area. He was admitted to the bar in 1863 and worked as a lawyer in southern Illinois. In 1872 he was elected state's attorney for two terms to 1880. President Grover Cleveland appointed him as associate justice of the Supreme Court of Wyoming Territory in 1886. He served four years until when he retired and resumed the active practice of law at Evanston, Wyo. where he remained until 1896, In 1894 Governor John Eugene Osborne appointed Corn to fill Gibson Clark's vacancy from 1894 to 1895. Corn was elected associate justice in 1896 and served on the court until January 1905. He moved to Utah in 1906 and died in Ogden, Utah January 28, 1925.

Political offices
| Preceded by Samuel C. Parks; Gibson Clark; Herman V. S. Groesbeck | Justice of the Wyoming Supreme Court; 1886–1890; 1894–1895; 1897–1905 | Succeeded by Seat abolished Charles N. Potter; Cyrus Beard |
