= Justice Merrell =

Justice Merrell may refer to:

- Homer Merrell (1845–1916), justice of the Wyoming Supreme Court
- Stanley W. Merrell (1876–1921), justice of the Ohio Supreme Court

== See also ==
- Justice Merrill (disambiguation)
