= John H. Howe =

John H. Howe may refer to:

- John H. Howe (architect) (1913–1997), American architect
- John H. Howe (judge) (1822–1873), American jurist
