= Justice Merrill =

Justice Merrill may refer to:

- Charles Merton Merrill (1907–1996), associate justice and chief justice of the Nevada Supreme Court
- Edward F. Merrill (1883–1962), associate justice of the Maine Supreme Judicial Court
- Pelham J. Merrill (1907–1991), associate justice of the Alabama Supreme Court

== See also ==
- Justice Merrell (disambiguation)
