= Clyde Pharr =

American classics professor (1883–1972)

Clyde Pharr (17 February 1883 – 31 December 1972) was an American classics professor at Ohio Wesleyan University, Southwestern Presbyterian University (now Rhodes College), Vanderbilt University (where he was head of the classics department for many years), and, finally, at the University of Texas at Austin.

== Early life ==
Pharr was born in Saltillo, Texas, the son of Samuel Milton Pharr and Josephine Fleming Pharr. He attended Saltillo High School and earned B.S. and A.B. degrees from East Texas Normal College (now Texas A&M University-Commerce) in 1903 and 1905, respectively. He continued his education at Yale University, earning another A.B. (with Honors and election to Phi Beta Kappa) there in 1906. He was named an Abernathy Fellow at Yale, where he obtained his Ph.D. in 1910. From 1910–12, he had a fellowship at the American Institute of Archaeology in Athens, and while abroad he studied at the University of Berlin and other European universities.

== Career ==
Pharr's first faculty appointment was as Assistant Professor of Latin and Greek at Ohio Wesleyan University where he served from 1912–17. From 1917–18 he was the legal advisor to a draft board; immediately after that he returned to academia at Southwestern Presbyterian University where he taught until 1924, with a break in the 1920–21 academic year to be an American Field Service Fellow at the University of Paris. He left Southwestern Presbyterian University in 1924 to become an associate professor at Vanderbilt. Pharr was on the Vanderbilt faculty from 1924–50 and was a full professor and head of the Department of Classics from 1928–50. Pharr developed a national reputation through his textbooks for Greek and Latin, some of which remain in print. Later, Pharr turned his attention to Roman law and was general editor of the first translation of the Codex Theodosianus into English. He married classicist Mary Brown in 1945. Brown was an assistant professor of Latin at Converse College, S.C. She became a noted classical scholar, and assistant editor of the Theodosian Code project. In 1950, Clyde and Mary left Vanderbilt for the University of Texas at Austin where he was a visiting professor from 1950-1953, Research Professor of Roman Law from 1953-1966, and Professor Emeritus of Classical Languages from 1966-1972.

Although Pharr's work in translating the Theodosian Code involved frequent disputes with his associate editor, Theresa Sherrer Davidson, the finished product was very favorably received upon its publication in 1952 and has been thought likely to be the only full translation into English ever made of this important document. Pharr had intended to oversee translation into English of "the entire body of Roman law", including the Codex Justinianus (Justinian Code), using a draft by Justice Fred H. Blume as its basis, but various problems prevented him from bringing this project to fruition. When Pharr died in 1972 only the Codex Theodosianus translation and a volume of pre-Theodosian laws had been published. However, Pharr's graduate student William Sims Thurman did create for his dissertation an English translation of Justinian's Thirteen Edicts from the Greek.

Clyde Pharr died in an Austin hospital on December 31, 1972, one week after his wife Mary Brown Pharr passed away.

== Writings ==
Algernon Sidney, 6 POTTER’S AMERICAN MONTHLY 333-341 (May 1876).

Granada and the Alhambra, 1 (new series), 27 (old series) LIPPINCOTT’S MAG. OF POPULAR LITERATURE & SCI. 425-435 (May 1881).

Cordova, 2 (n.s.), 28 (o.s.) LIPPINCOTT’S MAG. POPULAR LITERATURE & SCI. 334-344 (Oct. 1881).

Seville, 3 (n.s.), 29 (o.s.) LIPPINCOTT’S MAG. POPULAR LITERATURE & SCI. 9-20 (Jan. 1882).

Pictures of Andalusia, 18 POTTER’S AM. MONTHLY 121-131 (Feb. 1882).

Tunis and Carthage (part 1), 18 POTTER’S AM. MONTHLY 481-491 (May 1882).

Tunis and Carthage (part 2), 18 POTTER’S AM. MONTHLY 601-610 (June 1882).

Toledo, 3 (n.s.), 29 (o.s.) LIPPINCOTT’S 529-540 (June 1882).

Sargossa, 5 (n.s.), 31 (o.s.) LIPPINCOTT’S 113-122 (Jan. 1883).

A National Pastime, 3 THE CONTINENT 387-396 (March 28, 1883).

THROUGH SPAIN: A NARRATIVE OF TRAVEL AND ADVENTURE IN THE PENINSULA. (Lippincott 1886; photo reprint British Library Historical Print editions 2011).

HISTORY OF THE MOORISH EMPIRE IN EUROPE (Lippincott 1904; photo reprint AMS Press 1977) (3 vols.).

Foreign Legislation, Jurisprudence and Bibliography—Spain, 1 ANN. BULL. COMP. L. BUREAU A.B.A. 64-65 (1908).

Foreign Legislation, Jurisprudence and Bibliography—Spain, 2 ANN. BULL. COMP. L. BUREAU A.B.A. 144-145, 152-153 (1909).

Spanish Jurisprudence Comparatively Considered, 2 ANN. BULL. COMP. L. BUREAU A.B.A. 14-25 (1909).

Spanish Criminal Law Compared with that Branch of Anglo-Saxon Jurisprudence, 3 ANN. BUL. COMP. L. BUREAU A.B.A. 62-80 (1910).

Foreign Legislation, Jurisprudence and Bibliography—Spain, 3 ANN. BULL. COMP. L. BUREAU A.B.A. 201-203 (1910).

Foreign Legislation, Jurisprudence and Bibliography—Spain, 4 ANN. BULL. COMP. L. BUREAU A.B.A. 167-168 (1911).

Foreign Legislation, Jurisprudence and Bibliography—Spain, 5 ANN. BULL. COMP. L. BUREAU A.B.A. 160-161 (1912).

Foreign Legislation, Jurisprudence and Bibliography—Spain, 6 ANN. BULL. COMP. L. BUREAU A.B.A. 112-114 (1913).

Foreign Legislation, Jurisprudence and Bibliography—Spain, 7 ANN. BULL. COMP. L. BUREAU A.B.A. 185-186 (1914).

THE VISIGOTHIC CODE (FORUM JUDICUM). (Boston Book Co. 1910; photo reprint Rothman 1982.)

THE LAWS OF ANCIENT CASTILLE and THE CRIMINAL CODE OF SPAIN (unpublished manuscripts, noted in 38 ANN. REP. A.B.A. 883 (1915).

European Literature and Legislation—Spain, 1 A.B.A.J. 164-166 (1915).

European Literature and Legislation—Spain, 2 A.B.A.J. 275-277 (1916).

European Literature and Legislation—Spain, 3 A.B.A.J. 265-269 (1917).

European Literature and Legislation—Spain, 4 A.B.A.J. 207-208 (1918).

Practice in the Courts of Ancient Rome, 24 CASE & COMMENT 687-699 (1918).

European Literature and Legislation—Spain, 5 A.B.A.J. 301-304 (1919).

European Literature and Legislation—Spain, 6 A.B.A.J. 337-340 (1920).

European Literature and Legislation—Spain, 7 A.B.A.J. 200 (1921).

European Literature and Legislation—Spain, 8 A.B.A.J. 248-249 (1922).

European Literature and Legislation—Spain, 9 A.B.A.J. 262 (1923).

European Literature and Legislation—Spain, 10 A.B.A.J. 284-285 (1924).

European Literature and Legislation—Spain, 11 A.B.A.J. 262-263 (1925).

European Literature and Legislation—Spain, 12 A.B.A.J. 339-340 (1926).

European Literature and Legislation—Spain, 13 A.B.A.J. 230-231 (1927).

LAS SIETE PARTIDAS (Commerce Clearing House & Comparative Law Bureau, Am. Bar. Assoc. 1931; modified reprint U. Penn. Press 2001)(5 vols.)).

THE CIVIL LAW (Central Trust Co. 1931 (17 vols.); photo reprint AMS Press 1973 (7 vols.); photo reprint Law Book Exchange (2001)(7 vols.)).
