= Robert R. Rose Jr. =

American judge (1915–1997)

Justice of Wyoming Supreme Court
- In office March 15, 1975 – November 1, 1985
- Appointed by: Edgar J. Herschler

Personal details
- Born: November 1, 1915 Evanston, Illinois, U.S.
- Died: June 1997

Robert R. Rose Jr. (November 1, 1915 – June 1997) was an American jurist who served as a justice of the Wyoming Supreme Court from March 15, 1975, to November 1, 1985.

Rose was born in Evanston, Illinois, in 1915 to Robert R. and Eleanor Rose. In 1941, he received a law degree from the University of Wyoming and entered private practice in Casper, Wyoming. He served as mayor of Casper in 1949 and 1950 and was elected to a term in the Wyoming House of Representatives in 1949. He ran for a seat in the 1952 United States House of Representatives elections, but was defeated by the incumbent, William H. Harrison. Rose was appointed to the Wyoming Supreme Court by Governor Edgar J. Herschler on March 15, 1975, and retired on November 1, 1985. Afterwards he maintained a law practice in Cheyenne in association with the Jackson law firm of Spence, Moriarity and Schuster. He also served on the faculty of the University of Wyoming College of Law. In 1993, he helped to establish the Trial Lawyers College.

Political offices
Preceded by Leonard McEwan	Justice of the Wyoming Supreme Court; 1975–1985	Succeeded by Walter Urbigkit
