= William A. Riner =

American judge (1878–1955)

William Addison Riner (June 26, 1878 – November 20, 1955) was a justice of the Wyoming Supreme Court from January 10, 1928, until his death on November 20, 1955.

Born in Greene, Iowa, Riner practiced law in Michigan for less than a year before moving to Cheyenne, Wyoming in 1902. He was an active Republican Party member, and served as a city attorney, United States District Attorney, and district court judge. Riner was appointed to the Wyoming Supreme Court on January 10, 1928, by Governor Frank C. Emerson, to fill the vacancy caused by the death of Justice Charles N. Potter. Riner was then elected to the court, and re-elected in succeeding years, serving until his death.

Governor Milward Simpson appointed Glenn Parker to the Wyoming Supreme Court in 1955 to fill the vacancy caused by Chief Justice Riner's death.

Political offices
Preceded by Charles N. Potter	Justice of the Wyoming Supreme Court; 1928–1955	Succeeded by Glenn Parker
