= Idaho Statesman =

Triweekly newspaper in Boise, Idaho, United States

Coordinates: 43.616°N 116.253°W

- Type: Triweekly newspaper
- Format: Broadsheet
- Owner(s): The McClatchy Company (since 2006)
- Founder: James S. Reynolds
- Publisher: Rusty Dodge
- Editor: Chadd Cripe
- Founded: 1864; 162 years ago (as Idaho Tri-Weekly Statesman)
- Headquarters: 10400 Overland Road PMB 385; Boise, Idaho, U.S.
- Circulation: 28,048 Daily; 46,897 Sunday (as of 2020)
- ISSN: 2688-8831 (print); 2688-884X (web)
- OCLC number: 50144804
- Website: idahostatesman.com

The Idaho Statesman is a newspaper of Boise, Idaho, in the western United States. It is owned by The McClatchy Company.

== History ==
On July 26, 1864, James S. Reynolds published the first edition of the Idaho Tri-Weekly Statesman in Boise, Idaho. It began publication from a log cabin on the future site of the Boise City Hall. In January 1872, Reynolds sold the paper, "lock, stock and barrel," to Judge Milton Kelly. In January 1888, the paper expanded to a daily and was renamed to the Idaho Daily Statesman.

Kelly's 17-year run ended in May 1889 when he sold the Statesman to Joseph Perrault, Calvin Cobb and R. Wildman. John R. French was named editor. Later Cobb and his brother-in-law, Jack Lyon, bought out the others. Calvin Cobb lost his wife in October 1917, and he died in November 1928. At that time the Statesman was inherited by his daughter Margaret Cobb Ailshie. As the paper's first female publisher, "Ailshie insisted on a lively editorial policy, deploring 'a dull newspaper.'"

Cobb Ailshie published the Statesman until her death in August 1959. General manager James Brown then assumed control of the paper. In October 1963, the Statesman was sold to Federated Publications, a chain that owned six other papers in Washington, Indiana and Michigan. At that time the Statesman had a Sunday circulation of 47,000. After the sale, John A. Scott was named publisher. Federated Publications merged with Gannett Co in June 1971.

In the early morning of March 21, 2004, the Statesman's pressroom caught on fire, which left two of the newspaper's nine press units severely damaged and two units partially destroyed. Newspapers from other cities chipped in and helped deliver papers to Boise. On August 3, 2005, Gannett agreed to sell the Statesman to Knight Ridder along with The Bellingham Herald and The Olympian. A year later McClatchy bought Knight Ridder.

In 2008, the Statesman entered into a partnership with the Idaho Press-Tribune to print the paper at its facility in Nampa, Idaho. In March 2018, printing was moved to a facility operated by the Times-News in Twin Falls, Idaho. In October 2019, the paper announced it will cut its Saturday edition.

Starting October 2023, the paper decreased its print edition days to three a week (Wednesdays, Fridays and Sundays). It also switched from carrier to postal delivery.

In September 2026, McClatchy laid off 13 of the paper’s journalists, including three editors.

== Notable people ==
- E. L. "Shorty" Fuller was a photographer for the Statesman from 1937 to 1942. An archive of his work is found in the Idaho State Historical Society containing 3,000 of his negatives, prints and scrapbooks.
- Milton Kelly, owner and editor of the Statesman from 1871 to 1889
- Marjorie Paxson, journalist, editor and publisher
