= William Ware Peck =

American judge (1821–1897)

William Ware Peck (February 17, 1821 – July 18, 1897) was an American jurist who served as a justice of the Territorial Wyoming Supreme Court from December 14, 1877, to January 11, 1882.

Born in Burlington, Vermont, he graduated from the University of Vermont in 1841, and received an LL.B. from Harvard University in 1844.

He started his career in law in Burlington but moved to New York City and became the law partner of John Van Buren, son of President Martin Van Buren.

President Rutherford B. Hayes nominated William W. Peck as an associate justice of the Wyoming Supreme Court, and the United States Senate confirmed his appointment on December 14, 1877. He resigned after a single term due to an eye cataract and was succeeded by fellow Vermont native Samuel C. Parks. Despite his decreasing eyesight Peck continued working in Wyoming, where he practiced law and served as a special United States Attorney until 1893. He later moved to New York City to live with his son, at which point he retired from legal practice. His eyesight was eventually restored through surgery performed by his nephew, Dr. Edward Peck. William W. Peck died in Manhattan, New York City, on July 19, 1897.

Political offices
Preceded by Edward A. Thomas	Justice of the Territorial Wyoming Supreme Court; 1877–1882	Succeeded by Samuel C. Parks
