= Leonard McEwan =

American judge (1925–2008)

Leonard A. McEwan

Chief Justice of the Wyoming Supreme Court
- In office 1968–1974

Judge of the Fourth Judicial District Court of Wyoming (Sheridan and Johnson counties)
- In office 1974–1985

Personal details
- Born: February 17, 1925 Great Falls, Montana, U.S.
- Died: January 24, 2008 (aged 82) Sheridan, Wyoming, U.S.
- Party: Democratic
- Spouse(s): (1) Cameon Wolfe McEwan (1953–1977, deceased), (2) Mary Amschel McEwan (1988–2008, deceased)
- Children: Stepsons Edward T. Amschel, Peter Amschel, and Stephen J. Amschel
- Education: University of Wyoming (BS); University of Wyoming College of Law (JD)
- Profession: Attorney

Leonard A. McEwan (February 17, 1925 – January 24, 2008) was an American jurist who served as chief justice of the Wyoming Supreme Court.

McEwan served in the United States Army Air Corps during World War II. He received a B.S. in business and accounting from the University of Wyoming in 1955, followed by a Juris Doctor degree from the UW College of Law in 1957.

In January 1975, McEwan stepped down as Chief Justice to become a judge of the Wyoming Fourth Judicial District, following the ouster of judge John P. Ilsley in a no-confidence vote the previous November.

Political offices
Preceded by Harry Harnsberger	Justice of the Wyoming Supreme Court; 1968–1975	Succeeded by Robert R. Rose Jr.
