= W. C. Whitson =

American judge (1840–1875)

Associate Justice of the Idaho Territorial Supreme Court
- In office July 13, 1870 – December 24, 1875
- Appointed by: Ulysses S. Grant
- Preceded by: Milton Kelly
- Succeeded by: Henry E. Prickett

Personal details
- Born: 1840; Indiana, U.S.
- Died: December 24, 1875 (aged 34–35); Omaha, Nebraska, U.S.
- Political party: Republican
- Spouse: Roxy Anna Moore (m. 1864)
- Children: 2

William Curtis "Curt" Whitson (1840 – December 24, 1875) was an American jurist who served as Associate Justice of the Idaho Territorial Supreme Court from 1870 to 1875.

== Biography ==
Whitson was born in 1840 in Indiana, the son of Benjamin F. and Elisa J. Whitson. At the age of ten, he moved to Polk County, Oregon, where he married Roxy Anna Moore in 1864; they lived in Dallas and would have two children. He studied law and was involved in local Republican politics, and was elected Polk County clerk, and then judge. He resigned as county judge in 1868 to practice law.

On July 13, 1870, President Ulysses S. Grant nominated Whitson to be Associate Justice of the Idaho Territorial Supreme Court, and he was confirmed by the senate later that day. As Whitson's four-year term was drawing to a close, Grant renominated him to the same position on June 8, 1874, and he was confirmed by the senate eleven days later. From September 1874 through June 1875, Justice Whitson was the editor of Lewiston's short-lived The Northerner for its entire 39-issue run, and for the latter two-thirds of that run, he was also its owner. Whitson's judicial service station was changed from Lewiston to Boise in June 1875.

On December 24, 1875, Whitson died from consumption (tuberculosis) at the Grand Central Hotel in Omaha, Nebraska. He was en route to Boise, accompanied by his successor on the supreme court, Henry E. Prickett, having travelled to New York City to seek remedies to his ailments.
