= Josiah Alexander Van Orsdel =

American judge (1860–1937)

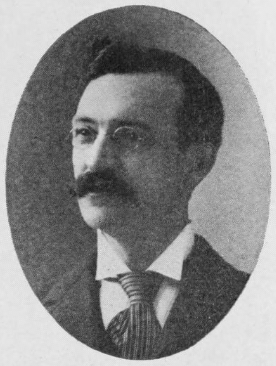

Associate Justice of the United States Court of Appeals for the District of Columbia
- In office November 14, 1907 – August 7, 1937
- Appointed by: Theodore Roosevelt
- Preceded by: Louis E. McComas
- Succeeded by: Justin Miller

Associate Justice of the Wyoming Supreme Court
- In office 1905–1906
- Preceded by: Jesse Knight
- Succeeded by: Richard H. Scott

Personal details
- Born: November 17, 1860 New Bedford, Pennsylvania
- Died: August 7, 1937 (aged 76) Washington, D.C.
- Education: Westminster College (AB) read law

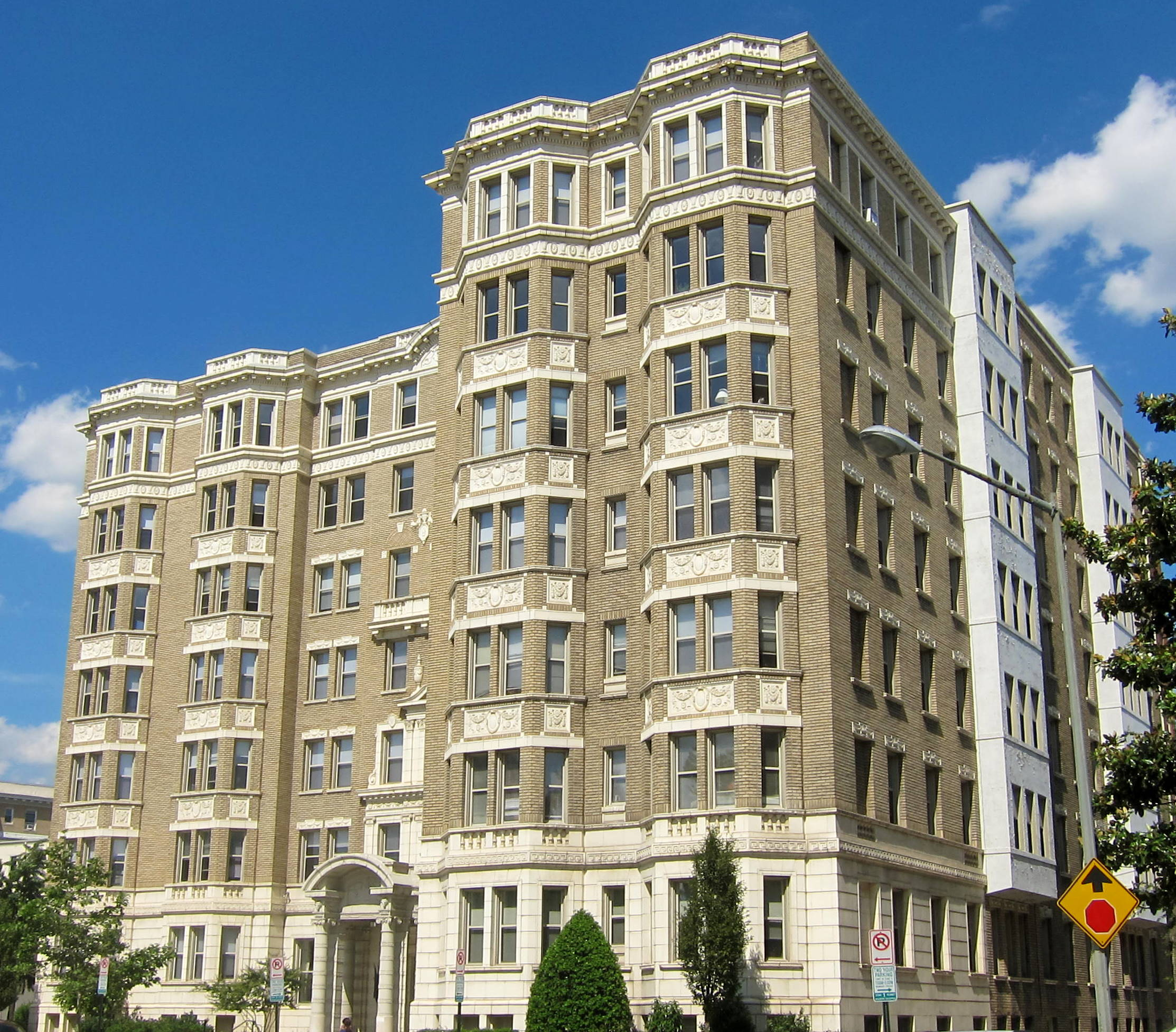
Van Orsdel's former residence in Adams Morgan, Washington, D.C.

Josiah Alexander Van Orsdel (November 17, 1860 – August 7, 1937) was an Associate Justice of the United States Court of Appeals for the District of Columbia.

== Education and career ==
Born on November 17, 1860, in New Bedford, Pennsylvania, Van Orsdel received an Artium Baccalaureus degree in 1885 from Westminster College in New Wilmington, Pennsylvania, then read law in 1890. He was county and prosecuting attorney for Laramie County, Wyoming starting in 1892. He was a member of the Wyoming House of Representatives starting in 1894. He was the Attorney General of Wyoming from 1898 to 1905. He was an associate justice of the Wyoming Supreme Court from 1905 to 1906. He was a United States Assistant Attorney General for the United States Department of Justice from 1906 to 1907.

== Federal judicial service ==
Van Orsdel received a recess appointment from President Theodore Roosevelt on November 14, 1907, to an Associate Justice seat on the Court of Appeals of the District of Columbia (the United States Court of Appeals for the District of Columbia from June 7, 1934, now the United States Court of Appeals for the District of Columbia Circuit) vacated by Associate Justice Louis E. McComas. He was nominated to the same position by President Roosevelt on December 3, 1907. He was confirmed by the United States Senate on December 12, 1907, and received his commission the same day. His service terminated on August 7, 1937, due to his death.

== Sons of the American Revolution ==
Van Orsdel was an active member of the Sons of the American Revolution (SAR). He served as the President of the District of Columbia Society of the SAR from 1924 to 1925, and as National Vice President General from 1925 to 1927. He was elected as the national President General for the 1930–1931 term. Following the sudden death of his successor, Benjamin Newhall Johnson, in February 1932, Van Orsdel was appointed to fill the vacancy, serving a second time until the next annual congress later that year.

== See also ==
- List of United States federal judges by longevity of service

== Sources ==
Legal offices
Preceded by Jesse Knight	Justice of the Wyoming Supreme Court; 1905–1906	Succeeded by Richard H. Scott
Preceded by Louis E. McComas	Associate Justice of the United States Court of Appeals for the District of Columbia; 1907–1937	Succeeded by Justin Miller
