= 124th Illinois Infantry Regiment =

124th Regiment Illinois Volunteer Infantry "Excelsiors"
- Illinois state flag
- Active: September 10, 1862 - August 16, 1865
- Country: United States
- Allegiance: Union
- Branch: Infantry
- Nickname: Excelsior Regiment
- Engagements: Operations against Vicksburg; Central Mississippi Campaign; Battle of Port Gibson; Battle of Raymond; Battle of Jackson, Mississippi; Battle of Champion Hill; Siege of Vicksburg; Mobile Campaign; Battle of Spanish Fort; Battle of Fort Blakeley

The 124th Illinois Volunteer Infantry Regiment, also known as the Excelsior Regiment, was an infantry regiment that served in the Union Army during the American Civil War.

== Background ==
On August 7, 1862, in response to President Abraham Lincoln's call for troops to fight in the American Civil War, a muster roll was begun in the office of Judge John H. Howe in Kewanee, in Henry County, Illinois. Company A and Company F were from the village of Kewanee.

Company B was recruited in Batavia and Lodi, in Kane county.

Company C, known as the Springfield Company, was raised in Springfield, Illinois and in Jersey county.

Company D was raised from Colchester and Tennessee townships in the Illinois county of McDonough. It was consolidated with a band of Good Templars from Chicago and Dundee, Illinois.

== Campaigns ==
After being mustered into federal service, the regiment moved south to begin its service in the Western Theatre. Upon reaching the front at Jackson, Tennessee, it became part of Grant's operations which culminated in the Siege of Vicksburg.

Following duties in the Vicksburg area, the regiment was sent via New Orleans to participate in action against the defenses of Mobile after the Battle of Mobile Bay.

== See also ==
- List of Illinois Civil War Units
- Illinois in the American Civil War

== Sources ==
(From pages 1 – 5 of "History of the 124th Regiment Illinois Infantry Volunteers, Otherwise Known as the "Hundred and Two Dozen," from August 1862 to August 1865," by R L Howard, Chaplain. Springfield, Illinois; printed and bound by H W Rokker. 1880.)
