= Fred H. Blume =

American judge

Chief Justice of Wyoming
- In office 1927–1931
- In office 1937–1939
- In office 1945–1947

Associate Justice of the Supreme Court of Wyoming
- In office 1921–1963
- Appointed by: Robert D. Carey

Member of the Wyoming House of Representatives
- In office 1907–1909

Member of the Wyoming Senate
- In office 1909–1913

Personal details
- Born: January 9, 1875 Winzlar, Germany
- Died: September 26, 1971 (aged 96)
- Party: Republican
- Education: State University of Iowa

Fred Heinrich Blume (/bluːm/; January 9, 1875 – September 26, 1971), or Fred H. Blume, as he referred to himself, was a German-born American attorney and judge. He served as a justice of the Wyoming Supreme Court for 42 years, from 1922 to 1963, and by himself translated from Latin into English the Codex Justinianus and the Novels (or Novellae Constitutiones), two parts of the Corpus Juris Civilis.

== Early life ==
Friedrich Heinrich Blume was born in Winzlar, Germany. In 1887, at the age of 12, Blume immigrated by himself to the US. He joined his elder brother, Wilhelm, who had already immigrated to Elgin, Illinois. Five years later, Fred set off on his own, intending to work in Kansas as a farm hand. However, he fortuitously stopped in Audubon, Iowa, where a German-speaking attorney hired him as an office assistant and let him live in a back room of his office. After completing high school in Audubon, Blume enrolled at the State University of Iowa (now the University of Iowa) in 1895. He graduated in 1898 as a member of Phi Beta Kappa.

== Career ==
Blume was admitted to the practice of law in Iowa in 1899. In 1905, following several years practicing in Iowa, Blume moved with his wife to Sheridan, Wyoming, where J.L. Stotts had offered him a partnership in his law practice. Having already been a city attorney, he turned his focus to a legislative career, serving one term in the Wyoming House of Representatives (1907–09) and two terms in the Wyoming Senate (1909–13) as a Republican. A turning point in his life came in 1912 when he supported the progressive wing of the party--Theodore Roosevelt's Bull Moose Party. When the regular Republicans triumphed, Blume understood that his prospects in Wyoming politics would be limited. Years later Blume wrote about the day after the election: "I decided on that day that I would quit politics and spend the time which I had devoted to it to something else." Blume read extensively about the history of Western civilization. He became especially interested in Roman law and started building an extensive library that eventually would amount to approximately 2,300 volumes.

In 1921, he was appointed to the Wyoming Supreme Court to fill the vacancy caused by the death of Charles E. Blydenburgh, on which he would serve until his retirement in 1963. He served as chief justice during three periods: 1927–31, 1937–39, and 1945–47. He also became a Mason.

== Translation efforts ==
In 1919, while developing his library, he learned that there was no English translation of either the Theodosian Code or the "Code of Justinian" (Codex Justinianus). Of this discovery he wrote: "So, ruminating on the subject, I wondered if I might not be able to add my little mite to the culture of the world by translating at least one of these Codes. Here was the germ of the thought of the translation of the Justinian Code, although I did not realize at the time the difficulties that lay ahead." Blume appears to have begun translating the Codex Justinianus into English in 1920. After being appointed to the court, he continued to work on the translation in his spare time. He noted in his correspondence that he "...devoted to it substantially every evening until eleven o'clock at night or later, and every Saturday afternoon and Sunday with few exceptions." Blume appears to have completed his first draft of the translation in 1923 or 1924, but he continued to study Roman law, revise his translation, and to annotate it extensively. The typed manuscripts of his Annotated Justinian Code and of his Novels translation together amount to more than 4,500 pages.

While he worked on his translation, Justice Blume also taught Roman law at the Northwestern University Law School (at the invitation of its dean, John Henry Wigmore ), wrote scholarly articles about Roman law and used Roman law in his judicial opinions. According to one study, he wrote some 700 opinions in the course of his judicial career, and in 19 cases he cited Roman law 79 times and made reference to Roman law or history in 12 other cases. It apparently was these activities that brought him to the attention of Clyde Pharr, a professor of Greek and Latin at Vanderbilt University. In 1933, Pharr wrote to Blume the first of what would be many letters. Pharr asked the justice to join Pharr's "Project for a Variorum Translation into English of the Entire Body of Roman Law," with Blume's translation of the Code to be used as the basis for the project's version of that document. Pharr indicated the project would translate into English: "1) Brunes, "Fontes Iuris Romani"; 2) other inscriptional material; 3) the pre-Justinian collections of Roman jurisprudence; 4) the Theodosian Code and novels; 5) other pre-Jusinian legislation; 6) the Corpus Juris Civilis; 7) the most important legal materials culled from classical authors such as Cicero, Pliny and Aulus Gellius; 8) papyri material." In the end, Professor Pharr's ambitious project resulted in only two works: "The Theodosian Code" (1952) and "Ancient Roman Statutes" (1961)

In 1938, Blume addressed the Riccobono Seminar on Roman Law, a law society meeting at the Catholic University of America, founded by Salvatore Riccobono, on The Code of Justinian, and its Value By 1939, Blume ceased work on the Code translation as his hopes for publication faded. However, in 1943, Pharr renewed contact with Blume and asked him to send him his manuscript. Justice Blume sent Pharr a draft of his Annotated Justinian Code, and the Novels,which proved extremely valuable for Pharr and his assistants in translating the Theodosian Code and Novels. In the first Theodosian Code draft that Pharr mailed to his editorial consultants in 1944, he wrote of Blume's Justinian's Code translation that it was "of much higher quality than anything else that has been done in this field....We are finding both his translation and his notes invaluable in the interpretation of many difficult and obscure passages of the Theodosian Code." Blume also acted as an editorial consultant for Pharr's project and sent him his own translations of part of Book X and of Books XIV-XVI of the Theodosian Code, which proved very helpful. The Theodosian Code translation was published in 1951 by Princeton University Press as first volume in "The Corpus of Roman Law" series; Blume is specially noted by Pharr in preface.

Professor Pharr continued his project at the University of Texas, but he was unable to find the subvention he needed to produce a Codex Justinianus translation based on Blume's. When Justice Blume retired from the Wyoming Supreme Court in 1963, after 43 years on the bench, the Annual Survey of American Law called him "...the last of that line of judicial giants, famed in American legal history, who moved west in the vanguard of civilization, helped mold the jurisprudence of the youthful states...and injected into the mainstream of American law, the sprightly breeze of a favonian current."

== Posthumous publication ==
Justice Blume died at age 96 in 1971 with his magnum opus unpublished. However, William Sims Thurman reported having used Blume's translation for his own work on Justinian's Thirteen Edicts. In 2007, the Annotated Justinian Code], the Novels, and Blume's Riccobono Seminar address, were published at the University of Wyoming College of Law web site. In 2013, an English translation of Kroll's Latin Preface to the Novels, by Miller and Kearley, was added to the site. A 2nd edition of the Annotated Justinian Code, containing numerous editions and corrections, was published in 2009. (The only other English translation of Justinian's Code was made by Samuel Parsons Scott, who did not work from the most authoritative Latin versions and whose translation of the entire Corpus Juris Civilis was not well received.) A new English translation of the Code, created by a ten-person editorial panel and based on Blume's, was published in October 2016. This new translation has been well received by scholars.

== Writings by Justice Blume ==
- "The Roman Lawyer," 1922 WYO. BAR ASS'N. REP. 40.
- "Human Rights and Property Rights," 64 U.S. L. REV. 581 (1930).
- "Human Rights and Property Rights and other Facts in the History of Private Law," 1930 WYO. ST. BAR ASS'N. REP. 67.
- "Legitimation under the Roman Law," 5 TULANE L. REV. 256 (1931).
- "Epitome of the Roman Law," 24 A.B.A. J. 660 (1938) (reviewing Charles Phineas Sherman, EPITOME OF THE ROMAN LAW (1937)).
- "The Code of Justinian, and its Value" (Address to the Riccobono Seminar on Roman Law, Washington D.C., May 1938) .
- "Argument from Roman Law in Political Thought, 1200-1600," 28 A.B.A. J. 337 (1942) (reviewing Myron Piper Gilmore, ARGUMENT FROM ROMAN LAW IN POLITICAL THOUGHT (1941).
- "Bracton and His Time," 2 WYO. L. J. 43 (1947).
- "Contractual Obligations," 1936 WYO. ST. BAR PROC. 110.
- "Roman Law, An Historical Introduction" 5 OKLA. L. REV. 264 (1952) (reviewing Hans Julius Wolff, ROMAN LAW, AN HISTORICAL INTRODUCTION (1951).
- "Address to New Members of the Bar," 8 WYO. L. J. 41 (1954).
