= Charles E. Blydenburgh =

American politician (1854–1921)

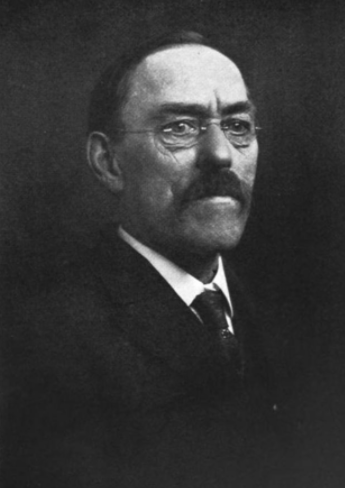

Justice on the Wyoming Supreme Court
- In office November 11, 1917 – April 17, 1921
- Preceded by: Richard H. Scott
- Succeeded by: Fred H. Blume

Member of the Wyoming Territorial House of Representatives
- In office 1889–1890

Personal details
- Born: Charles Edward Blydenburgh; March 19, 1854 Brooklyn, New York, U.S.
- Died: April 17, 1921 (aged 67) Cheyenne, Wyoming, U.S.
- Party: Democratic
- Spouse: Isabelle Cannon
- Children: 7
- Parents: Benjamin B. Blydenburgh (father); Mary Brower (mother)
- Education: Princeton University; Columbia University

Charles Edward Blydenburgh (March 19, 1854 – April 17, 1921) was an American politician who served as a member of the Wyoming House of Representatives and the Wyoming Supreme Court as a Democrat.

== Life ==
Charles Edward Blydenburgh was born on March 19, 1854, in Brooklyn, New York to Benjamin B. Blydenburgh and Mary Brower. He attended private schools in Brooklyn, Connecticut, and Lawrenceville, New Jersey, and then entered Princeton University where he received a Bachelor of Arts in 1874 and a Master of Arts in 1877. In 1878 he received a degree in engineering from Columbia University and moved to the Wyoming Territory where he served as a mining engineer. From 1880 to 1888 he was involved in a newspaper business in Rawlins and was admitted to the legal bar in 1889. On June 21, 1894, he married Isabelle Cannon in Rawlins and would later have seven children with her.

From 1881 to 1882 he served as superintendent of schools in Carbon county and from 1889 to 1890 served in the territorial state house. In 1892 he was elected to Rawlins' city council and served until 1894 and then served on the Wyoming Democratic Party's state committee from 1896 to 1898. He served as a delegate to the 1900 Democratic National Convention.

He was given the Democratic nomination for the state's supreme court in 1898 and 1914, but was defeated both times. On November 1, 1917, Governor Frank L. Houx appointed Blydenburgh to a seat on the Wyoming Supreme Court vacated by the death of Richard H. Scott. Blydenburgh took the oath of office as justice on November 11, 1917, and in 1918 he was elected for the remainder of the unexpired term for which he had been appointed. On April 15, 1921, he suffered a stroke and died on April 17.

Political offices
Preceded by Richard H. Scott	Justice of the Wyoming Supreme Court; 1917–1921	Succeeded by Fred H. Blume
