= Gibson Clark =

American judge (1844-1914)

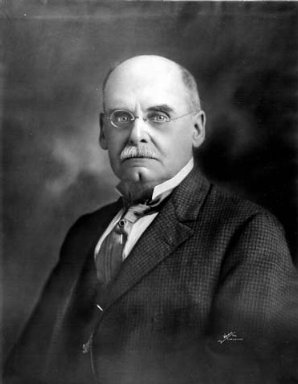

Judge of the Wyoming Supreme Court
- In office November 1892 – September 22, 1894
- Appointed by: Amos Walker Barber
- Preceded by: Homer Merrell
- Succeeded by: Samuel T. Corn

United States Attorney for the District of Wyoming
- In office 1894–1898
- President: Grover Cleveland; William McKinley
- Preceded by: Position officially created
- Succeeded by: Benjamin M. Ausherman

Personal details
- Born: December 5, 1844 Millwood, Virginia, U.S.
- Died: December 14, 1914 (aged 70) Cheyenne, Wyoming, U.S.
- Resting place: Lakeview Cemetery. Cheyenne, Wyoming
- Spouse: Frances A. (Johnson) Clark (married 1881; died 1918)
- Children: 4
- Parents: James Hopkins Clark (father); Jane Adelaide Gregory Clark (mother)

Military service
- Allegiance: Confederate States of America
- Branch/service: Confederate States Army
- Years of service: 1861–1865
- Battles/wars: Chickamauga; Spottsylvania; Cold Harbor; Gettysburg; Petersburg

Gibson Clark (December 5, 1844 – December 14, 1914) was an American jurist who served as a justice of the Wyoming Supreme Court from January 2, 1893, to September 22, 1894. He would resign that position in order to become the first official US Attorney for the District of Wyoming. He was born in Clarke County, Virginia and served in the Confederate Army during the American Civil War.

== Early life ==
Gibson Clark was born in Millwood, Virginia, in December 1844 to James Hopkins Clark and Jane Adelaide Gregory Clark. He was educated in public schools and at the beginning of the Civil War he enlisted in the Confederate army, serving with the Parker battery until the final surrender of Appomattox. He fought in some of the bloodiest battles of the war, including Chickamauga, Spottsylvania, Cold Harbor, Gettysburg and Petersburg. At the end of the war he returned to Virginia but in 1866 moved to St. Louis, Missouri, where he was employed as a clerk in a mercantile establishment. Later that same year he went to Fort Laramie, Wyoming, then in the territory of Dakota, arriving there from Nebraska City. There he was employed as a clerk and bookkeeper in the post trader's store. He was elected to the Territorial Legislative Assembly in 1871. From 1872 to 1883 he worked in mining in Nevada and Utah.

== Career in law and as a judge ==
He read law while living on his earnings as a clerk and in 1880 was admitted to the Utah bar, but did not begin practice until 1883, when he moved to Fort Collins, Colorado and opened an office. He remained there until 1886 and then moved to Cheyenne, Wyoming, quickly building up a lucrative practice here. In November 1892, he was elected to the Wyoming Supreme Court. He resigned on September 22, 1894, to accept an appointment as the first U.S. Attorney for the district of Wyoming. After his term expired in 1898, he resumed his legal practice with his son, John D. Clark, with the firm of Clark & Clark. He also served as a trustee for the Cheyenne School District and University of Wyoming.

== Family ==
In 1881, he was married to Frances A. Johnson of Iowa, who had four sons with him. John D. Clark was one of Cheyenne's lawyers, having been engaged in the practice with his father for several years and continued it after his father's death. Hopkins Clark was a civil engineer and lived in Los Angeles, California. Frank Clark resided in Cheyenne and identified with the Federal Land company. Not much is known about Rober Clark except he was a student in Cheyenne.

== Death ==
Judge Gibson Clark died at 1:30 in the morning at his residence at No. 321 East Seventeenth Street. At his bedside when the end came were his wife and four sons. The end had been anticipated for nearly a fortnight. The funeral was held at St. Mark's Episcopal Church.

== Miscellaneous ==
Clark died on December 14, 1914, in Cheyenne. An elementary school in Cheyenne was named for him in 1920 and torn down in 2009.

A veteran of the Confederate army, he became a supporter of the united country. An address which he delivered at a G.A.R. meeting some years ago was considered a piece of patriotic sentiment delivered in the state.

Political offices
Preceded by Homer Merrell	Justice of the Wyoming Supreme Court; 1893–1894	Succeeded by Samuel T. Corn
