= Calvin Cobb =

Calvin Cobb (July 15, 1853, in Cleveland, Ohio) was an American publisher. He grew up in Chicago and worked with his father in the Cobb Library publishing house. During the 1880s he became involved in the livestock trade. Because of this work he ended up traveling west and visiting Boise for the first time in June 1877.

After falling in love with the city, Cobb negotiated in May 1889, to buy the Idaho Statesman newspaper with Joseph Perrault and R. Willman. Later, Cobb and his brother-in-law, Jack Lyon, gained controlling interest of the Statesman.

Cobb worked actively in the newspaper business. He served a term as vice-president of the Associated Press. Cobb became involved in national events and politics, as well as local ones. In 1896 he directed a campaign in the Idaho Statesman against “free silver.” He was a friend of Senator William Borah (until Borah ran on William Jennings Bryan’s “silver” ticket), and of presidents William Howard Taft and Theodore Roosevelt (until Roosevelt split from the Republican Party, prompting Cobb’s famous 1912 editorial--”Teddy, you stink”).

In answering a 1928 questionnaire about the newspaper’s support of civic movements, Cobb commented:

Sorry to say we supported woman’s suffrage and direct primary. Our best work was in getting telegraph, telephone and railroads into Boise, and finally the main line. We opposed free silver and had a hell of a time for six months. The Statesman started as a Republican paper and the vote here was usually 7,000 Democrats to 400 or 500 Republicans.

Cobb married Fanny Howes Lyon of Chicago on February 7, 1878. They had two children: Lyon (died in 1921) and Margaret Cobb Ailshie (later Mrs. James F. Ailshie, Jr., and successor to Cobb as Statesman publisher). Mrs. Cobb died October 11, 1917.

Calvin Cobb died November 7, 1928, in Boise.
