= Margaret Cobb Ailshie =

- Born: March 27, 1883; Chicago
- Died: August 26, 1959 (aged 76)
- Occupations: Socialite, publisher, and social activist

Margaret Cobb Ailshie (March 27, 1883 – August 26, 1959) was a social belle, publisher, and social activist in Boise and Chicago.

== Early years ==
Born in Chicago in 1883, she lived in Chicago for only six years before her father Calvin Cobb bought the Idaho Statesman and moved the family to Boise. Ailshie was raised as a socialite and went to Miss Porter's Boarding School in Farmington, Connecticut. She traveled among a wealthy elite. She traveled abroad to serve in France in World War I as a member of the Red Cross.

Ailshie went to New York City to help with the Spanish flu pandemic and then ran a canteen in France. She returned at the age of 36 in the year 1919. Nine years later her father died. Her family lived at 212 W. Idaho Street, where after her father's death she carried on his mission of making Boise a better place.

== Publisher of the Statesman ==
Ailshie was the first woman publisher of the Idaho Statesman, and the paper described her as fearless. As publisher of the Statesman she followed the policies provided by her father, Calvin Cobb. Ailshie held the post from 1928 to 1959 and guided the newspaper to greater growth.

Ailshie became publisher when her father died in 1928. A year later she married attorney James F. Ailshie Jr., son of Idaho Supreme Court Justice James F. Ailshie and former United States District Attorney. The marriage ended in divorce in 1937, and the Ailshies had no children.

When Calvin Cobb purchased the paper, it was only a tri-weekly. In 1942 Ailshie led the Statesman to produce an evening paper. Ailshie led the paper to reach a circulation goal of 50,000 for the Sunday edition. She founded a new site for the Statesman building. At the time it faced Steunenberg park, and surrounded the Ada County courthouse.

The newspaper achieved a daily circulation of 30,000 in the early 1940s under her leadership. Writing in 1947, American journalist John Gunther described Ailshie as "an extreme reactionary–something to the right of Louis XIV or Boies Penrose say–and a genuine patrician."

== Other projects ==
Ailshie's favorite projects were the Julia Davis Park restoration of a pioneer village and the construction of Bronco Stadium. The Idaho Statesman provided nearly the entire cost of the stadium.

Ailshie belonged to no clubs in Boise, though she entertained numerous guests at her home from her travels around the globe. She endowed the Margaret Cobb Ailshie Trust, which benefited many public institutions over the years.

She closely watched the Harry Orchard case in the assassination of Gov. Frank Steunenberg. Her papers elucidate documentation regarding this historical case, including the confession of Harry Orchard.
