= Edward A. Thomas =

American judge (1838–1890)

Edward A. Thomas (April 27, 1838 – September 2, 1890) was an American jurist who served as a justice of the Territorial Wyoming Supreme Court from March 20, 1873, to December 14, 1877.

Born in Cayuga County, New York, Thomas was captain in the Union Army in the American Civil War, and was a lawyer, and later mayor in Auburn, New York.

On March 20, 1873, President Ulysses S. Grant appointed Thomas, then 35 years old, to the Territorial Wyoming Supreme Court, to replace John W. Kingman. During his four years of service there, Thomas "was the compiler for the first volume of the Wyoming Supreme Court decisions".

He resigned from the court on December 14, 1877, and "returned East, where he devoted some of his time to writing", which included the authorship of several novels and a dictionary of biography. Thomas died in Norristown, Pennsylvania.

Political offices
| Preceded by John W. Kingman | Justice of the Territorial Wyoming Supreme Court; 1873–1877 | Succeeded by William Ware Peck |
