= Jesse Knight (judge) =

American judge (1850–1905)

Jesse Knight (July 5, 1850 – April 9, 1905) was a justice of the Wyoming Supreme Court from December 18, 1897, to April 9, 1905.

He was born in Boonville, New York, to Jesse and Henrietta Knight. His father died of yellow fever in the Isthmus of Panama before Knight was born. Knight attended Lewis, Oneida, and Fulton county schools, and then lived in Minnesota with his uncle from 1867 to 1869. He moved to Omaha, Nebraska, and then to the Territory of Wyoming, where he worked in various occupations including as a store clerk and postmaster.

Knight then became a court clerk and attorney, opening a law practice in Evanston, Wyoming. While in practice, Knight "was appointed Territorial Auditor of Wyoming, taking oath of office March 31, 1882, and serving until March 31, 1884". He was also a land sales agent for the Union Pacific Railroad, and was elected prosecuting attorney of Uinta County, Wyoming in 1888. Following Wyoming's admission to the Union in 1890, Knight was elected to the state constitutional convention, and in 1896 was elected as a judge of the state's Third Judicial District.

Knight was appointed to the Wyoming Supreme Court in 1897, and was elected to a full eight-year term in 1898. He became Chief Justice, serving in that capacity until his sudden and unexpected death from pneumonia.

Political offices
Preceded by Asbury B. Conaway	Justice of the Wyoming Supreme Court; 1897–1905	Succeeded by Josiah Alexander Van Orsdel
