= Mary Brown Pharr =

American classicist (1919 – 1972

Mary Brown Pharr (November 22, 1919 – December 24, 1972) was an American classicist, best known for her work with her husband Clyde Pharr on the translation of the Codex Theodosianus.

== Early life and education ==
Born in Lebanon, Tennessee, Mary Brown received her secondary school education at the Webb School in Bell Buckle, Tennessee. She taught the classics in public schools and was assistant professor of classics at Converse College (now Converse University) in Spartanburg, South Carolina. Brown earned an M.A. in classics at Vanderbilt University in 1944 with a thesis titled A Study in Roman Criminal Law, which was a translation of Book IX of the Theodosian Code.

== Career ==
On November 10, 1945, Mary Brown, nearly 26, married her advisor Clyde Pharr and became his research assistant. By April, 1946, Mary was the assistant editor of the Theodosian Code translation project, which was to be the first volume in a series translating the whole body of Roman law. In addition to working on the Theodosian Code translation, Mary Brown Pharr published two articles of her own: "Crimes of Soldiers in the Theodosian Code," and "The Kiss in Roman Law."

Mary accompanied Clyde Pharr to the University of Texas, Austin in 1950 when he accepted the position of Visiting Professor of Classics there. They both continued to work on the Theodosian Code translation, which finally was published by the Princeton University Press in 1952. Thereafter they shifted their attention to the Justinian Code translation, which was to be the next volume of the Corpus Juris Romani. However, when Mary died on December 24, 1972, and Clyde Pharr died one week after, that project remained incomplete.
