= Milton Kelly =

American judge and newspaper editor

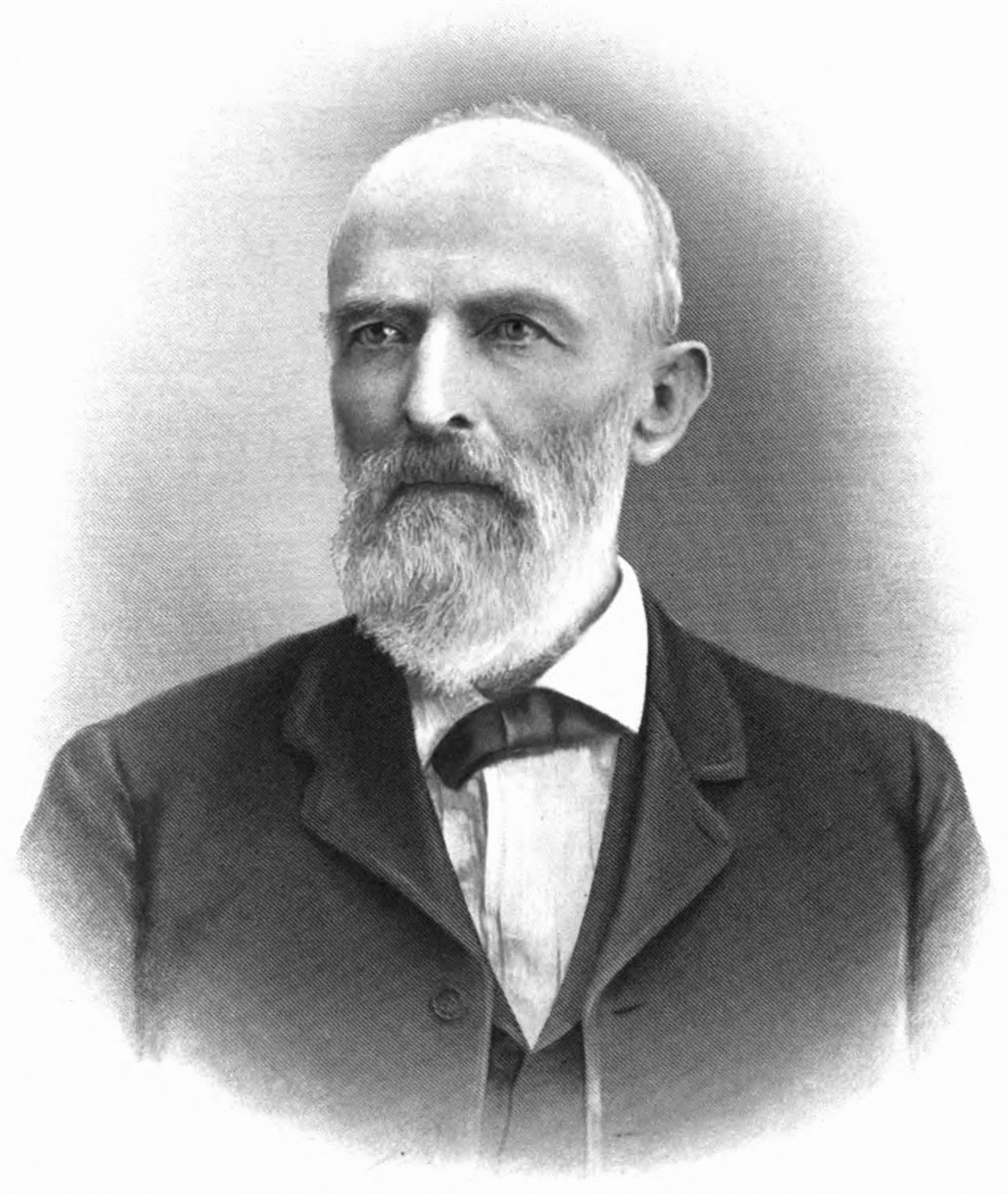

Associate Justice of the Idaho Territorial Supreme Court
- In office April 17, 1865 – July 1870
- Appointed by: Abraham Lincoln; Andrew Johnson; Ulysses S. Grant
- Preceded by: Samuel C. Parks
- Succeeded by: W. C. Whitson

Member of the Idaho Territorial House of Representatives
- In office 1863–1864
- Constituency: Boise County

Personal details
- Born: September 9, 1818 Onondaga County, New York, U.S.
- Died: April 9, 1892 (aged 73) Boise, Idaho, U.S.
- Party: Republican
- Spouse: Lois Eliza Humphrey (m. 1843)
- Children: 4
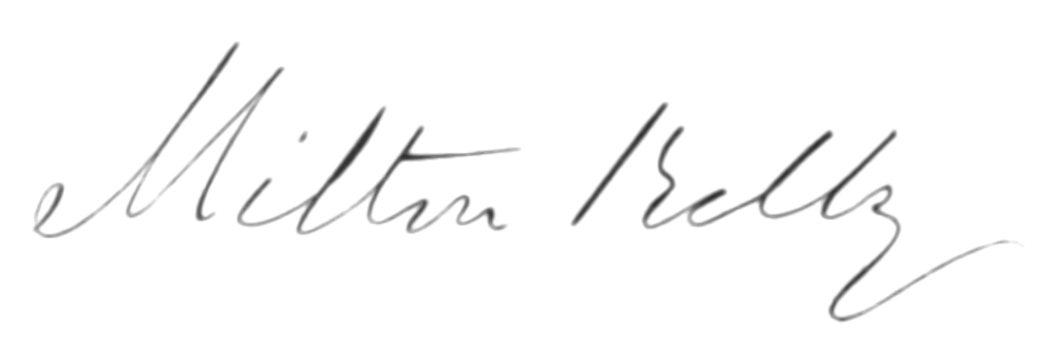
- Signature

Milton Kelly (September 9, 1818 – April 9, 1892) was an American lawyer, politician, jurist and newspaper editor who served on the Idaho Territorial Supreme Court from 1865 to 1870, and as owner and editor of the Idaho Statesman from 1871 to 1889.

== Biography ==
Kelly was born on September 9, 1818, in Onondaga County, New York, the son of a farmer. He was educated in Bloomfield, New York, before relocating to Ohio, and then Wisconsin, where he was a merchant, studied law, and was admitted to the bar around 1845. In 1843, he married Connecticut native Lois Eliza Humphrey, and they would have four children. After prominently practicing law there, he moved to West in 1861, first to California, then to Auburn, Oregon, where he engaged in the transportation business between that town and Placerville, which would become part of the Idaho Territory in 1863. He moved to Placerville, and then Rocky Bar, in 1863, and was elected by Boise County as a Republican to the first session of the Idaho Territorial House of Representatives. He was defeated for re-election the following year.

Kelly received a recess appointment to be Associate Justice of the Idaho Territorial Supreme Court from President Abraham Lincoln that took effect on April 17, 1865, two days after Lincoln's assassination. On December 20, 1865, President Andrew Johnson nominated him for a full term, and he was confirmed by the senate on January 15, 1866. As his four-year term ended, Kelly was renominated by President Ulysses S. Grant on January 17, 1870, and was confirmed by the senate a week later. He was removed by President Grant in July 1870, and replaced by W. C. Whitson.

After his judicial service, which was based in Lewiston, Kelly relocated to Boise, and on January 2, 1871, he purchased the Idaho Statesman from James Reynolds. Under his leadership, it strengthened its position as the state's leading paper, and he sold it in 1889 to the newly formed Statesman Publishing Company. That year, he purchased a resort near Table Rock that would be known as Kelly Hot Springs. He died in Boise on April 9, 1892.
