= Micah C. Saufley =

American judge (1842–1910)

Micah Chrisman Saufley (May 13, 1842 – August 12, 1910) was a justice of the Territorial Wyoming Supreme Court from April 23, 1888, to October 11, 1890.

Born in Wayne County, Kentucky, Saufley served in the Confederate States Army during the American Civil War, in which he was first lieutenant in Morgan's Men of the Confederate cavalry. During the war, he was imprisoned for a time at Johnson's Island in Ohio. Upon his return, he studied law in Monticello, Kentucky and Louisville, Kentucky to gain admission to the bar of that state, and then "established a successful practice in Stanford, Kentucky.

In 1888, President Grover Cleveland appointed Saufley to a seat as an associate justice of the Supreme Court of the Territory of Wyoming. In 1890, when Wyoming achieved statehood, the territorial court was abolished, and Saufley resumed the private practice of law in Stanford, Kentucky. Saufley later returned to the bench as a judge of the Thirteenth Judicial district of Kentucky, a position he held at the time of his death. It was thought that he would be "one of the leading candidates for the Democratic nomination for Governor in the next election", but the death of one his sons in 1909 led him to withdraw from politics.

Saufley died from sudden heart failure in his barn where he had gone to feed the chickens.

Political offices
Preceded by Jacob B. Blair	Justice of the Territorial Wyoming Supreme Court; 1888–1890	Succeeded by Seat abolished
