= William Sims Thurman =

Classicist (1931-2019)

William Sims Thurman (March 17, 1931–March 9, 2019) was a classicist whose major contribution to scholarship is his English translation of Justinian's Thirteen Edicts (The Thirteen Edicts of Justinian; Translated and Annotated by William Sims). Thurman was born in Paris, but he lived much of his life in Asheville, North Carolina where he taught at the University of North Carolina at Asheville.

Thurman earned Master of Arts and Doctor of Philosophy degrees from the University of Texas at Austin, where he was a student of noted classicist and translator Clyde Pharr. Pharr focused on Roman law towards the end of his career and is best known for his translation of the Theodosian Code, but he also began an English translation of the Code of Justinian that he never completed. Thurman's thesis and dissertation were related to Pharr's work on Justinian in that the Thirteen Edicts are later Justinian laws attached to Justinian's Novellae Constitutiones.

After obtaining his Ph.D., Thurman held positions at Winthrop University and at Harvard University's Center for Byzantine Studies. From Harvard, Thurman went to the University of North Carolina at Asheville where he began its classics program. He was a member of the Eta Sigma Phi National Honorary Classical Languages fraternity.

== Selected publications ==
- A vocabulary to the Institutes of Justinian, listed in order of 1st occurrence (Manuscript). University of Texas at Austin. 1959.
- Corpus juris civilis. Novellae constitutiones. Justinian's Edict thirteen (Master of Arts thesis). University of Texas at Austin. 1959.
- The Thirteen Edicts of Justinian; Translated and Annotated by William Sims Thurman (Ph.D. thesis). University of Texas at Austin. 1964.
- "How Justinian I Sought to Handle the Problem of Religious Dissidents". Greek Orthodox Theological Review. 8: 15–40. 1968.
- "A Law of Justinian Concerning the Right of Asylum". Transactions and Proceedings of the American Philological Association. 1969. p. 593-606.
- "The Application of Subiecti to Roman Citizens in the Imperial Laws of the Later Roman Empire". Klio. 52: 453–464. 1970. doi:10.1524/klio.1970.52.52.453.
- "How Justinian I Sought to Handle the Problem of Religious Dissidents". Greek Orthodox Theological Review. 8: 15–40. 1968.
- "Roman Lyric Poetry: Catullus and Horace" [Review of Roman Lyric Poetry: Catullus and Horace]". The Modern Language Journal. 55 (4): 262–262. 1971. doi:10.2307/323089.
- "The Aeneid: A Retelling for Young People" [Review of The Aeneid: A Retelling for Young People]". The Modern Language Journal. 55 (5): 330–331. 1971. doi:10.2307/323415.
- "TDeath and Burial in the Roman World" [Review of Death and Burial in the Roman World]". The Modern Language Journal. 55 (7): 483–484. 1971. doi:10.2307/322925.
- "Amphitruo (non sic, sed vere: Plautus: Amphitruo") [Review of Amphitruo (non sic, sed vere: Plautus: Amphitruo)]". The Modern Language Journal. 55 (8): 532–533. 1971. doi:10.2307/323805.
- "A Juridical and Theological Concept of Nature in the Sixth Century A.D". Byzantinoslavica. 32: 77–85. 1971.
- "Alexander and the Hellenistic World" [Review of Alexander and the Hellenistic World]". The Modern Language Journal. 56 (2): 100–101. 1971. doi:10.2307/326093.
- "Intellegenda" [Review of Intellegenda]". The Modern Language Journal. 56 (3): 179. 1972. doi:10.2307/324045.
- "Erasmus" [Review of Erasmus]". The Modern Language Journal. 56 (7): 475. 1972. doi:10.2307/325133.
- "The New Testament in Modern Greek: Ancient Text with Modern Greek Translation" [Review of 'The New Testament in Modern Greek: Ancient Text with Modern Greek Translation]". The Modern Language Journal. 56 (4): 249. 1972. doi:10.2307/326142.
- "De Raptu Proserpinae [Review of De Raptu Proserpinae]". The Modern Language Journal. 56 (5). Co-written with Claudian and J. B. Hall: 339–340. 1972. doi:10.2307/324294.
- "From Myth to Icon: Reflections of Greek Ethical Doctrine in Literature and Art" [Review of From Myth to Icon: Reflections of Greek Ethical Doctrine in Literature and Art]". The Modern Language Journal. 64 (4). Co-written with H. F. North: 511–512. 1980. doi:10.2307/325914.
