= Erik P. Kimball =

American judge

Erik P. Kimball is a United States bankruptcy judge in the West Palm Beach Division of the Southern District of Florida. He was appointed to the 14-year term in June 2008.

== Biography ==
A 1983 graduate of Hopedale High School, Kimball earned a Juris Doctor from Boston College Law School in 1990 and a B.A. from the University of Massachusetts Amherst in 1987.

== Career ==
He started his legal practice at Hale and Dorr in the Boston office of the Commercial Law and Bankruptcy Department. He left to become a vice president at Colonial Management Associates, Inc.
