= John H. Howe (judge) =

American judge (1822–1873)

John Homer Howe (September 12, 1822 – April 3, 1873) was an American jurist who served as chief justice of the Territorial Wyoming Supreme Court from April 6, 1869 to October 14, 1871.

Born in Riga, New York, Howe first began to practice law in Ohio, eventually moving to Kewanee, Henry County, Illinois, where he became a prominent lawyer, and eventually held the office of Circuit Judge. In 1862, while continuing to serve as a judge, he entered the Union Army as a captain in the 124th Illinois Infantry Regiment. He was made lieutenant colonel soon after, and was an actual command of the regiment during its service. He won distinction during the Vicksburg campaign, and in 1865 was made a Brevet Brigadier General. After the war he resumed his legal practice, and was frequently talked of as a candidate for congress in the 5th District.

On April 6, 1869, President Ulysses S. Grant appointed Howe chief justice of the Wyoming Territory. The entire Congressional Delegation for Illinois united in recommending him for this appointment. When the Territory of Wyoming extended the right to vote to women in 1870, Howe, as chief justice, interpreted this to mean that women could also serve on juries, and encouraged them to do so. Howe's efforts resulted in the first "mixed" juries, containing both men and women, which Howe argued would have a "civilizing" effect on proceedings, and give women greater power to address legal wrongs against them. Howe's efforts were resisted by male lawyers, and ultimately his successor in office reversed this policy. Howe resigned on October 14, 1871, and was later appointed as secretary to a commission adjudicating a boundary dispute between the United States and Mexico.

Howe died in Laredo, Texas, and was interred in Kewanee, Illinois.

Political offices
| Preceded by Newly created office | Justice of the Territorial Wyoming Supreme Court; 1869–1871 | Succeeded by Joseph M. Carey |
