= Herman V.S. Groesbeck =

American judge (1849–1929)

Herman V.S. Groesbeck (July 8, 1849 – June 28, 1929) was an American jurist who served as a Justice of the Wyoming Supreme Court from October 11, 1890, to January 4, 1897, serving as chief justice for much of that time.

Born in Chittenango, New York, Groesbeck was a schoolteacher and a lawyer, working in several states before settling in Laramie, Wyoming, in 1880. There, he served as "a county attorney, city attorney, and member of the territorial house of representatives". In September 1890, Groesbeck was elected as a Republican to the newly instituted Wyoming Supreme Court, along with Willis Van Devanter and Asbury B. Conaway. The three justices drew straws to determine the length of their terms; Van Devanter drew the short term, and with it the position of chief justice. When Van Devanter resigned that same year, Groesbeck then became Chief Justice for the remainder of his term.

Groesbeck was defeated in his bid for reelection in 1896, by opponent Samuel T. Corn, after which Groesbeck moved to Washington, D.C., to serve as general counsel to the Federal Land Department within the U.S. Department of the Interior, returning to his private practice in Laramie within a few years.

In the early 1900s, Groesbeck switched his political allegiance to the Socialist Party of America, where he was one of the handful of political figures whose participation in the movement "almost made Socialism respectable". As a Socialist, Groesbeck ran for governor of Wyoming, and for the Supreme Court, garnering 5% of the vote in the latter race.

In 1922, Groesbeck again ran for a seat on the Wyoming Supreme Court, this time on a nonpartisan ticket, but was again defeated. In 1924, Groesbeck returned to his birth state of New York, moving to Schenectady in 1924 to practice law. He was "re-admitted back into the Republican Party", and in 1928 he became an assistant United States Attorney for the northern district of New York, a position which he held until he died the following year, in Syracuse, New York.

Political offices
Preceded by Newly created seat	Justice of the Wyoming Supreme Court; 1890–1897	Succeeded by Samuel T. Corn
