= Dennis Tippets =

American politician (born 1938)

Member of the Wyoming House of Representatives
- In office 1985–1992

Personal details
- Born: December 30, 1938 (age 87) Wheatland, Wyoming, U.S.
- Party: Republican
- Occupation: mining executive

Dennis W. Tippets (born December 30, 1938) was an American politician in the state of Wyoming. He served in the Wyoming House of Representatives as a member of the Republican Party. He attended the University of Colorado and was a mining company executive.

He beat the incumbent Dale Urbigkit in the 1984 elections but just 51 votes after a recount.
