= Charles N. Potter =

American judge (1852–1927)

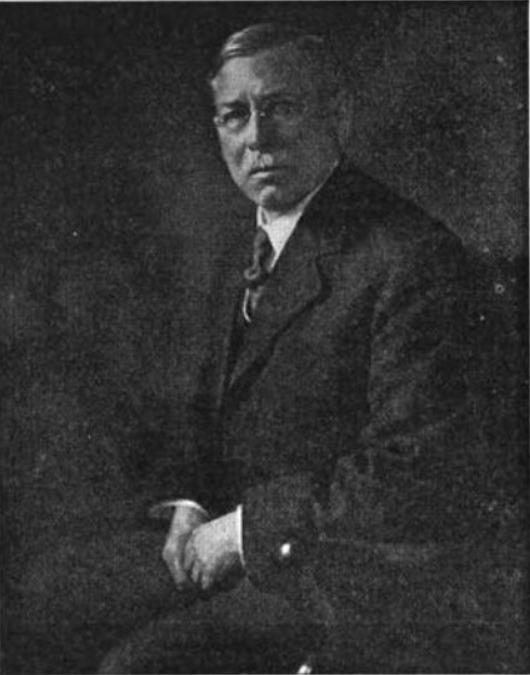
Charles Nelson Potter sometime before 1927

Charles Nelson Potter (October 31, 1852 – December 20, 1927) was an American judge. He was a judge of the Wyoming Supreme Court from January 7, 1895, to December 20, 1927.

Born in Cooperstown, New York, Potter was raised in Grand Rapids, Michigan, and received an LL.B. from the University of Michigan in 1873. Potter then entered the practice of law in Grand Rapids until 1876, when he relocated to Cheyenne, Wyoming. Potter become active in the Republican Party and influential in his legal practice, and in 1887, he entered into a successful law partnership with Willis Van Devanter, who would serve as an associate justice of the Supreme Court of the United States from 1911 to 1937. Potter's political offices in Wyoming included "city attorney, county and prosecuting attorney, member of the Capitol Building Commission", member of the Wyoming Constitutional Convention in 1889. and Wyoming Attorney General. In 1894, Potter was elected to the Wyoming Supreme Court. He was thereafter re-elected in 1902, 1910, 1918 and 1926.

Potter served on the court until his death, in Cheyenne, and was interred in Lakeview Cemetery.

Legal offices
| Preceded by Hugo Donzelmann | Attorney General of Wyoming; 1891 – 1895 | Succeeded by Benjamin F. Fowler |
| Preceded by Samuel T. Corn | Justice of the Wyoming Supreme Court; 1895–1927 | Succeeded by William A. Riner |
