= Ralph Kimball (judge) =

American judge (1878–1959)

Ralph Kimball (November 23, 1878 – November 19, 1959) was a justice of the Wyoming Supreme Court from January 3, 1921, to January 7, 1952.

Born in Nevada, Missouri, Kimball spent two years as an aide to a Missouri Congressman in Washington, D.C., then returned to Missouri. After his admission to the bar in 1899, he relocated to Lander, Wyoming in 1901.

In time Kimball was county attorney, member of the state house of representatives, and a district court judge. On January 3, 1921, Governor Robert D. Carey appointed him as Justice of the Supreme Court to fill the vacancy of Judge Cyrus Beard. Kimball was elected to the same position in 1922 and re-elected in 1928, 1936, and 1944. He retired on January 7, 1952.

Political offices
Preceded by Cyrus Beard	Justice of the Wyoming Supreme Court; 1921–1952	Succeeded by Harry P. Ilsley
