= Magruder Mountain (Nevada) =

Mountain in Nevada, United States

Coordinates: 37°24′39″N 117°32′49″W

Magruder Mountain is a summit in the U.S. state of Nevada. The elevation is 9,035 feet (2,754 m).

Magruder Mountain was named after John B. Magruder, an American Confederate Army general.
