= Ralph Urbigkit =

American politician

Member of the Wyoming House of Representatives
- In office 1967–1967

Personal details
- Died: March 8, 2015
- Party: Democratic
- Children: Dale Urbigkit
- Relatives: Walter Urbigkit (brother)

Ralph Urbigkit (died March 8, 2015) was an American politician. He served as a Democratic member of the Wyoming House of Representatives.

== Life and career ==
Urbigkit was a rancher.

In 1967, Urbigkit was elected to the Wyoming House of Representatives, representing Fremont County, Wyoming.

He was married to Eileen Urbigkeit for 66 years and they had 4 children.

Urbigkit died on March 8, 2015, and his wife died the following year.
