= Glenn Parker (judge) =

American judge (1898–1989)

Justice of Wyoming Supreme Court
- In office 1955–1975
- Appointed by: Milward Simpson

Personal details
- Born: Sherrow Glenn Parker; November 25, 1898 Murray, Iowa
- Died: April 18, 1989 (aged 90) Cheyenne, Wyoming

Glenn Parker (November 25, 1898 – April 18, 1989) was an American jurist who served as a justice of the Wyoming Supreme Court from December 5, 1955, to January 6, 1975, during which period he also served as the chief justice of the court for two non-consecutive four-year terms.

== Career ==
Parker was born in Murray, Iowa, to Charles Parker (1870–1943) and Mary Lavanchie Ball (1873–1958). He grew up on a family farm near Sheridan, Wyoming. Parker attended the University of Wyoming where, in 1922, he earned a Bachelor of Arts degree, and in 1934, a law degree. He was awarded a Rhodes Scholarship to study at the University of Oxford, but declined the offer. Between the time he received his bachelor's degree and his return to law school, he taught school in Laramie and Casper. Parker served in the U.S. Army in World Wars I and II and rose to the rank of colonel.

Parker was admitted to the Wyoming State Bar in 1927 and practiced law in Laramie. At the time, Wyoming did not require attorneys to have a law degree in order to be admitted to the state bar. Parker completed his law degree in 1934 while actively practicing law. In addition to his private practice, he served as city attorney for two years and county attorney for eight years (1932-1940). From 1949 to 1955, he served as a Wyoming state district court judge in the Second Judicial District (Albany County in Laramie).

In 1955, Governor Milward Simpson appointed him to the Wyoming Supreme Court to fill a vacancy caused by the death of Chief Justice William Addison Riner (1878–1955). Parker had been endorsed for the position by the Albany, Carbon, and Sweetwater County Bar Associations. Parker was chief justice from January 1, 1963, to January 2, 1967, and from January 1, 1973, to January 2, 1975. He was the first graduate of the University of Wyoming College of Law to become a state district judge and also the first to serve on the Wyoming Supreme Court. After his retirement in 1975, Parker was associated with the Cheyenne law firm, Hirst and Applegate.

During his legal career, Parker served as Wyoming chairman of the American Bar Association's Committee on Legal Education and Admissions to the Bar and was a member of the American Judicature Society and the American Law Institute. He was also a special lecturer-instructor at the University of Wyoming College of Law.

== Family ==
On June 8, 1924, Parker married, Ruth Beggs (née Lila Ruth Beggs; 1893–1971) in Denver (Weld County). Together, they had two children. After Ruth died, Parker, on October 7, 1972, married Sally Weitz (née Sarah Barbara Joyce; 1913–2016).

=== Death ===
Parker died April 18, 1989, in Cheyenne.

== Bibliography ==
=== References ===
- Casper Star-Tribune (November 28, 1955). "Judge Parker Appointed to State Court" (AP). Vol. 64, no. 252. p. 1. Archived from the original on November 18, 2022 – via Newspapers.com.
- Who's Who in America. → "Parker, Glenn". Vol. 34 (1966–1967). Chicago: Marquis Who's Who. p. 1631 – via Internet Archive (Kahle/Austin Foundation). ISSN 0083-9396. LCCN 04-16934. OCLC 49196293 (all editions).
- Wyoming Blue Book. → "Parker, Glenn" (PDF). Trenholm, Virginia Cole (née Virginia Cole; 1902–1994) (ed.). Vol. (1974). Vol. 3: 1943–1974. Cheyenne: Wyoming State Archives, Department of Commerce. pp. 29–30, 31, 32, 35 (biography), 41, 420, 424. Archived (PDF) from the original on December 1, 2020. LCCN 74-84379; OCLC 70920916.
- Wyoming Blue Book. → "Parker, Glenn". Jost, Loren K. (born 1947) (ed.). Vol. (1991). Vol. 4: 1974–1990 – State Centennial & 50th Legislature Edition. Cheyenne: Wyoming State Archives, Department of Commerce. pp. 135 (biography), 142, 143.
- The Wyo (yearbook). Vol. 14. Laramie: University of Wyoming, Junior Class (publisher). Spring 1922. p. 32 – via Internet Archive.

== See also ==
- Spence, Gerry (1996). The Making of a Country Lawyer: An Autobiography (1st ed.). New York: St. Martin's Trade. pp. 249–250, 265, 267, 284, 311–315, 367 – via Internet Archive (Friends of the San Francisco Public Library). LCCN 96-19683; ISBN 0-3121-4673-6; OCLC 34669365 (all editions).

Legal offices
Preceded by William A. Riner	Justice of the Wyoming Supreme Court; 1955–1975	Succeeded by Richard V. Thomas
Preceded by Volney J. Tidball (1917–2000)	Wyoming State District Judge; Second Judicial District; Albany County (Laramie); 1949–1955	Succeeded by Glen Stanton (1904–1968)
