= Dale Urbigkit =

American politician

Member of the Wyoming House of Representatives
- In office 1983–1984

Personal details
- Born: June 10, 1952 (age 74) Wray, Colorado, U.S.
- Party: Republican
- Parent: Ralph Urbigkit (father)
- Relatives: Walter Urbigkit (uncle)
- Education: Casper College

Dale Urbigkit (born June 10, 1952) is an American politician. He served as a Republican member of the Wyoming House of Representatives.

== Life and career ==
Urbigkit was born in Wray, Colorado. He attended Wind River High School and Casper College.

Urbigkit served in the Wyoming House of Representatives from 1983 to 1984. He was elected as a Republican but had previously been a Democrat. He had been a trustee of the Central Wyoming College but resigned due to the conflict of interest with his new position. Urbigkit stood again in 1984 but lost to Dennis Tippets by just 51 votes.
