= Samuel C. Parks =

American judge (1820–1917)

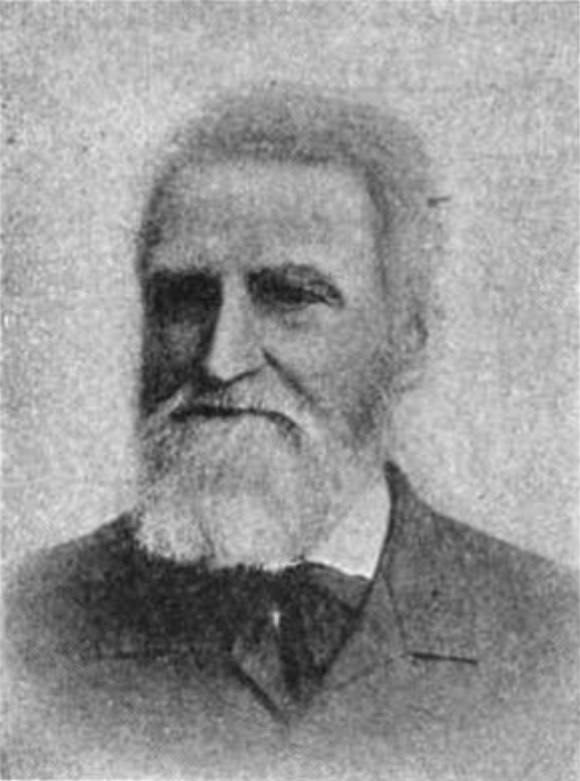

Associate Justice of the Wyoming Territorial Supreme Court
- In office January 11, 1882 – April 14, 1886
- Appointed by: Chester A. Arthur
- Preceded by: William Ware Peck
- Succeeded by: Samuel T. Corn

Associate Justice of the New Mexico Territorial Supreme Court
- In office January 22, 1882 – January 11, 1882
- Appointed by: Rutherford B. Hayes
- Preceded by: Samuel B. McLin
- Succeeded by: Joseph Bell

Associate Justice of the Idaho Territorial Supreme Court
- In office March 10, 1863 – May 1865
- Appointed by: Abraham Lincoln
- Preceded by: position established
- Succeeded by: Milton Kelly

Member of the Illinois House of Representatives
- In office 1855

Personal details
- Born: March 25, 1820 Middlebury, Vermont, U.S.
- Died: February 8, 1917 (aged 96) Kansas City, Missouri, U.S.
- Party: Republican
- Spouse: Elizabeth A. Turley (m. 1853)
- Children: 4

Samuel Chipman Parks (March 25, 1820 – February 8, 1917) was an American lawyer and jurist who practiced law with Abraham Lincoln, and was later appointed to serve as a justice of three different territorial supreme courts by three different presidents, serving on the Idaho Territorial Supreme Court from 1862 to 1865, the New Mexico Territorial Supreme Court from 1878 to 1882, and the Wyoming Territorial Supreme Court from 1882 to 1886.

== Early life, education, and career ==
Born in Middlebury, Vermont, to B. Parks, a professor at Indiana University Bloomington. Parks himself graduated from Indiana University Bloomington in 1838.

Soon after his graduation, in 1840, Parks moved to Springfield, Illinois, where he taught school for six years, received an M.A. from Jacksonville College in 1844, and read law. He became junior member of Abraham Lincoln's law firm. He became one of Lincoln's closest friends, the pair often traveling the Illinois circuit together. In 1853, he married Elizabeth A. Hurley in Logan County, Illinois, and they would have four children.

== Political and judicial activities ==
Parks became active in Illinois politics, serving as a school commissioner, and as a member of the 1848 Illinois Constitutional Convention. In 1855, he was elected to serve in the Illinois House of Representatives. Parks attended both the 1856 and 1860 Republican National Conventions, and was instrumental in having Lincoln nominated for the presidency, primarily by canvassing his native state of Vermont.

On March 6, 1863, President Lincoln nominated him as one of the first associate justices of the newly-established Idaho Territorial Supreme Court, and he was confirmed by the senate four days later. He resigned from the court in 1865, leaving office in May 1865, following the death of one of his children in Illinois. Parks was also a delegate to the 1870 Illinois Constitutional Convention.

On December 15, 1877, President Rutherford B. Hayes nominated Parks as Associate Justice of the New Mexico Territorial Supreme Court, and he was confirmed by the senate on January 22, 1878. At Parks's request, President Chester A. Arthur nominated him as Associate Justice of the Wyoming Territorial Supreme Court on January 6, 1882, and he was confirmed by the senate five days later. He served on the latter court until 1886, and afterwards served on the State Board of Pardons of Kansas and a court referee in Cleveland, Ohio.

== Death ==
He died at the home of his daughter, Mrs. H. D. Lee, of Kansas City, Missouri. At the time of his death, at age 97, he was Indiana University's oldest living alumnus. By coincidence he was laid to rest on the anniversary of the birthday of Abraham Lincoln.

Political offices
Preceded by seat established	Justice of the Idaho Territorial Supreme Court; 1862–1865	Succeeded by Milton Kelly
Preceded by Samuel B. McLin	Justice of the New Mexico Territorial Supreme Court; 1878–1882	Succeeded by Joseph Bell
Preceded by William Ware Peck	Justice of the Wyoming Territorial Supreme Court; 1882–1886	Succeeded by Samuel T. Corn
