= Walter Urbigkit =

American judge

Chief Justice of Wyoming
- In office 1992–1993
- Appointed by: Edgar J. Herschler
- Succeeded by: Richard J. Macy

Personal details
- Born: November 9, 1927 Fremont County, Wyoming, U.S.
- Died: October 31, 2011 (aged 83) Cheyenne, Wyoming, U.S.
- Relatives: Ralph Urbigkit (brother); Dale Urbigkit (nephew)
- Education: University of Wyoming (BA); University of Wyoming College of Law (JD)

Walter C. Urbigkit Jr. (November 9, 1927 – October 31, 2011) was a member of the Wyoming House of Representatives for Laramie, Wyoming, as a Democrat from 1973 to 1985, including two years as minority leader, and later a justice of the Wyoming Supreme Court from November 1, 1985, to January 1993, serving as chief justice from 1991 to 1993. Urbigkit lost his bid for a second term in a retention election in November 1992. In 1987, Urbigkit was credited by The New York Times for advancing the use of the word "conclusory" in jurisprudence.

Born in Burris, Wyoming, to Walter C. and Bertha (Miller) Urbigkit, he graduated from Fremont County Vocational High School in 1945, and then received a B.A. from the University of Wyoming in 1949; he won the university's Distinguished Alumni of the Year Award in 1992. He received a J.D. from the University of Wyoming College of Law in 1951, and served in the United States Army during the Korean War. He then served as an attorney in the United States Veterans Administration from 1953 to 1955, when he left government to open a private law practice in Cheyenne.

Political offices
Preceded by Robert R. Rose, Jr.	Justice of the Wyoming Supreme Court; 1985–1993	Succeeded by William A. Taylor
