= Homer Merrell =

American judge

Homer Merrell (October 2, 1845 – January 18, 1916) was a justice of the Wyoming Supreme Court from November 24, 1890 to January 2, 1893.

Born in Pittsford, New York, Merrell served in the American Civil War as a soldier and a military correspondent. After the war, he entered the mercantile business in Philadelphia, and then the real estate business in Chicago, where he read law to gain admission to the bar. In the wake of the Great Chicago Fire in 1871, Merrell "moved to Laramie and later Rawlins, Wyoming", where he "built a large practice and invested in real estate".

Merrell was a member of the council of the Fifth Legislative Assembly of the Territory of Wyoming in 1877 and 1878. He served as a was County and Prosecuting Attorney of Carbon County, Wyoming, for seven terms of two years each, also serving as Wyoming's Commissioner to the New Orleans Exposition, and president of the Rawlins Board of Trade.

In 1890, Merrell ran for a seat in the U.S. Senate, but was instead accepted an appointment by Governor Francis E. Warren, on November 24, 1890, to a seat on the Wyoming Supreme Court vacated by the resignation of Chief Justice Willis Van Devanter. Merrell resigned on January 2, 1893 and returned to Rawlins. In 1905, he married Gertrude Huntington, one of the first female newspaper editors in Wyoming.

Merrell suffered a stroke in March 1911, and "never fully recovered". He entered the State Hospital in Evanston, Wyoming, shortly thereafter, where he remained until his death.

Political offices
Preceded by Willis Van Devanter	Justice of the Wyoming Supreme Court; 1890–1893	Succeeded by Gibson Clark
