= Magruder Mountain (Idaho) =

Mountain in the state of Idaho

Coordinates: 45°42′25″N 114°49′23″W

Magruder Mountain is a summit in the U.S. state of Idaho.

Magruder Mountain was named after Lloyd Magruder, a pioneer who was killed in a robbery in 1863.
