= Harry Harnsberger =

American judge (1889–1975)

Harry S. Harnsberger

Justice of Wyoming Supreme Court
- In office 1953–1969
- Appointed by: Clifford Joy Rogers

Harry S. Harnsberger (October 1889 – July 1975) was an American jurist who served as a justice of the Wyoming Supreme Court from March 12, 1953, to January 1, 1969.

Harnsberger was born in Decatur, Illinois in 1889. He came to Wyoming in about 1910 to become a cowboy. The depression that year convinced him to return to school. After graduating from Georgetown University Law School, he began his legal practice in Lander, Wyoming in 1914. He was later prosecuting attorney and attorney general. On March 12, 1953, Governor Clifford Joy Rogers appointed Harnsberger as Justice of the Wyoming Supreme Court following the death of Justice Harry P. Ilsley. He served as chief justice in 1967. He retired on January 1, 1969, and died in Cheyenne in 1975. Many of his legal opinions received national recognition. He was most proud of Day v. Armstrong (1961), which ruled that landowners along the North Platte River had no right to prevent boaters from floating or fishing on the river, even if the landowners owned land on both sides of the river.

Political offices
Preceded by Harry P. Ilsley	Justice of the Wyoming Supreme Court; 1953–1969	Succeeded by Leonard McEwan
