= Harry P. Ilsley =

American judge (1884–1953)

Justice of Wyoming Supreme Court
- In office 1952–1953
- Appointed by: Frank A. Barrett

Personal details
- Born: December 7, 1884
- Died: February 18, 1953 (aged 68)

Harry Preston Ilsley (December 7, 1884 – February 18, 1953) was an American jurist who served as a justice of the Wyoming Supreme Court from January 7, 1952, until his death.

Born in Markesan, Wisconsin, he was raised by an aunt and uncle because his parents died at an early age. He attended high school in Deadwood, South Dakota, and graduated from the University of South Dakota School of Law in June 1908. He was admitted to the South Dakota Bar and practiced law in Belle Fourche, South Dakota, until June 1910, when he moved to Sundance, Wyoming. He was admitted to the Wyoming State Bar and practiced law in Sundance until 1920, when Governor Robert D. Carey appointed him to serve as a Wyoming state district court judge. He served two years of an unexpired term and was then elected to five successive six-year terms. On January 7, 1952, Governor Frank A. Barrett appointed him to the Wyoming Supreme Court to fill the unexpired term of retiring Chief Justice of the Wyoming Supreme Court Ralph Kimball. In 1952, he was elected for a full six-year term on the Wyoming Supreme Court. He died in office on February 18, 1953. His son, John, practiced law in Gillette, Wyoming and later served as a district court judge on the Fourth Judicial District Court in Sheridan, Wyoming.

Legal offices
Preceded by Ralph Kimball	Justice of the Wyoming Supreme Court; 1952-1953	Succeeded by Harry Harnsberger
Preceded by E.C. Raymond	Wyoming State District Judge; 1920-1952	Succeeded by Preston T. McAvoy
