= Asbury B. Conaway =

American judge (1837–1897)

Asbury Bateman Conaway (October 13, 1837 – December 8, 1897) was a justice of the Territorial Wyoming Supreme Court from June 21, 1890, to October 11, 1890, and of the Wyoming Supreme Court from October 11, 1890, until his death, on December 8, 1897.

Born near Le Roy, Illinois, Conaway received his law degree from Iowa Wesleyan University, and entered the private practice of law in Chariton, Iowa, in 1861. He moved to Wyoming in 1868, first arriving in South Pass, and relocating to Green River the following year. Conaway was a county attorney and a prosecuting attorney for Sweetwater County, Wyoming, and "was active in politics".

On June 21, 1890, President Benjamin Harrison appointed Conaway to the Wyoming Territorial Supreme Court. Wyoming was admitted to the Union in July of that year, and Conaway was then elected to the newly established Wyoming Supreme Court in September, taking office when the Court was officially sworn in as such in October.

He died near the end of his second term on December 8, 1897.
