= Cyrus Beard =

American judge (1850–1920)

Cyrus Beard (August 13, 1850 – December 16, 1920) was a justice of the Wyoming Supreme Court from January 2, 1905, to December 16, 1920.

Born in Venango County, Pennsylvania, Beard practiced law in Iowa before moving to Evanston, Wyoming in 1890. He "established a prominent practice there", and in 1904 he was elected to the Wyoming Supreme Court. He was re-elected in 1912 and 1920, but died before his third term commenced.
