= Dundee Village Historic District =

Historic district in New York, United States

- U.S. National Register of Historic Places
- U.S. Historic district
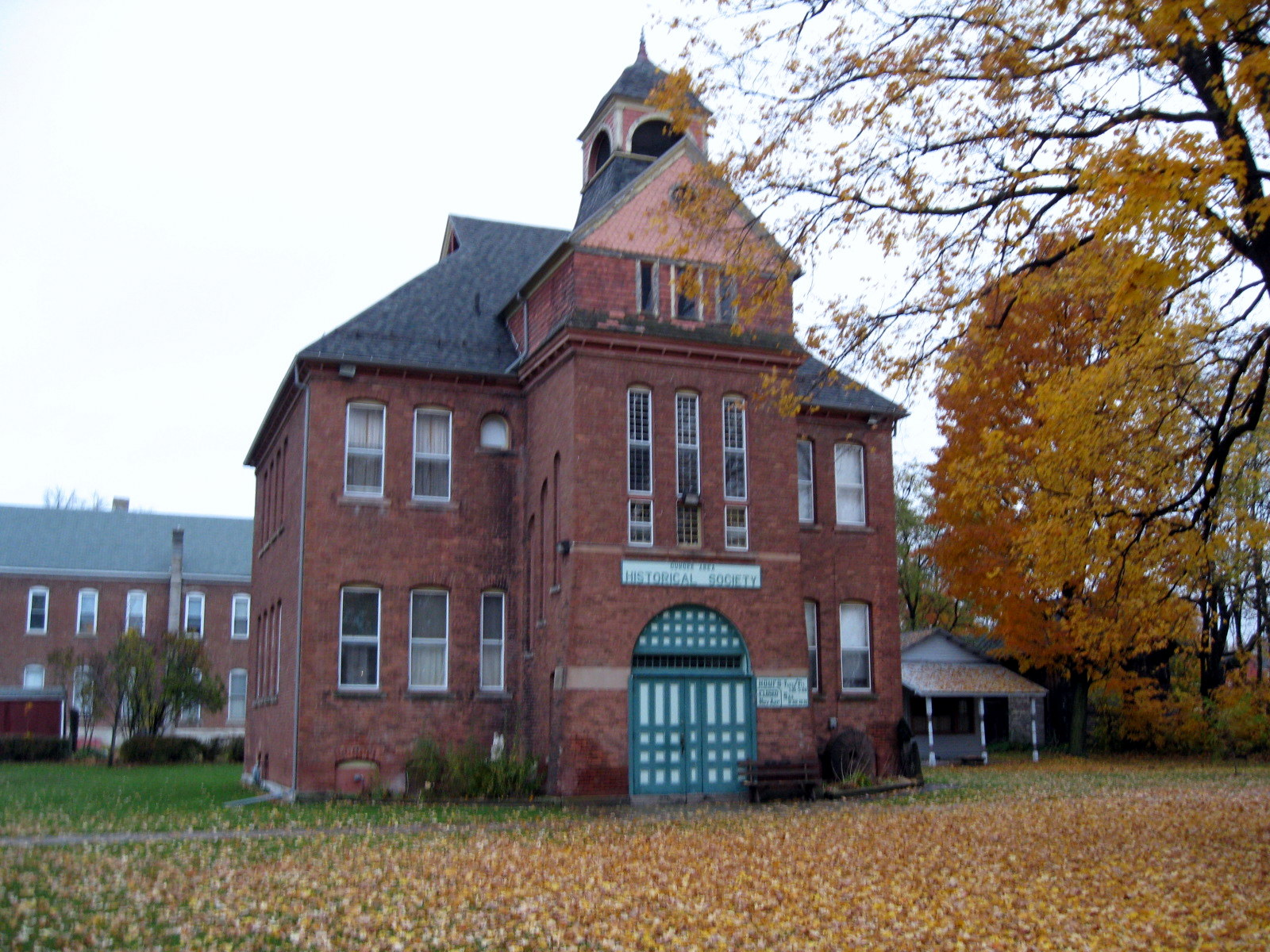
- Greater Dundee Historical Society, October 2009

- Location within New York Location within the United States
- Location: Main, Water, and Seneca Sts., Dundee, New York
- Coordinates: 42°31′24″N 76°58′37″W
- Area: 40 acres (16 ha)
- Architectural style: Mid 19th Century Revival, Late Victorian
- NRHP reference No.: 07000329
- Added to NRHP: April 10, 2007

Dundee Village Historic District is a national historic district located at Dundee in Yates County, New York. Notable buildings include the former school housing the Greater Dundee Historical Society (1891), Dundee State Bank (1901), Baptist Church (1887), and a variety of mid- to late-19th century commercial buildings. The district encompasses 78 contributing buildings and 6 contributing objects in the historic core of Dundee. It includes the separately listed Dundee Methodist Church and First Presbyterian Church.

It was listed on the National Register of Historic Places in 2007.
