= List of United States federal courthouses in Wyoming =

Following is a list of current and former courthouses of the United States federal court system located in Wyoming. Each entry includes the building's name, image (if available), location, and jurisdiction, the dates of use for each jurisdiction, the person it was named after (if applicable), and the date of renaming. Dates of use will not necessarily correspond with the dates of construction or demolition of a building, as pre-existing structures may be adapted or court use, and former court buildings may later be put to other uses. Also, the official name of the building may be changed at some point after its use as a federal court building has been initiated.

== Courthouses ==
Courthouse	City	Image	Street address	Jurisdiction	Dates of use	Named for
Ewing T. Kerr Federal Building and U.S. Courthouse^{†}	Casper		111 South Wolcott Street	D. Wyo.	1932–present	District Court judge Ewing Thomas Kerr (1992)
Public Building	Cheyenne		?	D. Wyo. 8th Cir.	1905–1933; Razed ca. 1966	n/a
Federal Office Building†	Cheyenne		308 West 21st Street	D. Wyo.	1933–1965; Still in use by various federal agencies.	n/a
Joseph C. O'Mahoney Federal Center†	Cheyenne		2120 Capitol Avenue	D. Wyo.	1965-present	U.S. Senator Joseph C. O'Mahoney
Evanston Main Post Office^{†}	Evanston		221 10th Street	D. Wyo.	1908–ca. 1980	n/a
Clifford P. Hansen Federal Courthouse	Jackson		145 East Simpson Street	D. Wyo.	?–2014; Now owned by Teton County	Governor and U.S. Sen. Clifford Hansen
U.S. Post Office and Courthouse^{†}	Lander		177 North 3rd Street	D. Wyo.	1912–early 1990s Now privately owned.	n/a
U.S. Post Office and Court House	Sheridan		45 East Loucks Street	D. Wyo.	1924–? Now privately owned.	n/a
Yellowstone Justice Center	Yellowstone National Park		105 Mammoth Street	D. Wyo.	2008–present	Yellowstone National Park

== Key ==
^{†}	Listed on the National Register of Historic Places (NRHP)
^{††}	NRHP-listed and also designated as a National Historic Landmark
