= Wyoming Senate Files 12 and 80 2015 'Trespassing To Collect Data' =

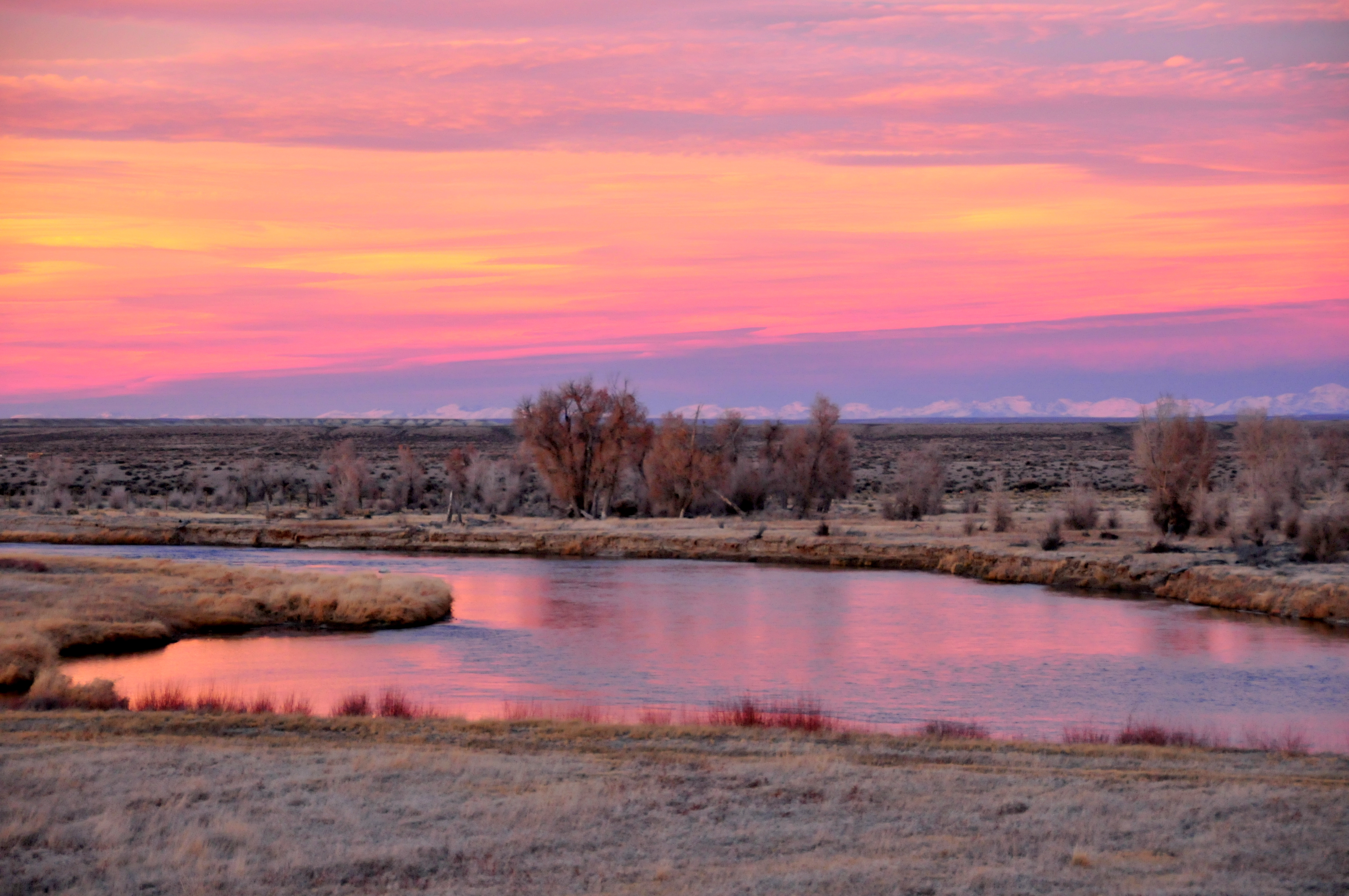
Seedskadee National Wildlife Refuge, Sweetwater County, Wyoming.

In March 2015, the state of Wyoming passed new laws named Senate Files 12 and 80 (SF 12 and SF 80). These laws have the titles: "Trespassing to Collect Data" (SF12) and "Trespassing to collect data- civil cause of action" (SF 80). State Republican Marti Halverson said: "When a person trespasses to collect resource data, that person is not only trespassing - he is stealing data that is the property of the landowner." It might well have created a new category of crime called "data trespass".

In October 2018, a portion of the so-called 'Data Trespass' laws was found to be unconstitutional, violating the First Amendment.

== Background ==
The Idaho-based environmental group Western Watersheds Project (WWP) and its volunteers routinely check rivers for contamination from cow manure. Environmental groups such as WWP are concerned about the bacteria E. coli in streams - typically caused by cow manure.

Property owners say they need protection from trespassing snoops hunting for information - about pollution, perhaps - that could be used to harass them and harm their businesses. Wyoming ranchers and lawmakers allege the WWP has trespassed on private land to collect water quality data to support an agenda of curtailing public lands grazing.

Starting from June 2014, 15 Wyoming ranchers sued Jonathan Ratner and the WWP for allegedly trespassing on private land to access Bureau of Land Management parcels to collect water samples. The ranchers allege that the group submitted water samples to the state that show Ratner has been trespassing. Many of the claims in the lawsuit are derived from plotting the locations of Ratner's samples on a map and trying to deduce how he would have got there. Ratner and Western Watersheds deny every allegation in the ranchers' complaint. In most, they contend, there is an easement on the road that grants the public access to cross private property.

In December 2014, WWP moved to dismiss the above lawsuit that has been filed against it by five Fremont and Sublette county ranch interests. The defendants claim the ranchers: "Have utterly failed to substantiate their claims and the case should be dismissed." The motion also asked the court to dismiss the case because the ranchers' misconduct in violating water quality standards is connected to the matter in litigation, and their motives for bringing the lawsuit against WWP are improper.

In May 2015, WWP tried to persuade a judge to dismiss the property owners' lawsuit against it. A hearing on the motion was held on the in Fremont County District Court in Lander, presided over by Judge Norman E. Young (JNY). The case awaited a ruling from JNY which was expected in the following weeks.

On Friday January 22, 2016 in Lander, JNY heard various legal motions in the case Frank Ranches V. Jonathan Ratner (as above). JNY stated: "I think when we comb through the facts of the case we'll find that Ratner probably trespassed, but when I come to damages... It'll be nominal and that that won't support punitive damages". JNY also stated: "It seems to me that what the plaintiffs really, truly want and what they are truly right to say, is that they don't want Mr. Ratner on their property. That's something that can be accomplished a lot more easily than what we're about to embark upon here." JNY also said that he would rule on the motions in the coming weeks.

The Courthouse News Service writes that the state of Wyoming criminalized the collection of "data" on private and public land, without the consent of the landowner, as a response to the actions of environmentalists.

The U.S. Department of Commerce, Bureau of Economics Analysis, give statistics for 2014 showing that out of a total GDP for Wyoming of 43,800 million dollars, agriculture, forestry, fishing, and hunting contributed 710 million dollars, or approximately 1.6%.

== Senate Bills 12 and 80 Litigation ==
'Trespassing to unlawfully collect resource data; unlawful collection of resource data' became effective on the fifth of March 2015. A first offense is punishable by a fine of up to $1,000. A second offense is punishable by no less than 10 days in jail and up to a year, and a fine of $5,000.

In September 2015, plaintiffs Western Watersheds, National Press Photographers Association (NPPA), Natural Resources Defense Council Inc. (NRDC), People for the Ethical Treatment of Animals Inc. (PETA), and the Center for Food Safety challenged the state of Wyoming for its data trespassing laws passed in the 2015 session.

On the 11th of December 2015, The State of Wyoming defended the Data Trespass Laws in a case to dismiss the September 2015 suit, as above. United States District Court Judge Scott Skavdahl (JSS) presided. Among JSS's queries was the expansiveness of the state's "open land" application to the laws. JSS asked why the term "open land" is spelled out in the law rather than private land. "There must be some intent behind the legislature's distinction".

JSS also asked whether a person could be prosecuted for collecting data on Bureau of Land Management property without first gaining permission. JSS also queried whether a person could be prosecuted if he or she took a picture of private land from Interstate 25.

On the 28th of December 2015, JSS issued an order rejecting the state of Wyoming's motion to dismiss a lawsuit. JSS' findings included that Wyoming's "data trespass" laws may unconstitutionally criminalize activities such as photography on public lands. "At this stage, the Court finds it difficult to conceive a permissible rationale for preventing the collection of resource data on lands which the public has the right to be upon," JSSwrote, in the 38-page order about Case 2:15-cv-00169-SWS. "Nothing indicates this activity is more disruptive, destructive, or problematic than other uses."

JSS also wrote: "Having the right to access the land is not enough to remove the threat of criminal and civil liability under the trespass statutes. The trespass statutes prevent activity on lands even where the public would not be trespassing."

== Portion of data trespass laws judged to be unconstitutional ==
In October 2018, a portion of the so-called Data Trespass laws was found to be unconstitutional, violating the First Amendment. Dated the 29th of October 2018, United States District Judge Scott W. Skavdah wrote in his Conclusion: "The First Amendment's guarantee of free speech in this case leads the Court to find Wyoming statutes §§ 6-3-414(c) and 40-27-101(c) are facially unconstitutional."

Quoting from a Western Watersheds Project article: "By threatening citizens with jail time and civil penalties and singling out for heightened punishment people legally collecting environmental data on public lands, the statutes deterred people from doing their part to hold polluters, employers and corporations accountable."

Michael Wall, litigation director of the Natural Resources Defense Council, said: "The state tried to criminalize environmental advocacy. That's un-American. And as the federal court ruled, it's unconstitutional." David Muraskin, Food Project attorney for Public Justice, said in an interview: "What the decision does really well is make clear that the state can't suppress speech without challenge. It is the state's burden to justify laws squelching speech, and it can't rely on speculation. It needs concrete evidence if it's going to try to limit speech."

No appeal was made by the state of Wyoming. Mary Kay Hill, the governor's chief of staff, said: "There wasn't an awful lot of conversation about that. The governor's position is that if there is a solution that it would be best addressed by the Legislature".

== Laws remain in place ==
Although the portion of the 'data trespass' laws examined by Judge Scott Skavdahl was found to be unconstitutional, the remainder of the laws are still in effect until repealed. This is because of the legal concept of severability: "Wyoming has a presumption in favor of severability; that is that you can strike down one part of the law without striking down the entire thing". Skavdahl could only examine a portion of the law, but could not declare the whole statute unconstitutional or otherwise.

This has left some disagreement about what remains of the 'data trespass' laws. Jim Magagna, executive vice president of the Wyoming Stock Growers Association, stated: "If the trespass and the data collection occur on the same parcel of private land, the law and the much higher penalties still apply". Yet Western Watersheds' state director Jonathan Ratner argued that because the data censorship laws violated the U.S. Constitution, the state or others cannot prosecute people using the laws. But Ratner also stated: "The issue has nothing to do with private lands as is made clear in both rulings. The state's longstanding trespass law makes it illegal to trespass. Nothing has changed regarding that statute."

So the state's existing laws on trespass still remain. On the website Tri-State Livestock News, Harriet Hageman, a water and natural resource attornery, stated: "Landowners continue to have protection from someone coming onto their property without their permission. None of the plaintiffs in that case are entitled to access private property and collect data unless the landowner allows them to do so."

== Senate Bills 12 and 80 External Links ==
- "SENATE FILE NO. SF0012: Trespassing to collect data" (PDF). State of Wyoming. March 2015.
- "ENROLLED ACT NO. 61, SENATE SIXTY-THIRD LEGISLATURE OF THE STATE OF WYOMING 2015 GENERAL SESSION" (PDF). State of Wyoming. March 2015.
- "SENATE FILE NO. SF0080.Trespassing to collect data-civil cause of action" (PDF). State of Wyoming. 2015.
- "ORIGINAL SENATE FILE NO. SF0080. ENROLLED ACT NO. 82, SENATE" (PDF). State of Wyoming. 2015.
- "University of Wyoming Data Trespass FAQ" (PDF). University of Wyoming. 2015.

== See also ==
- Fourteenth Amendment to the United States Constitution
- Clean Water Act
