= Nancy D. Freudenthal =

American judge (born 1954)

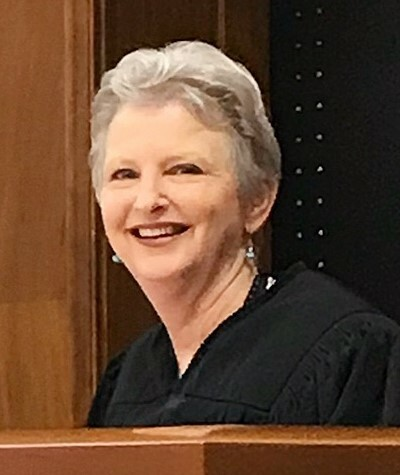

Senior Judge of the United States District Court for the District of Wyoming
- Incumbent
- Assumed office June 1, 2022

Chief Judge of the United States District Court for the District of Wyoming
- In office July 24, 2011 – May 31, 2018
- Preceded by: William F. Downes
- Succeeded by: Scott W. Skavdahl

Judge of the United States District Court for the District of Wyoming
- In office May 6, 2010 – June 1, 2022
- Appointed by: Barack Obama
- Preceded by: Clarence Addison Brimmer Jr.
- Succeeded by: Kelly H. Rankin

First Lady of Wyoming
- In role January 6, 2003 – January 3, 2011
- Governor: Dave Freudenthal
- Preceded by: Sharyn Geringer
- Succeeded by: Carol Mead

Personal details
- Born: Nancy Dell Roan; 1954 (age 71–72) Cody, Wyoming, U.S.
- Spouse: Dave Freudenthal
- Education: University of Wyoming (BA, JD)

Nancy Dell Freudenthal (née Roan, born 1954) is a senior United States district judge of the United States District Court for the District of Wyoming. She is the first female judge to serve in the District of Wyoming. Freudenthal was also the First Lady of Wyoming from January 6, 2003, to January 3, 2011, as the wife of Governor Dave Freudenthal.

== Early life and education ==
Born in 1954, in Cody, Wyoming, Freudenthal earned a Bachelor of Arts degree in 1976 from the University of Wyoming and a Juris Doctor in 1980 from the University of Wyoming College of Law.

== Career ==
From 1980 until 1989, Freudenthal worked in the office of the Wyoming governor as an attorney for intergovernmental affairs. From 1985 to 1986, she was an adjunct professor at the University of Wyoming College of Law. From 1989 to 1991, she served on the Wyoming Tax Commission, and from 1989 until 1995, she was on the board of the Wyoming Board of Equalization. Freudenthal has spent much of her legal career working on energy and environmental issues. In 1995, she took a job as an associate at the Cheyenne, Wyoming law firm of Davis & Cannon. In 1998, she became a partner and held that post until her nomination as a federal judge.

=== Federal judicial service ===
According to the questionnaire that Freudenthal submitted to the United States Senate Committee on the Judiciary, after the election of Barack Obama, Freudenthal's husband, Wyoming Gov. Dave Freudenthal, asked her if she would be interested in serving as a federal district judge for Wyoming. Her husband subsequently—without telling her—submitted three possible nominees to the Obama administration for it to consider nominating: his wife, another attorney, Ford Bussart, and a state district court judge, Norman E. Young. "I thought about that long and hard, and the question really came down to (was) should she be penalized for having married me," Dave Freudenthal told a local newspaper. "And the conclusion I came down to is that all three of them are qualified, and fortunately, it's up to the president and not me."

In August 2009, the United States Department of Justice contacted Nancy Freudenthal about the nomination and she was interviewed by Justice Department lawyers on October 5, 2009. Obama formally submitted her nomination to the United States District Court for the District of Wyoming on December 3, 2009. Freudenthal would fill the vacancy created in 2006 when Judge Clarence Addison Brimmer Jr. assumed senior status. President George W. Bush previously nominated Richard Honaker for the seat, but he never received a hearing on his nomination. The United States Senate Committee on the Judiciary held a hearing on Freudenthal's nomination on January 20, 2010. On May 5, 2010, the United States Senate confirmed Freudenthal by a 96–1 vote. She received her judicial commission on May 6, 2010. Freudenthal served as Chief Judge from July 24, 2011, to May 31, 2018. She assumed senior status on June 1, 2022.

Legal offices
| Preceded by Clarence Addison Brimmer Jr. | Judge of the United States District Court for the District of Wyoming; 2010–2022 | Succeeded by Kelly H. Rankin |
| Preceded by William F. Downes | Chief Judge of the United States District Court for the District of Wyoming; 2011–2018 | Succeeded by Scott W. Skavdahl |
