= Mark Klaassen =

American lawyer (born 1973)

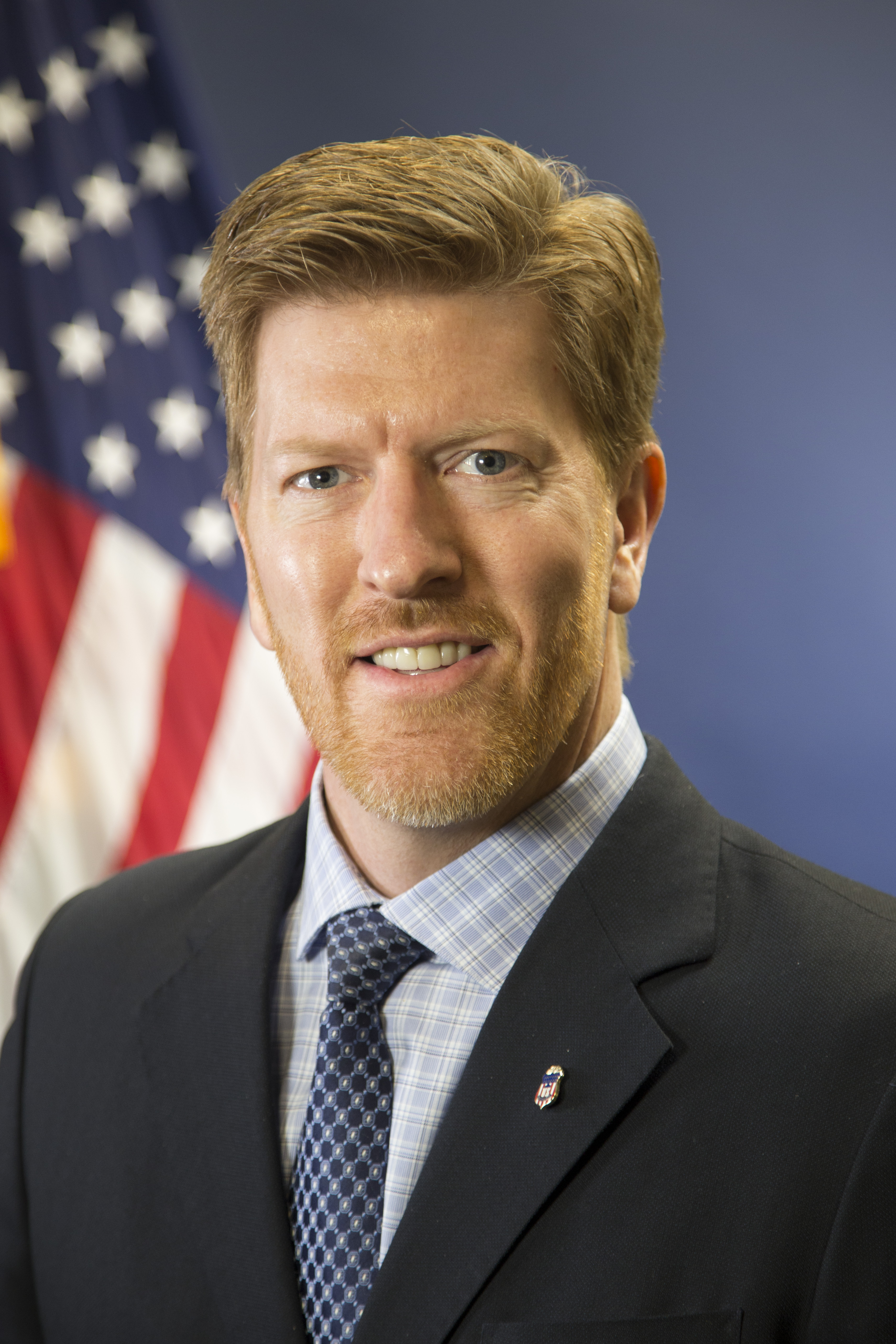

United States Attorney for the District of Wyoming
- In office November 21, 2017 – January 31, 2021
- President: Donald Trump; Joe Biden
- Preceded by: Christopher A. Crofts
- Succeeded by: L. Robert Murray (acting)

Personal details
- Born: Mark Allen Klaassen; April 17, 1973 (age 53) Park Rapids, Minnesota
- Education: Oral Roberts University (BS); Notre Dame Law School (JD)

Mark Allen Klaassen (born April 17, 1973) is an American attorney who served as the United States Attorney in the United States District Court for the District of Wyoming from 2017 to 2021.

Klaassen was raised in Gillette, Wyoming. A graduate of Oral Roberts University and Notre Dame Law School, he clerked for Wade Brorby of the United States Court of Appeals for the Tenth Circuit. Klaassen began his career as an associate at Latham & Watkins. From 2007 to 2009, Klaassen was chief of staff to the general counsel for the United States Department of Homeland Security, and he also served as general counsel for the United States House Committee on Homeland Security from 2003 to 2007. He was formerly an Assistant United States Attorney for the same district prior to his elevation to his current post.

== United States Attorney for the District of Wyoming ==
On August 3, 2017, Donald Trump nominated Klaassen to be United States Attorney for the District of Wyoming. He was confirmed by the United States Senate by voice vote on November 9, 2017, and sworn into office on November 21, 2017. He resigned on January 31, 2021.
