= Uriah Hair House =

Historic house in New York, United States

- U.S. National Register of Historic Places
- Location within New York Location within the United States
- Location: Water St. (Dundee-Himrod Rd.), Dundee, New York
- Coordinates: 42°31′52″N 76°58′32″W
- Area: 7.8 acres (3.2 ha)
- Built: 1850
- Architectural style: Italianate
- MPS: Yates County MPS
- NRHP reference No.: 94000936
- Added to NRHP: August 24, 1994

Uriah Hair House is a historic home located at Dundee in Yates County, New York. It is an Italianate style structure built about 1850.

It was listed on the National Register of Historic Places in 1994.
