= Dundee, New York =

- Village
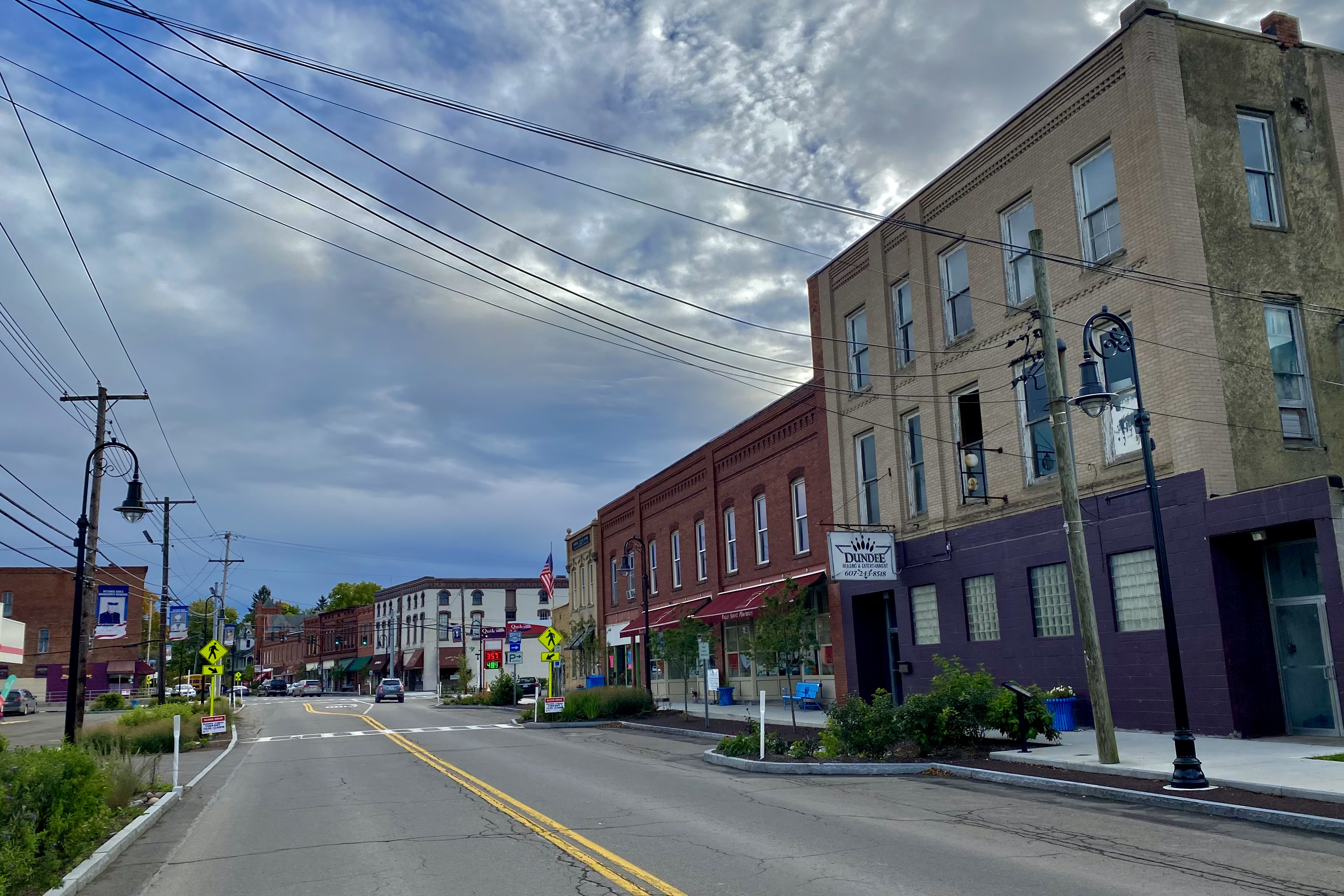
- View along Water Street in October 2022

- Location in Yates County and the state of New York.
- Coordinates: 42°31′28″N 76°58′29″W
- Country: United States
- State: New York
- County: Yates
- Settled: 1807
- Incorporated: 1848
- Named after: Dundee, Scotland

Area
  - Total: 1.10 sq mi (2.85 km^{2})
  - Land: 1.10 sq mi (2.85 km^{2})
  - Water: 0 sq mi (0.00 km^{2})
- Elevation: 980 ft (300 m)

Population (2020)
  - Total: 1,690
  - Density: 1,533.6/sq mi (592.12/km^{2})
- Time zone: UTC-5 (Eastern (EST))
  - Summer (DST): UTC-4 (EDT)
- ZIP code: 14837
- Area code: 607
- FIPS code: 36-21050
- GNIS feature ID: 0948784
- Website: https://dundeevillageny.gov/

Dundee is a village in Yates County, New York, United States. As of the 2020 census, Dundee had a population of 1,690. The name was taken from Dundee, the city in Scotland with a population of 148,260.

The Village of Dundee is in the Town of Starkey. The village is in the Finger Lakes Region of New York, halfway between Watkins Glen and Geneva.

Dundee Airport (D48) is located northeast of the village.

== History ==
The community was known early by the name "Plainview". At first, the village did not thrive due to competition from another neighboring community, "Eddytown", but eventually prevailed over its rival.

Around 1834, residents began to seek a new name for the village and, persuaded by resident James Gifford (a native of Scotland) named the village "Dundee".

In 1859, 1860, and 1861, the village was severely damaged by fires.

Dundee was the original home of Seneca Foods.

The Uriah Hair House, Dundee Methodist Church, First Presbyterian Church, and Dundee Village Historic District are listed on the National Register of Historic Places.

== Geography ==
Dundee is located at 42°31′28″N 76°58′29″W (42.524453, -76.974804).

According to the United States Census Bureau, the village has a total area of 1.1 square miles (2.8 km^{2}), all land.

Seneca Lake, one of the Finger Lakes, is four miles east of Dundee. Big Stream is a stream flowing through the village. "Big Stream" is also known for its seasonal fishing.

Dundee is on New York State Route 14A, a north-south highway. New York State Route 230 terminates at NY-14A west of Dundee.

== Demographics ==
Historical population
Census	Pop.	Note	%±
1860	733		—
1870	730		−0.4%
1880	1,025		40.4%
1890	1,200		17.1%
1900	1,291		7.6%
1910	1,228		−4.9%
1920	1,143		−6.9%
1930	1,086		−5.0%
1940	1,168		7.6%
1950	1,165		−0.3%
1960	1,468		26.0%
1970	1,539		4.8%
1980	1,556		1.1%
1990	1,588		2.1%
2000	1,690		6.4%
2010	1,725		2.1%
2020	1,690		−2.0%
U.S. Decennial Census

As of the census of 2000, there were 1,690 people, 661 households, and 403 families residing in the village. The population density was 1,506.0 inhabitants per square mile (581.5/km^{2}). There were 728 housing units at an average density of 648.7 per square mile (250.5/km^{2}). The racial makeup of the village was 98.11% White, 1.01% African American, Hispanic or Latino of any race 0.65%, 0.47% from two or more races, 0.18% from other races, 0.12% Native American, and 0.12% Asian.

There were 661 households, out of which 34.5% had children under the age of 18 living with them, 40.7% were married couples living together, 15.3% had a female householder with no husband present, and 39.0% were non-families. 32.8% of all households were made up of individuals, and 15.4% had someone living alone who was 65 years of age or older. The average household size was 2.45 and the average family size was 3.07.

In the village, the population was spread out, with 27.6% under the age of 18, 7.0% from 18 to 24, 26.7% from 25 to 44, 21.5% from 45 to 64, and 17.2% who were 65 years of age or older. The median age was 38 years. For every 100 females, there were 88.0 males. For every 100 females age 18 and over, there were 87.9 males.

The median income for a household in the village was $26,034, and the median income for a family was $32,446. Males had a median income of $28,875 versus $20,885 for females. The per capita income for the village was $14,858. About 15.8% of families and 17.0% of the population were below the poverty line, including 22.2% of those under age 18 and 9.5% of those age 65 or over.

== Notable people ==
- Henry Harpending, Anthropologist
- John T. Andrews, former US Congressman
- Harry J. Malony, Major General World War II, commanded the 94th Infantry Div
- Albert D. Walton, former US Attorney
