= John Alden Riner =

American judge (1850–1923)

Senior Judge of the United States District Court for the District of Wyoming
- In office October 31, 1921 – March 4, 1923

Judge of the United States District Court for the District of Wyoming
- In office September 22, 1890 – October 31, 1921
- Appointed by: Benjamin Harrison
- Preceded by: Seat established by 26 Stat. 222
- Succeeded by: Thomas Blake Kennedy

Personal details
- Born: John Alden Riner; October 12, 1850 Preble County, Ohio
- Died: March 4, 1923 (aged 72) Cheyenne, Wyoming
- Education: University of Michigan Law School (LL.B.)

John Alden Riner (October 12, 1850 – March 4, 1923) was a United States district judge of the United States District Court for the District of Wyoming.

== Education and career ==
Born in Preble County, Ohio, Riner received a Bachelor of Laws from the University of Michigan Law School in 1879. He was in private practice in Cheyenne, Wyoming Territory from 1879 to 1884. He was a city attorney for Cheyenne from 1881 to 1884 and the United States Attorney for the Wyoming Territory from 1884 to 1886. He was a member of the Territorial Council for the Wyoming Territory in 1886, returning to private practice in Cheyenne, Wyoming Territory (State of Wyoming from July 10, 1890) from 1886 to 1890.

== Federal judicial service ==
Riner was nominated by President Benjamin Harrison on September 20, 1890, to the United States District Court for the District of Wyoming, to a new seat authorized by 26 Stat. 222. He was confirmed by the United States Senate on September 22, 1890, and received his commission the same day. He assumed senior status on October 31, 1921. He was the last district judge who continued to serve in active service appointed by President Harrison. His service terminated on March 4, 1923, due to his death in Cheyenne.

== See also ==
- List of United States federal judges by longevity of service

== Sources ==
Legal offices
Preceded by Seat established by 26 Stat. 222	Judge of the United States District Court for the District of Wyoming; 1890–1921	Succeeded by Thomas Blake Kennedy
