= Clarence Addison Brimmer Jr. =

American judge and politician (1922–2014)

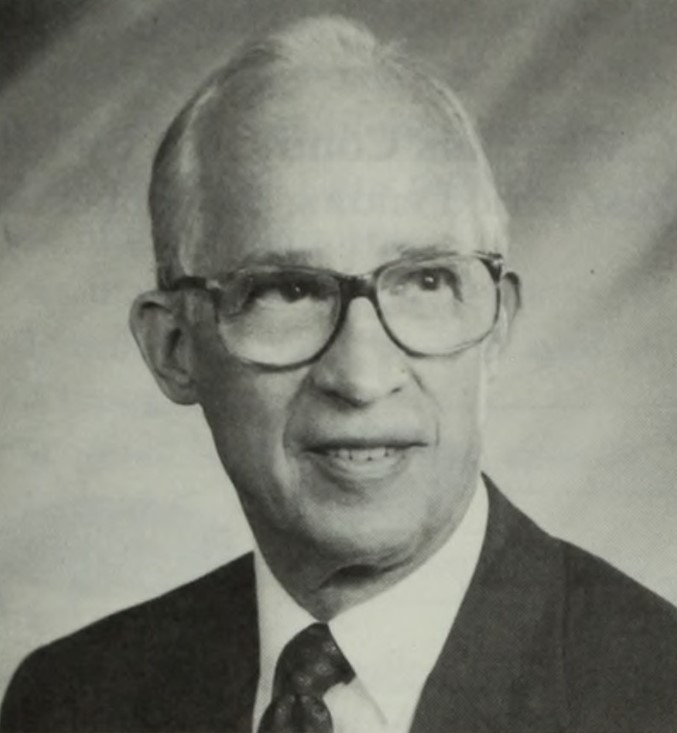
- Brimmer in 1996

Senior Judge of the United States District Court for the District of Wyoming
- In office September 27, 2006 – October 23, 2014

Chief Judge of the United States District Court for the District of Wyoming
- In office 1986–1992
- Preceded by: Office established
- Succeeded by: Alan Bond Johnson

District Judge of the United States District Court for the District of Wyoming
- In office September 16, 1975 – September 27, 2006
- Appointed by: Gerald Ford
- Preceded by: Ewing Thomas Kerr
- Succeeded by: Nancy D. Freudenthal

United States Attorney for the District of Wyoming
- In office 1974–1975
- President: Gerald Ford
- Preceded by: Richard V. Thomas
- Succeeded by: James P. Castburg

23rd Attorney General of Wyoming
- In office 1971–1974
- Governor: Stanley K. Hathaway
- Preceded by: James E. Barrett
- Succeeded by: David B. Kennedy

Chairman of the Wyoming Republican Party
- In office 1967–1971

Personal details
- Born: Clarence Addison Brimmer Jr. July 11, 1922 Rawlins, Wyoming, U.S.
- Died: October 23, 2014 (aged 92) Boulder, Colorado, U.S.
- Party: Republican
- Children: Philip A. Brimmer
- Education: University of Michigan; University of Michigan Law School
- Occupation: Judge

Clarence Addison Brimmer Jr. (July 11, 1922 – October 23, 2014) was an American judge and politician. A member of the Republican Party, he served as attorney general of Wyoming from 1971 to 1974 and as district judge of the United States District Court for the District of Wyoming from 1975 to 2006.

== Life and career ==
Brimmer was born in Rawlins, Wyoming, the son of Clarence Addison Brimmer Sr. and Geraldine Zingsheim. He attended and graduated from Rawlins High School. After graduating, he served in the United States Army Air Corps, during World War II, which after his discharge, he attended the University of Michigan, earning his BA degree in 1944, and was an editor for the university's newspaper The Michigan Daily. After earning his degree, he served as a sergeant in the United States Air Force, which after his discharge, he attended the University of Michigan Law School, earning his J.D. degree in 1947.

Brimmer served as chairman of the Wyoming Republican Party from 1967 to 1971, which after stepping down as chairman, Wyoming governor Stanley K. Hathaway nominated Brimmer to serve as attorney general of Wyoming, serving until 1974, when he was succeeded by David B. Kennedy. After his service as attorney general, he served as the United States attorney for the United States District Court for the District of Wyoming from 1974 to 1975.

Brimmer served as district judge of the United States District Court for the District of Wyoming, succeeding Ewing Thomas Kerr and receiving his commission on September 16, 1975. He assumed senior status on September 27, 2006, when he was succeeded by Nancy D. Freudenthal, and assumed inactive senior status in June 2013.

== Death ==
Brimmer died on October 23, 2014, at the Boulder Community Hospital in Boulder, Colorado, at the age of 92.

== See also ==
- List of United States federal judges by longevity of service

Legal offices
Preceded by James E. Barrett	Attorney General of Wyoming; 1971–1974	Succeeded by David B. Kennedy
Preceded by Ewing Thomas Kerr	Judge of the United States District Court for the District of Wyoming; 1975–2006	Succeeded by Nancy D. Freudenthal
Preceded by Office established	Chief Judge of the United States District Court for the District of Wyoming; 1986–1992	Succeeded by Alan Bond Johnson
