= Terrence L. O'Brien =

American judge (born 1943)

Terrence O'Brien

Senior Judge of the United States Court of Appeals for the Tenth Circuit
- Incumbent
- Assumed office April 30, 2013

Judge of the United States Court of Appeals for the Tenth Circuit
- In office April 16, 2002 – April 30, 2013
- Appointed by: George W. Bush
- Preceded by: Wade Brorby
- Succeeded by: Gregory A. Phillips

Personal details
- Born: Terrence Leo O'Brien; August 8, 1943 (age 82) Lincoln, Nebraska, U.S.
- Education: University of Wyoming (BS, JD)

Terrence Leo O'Brien (born August 8, 1943) is a Senior United States circuit judge of the United States Court of Appeals for the Tenth Circuit.

== Education and career ==
O'Brien was born in Lincoln, Nebraska. He received a Bachelor of Science degree from the University of Wyoming in 1965. He received a Juris Doctor from University of Wyoming Law School in 1972. He was in the United States Army, Ordnance Corps from 1966 to 1969. He was a Staff attorney of Land & Natural Resources Division/Appellate Section, United States Department of Justice from 1972 to 1974. He was in private practice of law in Wyoming from 1974 to 1980. He was a District Judge, Sixth Judicial District Court of Wyoming from 1980 to 2000. He was a President, Visionary Communications, Inc. from 2000 to 2001. He was in private practice of law in Wyoming from 2001 to 2002.

== Federal judicial service ==
O'Brien is a United States Circuit Judge of the United States Court of Appeals for the Tenth Circuit. O`Brien was nominated by President George W. Bush on September 4, 2001, to a seat vacated by Wade Brorby. He was confirmed by the United States Senate by a 98–0 vote on April 15, 2002. He received his commission on April 16, 2002. O'Brien assumed senior status on April 30, 2013.

Legal offices
Preceded by Wade Brorby	Judge of the United States Court of Appeals for the Tenth Circuit; 2002–2013	Succeeded by Gregory A. Phillips
