= Albert D. Walton =

American lawyer

United States Attorney for the District of Wyoming
- In office 1921–1933
- President: Warren G. Harding; Calvin Coolidge; Herbert Hoover
- Preceded by: Charles L. Rigdon
- Succeeded by: Carl L. Sackett

Personal details
- Born: Albert Douglas Walton; February 22, 1886 Dundee, New York, U.S.
- Died: April 3, 1951 (aged 65) Cheyenne, Wyoming, U.S.
- Party: Republican
- Spouse: Harriet G. Lund
- Children: 3
- Education: Dundee Junior-Senior High School (1904); University of Michigan Law School (1907)

Military service
- Allegiance: United States
- Branch/service: Wyoming Army National Guard
- Years of service: 1912–1914
- Rank: First lieutenant

Albert Douglas Walton (born February 22, 1886 – April 3, 1951) was an American attorney who would go on to serve as the United States Attorney in the United States District Court for the District of Wyoming.

== Early life and education ==
Albert D. Walton was born in Dundee, New York, on February 22, 1886. Albert was the youngest of four children and as a teenager he worked with his father on their family farm. He graduated from the high school of Dundee, New York, in 1904. Determined to work as a lawyer he enrolled in University of Michigan Law School, where he received his LL.B. degree, and graduated from Ann Arbor in the class of 1907.

== Law career and politics ==
After graduating, he was then admitted to practice law in Michigan and New York and began practicing as a member of the firm of Gridley & Walton in Penn Yan, New York, where he remained until 1910. In April 1910, he became a resident of Wyoming and passed the Wyoming bar exam. He was a candidate for prosecuting attorney of Laramie county in 1912 and in 1914 was again made the republican candidate but was defeated by a small margin. Walton served as the city attorney, of Cheyenne, his term covering the years from 1918 to 1920. He would serve on the republican state committee for over 20 years. He also was the United States Attorney for the District of Wyoming for over 13 years.

== Personal life ==
On June 23, 1915, Walton married Harriet G. Lund, together they had 3 children.

Walton served in the military as a first lieutenant of the Wyoming National Guard. He was commissioned on November 30, 1912, becoming a first lieutenant on July 18, 1913, and served with that rank until February, 1914, when he resigned.

Walton was a know Mason, he was also helped with the Young Men's Literary Club and with the Commercial Club.
