= William F. Downes =

American judge (born 1946)

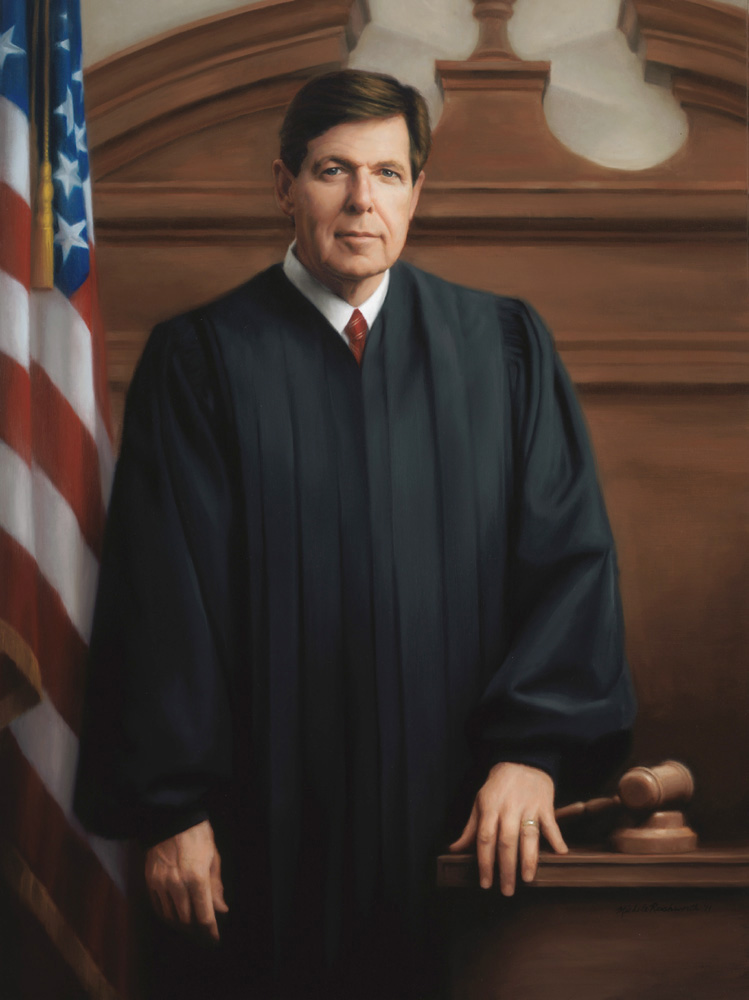
- Official Portrait of Judge Wm. F. Downes by Michele Rushworth

Chief Judge of the United States District Court for the District of Wyoming
- In office 1999–2011
- Preceded by: Alan Bond Johnson
- Succeeded by: Nancy D. Freudenthal

Judge of the United States District Court for the District of Wyoming
- In office June 16, 1994 – July 24, 2011
- Appointed by: Bill Clinton
- Preceded by: Seat established by 104 Stat. 5089
- Succeeded by: Scott W. Skavdahl

Personal details
- Born: July 24, 1946 (age 79) Boston, Massachusetts, U.S.
- Education: University of North Texas (BA); University of Houston Law Center (JD)

William Francis Downes (born July 24, 1946) is a retired United States district judge of the United States District Court for the District of Wyoming.

== Education and career ==
Born in Boston, Massachusetts, Downes received a Bachelor of Arts degree from the University of North Texas in 1968 and served in the United States Marine Corps from 1968 to 1971. He received a Juris Doctor from the University of Houston Law Center in 1974. He was in private practice in Green River, Wyoming, from 1975 to 1978 and in Casper, Wyoming, from 1978 to 1994.

== Federal judicial service ==
On May 5, 1994, Downes was nominated by President Bill Clinton to a new seat on the United States District Court for the District of Wyoming created by 104 Stat. 5089. He was confirmed by the United States Senate on June 15, 1994, and received his commission on June 16, 1994. He became chief judge in 1999 and retired in 2011. His official portrait was painted by artist Michele Rushworth and hangs in the federal courthouse in Cheyenne, Wyoming.

Legal offices
Preceded by Seat established by 104 Stat. 5089	Judge of the United States District Court for the District of Wyoming; 1994–2011	Succeeded by Scott W. Skavdahl
Preceded by Alan Bond Johnson	Chief Judge of the United States District Court for the District of Wyoming; 1999–2011	Succeeded by Nancy D. Freudenthal
