= United States District Court for the District of Wyoming =

United States federal district court of Wyoming

Coordinates: 41.137°N 104.819°W

- (D. Wyo.)
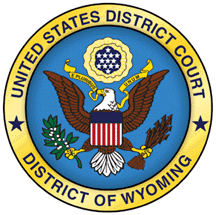
- Location: Cheyenne More locations: Casper; Mammoth; Jackson; Evanston; Lander; Sheridan
- Appeals to: Tenth Circuit
- Established: July 10, 1890
- Judges: 3
- Chief Judge: Kelly H. Rankin

Officers of the court
- U.S. Attorney: Darin Smith (interim)
- U.S. Marshal: Randall P. Huff
- www.wyd.uscourts.gov

The United States District Court for the District of Wyoming (in case citations, D. Wyo.) is the federal district court whose jurisdiction comprises the state of Wyoming and those portions of Yellowstone National Park situated in Montana and Idaho; it is the only federal court district that includes portions of more than one state, creating a possible "Zone of Death" where it would be difficult to prosecute crimes. (Note: Two other federal district courts do hold jurisdiction over territory outside of their state but within a US territory instead of another state: the District Court of Hawaii holds jurisdiction within the state of Hawaii and the United States Minor Outlying Islands in the Pacific Ocean. Additionally, the US territory of American Samoa has no federal district court or territorial court, and federal cases are heard by either American Samoa's local High Court, the District Court of Hawaii, or District Court for DC.) The court has locations in Cheyenne and Casper.

Appeals from this court are heard by the United States Court of Appeals for the Tenth Circuit (except for patent claims and claims against the U.S. government under the Tucker Act, which are appealed to the Federal Circuit).

The United States Attorney's Office for the District of Wyoming represents the United States in civil and criminal litigation in the court. As of August 11, 2025, the acting United States attorney is Darin Smith.

== Current judges ==
As of June 1, 2025:

#	Title	Judge	Duty station	Born	Term of service			Appointed by
#	Title	Judge	Duty station	Born	Active	Chief	Senior	Appointed by
9	Chief Judge	Kelly H. Rankin	Cheyenne	1967	2024–present	2025–present	—	Biden
5	District Judge	Alan Bond Johnson	Cheyenne	1939	1985–present	1992–1999	—	Reagan
8	District Judge	Scott W. Skavdahl	Casper	1966	2011–present	2018–2025	—	Obama
7	Senior Judge	Nancy D. Freudenthal	Cheyenne	1954	2010–2022	2011–2018	2022–present	Obama

== Former judges ==
#	Judge	Born–died	Active service	Chief Judge	Senior status	Appointed by	Reason for termination
1	John Alden Riner	1850–1923	1890–1921	—	1921–1923	B. Harrison	death
2	Thomas Blake Kennedy	1874–1957	1921–1955	—	1955–1957	Harding	death
3	Ewing Thomas Kerr	1900–1992	1955–1975 (Note: Recess appointment; formally nominated on January 12, 1956, confirmed by the United States Senate on March 1, 1956, and received commission on March 2, 1956)	—	1975–1992	Eisenhower	death
4	Clarence Brimmer Jr.	1922–2014	1975–2006	1986–1992	2006–2014	Ford	death
6	William F. Downes	1946–present	1994–2011	1999–2011	—	Clinton	retirement

== Chief judges ==
Chief judges have administrative responsibilities with respect to their district court. Unlike the Supreme Court, where one justice is specifically nominated to be chief, the office of chief judge rotates among the district court judges. To be chief, a judge must have been in active service on the court for at least one year, be under the age of 65, and have not previously served as chief judge.

A vacancy is filled by the judge highest in seniority among the group of qualified judges. The chief judge serves for a term of seven years, or until age 70, whichever occurs first. The age restrictions are waived if no members of the court would otherwise be qualified for the position.

When the office was created in 1948, the chief judge was the longest-serving judge who had not elected to retire, on what has since 1958 been known as senior status, or declined to serve as chief judge. After August 6, 1959, judges could not become or remain chief after turning 70 years old. The current rules have been in operation since October 1, 1982.

== Zone of death ==
Law professor Brian C. Kalt has argued that it may be impossible to impanel a jury in compliance with the Vicinage Clause of the Sixth Amendment to the United States Constitution for a crime committed solely in the Idaho portion of Yellowstone National Park (and that it would be difficult to do so for a crime committed solely in the Montana portion). This has been referred to as the Zone of Death.

== Succession of seats ==
Seat 1
Seat established on July 10, 1890 by 26 Stat. 222
Riner	1890–1921
Kennedy	1921–1955
Kerr	1955–1975
Brimmer, Jr.	1975–2006
Freudenthal	2010–2022
Rankin	2024–present

Seat 2
Seat established on July 10, 1984 by 98 Stat. 333
Johnson	1985–present

Seat 3
Seat established on December 1, 1990 by 104 Stat. 5089
Downes	1994–2011
Skavdahl	2011–present

== United States attorneys for the District of Wyoming ==
U.S. attorneys for Wyoming including the Wyoming Territory:

Name	Term started	Term ended	Presidents served under
Joseph M. Carey	1869	1871	Ulysses S. Grant
John James Jenkins	1876	1880	Ulysses S. Grant and Rutherford B. Hayes
Anthony C. Campbell	1885	1890	Grover Cleveland and Benjamin Harrison
Benjamin F. Fowler	1890	1894	Benjamin Harrison
Gibson Clark	1894	1898	Grover Cleveland and William McKinley
Benjamin M. Ausherman	1898	1907	William McKinley and Theodore Roosevelt
Timothy F. Burke	1907	1911	Theodore Roosevelt and William Howard Taft
Hillard S. Ridgely	1911	1914	William Howard Taft and Woodrow Wilson
Charles L. Rigdon	1914	1921	Woodrow Wilson
Albert D. Walton	1921	1933	Warren G. Harding, Calvin Coolidge and Herbert Hoover
Carl L. Sackett	1933	1949	Franklin D. Roosevelt and Harry Truman
John Coleman Pickett	1949	1949	Harry Truman
John J. Hickey	1949	1953	Harry Truman
John F. Raper	1953	1961	Dwight D. Eisenhower
Robert N. Chaffin	1961	1969	John F. Kennedy and Lyndon B. Johnson
Richard V. Thomas	1969	1974	Richard Nixon
Clarence Addison Brimmer Jr.	1974	1975	Gerald Ford
James P. Castberg	1975	1977	Gerald Ford
Toshiro Suyematsu	1977	1977	Gerald Ford
Charles E. Graves	1977	1981	Jimmy Carter
Toshiro Suyematsu	1981	1981	Jimmy Carter
Richard A. Stacy	1981	1994	Ronald Reagan, George H. W. Bush and Bill Clinton
Dave Freudenthal	1994	2001	Bill Clinton and George W. Bush
Matt Mead	2001	2007	George W. Bush
John R. Green	2007	2008	George W. Bush
Kelly H. Rankin	2008	2009	George W. Bush and Barack Obama
Christopher A. Crofts	2010	2017	Barack Obama
Mark Klaassen	2017	2021	Donald Trump and Joe Biden
L. Robert Murray	2021	2022	Joe Biden
Nicholas Vassallo	2022	2024	Joe Biden
Eric Heimann	2024	present	Joe Biden and Donald Trump

== See also ==
- Courts of Wyoming
- List of current United States district judges
- List of United States federal courthouses in Wyoming
- United States Court of Appeals for the Tenth Circuit
