= James E. Barrett =

American judge (1922–2011)

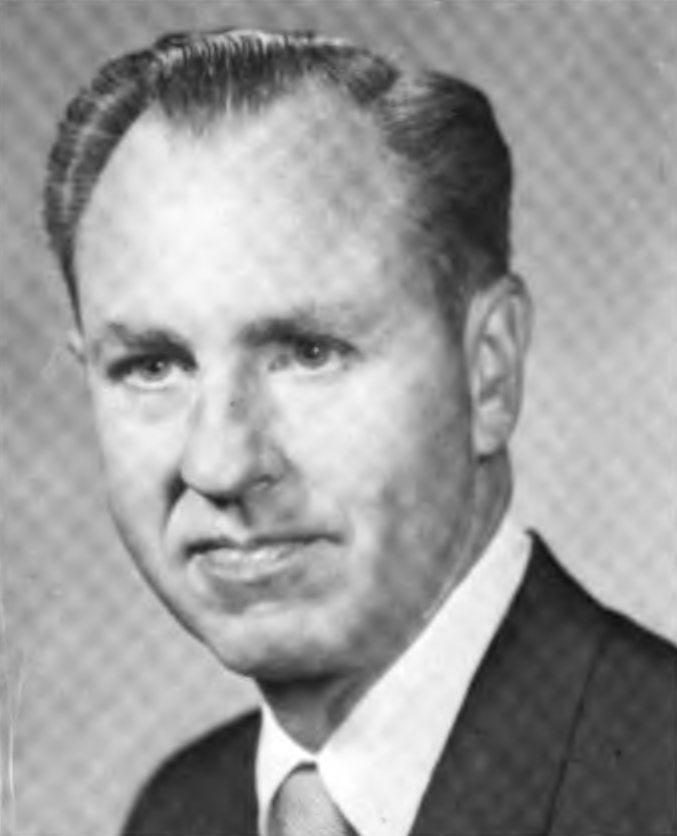

Senior Judge of the United States Court of Appeals for the Tenth Circuit
- In office April 8, 1987 – November 7, 2011

Judge of the United States Foreign Intelligence Surveillance Court of Review
- In office May 19, 1979 – May 18, 1984
- Appointed by: Warren E. Burger
- Preceded by: Seat established
- Succeeded by: Edward Skottowe Northrop

Judge of the United States Court of Appeals for the Tenth Circuit
- In office April 23, 1971 – April 8, 1987
- Appointed by: Richard Nixon
- Preceded by: Joe Hickey
- Succeeded by: Wade Brorby

22nd Attorney General of Wyoming
- In office 1967–1971
- Governor: Stanley K. Hathaway
- Preceded by: Dean W. Borthwick
- Succeeded by: Clarence Brimmer

Personal details
- Born: James Emmett Barrett; April 8, 1922 Lusk, Wyoming, U.S.
- Died: November 7, 2011 (aged 89) Cheyenne, Wyoming, U.S.
- Party: Republican
- Education: University of Wyoming College of Law (LLB)

James Emmett Barrett (April 8, 1922 – November 7, 2011) was a United States circuit judge of the United States Court of Appeals for the Tenth Circuit.

== Education and career ==
Barrett was born in Lusk, Wyoming to Frank A. Barrett and Alice Catherine Donoghue Barrett. He graduated from Niobrara County High School in Lusk in 1940. As a teenager he wrote for the "Lusk Herald" and The Denver Post. He served in the United States Army during World War II from 1942 to 1945, where he participated in the Invasion of Normandy. He was assigned to the Headquarters Detachment of the 1st Army and 3rd Army and achieved the rank of corporal. After the war, he attended Catholic University of America in Washington, DC for six months. He entered law school in the fall of 1946, he went to University of Wyoming College of Law and received a Bachelor of Laws in 1949.

He was in private practice in Lusk from 1949 to 1967, serving as a prosecuting attorney in Lusk from 1951 to 1962, and as a town attorney from 1954 to 1956. He was secretary-treasurer of Niobrara County Republican Central Committee from 1950 to 1966, and the attorney for the Niobrara Consolidated School District from 1952 to 1962. He became the Wyoming Attorney General from 1967 to 1971.

== Federal judicial service ==
On March 25, 1971, Barrett was nominated by President Richard Nixon to a seat on the United States Court of Appeals for the Tenth Circuit vacated by Judge Joe Hickey. Barrett was confirmed by the United States Senate on April 21, 1971, and received his commission on April 23, 1971. He served as a Judge of the United States Foreign Intelligence Surveillance Court of Review from May 19, 1979, to May 18, 1984. Barrett had a reputation as a staunch conservative and dissented when the Court found that an Oklahoma law banning teachers from publicly supporting gay rights was unconstitutional. Barret called homosexual conduct “unnatural and detestable” and said that advocacy of it was less deserving of Constitutional protection than “advocacy of violence, sabotage, and terrorism.” He assumed senior status on April 8, 1987, serving in that status until his death.

== Family life ==
Barrett's father, Frank A. Barrett, was a member of the United States House of Representatives, United States Senate, and the 21st governor of Wyoming. Barrett was married to Carmel Ann Martinez Barrett and they had three children.

== Death ==
Barrett died on November 7, 2011, in Cheyenne, Wyoming. He is interred at Lusk Cemetery in Lusk, Wyoming.

Legal offices
Preceded by Joe Hickey	Judge of the United States Court of Appeals for the Tenth Circuit; 1971–1987	Succeeded by Wade Brorby
Preceded by Seat established	Judge of the United States Foreign Intelligence Surveillance Court of Review; 1979–1984	Succeeded by Edward Skottowe Northrop
