= Ewing Thomas Kerr =

American judge (1900–1992)

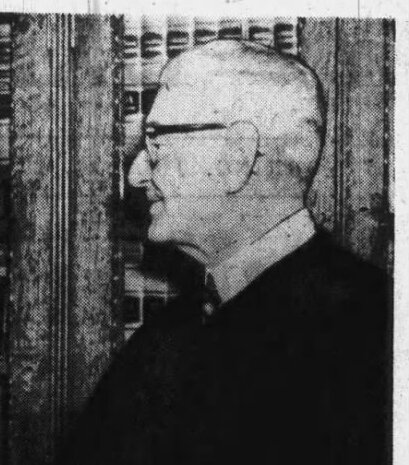

Senior Judge of the United States District Court for the District of Wyoming
- In office September 26, 1975 – July 1, 1992

Judge of the United States District Court for the District of Wyoming
- In office October 22, 1955 – September 26, 1975
- Appointed by: Dwight D. Eisenhower
- Preceded by: Thomas Blake Kennedy
- Succeeded by: Clarence Addison Brimmer Jr.

Attorney General of Wyoming
- In office 1939–1943
- Governor: Nels H. Smith
- Preceded by: Ray E. Lee
- Succeeded by: Louis O'Marr

Personal details
- Born: Ewing Thomas Kerr; January 21, 1900 Bowie, Texas, U.S.
- Died: July 1, 1992 (aged 92)
- Education: University of Colorado Boulder; University of Oklahoma (B.A.); University of Central Oklahoma (B.S.) read law

Military service
- Allegiance: United States
- Branch/service: United States Army
- Years of service: 1943–1946
- Rank: Major

Ewing Thomas Kerr (January 21, 1900 – July 1, 1992) was a United States district judge of the United States District Court for the District of Wyoming. He was also a major in the US Army from 1943 and 1946.

== Education and career ==
Born in Bowie, Texas, Kerr attended the University of Colorado Boulder and received a Bachelor of Arts degree from the University of Oklahoma in 1923 and a Bachelor of Science degree from University of Central Oklahoma in 1923. He read law to enter the bar in 1927. He was in private practice in Cheyenne, Wyoming from 1927 to 1929. He was an Assistant United States Attorney for the District of Wyoming from 1930 to 1933. He was the Attorney General of Wyoming from 1939 to 1943, and an attorney for the Wyoming Senate in 1943. He was in the United States Army from 1943 to 1946 and became a major. During World War II, he served in the Allied Command in Italy and became head of the legal division in that region. In 1945, he reorganized the civilian courts in Austria.

== Federal judicial service ==
On October 22, 1955, Kerr received a recess appointment from President Dwight D. Eisenhower to a seat on the United States District Court for the District of Wyoming vacated by Judge Thomas Blake Kennedy. Formally nominated to the same seat by President Eisenhower on January 12, 1956, he was confirmed by the United States Senate on March 1, 1956, and received his commission the following day. He was a member of the Judicial Conference of the United States from 1962 to 1964. He assumed senior status on September 26, 1975. Kerr served until his death on July 1, 1992.

== Honor ==
The Ewing T. Kerr Federal Building and U.S. Courthouse in Casper, Wyoming, was named in Kerr's honor.

== Sources ==
Legal offices
Preceded by Ray E. Lee	Attorney General of Wyoming; 1939–1943	Succeeded by Louis O'Marr
Preceded by Thomas Blake Kennedy	Judge of the United States District Court for the District of Wyoming; 1955–1975	Succeeded by Clarence Addison Brimmer Jr.
