= Christopher A. Crofts =

American lawyer (born 1942)

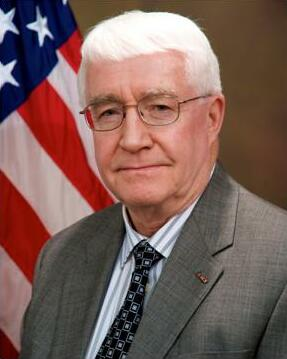

United States Attorney for the District of Wyoming
- In office January 4, 2010 – March 10, 2017
- President: Barack Obama; Donald Trump
- Preceded by: Kelly H. Rankin
- Succeeded by: Mark Klaassen

Personal details
- Born: April 19, 1942 (age 84) Lander, Wyoming, U.S.
- Party: Democratic
- Education: University of Wyoming

Christopher A. Crofts (born April 19, 1942) is an American attorney who served as the United States Attorney for the District of Wyoming from 2010 to 2017.

== See also ==
- 2017 dismissal of U.S. attorneys
