= Kelly H. Rankin =

American judge (born 1967)

Kelly Rankin
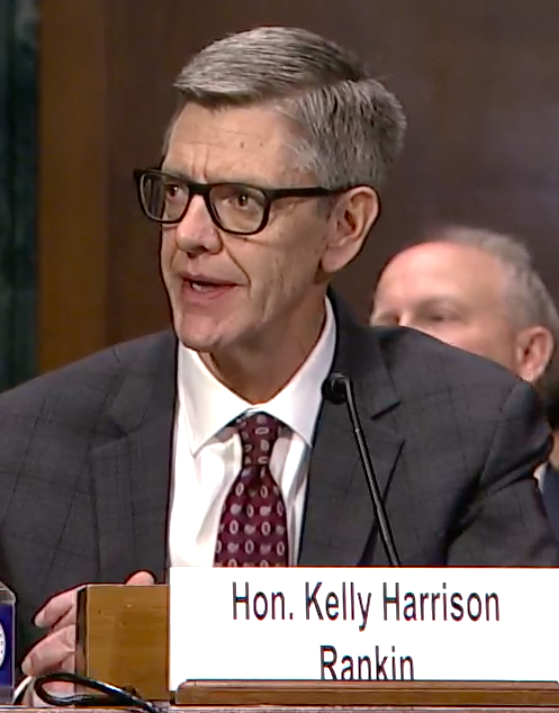
- Rankin at his 2024 confirmation hearing

Chief Judge of the United States District Court for the District of Wyoming
- Incumbent
- Assumed office June 1, 2025
- Preceded by: Scott W. Skavdahl

Judge of the United States District Court for the District of Wyoming
- Incumbent
- Assumed office March 12, 2024
- Appointed by: Joe Biden
- Preceded by: Nancy D. Freudenthal

United States Attorney for the District of Wyoming
- In office 2008–2009
- President: George W. Bush; Barack Obama
- Preceded by: John Green
- Succeeded by: Christopher A. Crofts

Personal details
- Born: Kelly Harrison Rankin; 1967 (age 58–59) Sheridan, Wyoming, U.S.
- Party: Republican
- Education: University of Wyoming (BS, JD)

Kelly Harrison Rankin (born 1967) is an American lawyer who is serving as the chief United States district judge of the United States District Court for the District of Wyoming. He previously served as the United States attorney for that district court from 2008 to 2009 as well as the chief United States magistrate judge of the same court from 2012 to 2024.

== Education ==
Rankin received a Bachelor of Science from the University of Wyoming in 1990 and a Juris Doctor from the University of Wyoming College of Law in 1994.

== Career ==
From 1994 to 1995, Rankin was a deputy county attorney in the Lincoln County Attorney's Office. From 1995 to 1998, he was a deputy county attorney in the Park County Attorney's Office and from 1999 to 2003, he served as the Park County Attorney. From 2003 to 2008, he served as an assistant United States attorney in the District of Wyoming. From 2008 to 2010, he served as the United States attorney for the District of Wyoming and then served as counsel to Wyoming Governor Dave Freudenthal in 2010. From 2010 to 2012, he served as criminal chief in the U.S. Attorney's Office for the District of Wyoming. On June 7, 2012, he assumed office as a United States magistrate judge for the District of Wyoming and was chief magistrate judge from 2012 to 2014.

=== Federal judicial service ===
On December 19, 2023, President Joe Biden announced his intent to nominate Rankin to serve as a United States district judge of the United States District Court for the District of Wyoming. His nomination received support from Senators John Barrasso and Cynthia Lummis. On January 10, 2024, his nomination was sent to the Senate. President Biden nominated Rankin to the seat vacated by Judge Nancy D. Freudenthal, who assumed senior status on June 1, 2022. On January 24, 2024, a hearing on his nomination was held before the Senate Judiciary Committee. On February 29, 2024, his nomination was reported out of committee by a 20–1 vote. On March 7, 2024, the United States Senate confirmed his nomination by voice vote. He received his judicial commission on March 12, 2024.

== Electoral history ==
1998 election for County and Prosecuting Attorney, Park County
Party	Candidate	Votes	%
Republican	Kelly Rankin	8,579	96.5
Write-in		309	3.5
Total votes		8,888	100

2002 election for County and Prosecuting Attorney, Park County
Party	Candidate	Votes	%
Republican	Kelly Rankin	8,891	100
Total votes		8,891	100

Legal offices
Preceded by Nancy D. Freudenthal	Judge of the United States District Court for the District of Wyoming; 2024–present	Incumbent
Preceded by Scott W. Skavdahl	Chief Judge of the United States District Court for the District of Wyoming; 2025–present	Incumbent
