= Michele Rushworth =

American painter

Michele Rushworth is an American artist noted for her oil-based portrait paintings. She has painted the official portraits of leading figures in government, law, education, medicine and the arts, including nine state gubernatorial portraits as well as private portraits for families. In 2010 she was commissioned to paint the official portrait of Coast Guard Commandant Admiral Thad Allen and was awarded the commission to paint the official portrait of Admiral Robert J. Papp Jr. She has also been commissioned to paint the official portraits of United States Secretary of Commerce Gary Locke and a portrait of the Chief of Staff of the United States Air Force General Norton Schwartz which was unveiled at the Pentagon in early 2013.

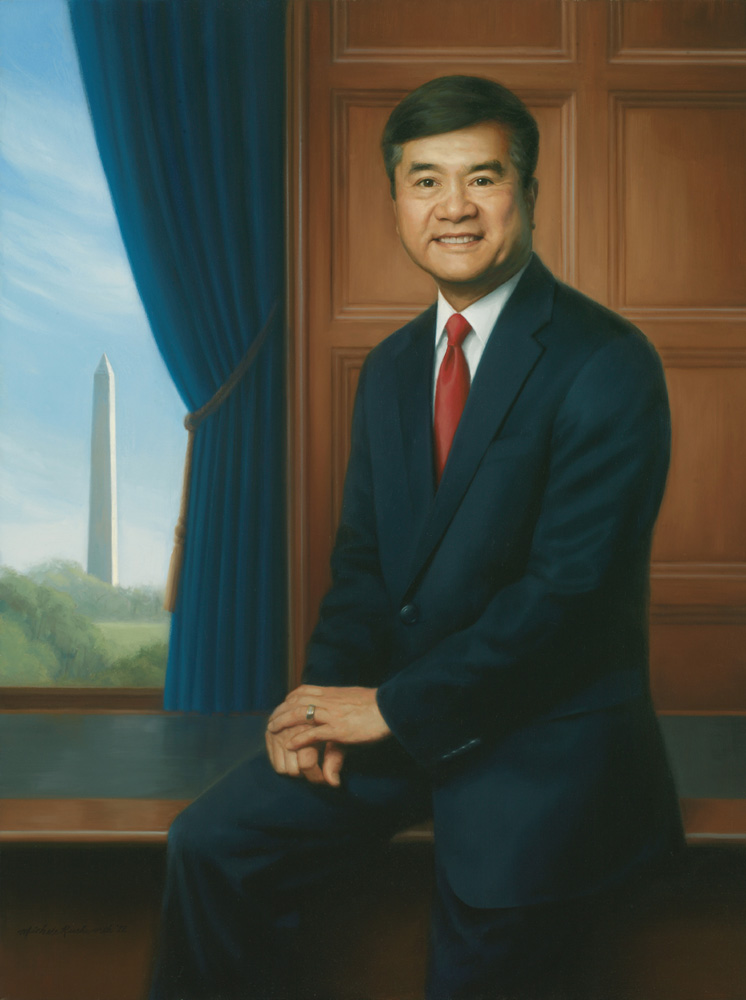
Gary Locke's official portrait for the U.S. Department of Commerce was painted by Michele Rushworth

== Background ==
Rushworth has been a professional artist working in watercolor, pastel and oils for over 25 years, painting portraits, landscapes and still lifes. She began concentrating on painting official and family portrait commissions in oils in 2001.

In September 2002 the CBS news morning show The Early Show hosted a segment with Michele Rushworth and Suzanne Oelschlager, widow of New York City firefighter Douglas Oelschlager who died in the attacks of September 11, 2001. During the interview Suzanne Oelschlager told host Jane Clayson that the portrait that Rushworth donated to her family “is something that my entire family is going to cherish forever.”

In 2006, the Seattle Times wrote a feature article about Rushworth and quoted Washington State Capitol Museum Director Derek Valley saying that her portrait of Washington State Governor Gary Locke "captures Governor Locke at his best".

The Las Vegas Weekly in 2006 quoted Teresa Moiola, Director of Marketing and Public Information for the Nevada Department of Cultural Affairs, as saying that Michelle Rushworth “is an exemplary painter, perhaps one of the stellar artists of our country” in a reference to the official portraits Rushworth painted of Nevada Governors Kenny Guinn and Jim Gibbons.

American Artist Magazine wrote “In the span of seven years Michele Rushworth has gone from having little to no commission work to being one of the most reputable professional portraitists today" and called her “one of the most successful portrait painters in the country today.”

In a 2011 article in Barron's about portraiture, Rushworth was said to "produce realistic paintings rich with color", and the article referred to “the clean style of Michele Rushworth.”

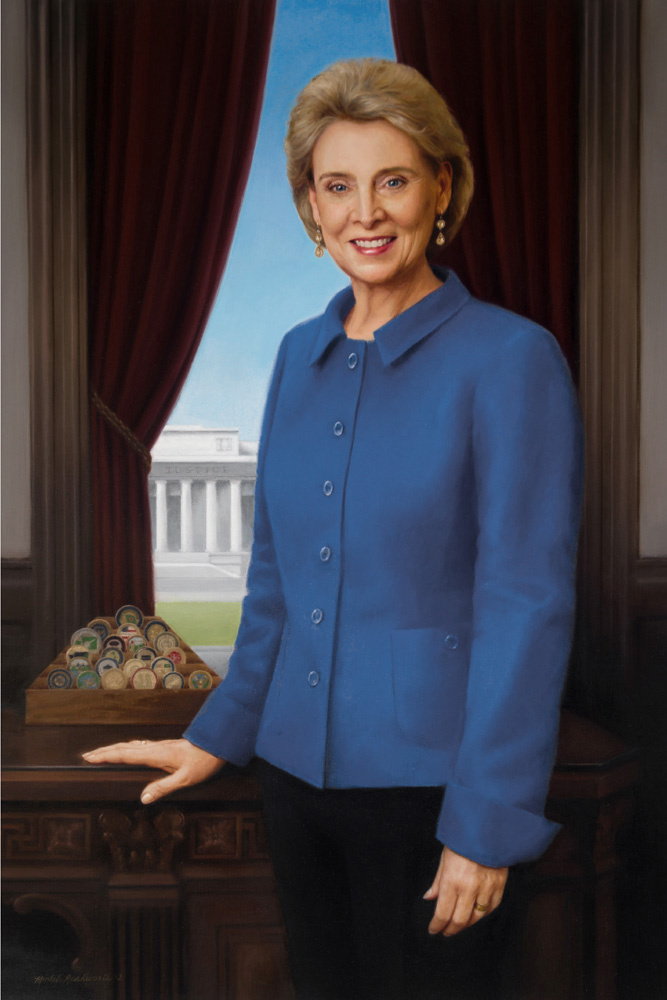
Christine Gregoire's official portrait for the Washington State Capitol building was painted by Michele Rushworth

== Major projects and events ==
=== Portrait of the Chief of Staff of the United States Air Force ===
Rushworth's portrait of former Air Force Chief of Staff General Norton A. Schwartz was unveiled at the Pentagon on January 8, 2013. He is depicted against a night sky to symbolize his time in Special Operations and is shown next to the Air Force Memorial lighted up at night. Also present at the unveiling event were Secretary of the Air Force Michael B. Donley and Deputy Secretary of Defense Ashton Carter.

=== U.S. Secretary of Commerce portrait ===
The official portrait of Commerce Secretary Gary Locke was unveiled in Washington, D.C., on September 13, 2012. Also in attendance at the event were Secretary of Transportation Ray LaHood, former Commerce Secretary John Bryson, current acting Secretary of Commerce Rebecca Blank and former Speaker of the House of Representatives Tom Foley.

=== Wyoming governors’ portrait project ===
One of Rushworth's largest portrait projects consisted of painting five gubernatorial portraits in a project sponsored by the Wyoming State Legislature to fill in the gaps in their collection of paintings of the former Governors of Wyoming.

In 2008 Rushworth painted portraits of Governors Clifford P. Hansen, James E. Geringer and Michael J. Sullivan. A year later Rushworth was commissioned to paint the official portraits of Wyoming Governors Bryant Butler Brooks and Lester C. Hunt. The five Wyoming gubernatorial portraits that Rushworth painted were unveiled in ceremonies presided over by then-current Wyoming Governor Dave Freudenthal held in the state capitol building in Cheyenne in 2008 and 2010 and were attended by the former governors themselves, their family members and descendants. The portraits were then exhibited at the Historical Governor's Mansion in Cheyenne, Wyoming.

=== United States Coast Guard ===
Rushworth's portrait of United States Coast Guard Admiral Thad Allen was unveiled in the Officer's Club at Fort McNair in Washington, D.C., and was displayed at his Change of Command Ceremony on May 25, 2010. The event was attended by 2,000 people including United States Secretary of Defense Robert Gates and United States Secretary of Homeland Security Janet Napolitano.

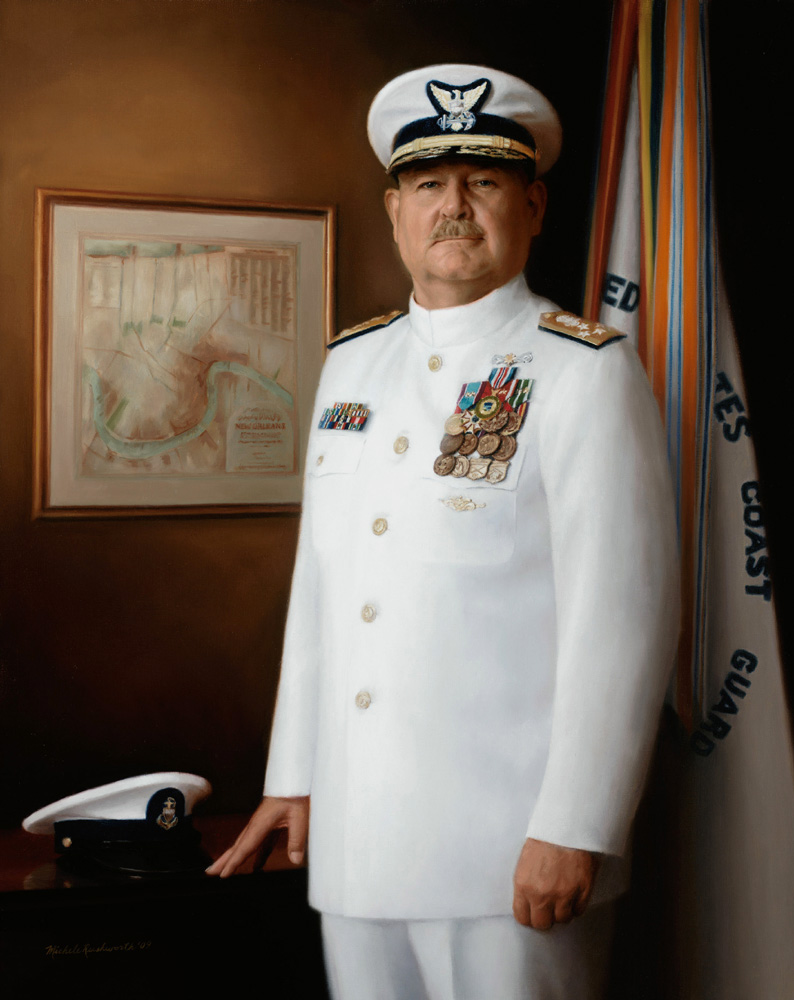
Admiral Thad Allen official U.S. Coast Guard portrait painting by Michele Rushworth

Rushworth has also been commissioned to create the official portrait of current Coast Guard Commandant Admiral Robert J. Papp Jr.

=== Seattle Symphony Orchestra ===
In 2011 the Seattle Symphony commissioned Rushworth to paint a full-length portrait of retiring music director and Conductor Gerard Schwarz, to commemorate his 26 years with the orchestra. The portrait was unveiled at Benaroya Hall to honor Schwarz’ illustrious career.

=== United States District Court ===
Rushworth painted the official portraits of United States District Judges Alan Bond Johnson, William F. Downes, and Sam Sparks. Her portrait of Judge Sparks was unveiled on December 2, 2011, in an event held in the Ceremonial Courtroom of the Federal Courthouse in Austin, Texas. The ceremony was presided over by Chief Justice the Honorable Samuel Frederick Biery Jr. Several hundred people attended the proceedings, including twelve federal judges and a ceremonial color guard. The event included a pre-recorded videotaped speech by retired Supreme Court Justice Sandra Day O’Connor.

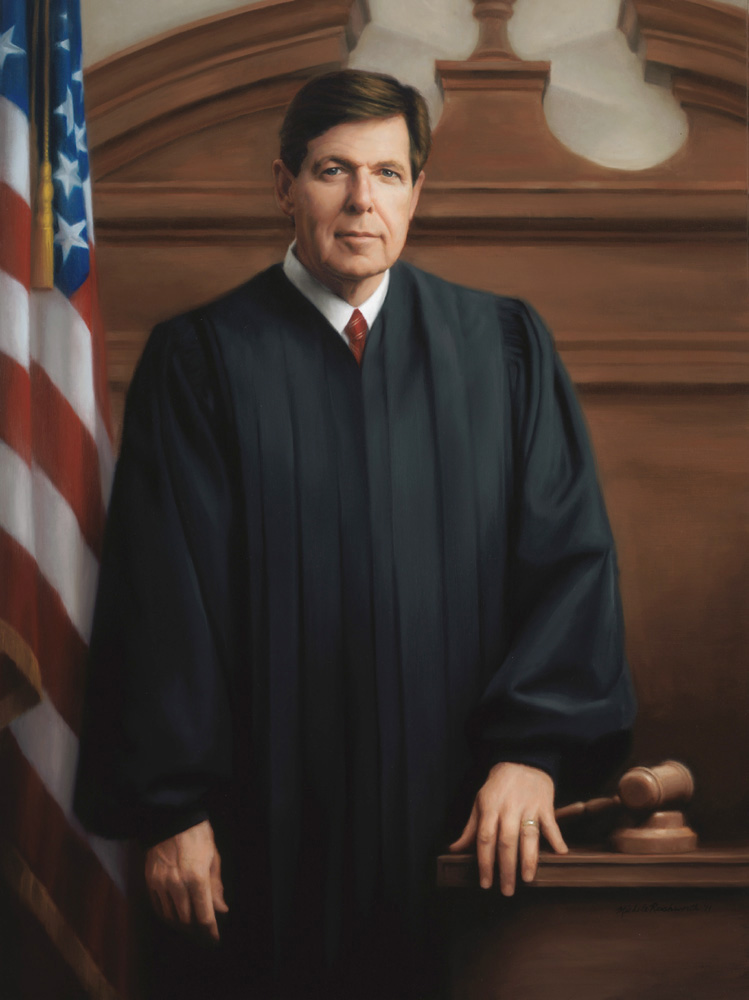
William F. Downes's official portrait for the Cheyenne Federal Courthouse was painted by Michele Rushworth
