= Thomas Blake Kennedy =

American judge (1874–1957)

Senior Judge of the United States District Court for the District of Wyoming
- In office November 6, 1955 – May 21, 1957

Judge of the United States District Court for the District of Wyoming
- In office October 25, 1921 – November 6, 1955
- Appointed by: Warren G. Harding
- Preceded by: John Alden Riner
- Succeeded by: Ewing Thomas Kerr

Personal details
- Born: Thomas Blake Kennedy; April 4, 1874 Commerce, Michigan
- Died: May 21, 1957 (aged 83) Cheyenne, Wyoming
- Education: Franklin College (A.B., A.M.); Syracuse University College of Law (LL.B.)

Thomas Blake Kennedy (April 4, 1874 – May 21, 1957) was a United States district judge of the United States District Court for the District of Wyoming.

== Education and career ==
Born in Commerce, Michigan, Kennedy received an Artium Baccalaureus degree from Franklin College (now Muskingum University) in New Athens, Ohio in 1895, a Bachelor of Laws from Syracuse University College of Law in 1897, and an Artium Magister degree from Franklin College in 1898. He was in private practice in Syracuse, New York from 1898 to 1901, and then in Cheyenne, Wyoming until 1921. He was a Referee in Bankruptcy for the United States District Court for the District of Wyoming from 1903 to 1913 and from 1919 to 1921.

== Federal judicial service ==
On October 17, 1921, Kennedy was nominated by President Warren G. Harding to a seat on the United States District Court for the District of Wyoming vacated by Judge John Alden Riner. Kennedy was confirmed by the United States Senate on October 25, 1921, and received his commission the same day. He assumed senior status on November 6, 1955, serving in that capacity until his death on May 21, 1957, in Cheyenne.

== See also ==
- List of United States federal judges by longevity of service

== Sources ==
Legal offices
Preceded by John Alden Riner	Judge of the United States District Court for the District of Wyoming; 1921–1955	Succeeded by Ewing Thomas Kerr
