= Carl L. Sackett =

American lawyer (1876-1972)

Carl Leroy Sackett
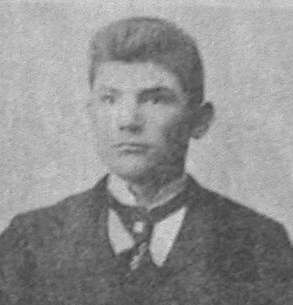

United States Attorney for the District of Wyoming
- In office 1933–1949
- President: Franklin D. Roosevelt; Harry Truman
- Preceded by: Albert D. Walton
- Succeeded by: John Coleman Pickett

Personal details
- Born: Carl Leroy Sackett; February 27, 1876 Red Willow County, Nebraska, U.S.
- Died: December 4, 1972 (aged 96) Cheyenne, Wyoming, U.S.
- Party: Democratic
- Education: Ohio State University

Carl Leroy Sackett (born February 27, 1876 – December 4, 1972) was an American attorney son of John Henry Sackett and Martha Ann "Mattie" Burd, was born in Driftwood Township, Red Willow County, Nebraska. He would go on to serve as the United States Attorney in the United States District Court for the District of Wyoming.

== Legal career ==
After graduating from Ohio State, Carl began practicing law. For over 30 years, Carl lived at West Works Street, Sheridan, Wyoming, and was recorded as a self employed lawyer working from home. Carl was listed in the Cheyenne City Directory in the 1930s and 1940s as US district attorney. In the early 1930s he was vice-president of the Sheridan Trust and Savings Bank. In 1970 he was Wyoming's oldest practicing lawyer.

== Marriage ==
He first married in Sheridan, Wyoming, on May 3, 1905, to Ann Maude Ivey the daughter of John Ivey and Ann Gidley. Ann was born in Mineral Point, Iowa County, Wisconsin, in 1875 and died on 8 May 1910. He married a second time in Warsaw, Kosciusko County, Indiana, on May 1, 1914, to Margaret Hall Woods, the daughter of James Foster Woods and Jemima Hall. Margaret was born in Warsaw on 30 July 1882. She died at 87 in Cheyenne on 24 June 1970 two years before her husband.
