= Alan Bond Johnson =

American judge (born 1939)

Chief Judge of the United States District Court for the District of Wyoming
- In office 1992–1999
- Preceded by: Clarence Addison Brimmer Jr.
- Succeeded by: William F. Downes

Judge of the United States District Court for the District of Wyoming
- Incumbent
- Assumed office December 17, 1985
- Appointed by: Ronald Reagan
- Preceded by: Seat established by 98 Stat. 333

Magistrate Judge of the United States District Court for the District of Wyoming
- In office 1971–1974

Personal details
- Born: January 14, 1939 (age 87) Cheyenne, Wyoming, U.S.
- Education: Vanderbilt University (BA); University of Wyoming (JD)

Alan Bond Johnson (born January 14, 1939) is a United States district judge of the United States District Court for the District of Wyoming.

== Education and career ==
Johnson was born in Cheyenne, Wyoming. He received a Bachelor of Arts degree from Vanderbilt University in 1961 and a Juris Doctor from the University of Wyoming College of Law in 1964. He was in the United States Air Force from 1964 to 1967, and then in private practice in Cheyenne from 1968 to 1971. Johnson was then a United States magistrate judge for the District of Wyoming from 1971 to 1974. He joined the Wyoming Air National Guard in 1973. Johnson was a substitute judge of the Municipal Court of Cheyenne, Wyoming from 1973 to 1974, and a judge on the Wyoming state district court from 1974 to 1985.

=== Federal judicial service ===
On October 22, 1985, Johnson was nominated by President Ronald Reagan to a new seat on the United States District Court for the District of Wyoming created by 98 Stat. 333. He was confirmed by the United States Senate on December 16, 1985, and received his commission on December 17, 1985. He served as chief judge from 1992 to 1999.

== Portrait ==
Johnson's official portrait was painted by artist Michele Rushworth and was unveiled and installed in the federal courthouse in Cheyenne, Wyoming in 2012.

== See also ==
- List of United States federal judges by longevity of service

== Sources ==
Legal offices
Preceded by Seat established by 98 Stat. 333	Judge of the United States District Court for the District of Wyoming; 1985–present	Incumbent
Preceded by Clarence Addison Brimmer Jr.	Chief Judge of the United States District Court for the District of Wyoming; 1992–1999	Succeeded by William F. Downes
