= Richard V. Thomas =

American judge (1932–2010)

Richard Van Thomas

Associate Justice of the Wyoming Supreme Court
- In office December 1974 – February 2001
- Appointed by: Stanley K. Hathaway

United States Attorney for the District of Wyoming
- In office 1969–1974
- President: Richard Nixon
- Preceded by: Robert N. Chaffin
- Succeeded by: Clarence Addison Brimmer Jr.

Personal details
- Born: October 11, 1932 Superior, Wyoming, U.S.
- Died: September 4, 2010 (aged 77) Rio Rancho, New Mexico, U.S.
- Party: Republican
- Education: University of Wyoming (BA, LLB); New York University (LLM)
- Profession: Attorney

Richard Van Thomas (October 11, 1932 – September 4, 2010) was an American attorney and jurist who served as a justice of the Wyoming Supreme Court from December 1974 until his retirement in February 2001. He served as chief justice from 1985 to 1986.

== Background ==
Born in Superior, Wyoming, he received his undergraduate degree from the University of Wyoming, and his law degree from the University of Wyoming College of Law, followed by an LL.M. in tax law from the New York University School of Law.

== Career ==
He returned to Wyoming serving in the Judge Advocate General's Corps for three years, worked in a law firm for a decade, and serving as the United States Attorney for the District of Wyoming for five years. Governor Stanley K. Hathaway appointed Thomas to the state supreme court in 1974. Thomas was described by a colleague as "one of the more cerebral justices this court has ever seen," and as "congenial and hardworking".

== Personal life ==
After retiring from the Wyoming Supreme Court, Thomas relocated to Rio Rancho, New Mexico. He died there in 2010.
