= Wade Brorby =

American judge (born 1934)

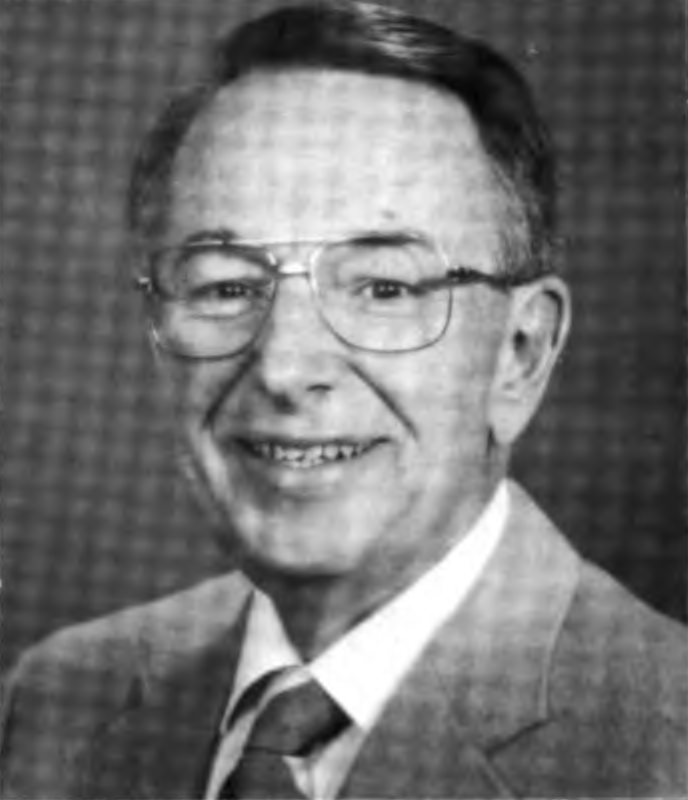

Senior Judge of the United States Court of Appeals for the Tenth Circuit
- Incumbent
- Assumed office May 25, 2001

Judge of the United States Court of Appeals for the Tenth Circuit
- In office February 17, 1988 – May 25, 2001
- Appointed by: Ronald Reagan
- Preceded by: James E. Barrett
- Succeeded by: Terrence L. O'Brien

Personal details
- Born: John Wade Brorby; May 23, 1934 (age 91) Omaha, Nebraska, U.S.
- Education: University of Wyoming (BS, JD)

John Wade Brorby (born May 23, 1934) is an inactive senior United States circuit judge of the United States Court of Appeals for the Tenth Circuit.

== Education and career ==
Born in Omaha, Nebraska, Brorby received a Bachelor of Science degree from the University of Wyoming in 1956 and a Juris Doctor from the University of Wyoming College of Law in 1958. While at Wyoming, he was in the Air Force ROTC. Following law school he served in the United States Air Force from 1958 to 1961, attaining the rank of captain and serving in the Judge Advocate General's Corps. He then practiced law in Gillette, Wyoming from 1961 to 1988 and served as county and prosecuting attorney of Campbell County, Wyoming from 1963 to 1970.

== Federal judicial service ==
On August 7, 1987, Brorby was nominated by President Ronald Reagan to a seat on the United States Court of Appeals for the Tenth Circuit vacated by Judge James E. Barrett. Brorby was confirmed by the United States Senate on February 16, 1988, and received his commission on February 17, 1988. He assumed senior status on May 25, 2001. His seat was subsequently filled by Terrence L. O'Brien of Wyoming, nominated by President George W. Bush and confirmed in 2002.

== Sources ==
Legal offices
Preceded by James E. Barrett	Judge of the United States Court of Appeals for the Tenth Circuit; 1988–2001	Succeeded by Terrence L. O'Brien
