= Dundee United Methodist Church =

Historic church in New York, United States

- Dundee Methodist Church
- U.S. National Register of Historic Places
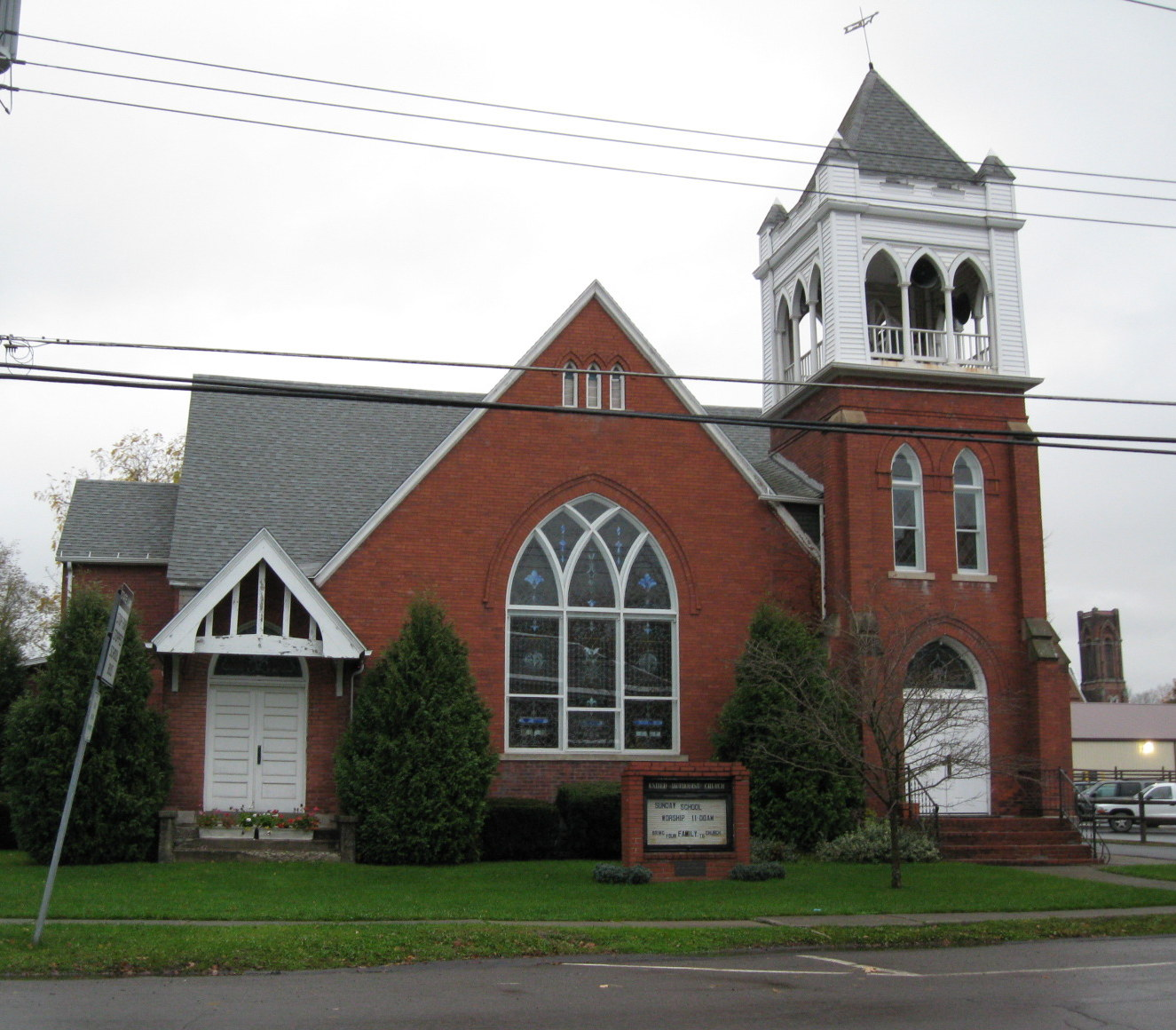
- Dundee Methodist Church, October 2009

- Location within New York Location within the United States
- Location: 35 Water St., Dundee, New York
- Coordinates: 42.5244°N 76.9765°W
- Area: less than one acre
- Built: 1899
- Architect: Pierce & Bickford
- Architectural style: Gothic Revival
- NRHP reference No.: 04001445
- Added to NRHP: January 5, 2005

Dundee United Methodist Church is a historic Methodist church located at Dundee in Yates County, New York. It is a Gothic Revival style brick and frame structure built in 1899. The entrance features a paneled double door surmounted by a large, stained glass, Gothic arched transom light trimmed with splayed brick lintels. It was listed on the National Register of Historic Places in 2004.
