= Richard Honaker =

American politician (born 1951)

Member of the Wyoming House of Representatives from Wyoming
- In office 1987 - 1993

Personal details
- Born: March 10, 1951 (age 75) Laramie, Wyoming, U.S.
- Party: Democratic
- Education: Harvard College (BA); University of Wyoming College of Law (JD)
- Profession: Lawyer

Richard Honaker (born March 10, 1951) is a former Democratic member of the Wyoming House of Representatives, representing Sweetwater County from 1987 to 1993. He was later nominated by President George W. Bush to be a district judge for Wyoming in 2008, but he never came for a vote.
