= Scott W. Skavdahl =

American judge (born 1966)

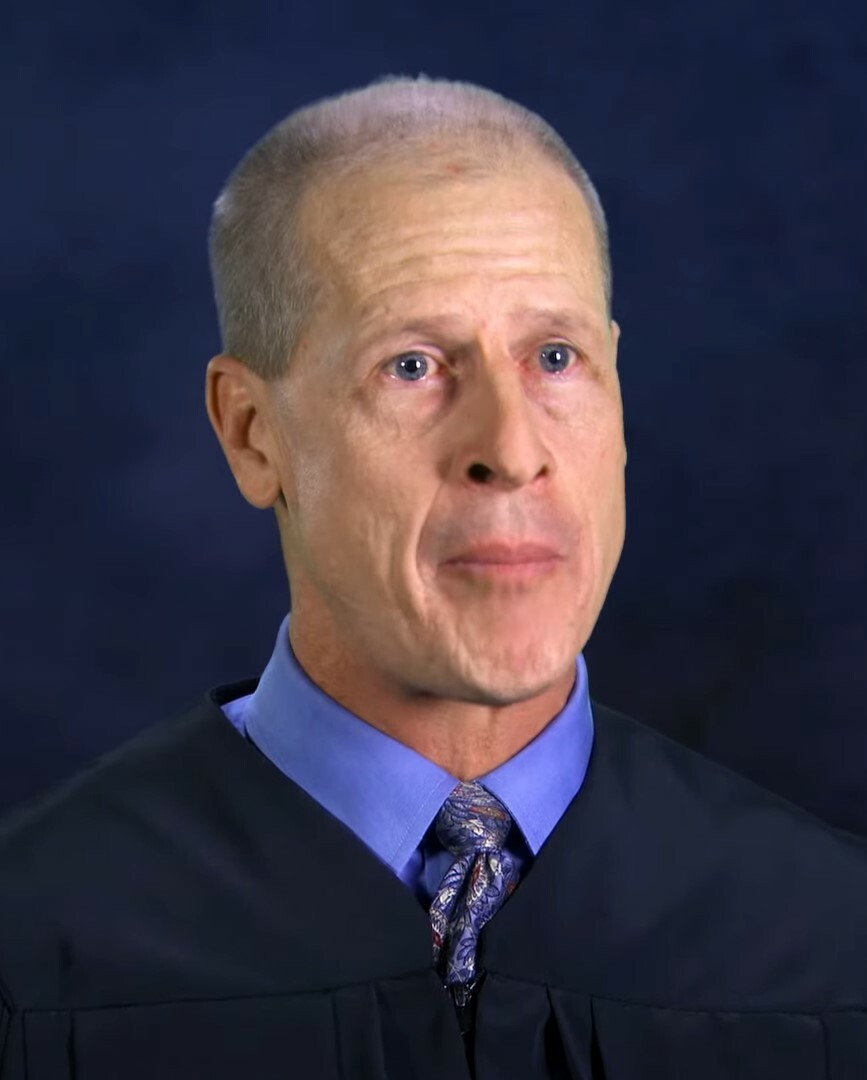
- Skavdahl in 2021

Chief Judge of the United States District Court for the District of Wyoming
- In office June 1, 2018 – June 1, 2025
- Preceded by: Nancy D. Freudenthal
- Succeeded by: Kelly H. Rankin

Judge of the United States District Court for the District of Wyoming
- Incumbent
- Assumed office November 7, 2011
- Appointed by: Barack Obama
- Preceded by: William F. Downes

Magistrate Judge of the United States District Court for the District of Wyoming
- In office 2011 – November 7, 2011
- In office 2001–2003

Personal details
- Born: Scott Wesley Skavdahl; 1966 (age 59–60) Lincoln, Nebraska, U.S.
- Education: University of Wyoming (BS, JD)

Scott Wesley Skavdahl (born 1966) is a United States district judge of the United States District Court for the District of Wyoming.

== Biography ==
Born in Lincoln, Nebraska, graduating high school at Sioux County High School, Skavdahl received his Bachelor of Science degree in 1989 from the University of Wyoming. He received his Juris Doctor in 1992 from the University of Wyoming College of Law. At the University of Wyoming, Skavdahl was an active member of the Pi Kappa Alpha Fraternity. Skavdahl worked as a litigation associate at Brown & Drew (now Brown, Drew & Massey) from 1992 to 1994. From 1994 to 1997, Skavdahl served as a judicial law clerk to Chief Judge William F. Downes of the United States District Court for the District of Wyoming. From 1997 to 2003, Skavdahl worked at the law firm of Williams, Porter, Day & Neville. From 2001 to 2003 he worked as a part-time United States magistrate judge. In 2003, Skavdahl became a judge on the Seventh Judicial District Court, in Casper, Wyoming upon appointment by Governor Dave Freudenthal. On January 31, 2011 Skavdahl left the state bench to once more become a full-time United States magistrate judge.

=== Federal judicial service ===
In November 2010, Governor Dave Freudenthal recommended Skavdahl to fill the Wyoming vacancy that was to be created when Judge William F. Downes retired on July 24, 2011. On February 16, 2011, President Barack Obama formally nominated Skavdahl. On September 8, 2011, the Senate Judiciary Committee reported his nomination to the Senate floor by a voice vote. On November 3, 2011, the Senate confirmed him by a 96–0 vote. He received his commission on November 7, 2011. He became chief judge on June 1, 2018, succeeding Nancy D. Freudenthal and serving until June 1, 2025.

=== Notable case ===
In a June 21, 2016, decision, Skavdahl held that Congress did not authorize the Bureau of Land Management to regulate hydraulic fracturing. The BLM's "Oil and Gas; Hydraulic Fracturing on Federal and Indian Lands; Final Rule" (43 CFR Part 3160) sought to set standards for wellbore construction, chemical disclosure, and water management for hydraulic fracturing on federal and tribal lands. He rejected the BLM's reliance on longstanding land management statutes as authorizing the rule. Instead, he looked to the statute that regulated hydraulic fracturing in its 2005 Energy Policy Act. There, Congress deprived the Environmental Protection Agency from regulating hydraulic fracturing under the Safe Drinking Water Act (SDWA) except when diesel fuels are used. The court reasoned that Congress had not indirectly conferred far broader authority on the BLM via general land management statutes than it had given directly on the EPA.

Legal offices
Preceded by William F. Downes	Judge of the United States District Court for the District of Wyoming; 2011–present	Incumbent
Preceded by Nancy D. Freudenthal	Chief Judge of the United States District Court for the District of Wyoming; 2018–2025	Succeeded by Kelly H. Rankin
