= First Presbyterian Church (Dundee, New York) =

Historic church in New York, United States

- U.S. National Register of Historic Places
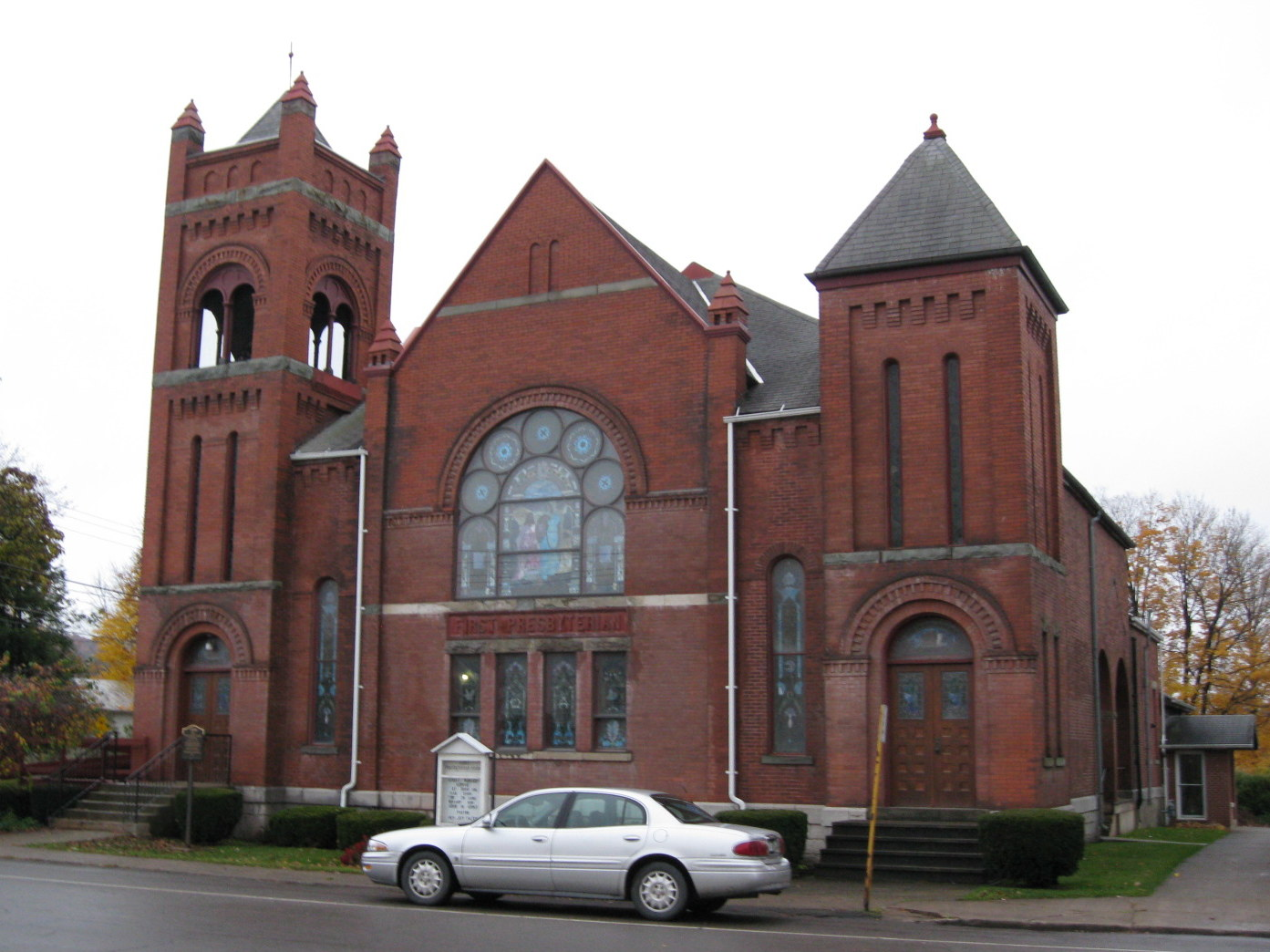
- First Presbyterian Church, October 2009

- Location within New York Location within the United States
- Location: 31 Main St., Dundee, New York
- Coordinates: 42°31′28″N 76°58′37″W
- Area: less than one acre
- Built: 1895
- Architect: Tuthill, H.T. & Son; Pierce, William
- Architectural style: Romanesque
- NRHP reference No.: 04001058
- Added to NRHP: September 24, 2004

First Presbyterian Church is a historic Presbyterian church located at Dundee in Yates County, New York. It is a Romanesque style brick structure, with limestone and terra cotta trim, built in 1895. It is distinguished by two multi-story towers, broad cross gables, bold, turret-like pinnacles and finials, and finely crafted corbelled brock trim.

It was listed on the National Register of Historic Places in 2004.
