= Ewing T. Kerr Federal Building and U.S. Courthouse =

- Casper Federal Building
- U.S. National Register of Historic Places
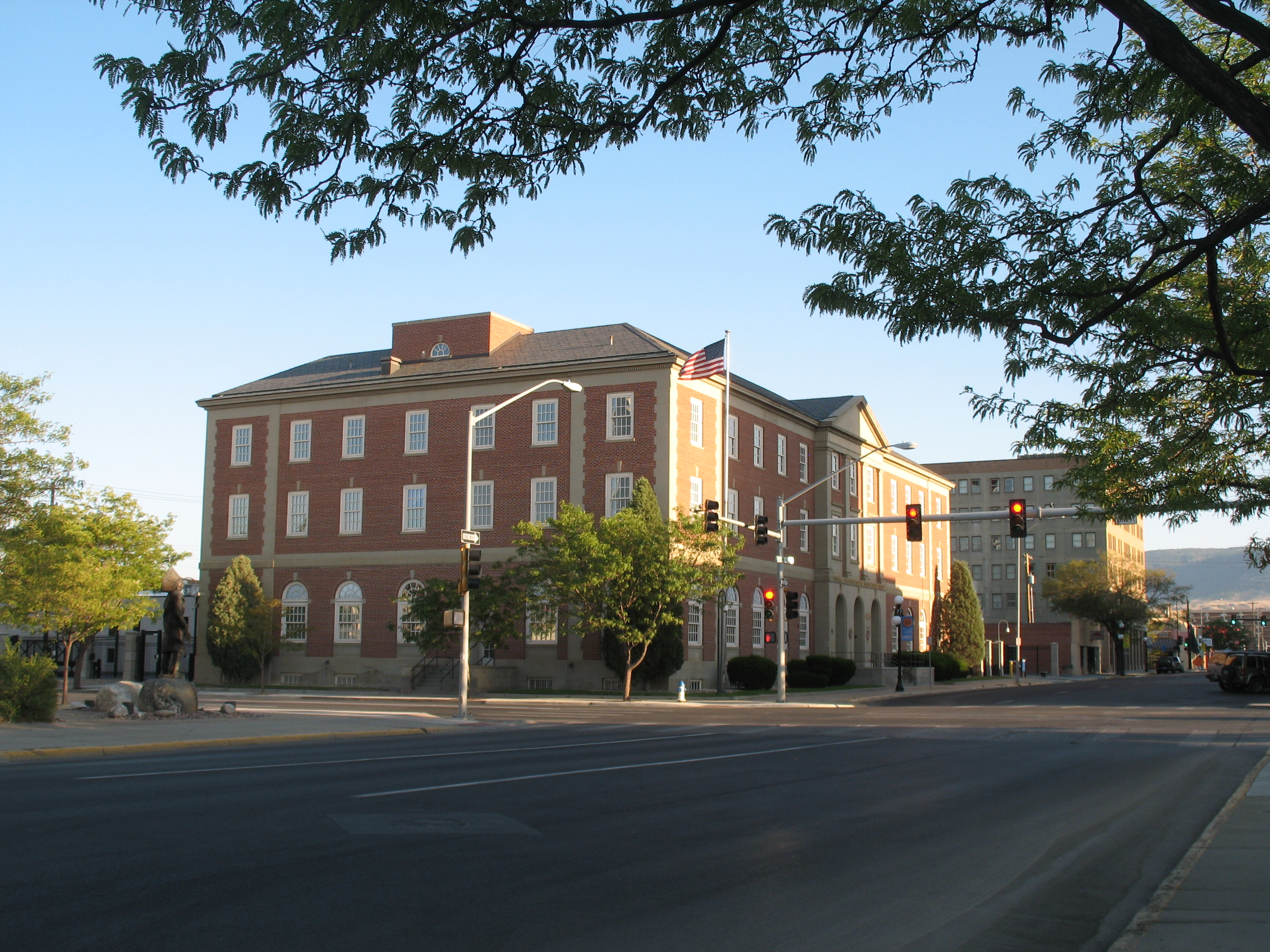

- Location within Wyoming
- Location: 111 S. Wolcott St., Casper, Wyoming
- Coordinates: 42°50′59″N 106°19′22″W
- Area: 0.7 acres (0.28 ha)
- Built: 1932
- Architect: James A. Wetmore
- Architectural style: Classical Revival
- NRHP reference No.: 98001536
- Added to NRHP: December 21, 1998

The Casper Federal Building, at 111 South Wolcott Street in Casper, Wyoming, was built in 1932. It is now known as the Ewing T. Kerr Federal Building and U.S. Courthouse. It was listed on the National Register of Historic Places in 1998.

It is a Classical Revival-style building designed by architect James A. Wetmore.

It is a three-story 158 by 87 feet (48 m × 27 m)-plan building built of reinforced concrete and brick tiles, faced with red pressed brick and sandstone. It has a hipped roof of slate tiles.
