= Wyoming's at-large congressional district =

At-large U.S. House district for Wyoming

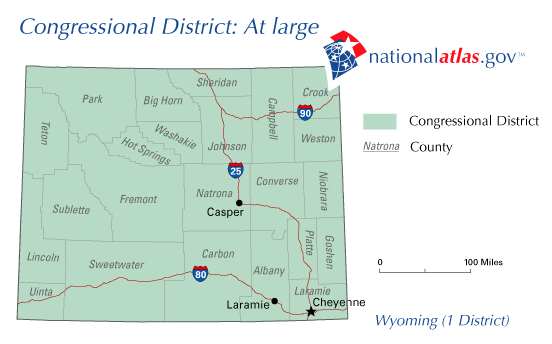
- Representative: Harriet Hageman; R–Cheyenne
- Area: 97,100 mi^{2} (251,000 km^{2})
- Distribution: 64.72% urban; 35.28% rural
- Population (2025): 588,753
- Median household income: $80,894
- Ethnicity: 81.4% White; 10.2% Hispanic; 4.1% Two or more races; 2.0% Native American; 0.9% Asian; 0.8% Black; 0.5% other
- Cook PVI: R+23

Wyoming's at-large congressional district is the sole congressional district for the US state of Wyoming. It is the third largest congressional district in the United States in terms of land size. The district is currently represented by Harriet Hageman.

== History ==
The district was first created when Wyoming achieved statehood on July 10, 1890, and having existed uninterrupted ever since, electing a single member. Since its creation, Wyoming has retained a single congressional district.

=== Voter registration ===
Chart of voter registration
1. Republican (80.8%)
2. Democratic (11.1%)
3. Unaffiliated (7.40%)
4. Libertarian (0.49%)
5. Constitution (0.16%)
6. No Labels (0.05%)
7. Other parties (0.01%)

Party enrollment as of August 1, 2024
Party	Total voters	Percentage
Republican	180,815	80.83%
Democratic	24,751	11.06%
Unaffiliated	16,563	7.40%
Libertarian	1,090	0.49%
Constitution	360	0.16%
No Labels	112	0.05%
Other parties	12	0.01%
Total	223,703	100%

== Recent statewide results ==
Year	Office	Results
2000	President	George W. Bush 68% - Al Gore 28%
2004	President	George W. Bush 69% - John Kerry 29%
2008	President	John McCain 65% - Barack Obama 33%
2012	President	Mitt Romney 69% - Barack Obama 28%
2016	President	Donald Trump 68% - Hillary Clinton 22%
2020	President	Donald Trump 70% - Joe Biden 27%
2024	President	Donald Trump 72% - Kamala Harris 26%

== List of members representing the district ==
Member	Party	Years of service	Cong ress	Electoral history
District established December 1, 1890
Clarence D. Clark (Evanston)	Republican	December 1, 1890 – March 3, 1893	51st 52nd	Elected, in the same single ballot, to the current term and the next term in 1890. Lost re-election.
Henry A. Coffeen (Big Horn)	Democratic	March 4, 1893 – March 3, 1895		Elected in 1892. Lost re-election.
Frank Wheeler Mondell (Newcastle)	Republican	March 4, 1895 – March 3, 1897		Elected in 1894. Lost re-election.
John Eugene Osborne (Rawlins)	Democratic	March 4, 1897 – March 3, 1899		Elected in 1896. Retired.
Frank Wheeler Mondell (Newcastle)	Republican	March 4, 1899 – March 3, 1923	56th 57th 58th 59th 60th 61st 62nd 63rd 64th 65th 66th 67th	Re-elected in 1898. Re-elected in 1900. Re-elected in 1902. Re-elected in 1904. Re-elected in 1906. Re-elected in 1908. Re-elected in 1910. Re-elected in 1912. Re-elected in 1914. Re-elected in 1916. Re-elected in 1918. Re-elected in 1920. Retired to run for U.S. Senator.
Charles E. Winter (Casper)	Republican	March 4, 1923 – March 3, 1929	68th 69th 70th	Elected in 1922. Re-elected in 1924. Re-elected in 1926. Retired to run for U.S. Senator.
Vincent Carter (Kemmerer)	Republican	March 4, 1929 – January 3, 1935	71st 72nd 73rd	Elected in 1928. Re-elected in 1930. Re-elected in 1932. Retired to run for U.S. Senator.
Paul Ranous Greever (Cody)	Democratic	January 3, 1935 – January 3, 1939	74th 75th	Elected in 1934. Re-elected in 1936. Lost re-election.
Frank O. Horton (Saddlestring)	Republican	January 3, 1939 – January 3, 1941		Elected in 1938. Lost re-election.
John J. McIntyre (Douglas)	Democratic	January 3, 1941 – January 3, 1943		Elected in 1940. Lost re-election.
Frank A. Barrett (Lusk)	Republican	January 3, 1943 – December 31, 1950	78th 79th 80th 81st	Elected in 1942. Re-elected in 1944. Re-elected in 1946. Re-elected in 1948. Retired to run for Governor of Wyoming. Resigned early to become Governor.
Vacant		December 31, 1950 – January 3, 1951		
William Henry Harrison III (Sheridan)	Republican	January 3, 1951 – January 3, 1955	82nd 83rd	Elected in 1950. Re-elected in 1952. Retired to run for U.S. Senator.
Keith Thomson (Cheyenne)	Republican	January 3, 1955 – December 9, 1960	84th 85th 86th	Elected in 1954. Re-elected in 1956. Re-elected in 1958. Retired to run for U.S. Senator. Died.
Vacant		December 9, 1960 – January 3, 1961		
William Henry Harrison III (Sheridan)	Republican	January 3, 1961 – January 3, 1965	87th 88th	Re-elected in 1960. Re-elected in 1962. Lost re-election.
Teno Roncalio (Cheyenne)	Democratic	January 3, 1965 – January 3, 1967		Elected in 1964. Retired to run for U.S. Senator.
William Henry Harrison III (Sheridan)	Republican	January 3, 1967 – January 3, 1969		Re-elected in 1966. Lost renomination.
John S. Wold (Casper)	Republican	January 3, 1969 – January 3, 1971		Elected in 1968. Retired to run for U.S. Senator.
Teno Roncalio (Cheyenne)	Democratic	January 3, 1971 – December 30, 1978	92nd 93rd 94th 95th	Re-elected in 1970. Re-elected in 1972. Re-elected in 1974. Re-elected in 1976. Retired and resigned early.
Vacant		December 30, 1978 – January 3, 1979		
Dick Cheney (Casper)	Republican	January 3, 1979 – March 20, 1989	96th 97th 98th 99th 100th 101st	Elected in 1978. Re-elected in 1980. Re-elected in 1982. Re-elected in 1984. Re-elected in 1986. Re-elected in 1988. Resigned to become U.S. Secretary of Defense.
Vacant		March 20, 1989 – April 26, 1989		
Craig L. Thomas (Casper)	Republican	April 26, 1989 – January 3, 1995	101st 102nd 103rd	Elected to finish Cheney's term. Re-elected in 1990. Re-elected in 1992. Retired to run for U.S. Senator.
Barbara Cubin (Casper)	Republican	January 3, 1995 – January 3, 2009	104th 105th 106th 107th 108th 109th 110th	Elected in 1994. Re-elected in 1996. Re-elected in 1998. Re-elected in 2000. Re-elected in 2002. Re-elected in 2004. Re-elected in 2006. Retired.
Cynthia Lummis (Cheyenne)	Republican	January 3, 2009 – January 3, 2017	111th 112th 113th 114th	Elected in 2008. Re-elected in 2010. Re-elected in 2012. Re-elected in 2014. Retired.
Liz Cheney (Wilson)	Republican	January 3, 2017 – January 3, 2023	115th 116th 117th	Elected in 2016. Re-elected in 2018. Re-elected in 2020. Lost renomination.
Harriet Hageman (Cheyenne)	Republican	January 3, 2023 – present	118th 119th	Elected in 2022. Re-elected in 2024. Retired to run for U.S. Senate.
Chuck Gray	Republican	Assuming office on January 3, 2027	120th	Elected in 2026.

== Electoral history ==
=== 2000 ===
Wyoming’s at-large congressional district election – 2000
Party	Candidate	Votes	%
Republican	Barbara Cubin (incumbent)	141,848	66.81
Democratic	Michael Allen Green	60,638	28.56
Libertarian	Lewis Stock	6,411	3.02
Natural Law	Victor Raymond	3,415	1.61

=== 2002 ===
Wyoming’s at-large congressional district election – 2002
Party	Candidate	Votes	%
Republican	Barbara Cubin (incumbent)	110,229	60.52
Democratic	Ron Akin	65,961	36.21
Libertarian	Lewis Stock	5,962	3.27

=== 2004 ===
Wyoming’s at-large congressional district election – 2004
Party	Candidate	Votes	%
Republican	Barbara Cubin (incumbent)	131,682	55.28
Democratic	Ted Ladd	99,982	41.97
Libertarian	Lewis Stock	6,553	2.75

=== 2006 ===
Wyoming’s at-large congressional district election – 2006
Party	Candidate	Votes	%
Republican	Barbara Cubin (incumbent)	93,336	48.33
Democratic	Gary Trauner	92,324	47.80
Libertarian	Thom Rankin	7,481	3.87

=== 2008 ===
Wyoming’s at-large congressional district election – 2008
Party	Candidate	Votes	%
Republican	Cynthia Lummis	131,244	52.63
Democratic	Gary Trauner	106,758	42.81
Libertarian	W. David Herbert	11,030	4.42
Write-In	Others	363	0.15

=== 2010 ===
Wyoming’s at-large congressional district election – 2010
Party	Candidate	Votes	%
Republican	Cynthia Lummis (incumbent)	131,661	70.42
Democratic	Dave Wendt	45,768	24.48
Libertarian	John V. Lowe	9,253	4.95
Write-In	Others	287	0.15

=== 2012 ===
Wyoming’s at-large congressional district election – 2012
Party	Candidate	Votes	%
Republican	Cynthia Lummis (incumbent)	166,452	68.89
Democratic	Chris Henrichsen	57,573	23.83
Libertarian	Richard P. Brubaker	8,442	3.49
Constitution	Daniel Clyde Cummings	4,963	2.05
Independent	Don Wills	3,775	1.56
Write-In	Others	416	0.17

=== 2014 ===
Wyoming’s at-large congressional district election – 2014
Party	Candidate	Votes	%
Republican	Cynthia Lummis (incumbent)	113,038	68.47
Democratic	Richard Grayson	37,803	22.90
Libertarian	Richard P. Brubaker	7,112	4.31
Constitution	Daniel Clyde Cummings	6,749	4.09
Write-In	Others	398	0.24

=== 2016 ===
Wyoming’s at-large congressional district election – 2016
Party	Candidate	Votes	%
Republican	Liz Cheney	156,176	62.03
Democratic	Ryan Greene	75,466	29.97
Constitution	Daniel Clyde Cummings	10,362	4.12
Libertarian	Lawrence Struempf	9,033	3.59
Write-In	Others	739	0.29

=== 2018 ===
Wyoming’s at-large congressional district election – 2018
Party	Candidate	Votes	%	±%
Republican	Liz Cheney (incumbent)	127,963	63.59%	+3.24%
Democratic	Greg Hunter	59,903	29.77%	+0.61%
Libertarian	Richard Brubaker	6,918	3.44%	−0.05%
Constitution	Daniel Clyde Cummings	6,070	3.01%	−0.99%
N/A	Write-Ins	391	0.19%	N/A
Margin of victory		68,060	33.82%	+2.63%
Total votes		201,245	100.0%	N/A
Republican hold				

=== 2020 ===
Wyoming’s at-large congressional district election – 2020
Party	Candidate	Votes	%	±%
Republican	Liz Cheney (incumbent)	185,732	68.56%	+4.98%
Democratic	Lynnette Grey Bull	66,576	24.58%	−5.19%
Libertarian	Richard Brubaker	10,154	3.75%	+0.31%
Constitution	Jeff Haggit	7,905	2.92%	−0.10%
Write-in		525	0.19%	±0.00%
Total votes		270,892	100.0%	N/A
Republican hold				

=== 2022 ===
Wyoming’s at-large congressional district election – 2022
Party	Candidate	Votes	%	±%
Republican	Harriet Hageman	132,206	68.19%	−0.37%
Democratic	Lynnette Grey Bull	47,250	24.36%	−0.22%
Libertarian	Richard Brubaker	5,420	2.80%	−0.95%
Constitution	Marissa Selvig	4,505	2.32%	−0.60%
Write-in		4,521	2.33%	+1.14%
Total votes		193,902	100.0%	N/A
Republican hold				

=== 2024 ===
2024 Wyoming's at-large congressional district election
Party	Candidate	Votes	%	±%
Republican	Harriet Hageman (incumbent)	184,680	70.61%	+2.43
Democratic	Kyle Cameron	60,778	23.24%	−1.13
Libertarian	Richard Brubaker	9,223	3.53%	+0.73
Constitution	Jeffrey Haggit	5,362	2.05%	−0.27
Write-in		1,505	0.58%	-1.75
Total votes		261,548	100.00%	N/A
Republican hold				

== See also ==
- List of United States congressional districts

== Sources ==
- Martis, Kenneth C. (1989). The Historical Atlas of Political Parties in the United States Congress. New York: Macmillan Publishing Company.
- Martis, Kenneth C. (1982). The Historical Atlas of United States Congressional Districts. New York: Macmillan Publishing Company.
- Congressional Biographical Directory of the United States 1774–present
