= 1964 United States House of Representatives election in Wyoming =

- November 3, 1964
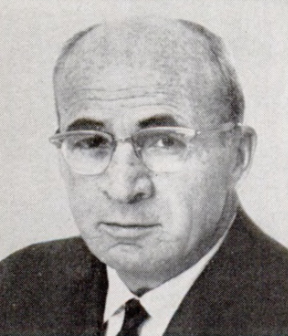

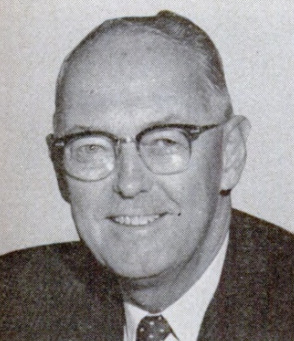
Nominee	Teno Roncalio	William Henry Harrison III
Party	Democratic	Republican
Popular vote	70,693	68,482
Percentage	50.79%	49.21%
- County results Roncalio: 50–60% 60–70% 70–80% Harrison: 50–60% 60–70% 70–80%
Representative At-large before election
William Henry Harrison
Republican
Elected Representative At-large
Teno Roncalio
Democratic

The 1964 United States House of Representatives election in Wyoming was held on November 3, 1964. Incumbent Republican Congressman William Henry Harrison ran for re-election. He was challenged in the general election by Democratic nominee Teno Roncalio, an attorney and former member of the International Joint Commission. Aided by President Lyndon B. Johnson's landslide victory in the presidential election, Roncalio narrowly defeated Harrison, becoming the first Democrat to win a U.S. House election in Wyoming since 1940.

== Democratic primary ==
=== Candidates ===
- Teno Roncalio, former Chairman of the Wyoming Democratic Party, former member of the International Joint Commission
- Hepburn T. Armstrong, uranium developer, 1960 Democratic nominee for U.S. House
- Stephen M. Moyle, former Mayor of Laramie, 1958 and 1962 Democratic candidate for the U.S. House
- George W. K. Posvar, perennial candidate

=== Campaign ===
In early 1964, Congressman William Henry Harrison announced that he would seek re-election rather than run for the Senate, kicking off the race for Congress. Walter Phelan, the Chairman of the Wyoming Democratic Party, named eight possible candidates: State Representative Edgar Herschler; U.S. Postal Service official William Hill; State Senator Ed Kendig; Natrona County Attorney Harry Leimback; Cheyenne Mayor Bill Nation; Teno Roncalio, a member of the International Joint Commission; John Terril, the U.S. Marshal for the District of Wyoming and the former Carbon County Sheriff; and Ray Whitaker, the former Natrona County Attorney. Roncalio announced his campaign later in the year, and received the state party's endorsement at its convention. While Roncalio was originally thought to be the main Democratic candidate in the primary, at the end of candidate filing, uranium developer Hepburn T. Armstrong and former Laramie Mayor Stephen Moyle, both of whom had run for Congress previously, filed to run. Ultimately, Roncalio defeated both in a landslide, winning 70 percent of the vote.

=== Results ===
Democratic primary results
Party	Candidate	Votes	%
Democratic	Teno Roncalio	29,860	70.26%
Democratic	Hepburn T. Armstrong	9,371	22.05%
Democratic	Stephen W. Moyle	2,080	4.89%
Democratic	George W. K. Posvar	1,188	2.80%
Total votes		42,499	100.00%

== Republican primary ==
=== Candidates ===
- William Henry Harrison, incumbent U.S. Representative

=== Results ===
Republican primary results
Party	Candidate	Votes	%
Republican	William Henry Harrison (inc.)	41,821	100.00%
Total votes		41,821	100.00%

== General election ==
=== Results ===
1964 Wyoming's at-large congressional district general election results
Party	Candidate	Votes	%
Democratic	Teno Roncalio	70,693	50.79%
Republican	William Henry Harrison (inc.)	68,482	49.21%
Total votes		139,175	100.00%
Democratic gain from Republican			
