= 1960 United States presidential election in Wyoming =

- November 8, 1960

Nominee	Richard Nixon	John F. Kennedy
Party	Republican	Democratic
Home state	California	Massachusetts
Running mate	Henry Cabot Lodge Jr.	Lyndon B. Johnson
Electoral vote	3	0
Popular vote	77,451	63,331
Percentage	55.01%	44.99%
County results
Nixon
50–60%
60–70%
70–80%
Kennedy
50–60%
60–70%
President before election
Dwight D. Eisenhower
Republican
Elected President
John F. Kennedy
Democratic

The 1960 United States presidential election in Wyoming took place on November 8, 1960, as part of the 1960 United States presidential election. State voters chose three representatives, or electors, to the Electoral College, who voted for president and vice president.

Wyoming was won by the incumbent Vice President, Republican Party (United States) Richard Nixon, running with former United Nations Ambassador Henry Cabot Lodge Jr., with 55.01 percent of the popular vote, against the Democratic nominee, Massachusetts Senator John F. Kennedy, running with Texas Senator Lyndon B. Johnson, with 44.99% of the popular vote, a 10% margin of victory. Nixon's victory was significantly smaller than Dwight Eisenhower's 20.2% margin of victory in 1956.

With Nixon's victory in the state, Republicans would see a full sweep of statewide offices that were on the ballot, including the sole House of Representatives election and the Class II Senate seat.

== Campaign ==
At the Democratic National Convention the Wyoming delegation had the ceremonial role of giving Kennedy the minimum amount needed to win the Democratic presidential nomination with Teno Roncalio casting the votes although Tracy S. McCraken, Wyoming's national committeeman, was incorrectly stated to have been the one to cast the votes by Time magazine. Governor John J. Hickey stated that the issue over Kennedy's Catholicism would not be important in Wyoming due to Hickey, who was also a Catholic, having won in 1958. During the campaign Nixon conducted a fifty-state strategy and visited every state at least once including Wyoming.

The Republican Party selected Harry B. Henderson, Mary Ellen Hinrichs, and James B. Griffith Sr. as their presidential electors.

=== Endorsements ===
Kennedy Endorsements
- John J. Hickey, 24th Governor of Wyoming
- Jack R. Gage, Secretary of State of Wyoming
- Velma Linford, 12th Wyoming Superintendent of Public Instruction
- Teno Roncalio, Chairman of the Wyoming Democratic Party

== Results ==
1960 United States presidential election in Wyoming
Party	Candidate	Votes	%
Republican	Richard M. Nixon	77,451	55.01%
Democratic	John F. Kennedy	63,331	44.99%
Total votes		140,782	100.00%

=== Results by county ===
County	Richard Nixon Republican		John F. Kennedy Democratic		Margin		Total votes cast
County	#	%	#	%	#	%	Total votes cast
Albany	4,356	50.43%	4,282	49.57%	74	0.86%	8,638
Big Horn	3,449	62.79%	2,044	37.21%	1,405	25.58%	5,493
Campbell	1,575	64.66%	861	35.34%	714	29.32%	2,436
Carbon	3,147	45.12%	3,828	54.88%	-681	-9.76%	6,975
Converse	1,933	67.61%	926	32.39%	1,007	35.22%	2,859
Crook	1,537	72.84%	573	27.16%	964	45.68%	2,110
Fremont	5,738	57.46%	4,248	42.54%	1,490	14.92%	9,986
Goshen	3,178	56.83%	2,414	43.17%	764	13.66%	5,592
Hot Springs	1,659	59.19%	1,144	40.81%	515	18.38%	2,803
Johnson	1,806	69.35%	798	30.65%	1,008	38.70%	2,604
Laramie	11,637	49.05%	12,086	50.95%	-449	-1.90%	23,723
Lincoln	2,010	50.78%	1,948	49.22%	62	1.56%	3,958
Natrona	11,809	56.74%	9,002	43.26%	2,807	13.48%	20,811
Niobrara	1,362	70.57%	568	29.43%	794	41.14%	1,930
Park	4,510	64.37%	2,496	35.63%	2,014	28.74%	7,006
Platte	1,771	53.20%	1,558	46.80%	213	6.40%	3,329
Sheridan	5,690	60.05%	3,786	39.95%	1,904	20.10%	9,476
Sublette	978	60.22%	646	39.78%	332	20.44%	1,624
Sweetwater	2,545	32.04%	5,398	67.96%	-2,853	-35.92%	7,943
Teton	1,158	66.51%	583	33.49%	575	33.02%	1,741
Uinta	1,606	50.09%	1,600	49.91%	6	0.18%	3,206
Washakie	2,254	62.70%	1,341	37.30%	913	25.40%	3,595
Weston	1,743	59.21%	1,201	40.79%	542	18.42%	2,944
Totals	77,451	55.01%	63,331	44.99%	14,120	10.02%	140,782

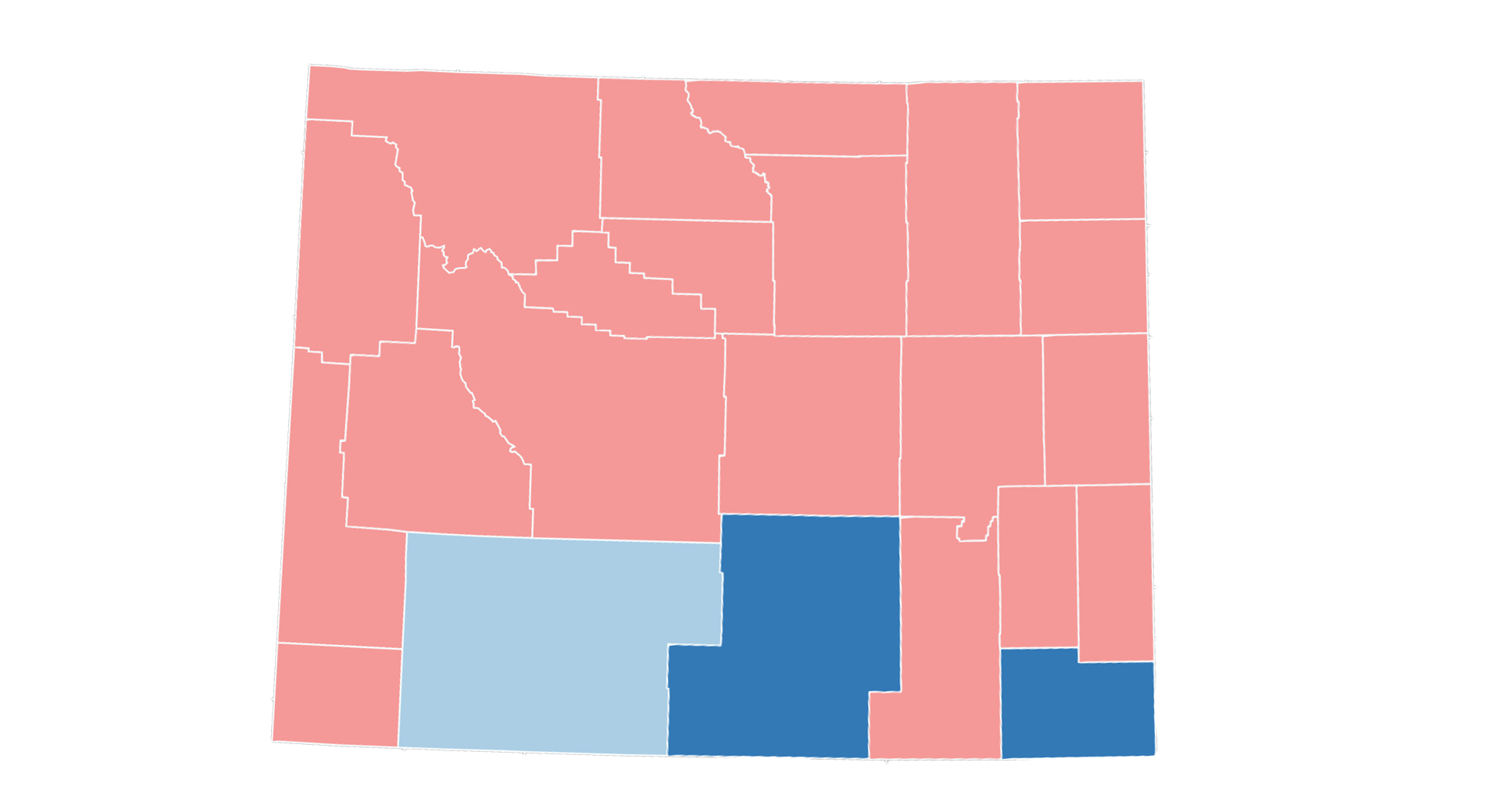
County flips from 1956: Democratic Hold Gain from Republican / Republican Hold

==== Counties that flipped from Republican to Democratic ====
- Carbon
- Laramie

== See also ==
- United States presidential elections in Wyoming
