= 1954 United States House of Representatives election in Wyoming =

- November 2, 1954
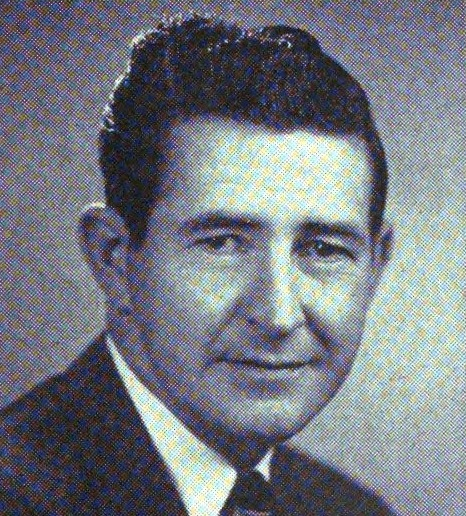
| Nominee | Keith Thomson | Sam Tully |
| Party | Republican | Democratic |
| Popular vote | 61,111 | 47,660 |
| Percentage | 56.18% | 43.82% |
U.S. Representative before election
William Henry Harrison
Republican
Elected U.S. Representative
Keith Thomson
Republican

The 1954 United States House of Representatives election in Wyoming was held on November 2, 1954. Incumbent Republican Congressman William Henry Harrison unsuccessfully ran for Senate instead of seeking re-election. State Representative Keith Thomson won the Republican primary and faced Rawlins Mayor Sam Tully, the Democratic nominee, in the general election. Though the Republican Party lost control of the U.S. House of Representatives in 1954, Thomson defeated Tully by a wide margin, winning 56 percent of the vote.

== Democratic primary ==
=== Candidates ===
- Sam Tully, Mayor of Rawlins
- Pat Flannery, 1948 Democratic nominee for Congress
- John F. Sullivan, Laramie attorney
- Alice de Mauriac Hammond, cattle farmer, 1952 Democratic candidate for Congress
- George W. K. Posvar, former artist's model

=== Results ===
Democratic primary results
| Party | Candidate | Votes | % |
|---|---|---|---|
| Democratic | Sam Tully | 11,678 | 36.50% |
| Democratic | Pat Flannery | 8,319 | 26.00% |
| Democratic | John F. Sullivan | 7,839 | 24.50% |
| Democratic | Alice de Mauriac Hammond | 3,490 | 10.91% |
| Democratic | George W. K. Posvar | 670 | 2.09% |
| Total votes | | 31,996 | 100.00% |

== Republican primary ==
=== Candidates ===
- Keith Thomson, State Representative
- Frank C. Emerson, former State Representative, son of Governor Frank Emerson
- Tom Nicholas, former Mayor of Casper
- Mark Cox, Cheyenne rancher

=== Results ===
Republican primary results
| Party | Candidate | Votes | % |
|---|---|---|---|
| Republican | Keith Thomson | 15,126 | 35.50% |
| Republican | Frank C. Emerson | 13,113 | 30.77% |
| Republican | Tom Nicholas | 8,008 | 18.79% |
| Republican | Mark Cox | 6,365 | 14.94% |
| Total votes | | 42,612 | 100.00% |

== General election ==
=== Results ===
1954 Wyoming's at-large congressional district general election results
| Party | Candidate | Votes | % |
|---|---|---|---|
| Republican | Keith Thomson | 61,111 | 56.18% |
| Democratic | Sam Tully | 47,660 | 43.82% |
| Total votes | | 108,771 | 100.00% |
| Republican hold | | | |
