= 1960 United States House of Representatives election in Wyoming =

- November 8, 1960
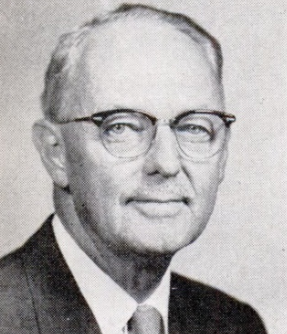

Nominee	William Henry Harrison	Hepburn T. Armstrong
Party	Republican	Democratic
Popular vote	70,241	64,090
Percentage	52.29%	47.71%
- County results Harrison: 50–60% 60–70% 70–80% Armstrong: 50–60% 60–70%
U.S. Representative before election
Keith Thomson
Republican
Elected U.S. Representative
William Henry Harrison
Republican

The 1960 United States House of Representatives election in Wyoming was held on November 8, 1960. Incumbent Republican Congressman Keith Thomson opted to successfully run for the U.S. Senate rather than seek re-election. Thomson won the election, but died a month after the election, and never took office. Former Congressman William Henry Harrison, who preceded Thomson in the House, won the Republican primary and faced Hepburn T. Armstrong, the Democratic nominee, in the general election.

== Democratic primary ==
=== Candidates ===
- Hepburn T. Armstrong, investment broker, 1958 Democratic candidate for the U.S. Senate
- Dudley D. Miles, Carbon County Attorney
- George W. K. Posvar, perennial candidate

=== Results ===
Democratic primary results
Party	Candidate	Votes	%
Democratic	Hepburn T. Armstrong	21,137	53.36%
Democratic	Dudley D. Miles	16,775	42.35%
Democratic	George W. K. Posvar	1,703	4.30%
Total votes		39,615	100.00%

== Republican primary ==
=== Candidates ===
- William Henry Harrison, former U.S. Representative, 1954 Republican nominee for the U.S. Senate
- Kenny Sailors, dude rancher, former University of Wyoming college basketball player
- Mark Cox, Cheyenne rancher, 1954 Republican candidate for Congress
- Walter Kingham, former Managing Director of the Wyoming Trucking Association, former State Representative
- Dick Greene, State Senator

=== Results ===
Republican primary results
Party	Candidate	Votes	%
Republican	William Henry Harrison	12,896	28.53%
Republican	Kenny Sailors	10,838	23.98%
Republican	Mark Cox	7,476	16.54%
Republican	Walter Kingham	7,272	16.09%
Republican	Dick Greene	6,718	14.86%
Total votes		45,200	100.00%

== General election ==
=== Results ===
1960 Wyoming's at-large congressional district general election results
Party	Candidate	Votes	%
Republican	William Henry Harrison	70,241	52.29%
Democratic	Hepburn T. Armstrong	64,090	47.71%
Total votes		134,331	100.00%
Republican hold			
