= 1952 United States House of Representatives election in Wyoming =

- November 4, 1952
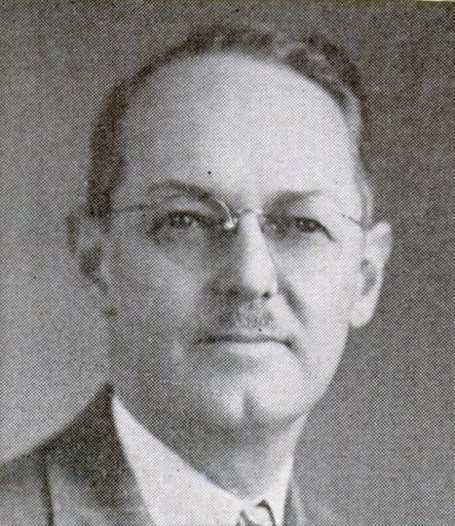
Nominee	William Henry Harrison	Robert R. Ross, Jr.
Party	Republican	Democratic
Popular vote	76,161	50,559
Percentage	60.10%	39.90%
U.S. Representative before election
William Henry Harrison
Republican
Elected U.S. Representative
William Henry Harrison
Republican

The 1952 United States House of Representatives election in Wyoming was held on November 4, 1952. Incumbent Republican Congressman William Henry Harrison ran for re-election to a second term. Former Cheyenne Mayor Robert R. Rose, Jr., an Assistant Secretary of the Interior, won the Democratic nomination and opposed Harrison in the general election. Harrison defeated Ross in a landslide, winning 60 percent of the vote.

== Democratic primary ==
=== Candidates ===
- Robert R. Rose, Jr., Assistant Secretary of the Interior, former Mayor of Casper
- Alice de Mauriac Hammond, cattle farmer
- Frank M. Thomas, State Senator
- Carl A. Johnson, Cheyenne accountant
- Sidney G. Kornegay, 1948 and 1950 Democratic candidate for Congress

=== Results ===
Democratic primary results
Party	Candidate	Votes	%
Democratic	Robert R. Rose, Jr.	15,190	56.35%
Democratic	Alice de Mauriac Hammond	4,582	17.00%
Democratic	Frank M. Thomas	3,753	13.92%
Democratic	Carl A. Johnson	2,824	10.48%
Democratic	Sidney G. Kornegay	609	2.26%
Total votes		26,958	100.00%

== Republican primary ==
=== Candidates ===
- William Henry Harrison, incumbente U.S. Representative

=== Results ===
Republican primary results
Party	Candidate	Votes	%
Republican	William Henry Harrison (inc.)	35,312	100.00%
Total votes		35,312	100.00%

== General election ==
=== Results ===
1952 Wyoming's at-large congressional district general election results
Party	Candidate	Votes	%
Republican	William Henry Harrison (inc.)	76,161	60.10%
Democratic	Robert R. Ross, Jr.	50,559	39.90%
Total votes		126,720	100.00%
Republican hold			
