= 1960 United States Senate election in Wyoming =

- November 8, 1960
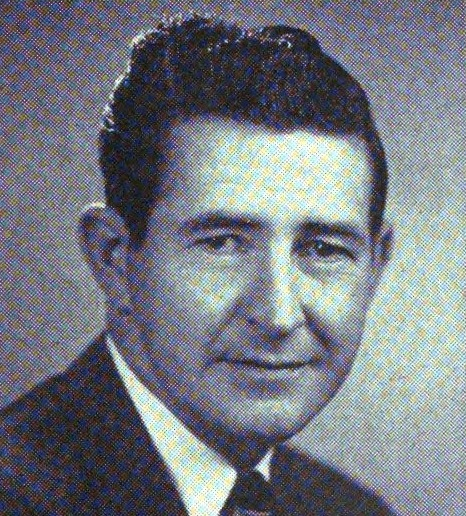

Nominee	Keith Thomson	Raymond B. Whitaker
Party	Republican	Democratic
Popular vote	78,103	60,447
Percentage	56.37%	43.63%
- County results Thomson: 50–60% 60–70% 70–80% Whitaker: 50–60% 60–70%
U.S. senator before election
Joseph C. O'Mahoney
Democratic
Elected U.S. Senator
Edwin Keith Thomson (died before taking office)
Republican

The 1960 United States Senate election in Wyoming was held on November 8, 1960. Incumbent Democratic Senator Joseph C. O'Mahoney was first appointed to the U.S. Senate from Wyoming's Class 1 Senate seat in 1934, and was re-elected in 1934, 1940, and 1946 before losing re-election in 1952. He was then elected to the Class 2 Senate seat in 1954. O'Mahoney, in failing health and increasingly limited in his mobility, declined to run for a fifth non-consecutive term in the Senate. The winner of this election, Keith Thomson, died before assuming his elected office.

Accordingly, a competitive race for the open seat ensued. Congressman Keith Thomson won the Republican primary over former U.S. Senator and former Governor Frank A. Barrett, while 1958 Democratic congressional nominee Raymond B. Whitaker, the former Natrona County Prosecuting Attorney, beat out State Superintendent Velma Linford to win the Democratic nomination, queueing up a rematch between Thomson and Whitaker. Despite Democrats' recent history of winning competitive Senate elections in Wyoming, however, Thomson defeated Whitaker by a wide margin, closely matching Richard M. Nixon's margin over John F. Kennedy in the presidential election. However, Thomson died of a heart attack on December 9, prior to his assuming office. Democratic Governor John J. Hickey appointed himself to fill the vacancy; Hickey would serve until his defeat in the 1962 special election.

A Republican gain turned into a Democratic retention of the seat following Thomson's death and Hickey's decision to have himself appointed.

== Democratic primary ==
=== Candidates ===
- Raymond B. Whitaker, former Natrona County Prosecuting Attorney, 1958 Democratic nominee for the U.S. House of Representatives
- Velma Linford, Wyoming Superintendent of Public Instruction
- Carl A. Johnson, perennial candidate
- Charles B. Chittim, former State Senator

=== Results ===
Democratic primary
Party	Candidate	Votes	%
Democratic	Raymond B. Whitaker	18,031	40.21%
Democratic	Velma Linford	13,792	30.75%
Democratic	Carl A. Johnson	5,370	11.97%
Democratic	Charles B. Chittim	3,653	8.15%
Total votes		40,846	100.00%

== Republican primary ==
=== Candidates ===
- Keith Thomson, U.S. Congressman from Wyoming's at-large congressional district
- Frank A. Barrett, former U.S. Senator, former Governor of Wyoming
- Miff M. Butler, mining engineer

=== Results ===
Republican primary
Party	Candidate	Votes	%
Republican	Keith Thomson	31,596	69.08%
Republican	Frank A. Barrett	13,380	29.25%
Republican	Miff M. Butler	765	1.67%
Total votes		45,741	100.00%

== General election ==
=== Results ===
1960 United States Senate election in Wyoming
Party	Candidate	Votes	%	±%
Republican	Keith Thomson	78,103	56.37%	+7.90%
Democratic	Raymond B. Whitaker	60,447	43.63%	−7.90%
Majority		17,656	12.74%	+9.68%
Turnout		138,550		
Republican gain from Democratic				

Senator-elect Thomson died on December 9, 1960, and with the appointment of Governor John Hickey at the beginning of what should have been Thomson's term, the Democrats retained this seat until a special election was held in 1962.
