= Platform canvas =

Conceptual framework for understanding organizations

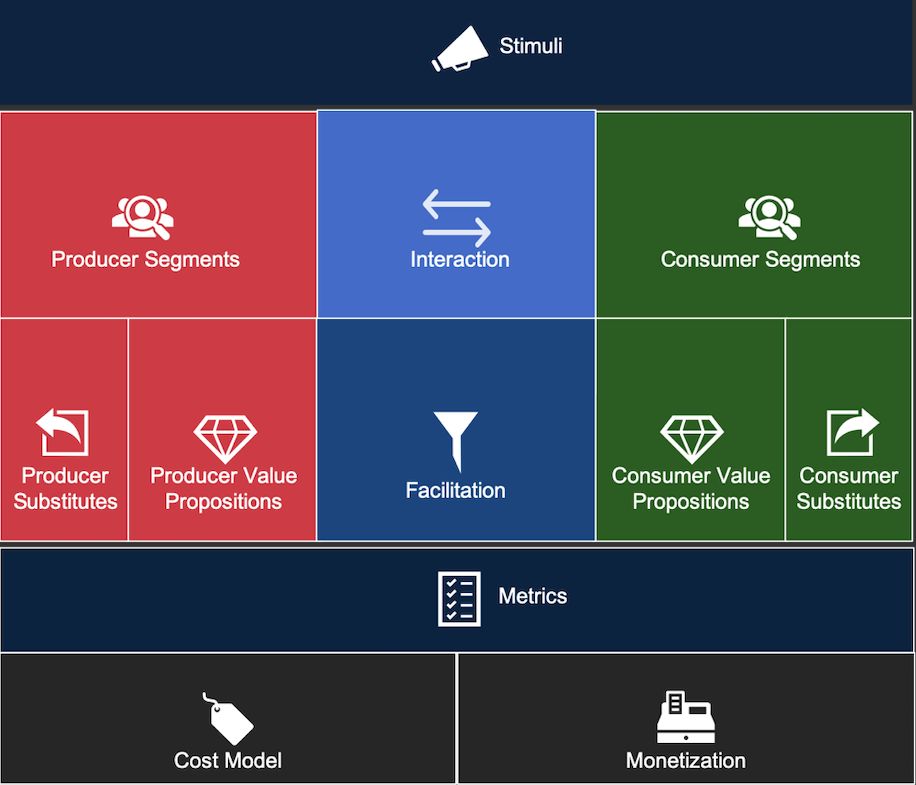

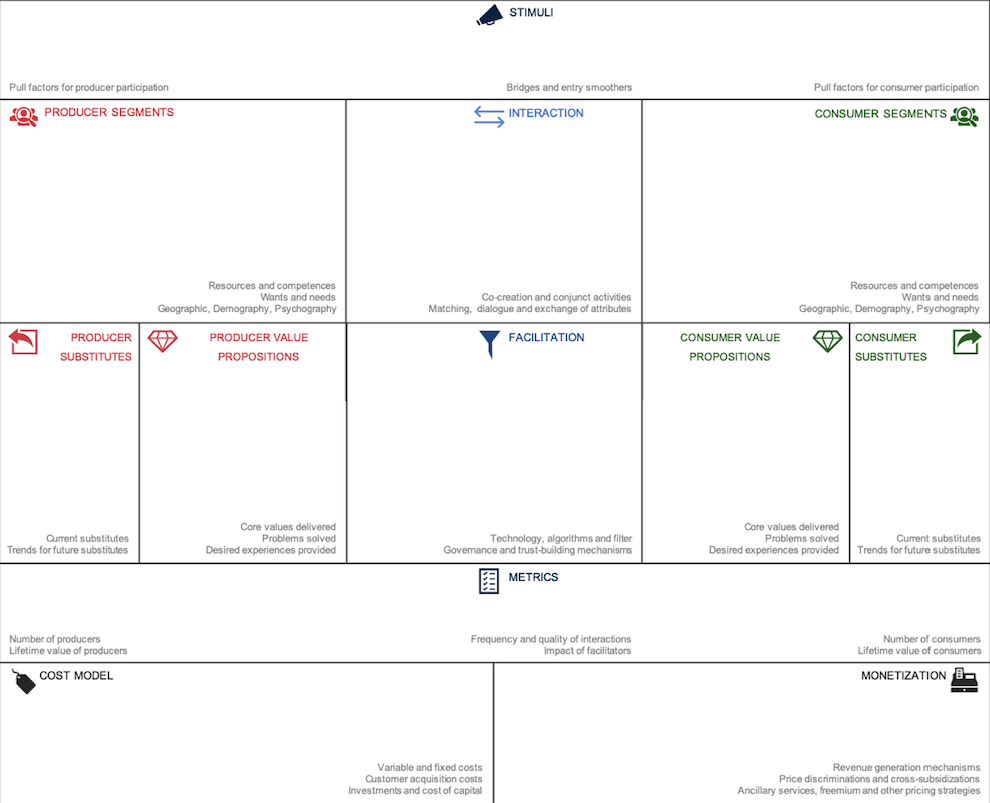
Work-in version of the Platform Canvas

The Platform Canvas is a conceptual framework designed to explain the mechanisms of multi-sided platform organizations, and how they create, capture, and deliver value in the platform economy. Multi-sided platforms, also called two-sided markets, like Amazon, Uber and Airbnb, create value primarily by facilitating direct interactions between distinct groups of affiliated customers. The framework serves as a strategic management tool for academics, entrepreneurs and managers helping them identify the essential elements in platform businesses, understand the interrelations among these element, and analyze the dynamics of associated network effects. The 12 components of the canvas highlight both internal and external factors of the business model and the orchestration of affiliated ecosystems.

The Platform Canvas is derived from the traditional Business Model Canvas first published in Business Model Generation: A Handbook For Visionaries, Game Changers, and Challengers by Osterwalder and Pigneur in 2010. The Business Model Canvas is widely acknowledged around the world by practitioners and academics. It represents the structure and components of a traditional linear business model, where value is produced upstream and consumed downstream, in a linear flow. The Platform Canvas, on the other hand, represents the structure, components and connections within multi-sided platform models, where value is created in the interaction among marketplace participants.

== Description ==
The Platform Canvas has 12 components; each element is named in the list below.

- Consumer Segments
- Producer Segments
- Consumer Value Propositions
- Producer Value Propositions
- Interaction
- Facilitation
- Consumer Substitutes
- Producers Substitutes
- Stimuli
- Monetarization
- Cost Model
- Metrics

== History ==
The framework of the Platform Canvas was first designed by Marcel Allweins in 2019, inspired by the earlier work of Dr. Ted Ladd on platform entrepreneurship. The final version of the canvas and its ideology was introduced in a conceptual paper, co-authored by Marcel Allweins, Markus Proesch and Ted Ladd and was first presented in January 2020 at the United States Association for Small Business and Entrepreneurship conference in New Orleans, Louisiana where it was awarded ‘Best Conceptual Paper’. The framework is published as a conceptual design and a work-in-template available in web-based formats via the official website.
