= 1956 United States House of Representatives election in Wyoming =

- November 6, 1956
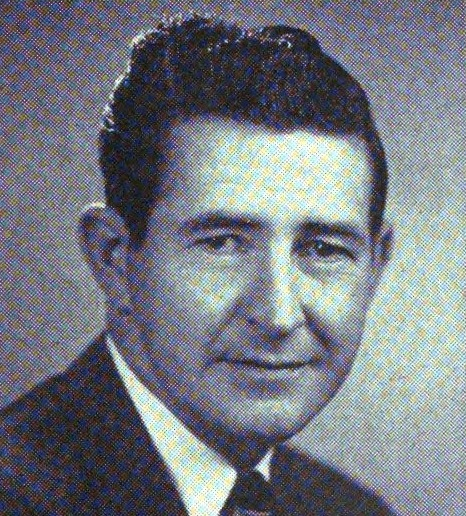
Nominee	Keith Thomson	Jerry A. O'Callaghan
Party	Republican	Democratic
Popular vote	69,903	50,225
Percentage	58.19%	41.18%
U.S. Representative before election
Keith Thomson
Republican
Elected U.S. Representative
Keith Thomson
Republican

The 1956 United States House of Representatives election in Wyoming was held on November 6, 1956. Incumbent Republican Congressman Keith Thomson ran for re-election to a second term. He won the Republican primary unopposed and faced Democratic nominee Jerry A. O'Callaghan, a history instructor at the University of Wyoming and former journalist, in the general election. Thomson defeated O'Callaghan with 58 percent of the vote, slightly underperforming President Dwight D. Eisenhower's landslide victory in the state.

== Democratic primary ==
=== Candidates ===
- Jerry A. O'Callaghan, history instructor at the University of Wyoming, former oil editor of the Casper Tribune-Herald
- A. M. Downey, former State Representative
- Dora Belle Harris, rancher
- George W. K. Posvar, 1954 Democratic candidate for Congress

=== Results ===
Democratic primary results
Party	Candidate	Votes	%
Democratic	Jerry A. O'Callaghan	12,315	43.37%
Democratic	A. M. Downey	8,581	30.22%
Democratic	Dora Belle Harris	5,413	19.06%
Democratic	George W. K. Posvar	2,086	7.35%
Total votes		28,395	100.00%

== Republican primary ==
=== Candidates ===
- Keith Thomson, incumbent U.S. Representative

=== Results ===
Republican primary results
Party	Candidate	Votes	%
Republican	Keith Thomson (inc.)	34,321	100.00%
Total votes		34,321	100.00%

== General election ==
=== Results ===
1956 Wyoming's at-large congressional district general election results
Party	Candidate	Votes	%
Republican	Keith Thomson (inc.)	69,903	58.19%
Democratic	Jerry A. O'Callaghan	50,225	41.81%
Total votes		120,128	100.00%
Republican hold			
