= 1950 United States House of Representatives election in Wyoming =

- November 7, 1950
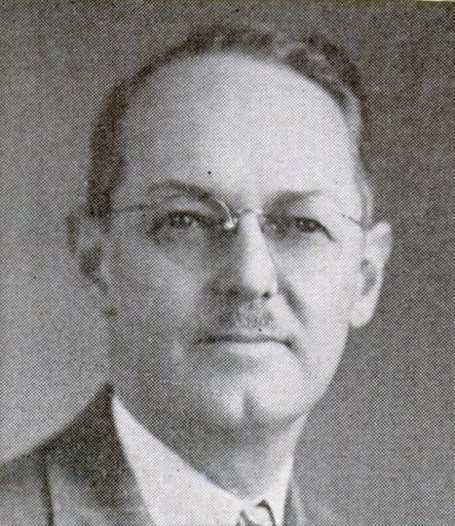
Nominee	William Henry Harrison	John B. Clark
Party	Republican	Democratic
Popular vote	50,865	42,483
Percentage	54.49%	45.51%
U.S. Representative before election
Frank A. Barrett
Republican
Elected U.S. Representative
William Henry Harrison
Republican

The 1950 United States House of Representatives election in Wyoming was held on November 7, 1950. Incumbent Republican Congressman Frank A. Barrett opted to successfully run for Governor rather than seek re-election. State Representative William Henry Harrison, the grandson of President Benjamin Harrison, won the Republican nomination, and faced John B. Clark, the Chairman of the Wyoming Democratic Party, in the general election. Harrison ultimately defeated Carl with 54 percent of the vote.

== Democratic primary ==
=== Candidates ===
- John B. Clark, Chairman of the Wyoming Democratic Party
- Ragnor "Rug" Barhaugh, Casper dog food manufacturer
- Sidney G. Kornegay, 1948 Democratic candidate for Congress

=== Results ===
Democratic primary results
Party	Candidate	Votes	%
Democratic	John B. Clark	18,148	69.15%
Democratic	Ragnor "Rug" Barhaugh	5,300	20.20%
Democratic	Sidney G. Kornegay	2,796	10.65%
Total votes		26,244	100.00%

== Republican primary ==
=== Candidates ===
- William Henry Harrison, State Representative
- Homer Oxley, former Speaker of the Wyoming House of Representatives
- T. C. Thompson, Deputy Secretary of State of Wyoming

=== Results ===
Republican primary results
Party	Candidate	Votes	%
Republican	William Henry Harrison	14,859	42.99%
Republican	Homer Oxley	11,438	33.10%
Republican	T. C. Thompson	8,262	23.91%
Republican	Write-ins	1	0.00%
Total votes		34,560	100.00%

== General election ==
=== Results ===
1950 Wyoming's at-large congressional district general election results
Party	Candidate	Votes	%
Republican	William Henry Harrison	50,865	54.49%
Democratic	John B. Clark	42,483	45.51%
Total votes		93,348	100.00%
Republican hold			
