= Teno Roncalio =

American politician (1916–2003)

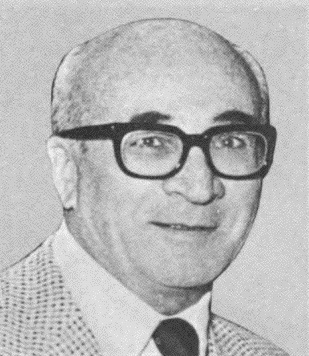

Member of the U.S. House of Representatives from Wyoming's at-large district
- In office January 3, 1965 – January 3, 1967
- Preceded by: William Henry Harrison III
- Succeeded by: William Henry Harrison III
- In office January 3, 1971 – December 30, 1978
- Preceded by: John S. Wold
- Succeeded by: Dick Cheney

Personal details
- Born: Celeste Domenico Roncaglio; March 23, 1916 Rock Springs, Wyoming, U.S.
- Died: March 30, 2003 (aged 87) Cheyenne, Wyoming, U.S.
- Party: Democratic
- Spouse: Cecilia Waters Domenico
- Children: 6
- Parents: Frank Roncalio (father); Ernesta Roncalio (mother)
- Education: University of Wyoming

Military service
- Allegiance: United States
- Branch/service: United States Army
- Years of service: 1942–1945
- Rank: Captain
- Unit: 18th Infantry Regiment
- Awards: Silver Star

Teno Domenico Roncalio (born Celeste Domenico Roncaglio; March 23, 1916 – March 30, 2003), was an American politician and writer who served in the United States House of Representatives. To date, he is the last Democrat to have represented Wyoming in Congress.

During the 1950s and 1960s, Roncalio served in multiple positions within the Wyoming Democratic Party. He was elected to the House of Representatives in 1964, and served until he unsuccessfully ran for the United States Senate in 1966. Roncalio was elected to the House of Representatives in 1970, and served until he announced that he would not seek reelection in 1978.

Roncalio held positions in environmental committees during John F. Kennedy's administration and in the 1980s. During his tenure in the House of Representatives, he supported multiple environmental bills and was a staunch opponent of American involvement in the Vietnam War. After leaving the House of Representatives he remained active in politics and helped some of the remaining successful campaigns of the Wyoming Democratic Party before his death.

== Early life ==
Celeste Domenico Roncaglio was born on March 23, 1916, in Rock Springs, Wyoming, to Frank and Ernesta Roncalio, Italians who had immigrated to the United States in 1903. His family later removed the G in their last name; he was known by the diminutive "Celestino", so was given the nickname "Tino" as a child, which later became Teno. In 1933, he earned his barber's license and after high school he worked as a reporter for the Rock Springs Rocket-Miner. He enlisted into the army following Pearl Harbor and during World War II he fought at the Battle of Gela and was later awarded a Silver Star for gallantry in the Normandy invasion on Omaha Beach. In 1945, he was discharged from the army with the rank of captain.

In 1940, he started editing the Wyoming Collegiate features which were published by the Casper Tribune-Herald newspaper. While in college, he was elected as president of the student body, joined the Young Democrats, and Senator Joseph C. O'Mahoney offered him a job in Washington, D.C. In 1947, he graduated from the University of Wyoming with a law degree.

== Career ==
=== Politics ===
In 1950, he began working as editor of the Wyoming Labor Journal. He served as the prosecuting attorney for Laramie County from 1950 to 1956. In 1957, he was elected as chairman of the Wyoming Democratic Party. Later that year, Governor Milward Simpson proposed a civil rights bill that Roncalio had drafted after seeing a black couple being removed from a restaurant. He also served as a delegate to the 1956, 1960, 1964, and 1968 Democratic National Conventions. In 1958, it was speculated that he could be appointed as Wyoming's next attorney general, but on December 3, 1958, he stated that he did not want to be appointed to the office.

As Chairman of the Wyoming delegation to the 1960 Convention, he cast the fifteen votes which gave John F. Kennedy the minimum amount needed to win the Democratic presidential nomination. Following Senator-elect Edwin Keith Thomson's death, Kennedy asked Governor John J. Hickey to appoint Roncalio to fill the Senate vacancy, but Hickey chose to instead appoint himself. Kennedy later appointed him as chairman of the International Joint Commission on Water Rights between the United States and Canada in 1961 and served until 1964.

=== House of Representatives ===
==== 1965–1967 ====
On April 28, 1964, he announced that he would run for the Democratic nomination for Wyoming's at-large congressional seat and in the general election he narrowly defeated incumbent Representative William Henry Harrison with the coattail effect of President Lyndon B. Johnson's victory in Wyoming during the presidential election helping him.

Upon taking office he praised President Johnson for his state of the union speech and called it the "20th century restatement of the constitutional principles on which this nation is founded". During the 89th session he served on the Interior and Veterans Affairs committees. On June 15, 1966, he formally announced that he would run for the U.S. Senate instead of seeking reelection, but was defeated in the general election by Governor Clifford P. Hansen.

==== Interlude ====
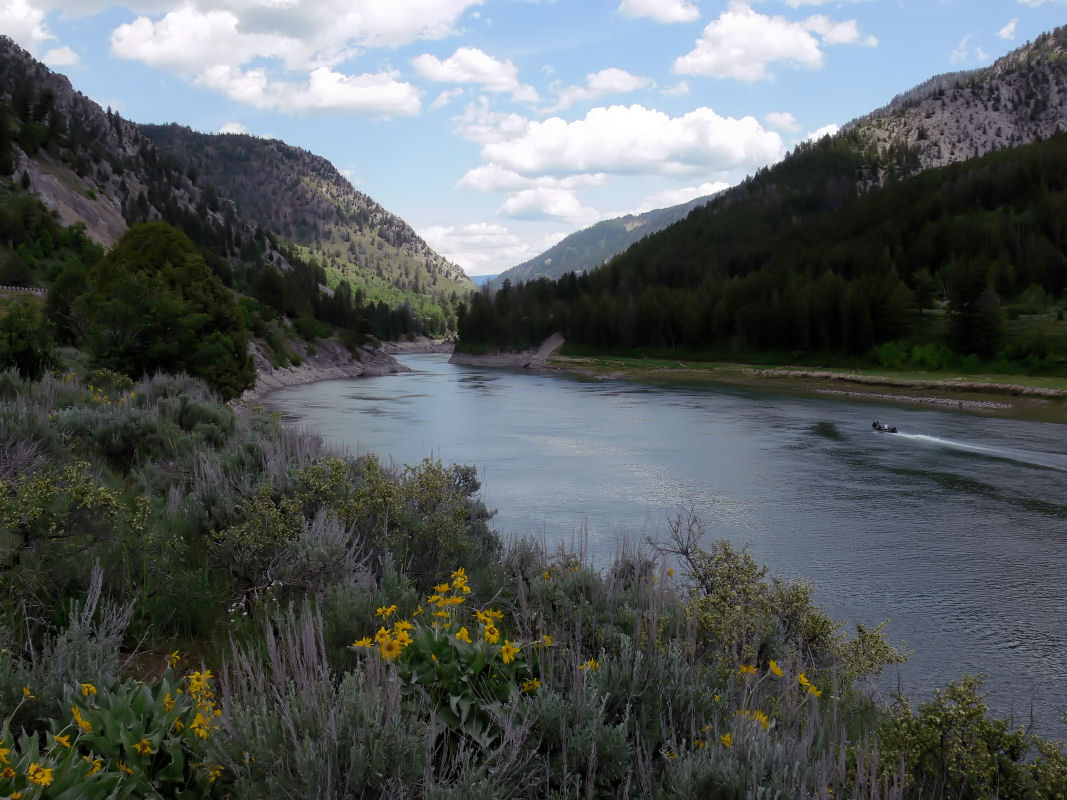
Snake River Canyon

After losing the Senate election Roncalio filed multiple affidavits for land claims around the Snake River and it was publicly revealed in 1972 that his land claims were estimated to hold $7 billion worth of gold.

In 1967, he was asked to run for the House again in the 1968 election, but chose not to. During the 1968 Democratic presidential primaries he supported Senator Robert F. Kennedy and was a member of his staff. When Roncalio heard about Robert Kennedy's assassination he stated that "I can't think of anything appropriate newsworthy or decent to say". After Kennedy's death he supported the anti-Humphrey movement at the national convention. In April 1969, William A. Norris Jr., Wyoming's Democratic national committeeman, announced that he would resign and on May 5, 1969, Roncalio was selected to replace him by acclamation after Joe Stewart, the only other candidate, withdrew two days before.

==== 1971–1978 ====
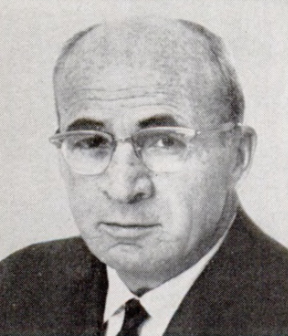
Teno Roncalio in 1965

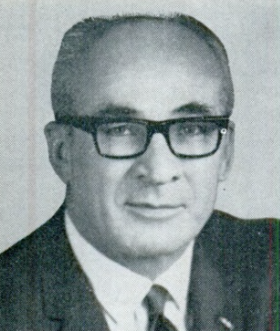
Teno Roncalio in 1971

In 1969, he stated that he would not run against incumbent Senator Gale W. McGee in the Democratic primary and stated that he would either run for governor or the House. On June 23, 1970, he announced that he would seek the Democratic nomination for Wyoming's at-large House seat. In the primary he easily defeated state representative and future governor Edgar Herschler and in the general election narrowly defeated state Superintendent of Public Instruction Harry Roberts by 608 votes.

Although he did not endorse him, Roncalio stated that Senator Edmund Muskie was the most balanced candidate during the 1972 Democratic presidential primaries, but later voted for George McGovern at the national convention in Miami Beach, Florida. Roncalio stated throughout 1971 that he would not run against Clifford P. Hansen for Senate again and on July 20, 1972, he filed to run for reelection and was reelected by a similar margin in the general election against Bill Kidd. On June 28, 1974, he announced that he would seek another term and defeated state senator Thomas F. Stroock by over 12,000 votes. In 1976, he won reelection against Larry J. Hart by almost 20,000 votes.

During the Watergate investigation he remained uncommitted until after the "smoking gun" tape was released and supported his impeachment. He stated that an impeachment trial should happen after a new vice president was confirmed after Spiro Agnew's resignation and in 1973 he voted in favor of House Minority Leader Gerald Ford's appointment as vice president. Following Nixon's resignation and Ford's accession to the presidency Roncalio voted in favor of Nelson Rockefeller's appointment as vice president.

On September 17, 1977, he announced that he would not run for reelection while at a University of Wyoming football game and stated that he would not run for governor giving his support to former state representative Edgar Herschler. In the 1978 election former White House Chief of Staff Dick Cheney easily won to succeed Roncalio and Roncalio resigned early on December 30, 1978.

== Later life ==
He returned to Wyoming, where he served as Special Master in Wyoming's Big Horn adjudication of Indian Water Rights until 1982. In 1980, he endorsed Jim Rogers' house campaign, but Rogers was defeated in a landslide by Dick Cheney. In 1982, he endorsed Rodger McDaniel's unsuccessful U.S. Senate campaign. In 1986, his wife served as co-chair of Kathy Karpan's successful Secretary of State campaign and in 1990, he donated $1,000 to Pete Maxfield's unsuccessful House campaign against Craig L. Thomas.

In 1980, Roncalio explored for gold around the Snake River in Teton County. In 2002, the post office in Rock Springs, Wyoming was named in his honor. On March 30, 2003, Roncalio died of congestive heart failure at the Life Care Center in Cheyenne, Wyoming and was buried in Mount Olivet Cemetery. Governor Dave Freudenthal, former Governor Mike Sullivan, Senator Craig L. Thomas, State Chief Justice William U. Hill, former Secretary of State Kathy Karpan, and other Wyoming political figures attended his funeral and a letter from Senator Ted Kennedy was read at the funeral.

== Political positions ==
=== Domestic ===
In 1965, he introduced legislation to extend the National Wool Act of 1954 through December 1972 in the House alongside Senator Gale McGee who introduced it in the Senate. In 1965, he introduced a bill that would have repealed Section 14B of the Taft–Hartley Act that prevents unions from negotiating contracts or legally binding documents requiring companies to fire workers who refuse to join the union, but it failed. In 1966, he proposed that every window on commercial airplanes should be turned into emergency exits and tried to get the Federal Aviation Administration to support his idea, but he was unsuccessful.

In July 1974, he voted for an amendment that would prevent the use of federal funds for abortions, but it was defeated on a vote of 123-247.

==== Amendments ====
In 1966, President Lyndon B. Johnson suggested during his state of the union address that Congress should pass a constitutional amendment giving members of the House of Representatives four-year terms instead of the current two years and Roncalio supported the idea, but the constitutional amendment was unsuccessful.

In 1966, he introduced a resolution calling for the support of a constitutional amendment to lower the voting age. Although the resolution did not lead to a constitutional amendment Roncalio would later support the 26th amendment when he returned to the House of Representatives in 1971.

==== Environmental ====
In 1965, he started efforts to have the Agate Fossil Beds established as a protected landscape. The fossil beds were authorized as a national monument by Congress in 1965, but would not be officially established until June 14, 1997. In 1972, he helped in the establishment of Fossil Butte National Monument as a protected landscape. In 1973, he successfully defeated efforts to use underground nuclear blasts to produce natural gas.

=== Foreign ===
In 1965, he supported a bill created by Representative Omar Burleson that would reduce the United States' importation of oil from 2,200,000 barrels by 375,000 barrels daily and increase domestic production of oil. In 1966, he supported an effort to remove funding for the House Un-American Activities Committee and created a resolution demanding that France pay back its $6 billion in war debts to the United States.

==== Vietnam War ====
On February 12, 1965, Roncalio stated that the United States should continue its intervention in Vietnam despite threats by China to intervene and on April 5, 1965, supported an appropriations bill for the funding of a new American Embassy in Saigon, South Vietnam to show that the United States would continue its involvement in the area.

However, when he returned to the House of Representatives in the 1970s he was staunchly against the Vietnam War. In 1969, he criticized Richard Nixon's Peace with Honor plan as a "phony promise" and that the United States had failed in Vietnam and should withdraw its soldiers. On November 10, 1971, he voted for a budget amendment that would have halted all defense spending by November 15 stating that he would not vote for any defense spending until a Vietnam withdrawal date was set, but it was defeated with three hundred fifty six against. In February 1971, he was one of ninety nine to vote against a two-year extension to the draft, but it was passed with two hundred ninety three in favor.

== Electoral history ==
Teno Roncalio electoral history

1964 Wyoming at-large congressional district Democratic primary
| Party | Candidate | Votes | % |
|---|---|---|---|
| Democratic | Teno Roncalio | 29,860 | 70.3% |
| Democratic | Hepburn T. Armstrong | 9,371 | 22.1% |
| Democratic | S. W. Moyle | 2,080 | 4.9% |
| Democratic | George W.K. Posvar | 1,188 | 2.8% |
| Total votes | | 42,499 | 100.0% |

1964 Wyoming at-large congressional district election
| Party | Candidate | Votes | % | ±% |
|---|---|---|---|---|
| Democratic | Teno Roncalio | 70,693 | 50.8% | +12.2% |
| Republican | William Henry Harrison III (incumbent) | 68,482 | 49.2% | −12.2% |
| Total votes | | 139,175 | 100.0% | |

1966 Wyoming United States Senate election
| Party | Candidate | Votes | % | ±% |
|---|---|---|---|---|
| Republican | Clifford Hansen | 63,548 | 51.8% | −6.0% |
| Democratic | Teno Roncalio | 59,141 | 48.2% | +6.0% |
| Total votes | | 122,689 | 100.0% | |

1970 Wyoming at-large congressional district Democratic primary
| Party | Candidate | Votes | % |
|---|---|---|---|
| Democratic | Teno Roncalio | 26,309 | 66.4% |
| Democratic | Edgar Herschler | 11,238 | 28.3% |
| Democratic | George W.K. Posvar | 2,102 | 5.3% |
| Total votes | | 39,649 | 100.0% |

1970 Wyoming at-large congressional district election
| Party | Candidate | Votes | % | ±% |
|---|---|---|---|---|
| Democratic | Teno Roncalio | 58,456 | 50.3% | +13.0% |
| Republican | Harry Roberts | 57,88 | 49.7% | −13.0% |
| Total votes | | 116,304 | 100.0% | |

1972 Wyoming at-large congressional district election
| Party | Candidate | Votes | % | ±% |
|---|---|---|---|---|
| Democratic | Teno Roncalio (incumbent) | 75,632 | 51.7% | +1.4% |
| Republican | Bill Kidd | 70,667 | 48.3% | −1.4% |
| Total votes | | 146,299 | 100.0% | |

1974 Wyoming at-large congressional district election
| Party | Candidate | Votes | % | ±% |
|---|---|---|---|---|
| Democratic | Teno Roncalio (incumbent) | 69,434 | 54.7% | +3.0% |
| Republican | Thomas F. Stroock | 57,499 | 45.3% | −3.0% |
| Total votes | | 126,933 | 100.0% | |

1976 Wyoming at-large congressional district Democratic primary
| Party | Candidate | Votes | % |
|---|---|---|---|
| Democratic | Teno Roncalio (incumbent) | 41,393 | 86.0% |
| Democratic | Al Hamburg | 6,751 | 14.0% |
| Total votes | | 48,144 | 100.0% |

1976 Wyoming at-large congressional district election
| Party | Candidate | Votes | % | ±% |
|---|---|---|---|---|
| Democratic | Teno Roncalio (incumbent) | 85,721 | 56.4% | +1.7% |
| Republican | Larry J. Hart | 66,147 | 43.6% | −1.7% |
| Total votes | | 151,868 | 100.0% | |

Party political offices
| Preceded by John J. Hickey | Democratic nominee for U.S. Senator from Wyoming (Class 2); 1966 | Succeeded by Mike Vinch |
U.S. House of Representatives
| Preceded by William Henry Harrison III (R) | Member of the U.S. House of Representatives from Wyoming's at-large congressional district January 3, 1965 – January 3, 1967 | Succeeded by William Henry Harrison III (R) |
| Preceded by John S. Wold (R) | Member of the U.S. House of Representatives from Wyoming's at-large congressional district January 3, 1971 – December 30, 1978 | Succeeded by Dick Cheney (R) |
