= 1966 United States Senate election in Wyoming =

- November 8, 1966
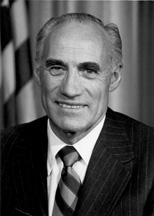

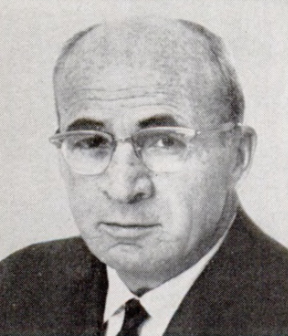
Nominee	Clifford Hansen	Teno Roncalio
Party	Republican	Democratic
Popular vote	63,548	59,141
Percentage	51.80%	48.20%
- County results Hansen: 50–60% 60–70% 70–80% Roncalio: 50–60% 70–80%
U.S. senator before election
Milward Simpson
Republican
Elected U.S. Senator
Clifford Hansen
Republican

The 1966 United States Senate election in Wyoming was held on November 8, 1966. First-term Republican Senator Milward Simpson, who was first elected in the 1962 special election, declined to seek re-election because of his declining health. Governor Clifford Hansen won the Republican primary and faced Democratic Congressman Teno Roncalio in the general election. Despite the strong performance by Republicans nationwide, and the strong Republican victory in the gubernatorial election, the race was quite close. Hansen ended up winning, defeating Roncalio with 52% of the vote.

== Democratic primary ==
=== Candidates ===
- Teno Roncalio, U.S. Congressman from Wyoming's at-large congressional district

=== Results ===
Democratic primary
Party	Candidate	Votes	%
Democratic	Teno Roncalio	39,130	100.00%
Total votes		39,130	100.00%

== Republican primary ==
=== Candidates ===
- Clifford Hansen, Governor of Wyoming
- Bud Kinney, perennial candidate

=== Results ===
Republican primary
Party	Candidate	Votes	%
Republican	Clifford Hansen	40,102	86.11%
Republican	Bud Kinney	6,468	13.89%
Total votes		46,570	100.00%

== General election ==
=== Results ===
1966 United States Senate election in Wyoming
Party	Candidate	Votes	%	±%
Republican	Clifford Hansen	63,548	51.80%	−6.04%
Democratic	Teno Roncalio	59,141	48.20%	+6.04%
Majority		4,407	3.59%	−12.09%
Turnout		122,689		
Republican hold				
