= 1962 United States House of Representatives election in Wyoming =

- November 6, 1962
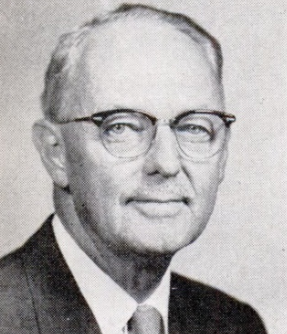

Nominee	William Henry Harrison	Louis A. Mankus
Party	Republican	Democratic
Popular vote	71,489	44,985
Percentage	61.38%	38.62%
- County results Harrison: 50–60% 60–70% 70–80% Mankus: 60–70%
U.S. Representative before election
William Henry Harrison
Republican
Elected U.S. Representative
William Henry Harrison
Republican

The 1962 United States House of Representatives election in Wyoming was held on November 6, 1962. Incumbent Republican Congressman William Henry Harrison ran for re-election. He defeated Fremont County Attorney Gerry Spence in the Republican primary, and then faced attorney Louis Mankus, the Democratic nominee, in the general election. Harrison defeated Mankus in a landslide, winning re-election with 61 percent of the vote.

== Democratic primary ==
=== Candidates ===
- Louis A. Mankus, Cheyenne attorney, former congressional staffer
- Stephen W. Moyle, former Mayor of Laramie, 1958 Democratic candidate for Congress
- George W. K. Posvar, perennial candidate

=== Results ===
Democratic primary results
Party	Candidate	Votes	%
Democratic	Louis A. Mankus	16,474	50.05%
Democratic	Stephen W. Moyle	11,848	35.99%
Democratic	George W. K. Posvar	4,594	13.96%
Total votes		32,916	100.00%

== Republican primary ==
=== Candidates ===
- William Henry Harrison, incumbent U.S. Representative
- Gerry L. Spence, Fremont County Attorney

=== Results ===
Republican primary results
Party	Candidate	Votes	%
Republican	William Henry Harrison (inc.)	31,443	62.44%
Republican	Gerry L. Spence	18,911	37.56%
Total votes		50,354	100.00%

== General election ==
=== Results ===
1962 Wyoming's at-large congressional district general election results
Party	Candidate	Votes	%
Republican	William Henry Harrison (inc.)	71,489	61.38%
Democratic	Louis A. Mankus	44,985	38.62%
Total votes		116,474	100.00%
Republican hold			
