= Ted Ladd =

American researcher (born 1969)

- Born: 1969 (age 56–57)
- Education: Case Western Reserve University; Wharton School at the University of Pennsylvania; Johns Hopkins University; Cornell University
- Occupations: Entrepreneur and professor
- Spouse: Laura Hewitt Ladd

Ted Ladd is an American entrepreneur and academic at Harvard University and Hult International Business School.

== Career ==
Ladd is a professor of entrepreneurship at the Hult International Business School. Based on its San Francisco campus, he was the former Dean of the campus, Dean of Global Research, and founding Academic Director of the Doctorate in Business Administration. He also teaches students on Hult's campuses in Boston, New York, London, Shanghai, and Dubai. He also is an instructor on platform entrepreneurship at Harvard University. He was a visitor professor at Stanford University, Copenhagen Business School and the lead faculty member for social entrepreneurship at the Bainbridge Graduate School, now part of Presidio Graduate School.

Ladd was the Director of Ecosystems at WIMM Labs, which was acquired by Google as the foundation for its WearOS, powering smart watches from dozens of international brands. Ladd was the platform evangelist and company spokesman for Palm Inc. to describe the future of handheld mobile technology. He was the VP of Business Development at HOMER energy, which was acquired by UL. He founded, led, secured funding, sold, or otherwise participated in several other startups.

Ladd is a director of Lower Valley Energy, which serves electricity and natural gas to businesses and residents in northwestern Wyoming, as well as portions of eastern Idaho and southern Montana. He is on the Advisory Board of the Wyoming Small Business Development Center, which is jointly funded by the U.S. federal Small Business Administration, the University of Wyoming, and the Wyoming Business Council. He was a director of the latter from 2003 to 2009, appointed by Governor Freudenthal and confirmed by the Wyoming Senate. He served as a director of the Community Foundation of Jackson Hole. He was a candidate for Wyoming's sole seat in the U.S. House of Representatives in 2004. Following that race, Ladd was named one of Wyoming 40 under 40.

He is a member of the Advisory Board at Nth Venture, a venture studio that incubates early-stage start-up businesses. He is also a Strategic Advisor to Ethical Compass Advisors, a consulting firm that helps technology embed ethics into their governance structures. Clients include Meta, Anthropic, and several other large technology companies.

== Research ==
Ladd focuses on the processes by which entrepreneurs design and test new ideas to create new companies, especially as multi-sided platforms (e.g. Lyft and AirBnb). His recent publications include:

- A column at Forbes
- Innovating with Impact with Alessandro Lanteri, published by the Economist
- The Platform Canvas with Marcel Alleins and Markus Proesch, winner of the Best Conceptual Paper USASBE annual conference and described in Forbes
- "Success and Self-Confidence Through Rejection", TEDxHultAshridge
- "The Limits of Lean", Harvard Business Review
- "The Embedded Enterprise", Stanford Social Innovation Review
- "Customer Development and Effectuation: A Review of Textbooks to Teach a Contemporary Introduction of Entrepreneurship", Management Teaching Review
- "Business Models at the Bottom of the Pyramid: Leveraging Context in Undeveloped Markets." Proceedings of the Academy of Management Annual Meeting, 2014
- "How To Reinvent Your Business To Thrive After The Coronavirus" Forbes

A complete list can be found at ORCID.

== Awards ==
- Best Conceptual Paper at the U.S. Association for Small Business and Entrepreneurship annual conference
- Fulbright Scholarship: SyCip Distinguished Lecturing Award in the Philippines
- Research Fellow with the Engaged Practitioner-Scholar program at Case Western Reserve University
- Best Teacher in the Program at Hult: 2015, 2016, 2017, 2018, 2019, 2020, 2021, 2022, 2023, 2024.
- Paper "most relevant to practicing entrepreneurs" at the U.S. Association for Small Business and Entrepreneurship
- Best paper in Social Entrepreneurship at the Academy of Management

== Education ==
Ladd received a PhD in management from the Weatherhead School of Management at Case Western Reserve University, an MBA from the Wharton School at the University of Pennsylvania, a joint master's degree in international economics with honors from the School of Advanced International Studies (SAIS) from Johns Hopkins University, a BA from Cornell University cum laude as a triple major in biology (focused on ecology and systematics), government and technical sociology, and a farrier's certificate at the Oklahoma School of Horseshoeing.

== Personal ==
Ted Ladd and his wife, Laura Ladd, live in Jackson Hole, Wyoming with their dog, The Project.
