= Ed Kendig =

American politician

Member of the Wyoming Senate from the Goshen County and Platte County district
- In office 1963–1977

Personal details
- Born: Andrew Edward Kendig; June 25, 1925 Burns, Wyoming, U.S.
- Died: September 21, 2001 (aged 76) Wheatland, Wyoming, U.S.
- Party: Democratic
- Education: University of Colorado Boulder (BA); Harvard Law School (LLB)
- Occupation: Attorney

Ed Kendig (1925–2001) was an American politician and lawyer in the state of Wyoming. He served in the Wyoming Senate from 1963 to 1977. He was a member of the Democratic party.
