= 1944 United States House of Representatives election in Wyoming =

1944 United States House of Representatives election in Wyoming, At-large district
- November 7, 1944
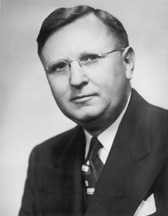
Nominee	Frank A. Barrett	Charles E. Norris
Party	Republican	Democratic
Popular vote	53,533	42,569
Percentage	55.70%	44.30%
U.S. Representative before election
Frank A. Barrett
Republican
Elected U.S. Representative
Frank A. Barrett
Republican

The 1944 United States House of Representatives election in Wyoming was held on November 7, 1944. Incumbent Republican Congressman Frank A. Barrett ran for re-election. He was challenged in the general election by Democratic nominee Charles E. Norris, a Union Pacific Railroad conductor. Barrett ultimately won his second term by a wide margin, defeating Norris with 56 percent of the vote.

== Democratic primary ==
=== Candidates ===
- Charles E. Norris, Union Pacific Railroad conductor
- Clyde C. Winters, Union Pacific Railroad conductor

=== Results ===
Democratic primary results
Party	Candidate	Votes	%
Democratic	Charles E. Norris	8,980	61.64%
Democratic	Clyde C. Winters	5,589	100.00%
Total votes		14,569	100.00%

== Republican primary ==
=== Candidates ===
- Frank A. Barrett, incumbent U.S. Representative

=== Results ===
Republican primary results
Party	Candidate	Votes	%
Republican	Frank A. Barrett (inc.)	17,843	100.00%
Total votes		17,843	100.00%

== General election ==
=== Results ===
1944 Wyoming's at-large congressional district general election results
Party	Candidate	Votes	%
Republican	Frank A. Barrett (inc.)	53,533	55.70%
Democratic	Charles E. Norris	42,569	44.30%
Total votes		96,102	100.00%
Republican hold			
