= Fifty-state strategy =

Political strategy in the United States

In the context of American politics, a fifty-state strategy is a political strategy which aims for progress in all states of the United States, rather than conceding certain states as "unwinnable". In a presidential campaign, it is usually implemented as an appeal to a broad base of the American public in an attempt to win, even if marginally, every state, since even a marginal victory is effectively a total victory for electoral purposes. It can also refer to an overall long-term strategy for a political movement such as a political party.

This strategy is very ambitious and, when used for a specific election, is typically abandoned as the election day draws nearer. In almost every state winning a state's popular vote for president or senator—even by a small margin—means the state's entire representation in the election goes to the victor without being divided. (Note: For presidential elections, Maine and Nebraska do not follow the winner-takes-all rule for their Electoral College seats. For U.S. Senate elections, a state's two seats can both end up in an election at the same time if at least one seat was vacated at the right time.) A fifty-state strategy requires a campaign to spend valuable resources in a rival's strongest states, when those resources could instead be concentrated in swing states that will become a total win or a total loss based on only a small difference in popular votes.

== Attempts ==
=== Successful ===
In 1972, Richard Nixon won 49 states, losing only Massachusetts (and the District of Columbia)

In 1984, Ronald Reagan won 49 states, losing only Minnesota (and the District of Columbia)

There have been three elections in which a president won every state. In 1788 and 1792, George Washington won all the electoral votes running effectively unopposed, and in 1820, James Monroe, running unopposed, carried all twenty-three states in the union at that time (although one electoral vote was cast for John Quincy Adams and two electors died prior to casting votes).

A complete fifty-state victory has not been accomplished since the fiftieth state was admitted into the union, though there have been several landslide victories:

- In 1964, with Lyndon B. Johnson losing Arizona, Louisiana, Mississippi, Alabama, Georgia, and South Carolina. However he won 61.1% of the popular vote, the most since James Monroe's uncontested reelection.
- In 1972, with Richard Nixon losing only the state of Massachusetts.
- In 1984, with Ronald Reagan losing only his rival's home state of Minnesota, where he was defeated by 4,000 votes and a 0.18% margin.

Both Nixon and Reagan also lost the District of Columbia, which has had presidential electors since the Twenty-Third Amendment in 1961.

=== Unsuccessful ===
Despite visiting all 50 states, Richard Nixon won only 26 states and lost the 1960 election.

In 1960, the first presidential election after the admission of Alaska and Hawaii, Richard Nixon pledged to visit all 50 states following his nomination at the Republican National Convention. Nixon was defeated in the general election by Democrat John F. Kennedy, in one of the closest presidential campaigns in American history. Many observers and commentators in succeeding years, such as Larry Sabato, have criticized Nixon's fifty-state pledge as a factor in his loss, suggesting that it forced him to place less emphasis on close states. Eight years later, in 1968, Nixon ran for president again and won a three-way race against Democrat Hubert Humphrey and independent candidate George Wallace. His achievement of visiting every state in his previous campaign made Nixon the first president ever to accomplish this task, though not during a winning campaign.

=== Mixed results ===
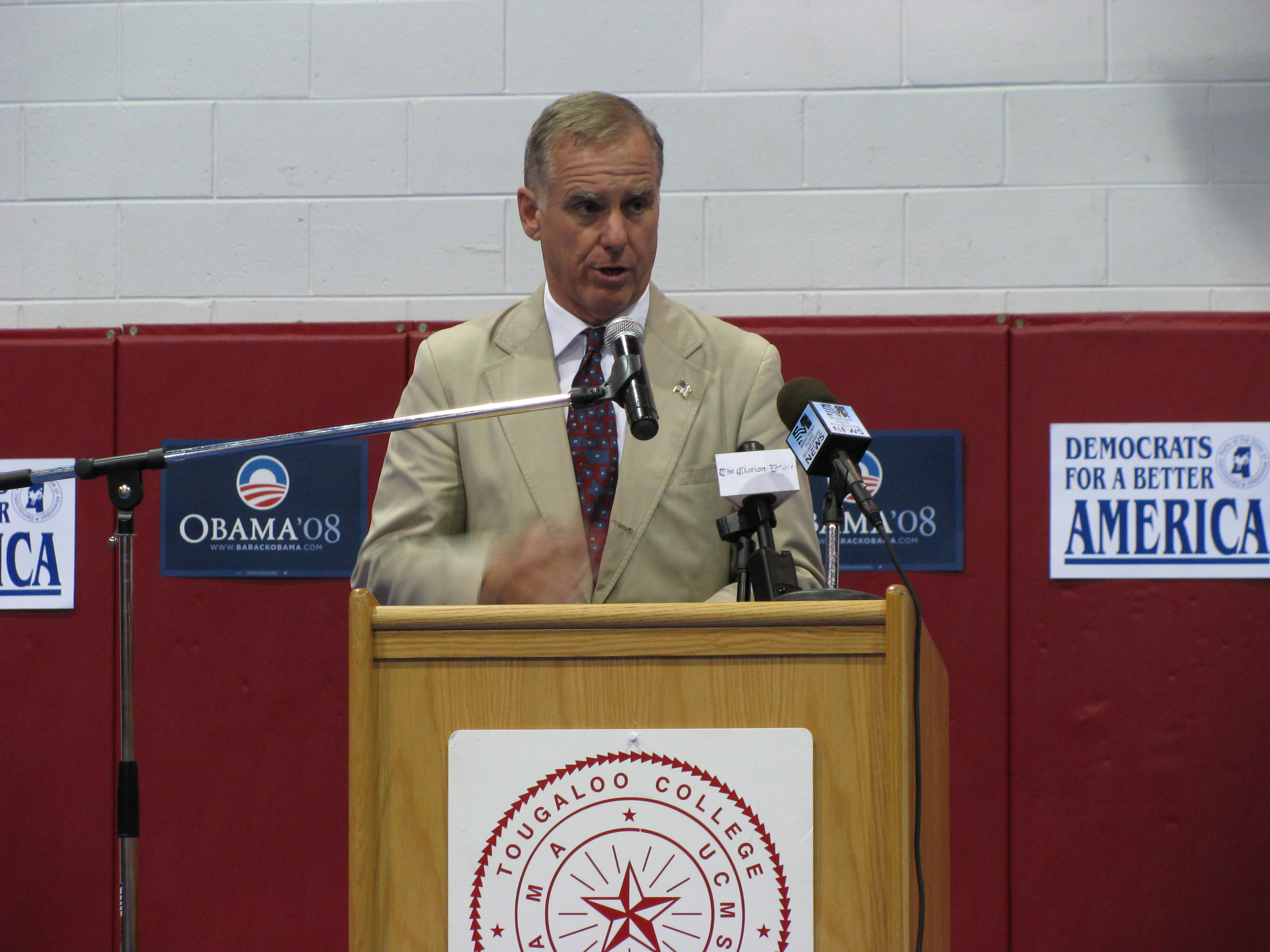
Howard Dean in 2008, during his time as chairman of the Democratic National Committee

Howard Dean pursued an explicit "fifty-state strategy" as chairman of the Democratic National Committee, putting resources into building a Democratic Party presence even where Democrats had been thought unlikely to win federal positions, in hopes that getting Democrats elected to local and state positions, and increasing awareness of Democrats in previously conceded areas, would result in growing successes in future elections. Democrats who supported the strategy have said that abandoning "red states" as lost causes only allowed the Republican Party to grow even stronger in areas where it was unchallenged, resulting in lopsided losses for Democrats in even more races.

During the 2008 United States presidential election, Barack Obama attempted a form of the fifty-state strategy to reach into deep red states to try to flip them. This was largely based on Obama's appeal during the primaries in very Republican states, like those in the Deep South and the Great Plains. In September, Obama scaled back his fifty-state strategy, abandoning Alaska and North Dakota and reducing staff in Georgia and Montana. John McCain's choice of Sarah Palin as his running mate made winning Alaska very unlikely for Obama, and she also had strong support in North Dakota. Obama was ultimately able to win Virginia and Indiana, which had not voted Democratic since 1964, and North Carolina, last won by a Democrat in 1976. Virginia has since become a reliably Democratic state. Additionally, the margins of victory in North Dakota, Georgia, and Montana were considerably closer than they had been in 2004.

== See also ==
- United States Electoral College
- Red states and blue states
