= 1918 United States House of Representatives election in Wyoming =

1918 United States House of Representatives election in Wyoming's at-large district
- November 5, 1918
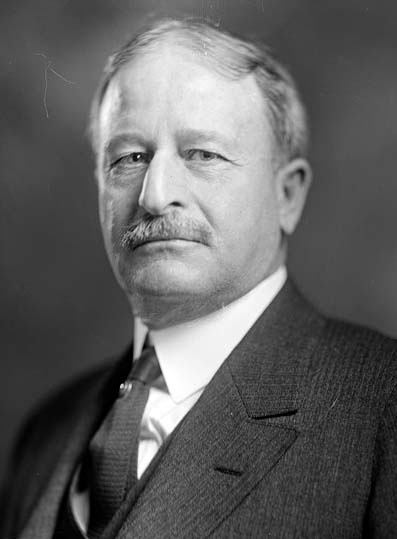
Nominee	Frank Wheeler Mondell	Hayden M. White
Party	Republican	Democratic
Popular vote	26,244	14,639
Percentage	64.19%	35.81%
U.S. Representative before election
Frank Wheeler Mondell
Republican
Elected U.S. Representative
Frank Wheeler Mondell
Republican

The 1918 House election in Wyoming was held on November 5, 1918. Incumbent Republican Congressman Frank Wheeler Mondell ran for re-election to a twelfth term in the U.S. House of Representatives. He was opposed by Democratic nominee Hayden M. White, the former Johnson County Prosecuting Attorney and the 1908 Democratic nominee for Congress. Owing in large part to the Republican landslide in 1918, Mondell handily defeated White to win re-election.

== Democratic primary ==
=== Candidates ===
- Hayden M. White, former Johnson County Prosecuting Attorney, 1908 Democratic nominee for Congress

=== Results ===
Democratic Party primary results
Party	Candidate	Votes	%
Democratic	Hayden M. White	5,668	100.00%
Total votes		5,668	100.00%

== Republican primary ==
=== Candidates ===
- Frank Wheeler Mondell, incumbent U.S. Congressman

=== Results ===
Republican primary results
Party	Candidate	Votes	%
Republican	Frank Wheeler Mondell (inc.)	13,420	100.00%
Total votes		13,420	100.00%

== General election ==
=== Results ===
1918 United States House of Representatives election in Wyoming
Party	Candidate	Votes	%
Republican	Frank Wheeler Mondell (inc.)	26,244	64.19%
Democratic	Hayden M. White	14,639	35.81%
Total votes		40,883	100.00%
Republican hold			
