= 2004 United States House of Representatives election in Wyoming =

2004 United States House of Representatives election in Wyoming's at-large district
- November 2, 2004
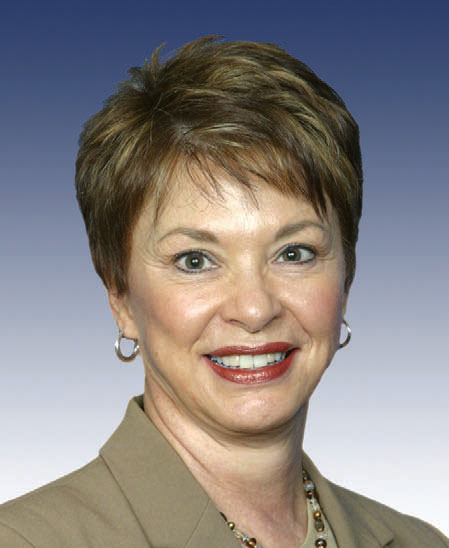
Nominee	Barbara Cubin	Ted Ladd
Party	Republican	Democratic
Popular vote	132,107	99,989
Percentage	55.35%	41.89%
- County results Cubin: 40–50% 50–60% 60–70% 70–80% Ladd: 50–60% 60–70%
U.S. Representative before election
Barbara Cubin
Republican
Elected U.S. Representative
Barbara Cubin
Republican

The 2004 United States House of Representatives election in Wyoming was held on November 2, 2004. Incumbent Republican Congresswoman Barbara Cubin ran for re-election to a sixth term. Cubin faced several challengers in the Republican primary, several of whom attacked her for missing votes in Congress. While Cubin won the primary, she received only 55 percent of the vote. In the general election, she was opposed by Ted Ladd, the Democratic nominee and a business consultant. While Cubin won re-election overwhelmingly, she won by a significantly narrower margin than President George W. Bush did in the presidential election, and lost two counties (Albany and Laramie) that Bush carried.

== Democratic primary ==
=== Candidates ===
- Ted Ladd, business consultant
- John I. Henley, Casper attorney
- Al Hamburg, perennial candidate

=== Results ===
Democratic primary results
Party	Candidate	Votes	%
Democratic	Ted Ladd	14,716	47.83%
Democratic	John I. Henley	13,208	42.93%
Democratic	Al Hamburg	2,845	9.25%
Total votes		30,769	100.00%

== Republican primary ==
=== Candidates ===
- Barbara Cubin, incumbent U.S. Representative
- Bruce S. Asay, Cheyenne attorney, Wyoming Army National Guard Assistant Adjutant General for Air
- Cale Case, State Senator
- Marvin "Trip" Applequist, Farson veterinarian and rancher
- Jim Altebaumer, Casper auto repairman and draftsman

=== Results ===
Republican primary results
Party	Candidate	Votes	%
Republican	Barbara Cubin (inc.)	45,433	55.01%
Republican	Bruce S. Asay	20,332	24.62%
Republican	Cale Case	13,104	15.87%
Republican	Marvin "Trip" Applequist	2,352	2.85%
Republican	Jim Altebaumer	1,374	1.66%
Total votes		82,595	100.00%

== Libertarian primary ==
=== Candidates ===
- Lewis Stock, Douglas rancher, Converse County Planning and Zoning Board

=== Results ===
Republican primary results
Party	Candidate	Votes	%
Libertarian	Lewis Stock	162	100.00%
Total votes		162	100.00%

== General election ==
=== Predictions ===
Source	Ranking	As of
The Cook Political Report	Safe R	October 29, 2004
Sabato's Crystal Ball	Safe R	November 1, 2004

=== Results ===
2004 Wyoming's at-large congressional district general election results
Party	Candidate	Votes	%
Republican	Barbara Cubin (inc.)	132,107	55.35%
Democratic	Ted Ladd	99,989	41.89%
Libertarian	Lewis Stock	6,581	2.76%
Total votes		238,677	100.00%
Republican hold			

==== Counties that flipped from Republican to Democratic ====
- Albany (Largest city: Laramie)
- Teton (Largest city: Jackson)
- Laramie (Largest city: Cheyenne)
