= 1990 United States House of Representatives election in Wyoming =

- November 6, 1990
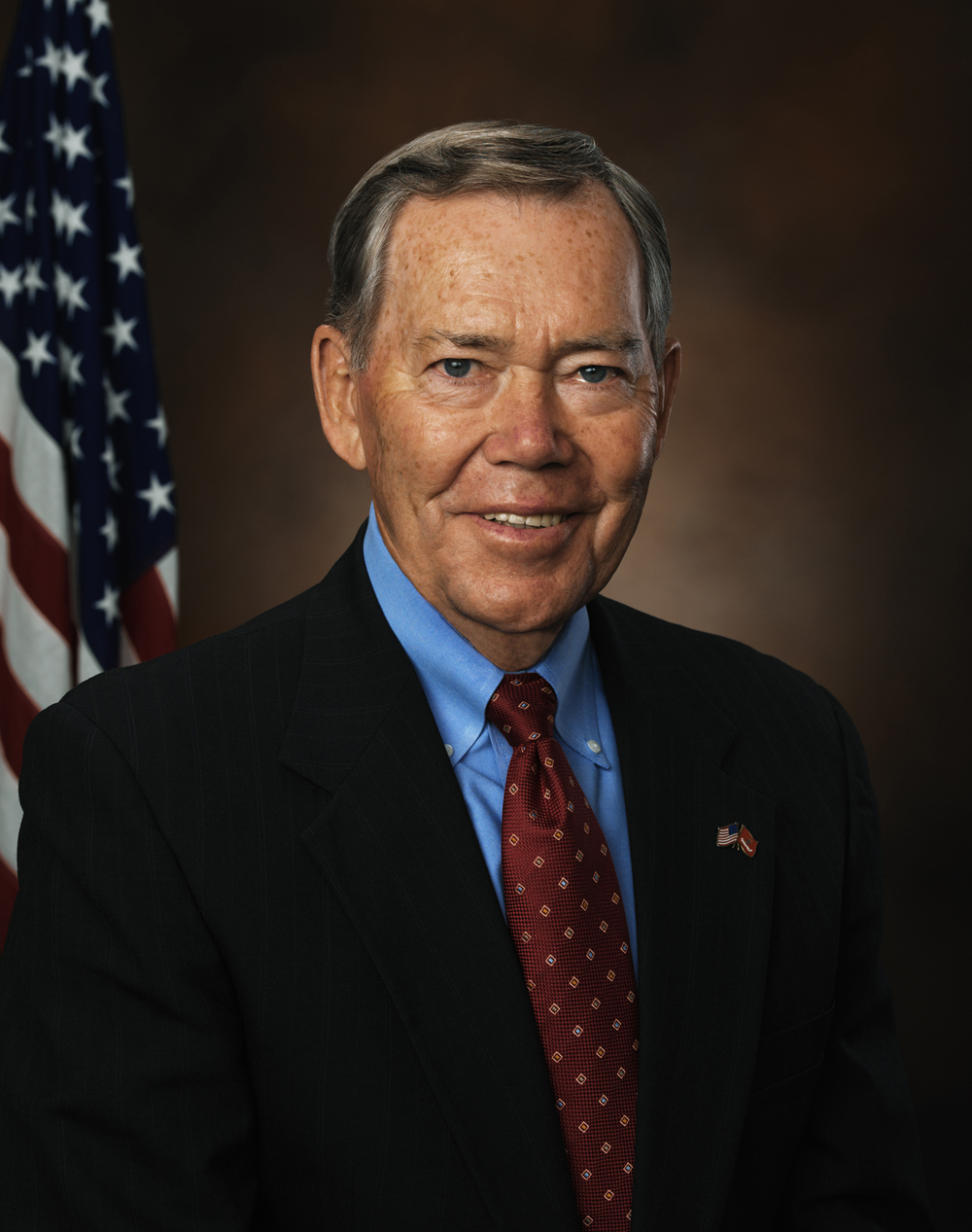

| Nominee | Craig L. Thomas | Pete Maxfield |
| Party | Republican | Democratic |
| Popular vote | 87,078 | 70,977 |
| Percentage | 55.09% | 44.91% |
- County results Thomas: 50–60% 60–70% 70–80% Maxfield: 50–60%
U.S. Representative before election
Craig L. Thomas
Republican
Elected U.S. Representative
Craig L. Thomas
Republican

The Wyoming United States House election for 1990 was held on November 6, 1990. The incumbent Representative Craig L. Thomas won his first regular election after winning the special election to fill the empty seat of Dick Cheney. Thomas defeated Pete Maxfield with 55.09% of the vote.

== Results ==
United States House of Representatives elections in Wyoming, 1990
| Party | Candidate | Votes | % |
|---|---|---|---|
| Republican | Craig L. Thomas (incumbent) | 87,078 | 55.09% |
| Democratic | Pete Maxfield | 70,977 | 44.91% |
| Total votes | | 158,055 | 100% |
