= 1958 United States House of Representatives election in Wyoming =

- November 4, 1958
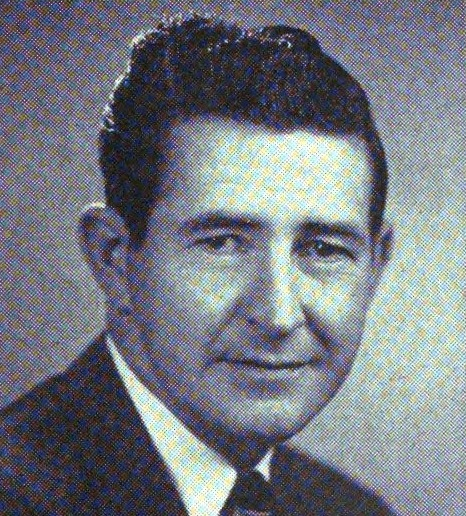
Nominee	Keith Thomson	Ray Whitaker
Party	Republican	Democratic
Popular vote	59,894	51,886
Percentage	53.58%	46.42%
U.S. Representative before election
Keith Thomson
Republican
Elected U.S. Representative
Keith Thomson
Republican

The 1958 United States House of Representatives election in Wyoming was held on November 4, 1958. Incumbent Republican Congressman Keith Thomson ran for re-election. He was opposed by Natrona County Attorney Ray Whitaker, the Democratic nominee. As the national mood favored Democrats, Thomson's margin of victory narrowed considerably from 1956, but he still won by a solid margin, receiving 54 percent of the vote to Whitaker's 46 percent.

== Democratic primary ==
=== Candidates ===
- Ray Whitaker, Natrona County Attorney
- Stephen W. Moyle, former Mayor of Laramie
- George W. K. Posvar, perennial candidate

=== Results ===
Democratic primary results
Party	Candidate	Votes	%
Democratic	Ray Whitaker	24,532	72.82%
Democratic	Stephen W. Moyle	6,191	18.38%
Democratic	George W. K. Posvar	2,964	8.80%
Total votes		33,687	100.00%

== Republican primary ==
=== Candidates ===
- Keith Thomson, incumbent U.S. Representative

=== Results ===
Republican primary results
Party	Candidate	Votes	%
Republican	Keith Thomson (inc.)	34,675	100.00%
Total votes		34,675	100.00%

== General election ==
=== Results ===
1958 Wyoming's at-large congressional district general election results
Party	Candidate	Votes	%
Republican	Keith Thomson (inc.)	59,894	53.58%
Democratic	Ray Whitaker	51,886	46.42%
Total votes		111,780	100.00%
Republican hold			
