= 1954 United States Senate elections in Wyoming =

- November 2, 1954
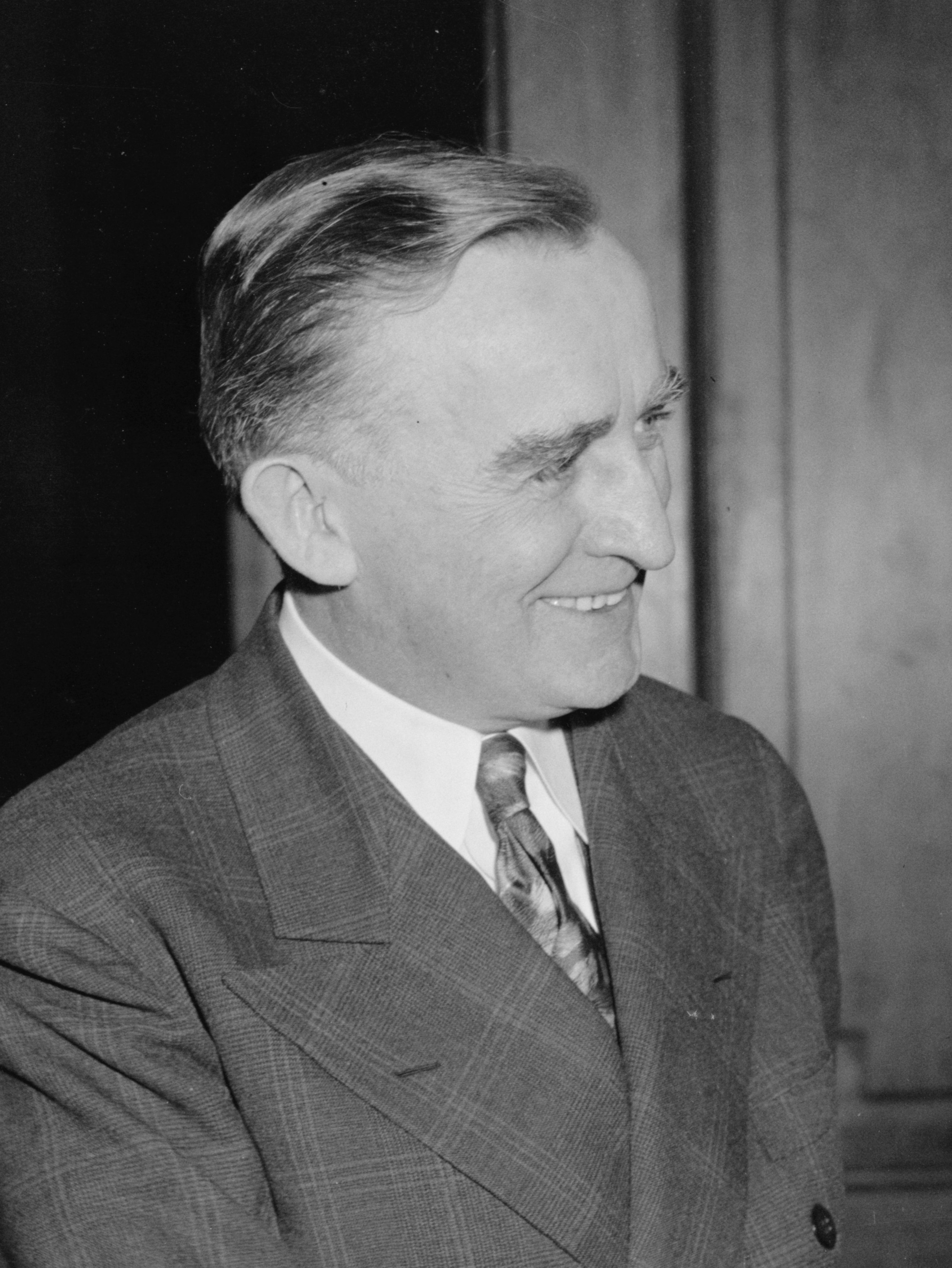

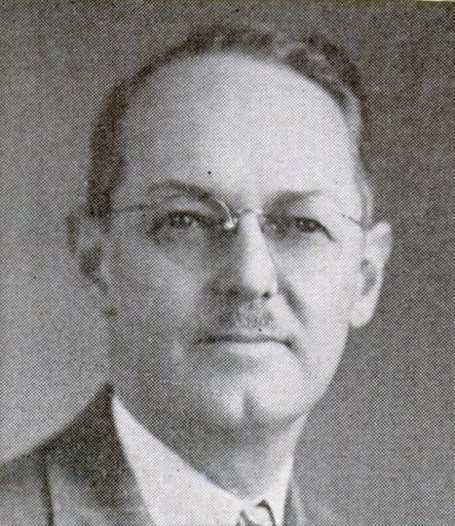
Nominee	Joseph C. O'Mahoney	William Henry Harrison III
Party	Democratic	Republican
Regular election	57,845; 51.53%	54,407; 48.47%
Special election	57,163; 51.56%	53,705; 48.44%
- County results O'Mahoney: 50–60% 60–70% 70–80% Harrison: 50–60% 60–70%
U.S. senator before election
Edward D. Crippa
Republican
Elected U.S. Senator
Joseph C. O'Mahoney
Democratic

The 1954 United States Senate elections in Wyoming took place on November 2, 1954. Incumbent Democratic senator Lester C. Hunt, who decided not to be a candidate for re-election, committed suicide by firearm on June 19, 1954, and Republican Governor Clifford J. Rogers appointed former state highway commissioner Edward D. Crippa to replace him. Two elections for the Senate seat were held on the same day; one as a special election to fill the remainder of Hunt's original six-year term, and another to select a senator to serve the next six-year term. Senator Crippa did not run for re-election.

Congressman William Henry Harrison III won a contested Republican primary and advanced to the general election, where he faced former senator Joseph C. O'Mahoney, the Democratic nominee. In the midst of a largely neutral political environment—Democrats gained a handful of seats in Congress nationwide, which enabled them to flip the Senate, while Republican Milward Simpson narrowly won the gubernatorial election—O'Mahoney narrowly defeated Harrison to return to the Senate.

As of 2025, this is the last time Democrats won Wyoming's Class 2 Senate seat.

== Democratic primary ==
=== Candidates ===
- Joseph C. O'Mahoney, former U.S. Senator
- Carl A. Johnson (only filed for the special election)

=== Results ===
==== Regular election ====
Democratic primary
Party	Candidate	Votes	%
Democratic	Joseph C. O'Mahoney	29,676	88.16%
Democratic	Carl A. Johnson	3,985	11.84%
Total votes		33,661	100.00%

==== Special election ====
Special Democratic primary
Party	Candidate	Votes	%
Democratic	Joseph C. O'Mahoney	31,549	100.00%
Total votes		31,549	100.00%

== Republican primary ==
=== Candidates ===
- William Henry Harrison III, U.S. Congressman from Wyoming's at-large congressional district
- Sam C. Hyatt, former president of the American National Cattlemen's Association
- Ewing T. Kerr, former chairman of the Republican Party of Wyoming
- William J. Taber, auto dealer

=== Results ===
==== Regular election ====
Republican primary
Party	Candidate	Votes	%
Republican	William Henry Harrison III	23,119	51.55%
Republican	Sam C. Hyatt	10,643	23.73%
Republican	Ewing T. Kerr	10,374	23.13%
Republican	William J. Taber	709	1.58%
Total votes		44,845	100.00%

==== Special election ====
Republican primary
Party	Candidate	Votes	%
Republican	William Henry Harrison III	22,257	49.98%
Republican	Sam C. Hyatt	10,832	24.32%
Republican	Ewing T. Kerr	10,601	23.81%
Republican	William J. Taber	841	1.89%
Total votes		44,531	100.00%

== General election ==
=== Results ===
==== Regular election ====
1954 United States Senate election in Wyoming
Party	Candidate	Votes	%	±%
Democratic	Joseph C. O'Mahoney	57,845	51.53%	−5.58%
Republican	William Henry Harrison III	54,407	48.47%	+5.58%
Majority		3,438	3.06%	−11.15%
Turnout		112,252		
Democratic gain from Republican				

==== Special election ====
1954 United States Senate special election in Wyoming
Party	Candidate	Votes	%	±%
Democratic	Joseph C. O'Mahoney	57,163	51.56%	−5.55%
Republican	William Henry Harrison III	53,705	48.44%	+5.55%
Majority		3,458	3.12%	−11.10%
Turnout		110,868		
Democratic gain from Republican				
