= 1948 United States House of Representatives election in Wyoming =

- November 2, 1948
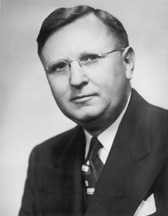
Nominee	Frank A. Barrett	Pat Flannery
Party	Republican	Democratic
Popular vote	50,218	47,246
Percentage	51.52%	48.48%
U.S. Representative before election
Frank A. Barrett
Republican
Elected U.S. Representative
Frank A. Barrett
Republican

The 1948 United States House of Representatives election in Wyoming was held on November 2, 1948. Incumbent Republican Congressman Frank A. Barrett ran for re-election to a fourth term. He was challenged by Democratic nominee Pat Flannery, an aide to U.S. Senator Joseph C. O'Mahoney. As President Harry S. Truman won the state in the presidential election, Barrett narrowly won re-election, defeating Flannery with 52 percent of the vote.

== Democratic primary ==
=== Candidates ===
- Pat Flannery, aide to U.S. Senator Joseph C. O'Mahoney
- Joe McGowan, editor of the Wyoming-Utah Labor Journal
- Sidney G. Kornegay, Cheyenne contractor

=== Results ===
Democratic primary results
Party	Candidate	Votes	%
Democratic	Pat Flannery	14,172	65.27%
Democratic	Joe McGowan	5,599	25.79%
Democratic	Sidney G. Kornegay	1,941	8.94%
Total votes		21,712	100.00%

== Republican primary ==
=== Candidates ===
- Frank A. Barrett, incumbent U.S. Representative

=== Results ===
Republican primary results
Party	Candidate	Votes	%
Republican	Frank A. Barrett (inc.)	23,074	100.00%
Total votes		23,074	100.00%

== General election ==
=== Results ===
1948 Wyoming's at-large congressional district general election results
Party	Candidate	Votes	%
Republican	Frank A. Barrett (inc.)	50,218	51.52%
Democratic	Pat Flannery	47,246	48.48%
Total votes		97,464	100.00%
Republican hold			
