= Keith Thomson (politician) =

American politician

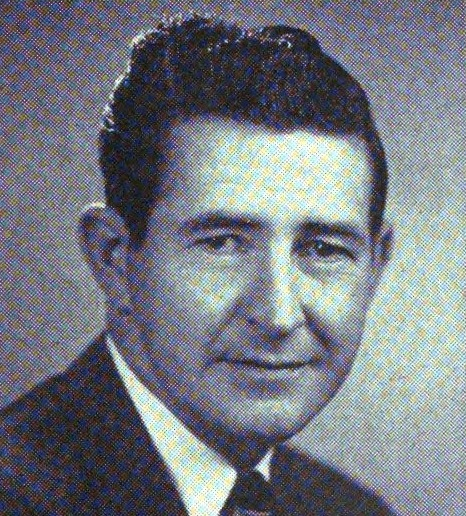

United States Senator-elect from Wyoming
- Died before assuming office
- Preceded by: Joseph C. O'Mahoney (as senator)
- Succeeded by: John J. Hickey (as senator)

Member of the U.S. House of Representatives from Wyoming's at-large district
- In office January 3, 1955 – December 9, 1960
- Preceded by: William Henry Harrison III
- Succeeded by: William Henry Harrison III

Member of the Wyoming House of Representatives
- In office 1952–1954

Personal details
- Born: Edwin Keith Thomson; February 8, 1919 Newcastle, Wyoming, U.S.
- Died: December 9, 1960 (aged 41) Cody, Wyoming, U.S.
- Resting place: Arlington National Cemetery
- Party: Republican
- Spouse: Thyra Godfrey (m. 1939)
- Children: 3
- Education: University of Wyoming (LLB)

Military service
- Allegiance: United States
- Branch/service: United States Army
- Years of service: 1941–1946
- Rank: Lieutenant Colonel
- Battles/wars: World War II

Edwin Keith Thomson (February 8, 1919 – December 9, 1960), usually known as Keith Thomson, was a United States representative from Wyoming. A highly decorated World War II veteran, Thomson served three terms in Wyoming's only U.S. House seat. On November 8, 1960, he was elected to the U.S. Senate, but died a month later of a heart attack before taking office.

== Early life ==
Born in Newcastle, Wyoming, he grew up on a ranch in Crook County and attended public schools in Beulah, Wyoming, and Spearfish, South Dakota. He graduated in 1941 from the University of Wyoming Law School in Laramie. While in law school he met his wife, Thyra Godfrey Thomson, and they were married in 1939.

== Military service ==
Thomson was called to active duty on March 24, 1941 and commanded the Second Battalion, 362nd Infantry Regiment, 91st Division. He was released from active duty as a lieutenant colonel on January 24, 1946. He had been admitted to the bar in 1941 and commenced the practice of law in Cheyenne in February 1946; he was a delegate to the 1952 Republican National Convention in Chicago and was a member of the Wyoming House of Representatives from 1952 to 1954.

== Political career ==
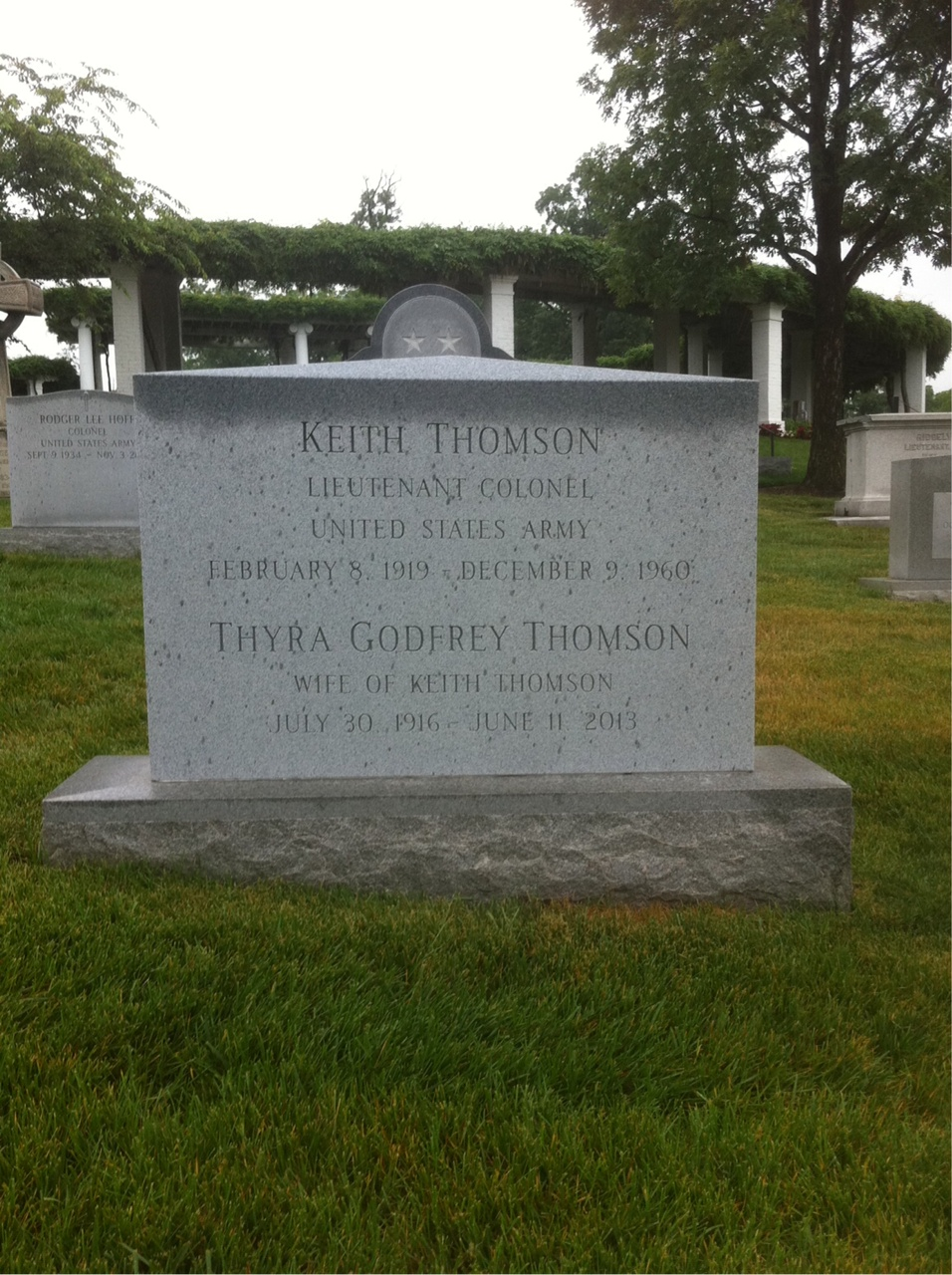
Grave at Arlington National Cemetery

Thomson was elected as a member of the Republican Party to the 84th, 85th, and 86th Congresses and served from January 3, 1955, until his death. Thomson voted in favor of the Civil Rights Acts of 1957 and 1960. He did not seek renomination to the Eighty-seventh Congress, but was elected to the United States Senate on November 8, 1960, for the term commencing January 3, 1961. However, he died of a heart attack in Cody, Wyoming in December, before his term in the Senate began. Democratic Governor John J. Hickey appointed himself to the seat but was defeated in a 1962 special election to serve out the term by Republican Milward L. Simpson. Thomson was interred at Arlington National Cemetery.

Following Thomson's death, his wife Thyra Thomson was elected in 1962 as Wyoming Secretary of State. She was re-elected to five more terms, and served in that office for 24 years, until 1987.

== See also ==
- List of members of the United States Congress who died in office (1950–1999)

U.S. House of Representatives
| Preceded by William Harrison | Member of the U.S. House of Representatives from Wyoming's at-large congressional district 1955–1960 | Succeeded by William Harrison |
Party political offices
| Preceded by William Harrison | Republican nominee for U.S. Senator from Wyoming (Class 2); 1960 | Succeeded by Milward Simpson |
U.S. Senate
| Preceded by Joseph C. O'Mahoney | U.S. Senator-elect (Class 1) from Wyoming; 1960; Served alongside: Gale W. McGee | Succeeded by John J. Hickey |
