= William Henry Harrison III =

American politician (1896–1990)

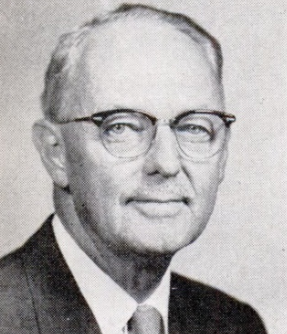
- Pocket Congressional Directory, 1961

Member of the U.S. House of Representatives from Wyoming's at-large district
- In office January 3, 1967 – January 3, 1969
- Preceded by: Teno Roncalio
- Succeeded by: John S. Wold
- In office January 3, 1961 – January 3, 1965
- Preceded by: Edwin Keith Thomson
- Succeeded by: Teno Roncalio
- In office January 3, 1951 – January 3, 1955
- Preceded by: Frank A. Barrett
- Succeeded by: Edwin Keith Thomson

Chairman of the Sheridan County Republican Party
- In office 1948–1950
- Preceded by: George D. Johnson
- Succeeded by: William J. Fleming

Member of the Wyoming House of Representatives from Sheridan County
- In office 1945–1950

Member of the Indiana House of Representatives from Marion County
- In office January 6, 1927 – January 10, 1929

Personal details
- Born: August 10, 1896 Terre Haute, Indiana, U.S.
- Died: October 8, 1990 (aged 94) St. Petersburg, Florida, U.S.
- Party: Republican
- Spouses: Mary Elizabeth Newton (m. 1920; died 1978) Dorothy Foster Smith (m. 1981)
- Children: 2
- Parent(s): Mary Saunders; Russell Benjamin Harrison
- Relatives: Harrison family of Virginia; Alvin Saunders
- Education: University of Nebraska Omaha (attended)

Military service
- Branch/service: Aviation Section, U.S. Signal Corps
- Rank: Private
- Battles/wars: World War I World War II; Cold War

William Henry Harrison III (August 10, 1896 – October 8, 1990) was an American politician who served in the United States House of Representatives and in the state legislatures of Indiana and Wyoming.

Harrison grew up in Indiana, and was educated in Omaha, Nebraska and Washington, D.C. Both his grandfather Benjamin Harrison and great-great-grandfather William Henry Harrison served as presidents of the United States. During World War I he served in the Aviation Section, U.S. Signal Corps and later served as a park ranger in multiple national parks. He entered politics in Indiana with his election to the Indiana House of Representatives. Harrison unsuccessfully sought election to the United States House of Representatives in 1932 in Indiana.

In 1944, Harrison entered politics in Wyoming with his election to the Wyoming House of Representatives. In 1950, Harrison was elected to the United States House of Representatives from Wyoming's at-large congressional district and served multiple non-consecutive terms throughout the 1950s and 1960s due to unsuccessful campaigns for reelection and a campaign for the United States Senate. In the House of Representatives he supported an interventionist foreign policy, anti-communism, Native American rights, and development in Wyoming.

On May 29, 1969, President Richard Nixon appointed Harrison to the Federal Renegotiation Board. He served until his resignation on October 4, 1971. During the 1980 Republican presidential primaries he served on the Wyoming Steering Committee for George H. W. Bush's presidential campaign.

== Early life ==
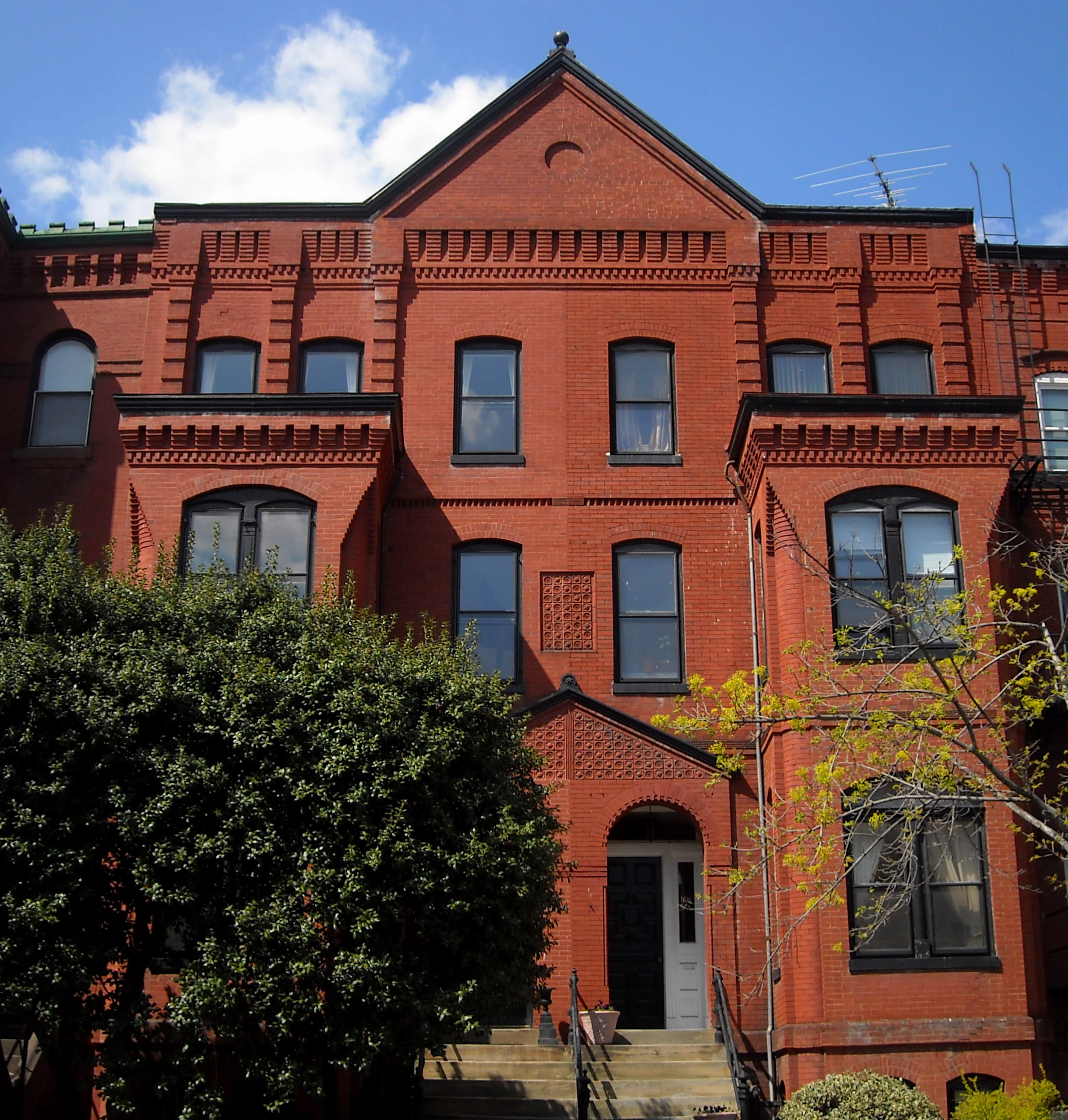
William H. Harrison's former residence in Washington, D.C.

William Henry Harrison III was born on August 10, 1896, in Terre Haute, Indiana, to Russell Benjamin Harrison and Mary Saunders. He was a member of the Harrison family of Virginia and was a great-great-grandson of President William Henry Harrison, a great-grandnephew of William Henry Harrison Jr., a great-grandson of John Scott Harrison, and a grandson of President Benjamin Harrison. His maternal grandfather was Alvin Saunders, who had served as the territorial governor and senator from Nebraska. He attended public schools in Omaha, Nebraska and the Sidwell Friends School in Washington, D.C.

During World War I, Harrison served in the Aviation Section, U.S. Signal Corps of the United States Army as a private. He later served as a park ranger at Yellowstone and Glacier National Parks. He became a member of the American Legion and Veterans of Foreign Wars.

During 1919 and 1920, Harrison attended the University of Nebraska Omaha. On October 19, 1920, he married Mary Elizabeth Newton. In 1925, Harrison was admitted to the bar in Indiana.

== Career ==
=== Indiana ===
While studying at the University of Nebraska Omaha, Harrison joined the Junior Chamber of Commerce in Omaha, Nebraska. In 1923, he went to Indianapolis and served on the city's Junior Chamber of Commerce board of directors until he was selected to serve as the president. In 1926, he attended the Junior Chamber of Commerce national convention in Jacksonville, Florida, to represent Indiana and parts of Ohio and Kentucky.

In 1926, Harrison was elected to the Indiana House of Representatives to represent Marion County and served until 1929. While he was serving in the House his father was serving in the Indiana Senate. In 1928, he ran for Marion County attorney, but was defeated.

On December 2, 1931, Harrison was elected as president of the Universal Club, a welfare and education organization, which held its meetings at the Columbia Club, which was formed by local Republicans who had supported the presidential campaign of Benjamin Harrison.

In 1932, Harrison received the Republican nomination for Indiana's 12th congressional district. During the campaign he praised President Herbert Hoover and was endorsed by the prohibitionist Anti-Saloon League in the primary and the anti-prohibitionist Association Against the Prohibition Amendment in the general election. In the general election he was defeated by incumbent Representative Louis Ludlow.

=== Wyoming House of Representatives ===
Harrison owned land in Wyoming and would go on vacation to his farms in the state. In 1937, he purchased the IXL Ranch in Dayton, Wyoming, from Jack B. Milward. He moved to the IXL Ranch and practiced law in Sheridan, Wyoming.

In 1944, Harrison was elected to represent Sheridan County in the Wyoming House of Representatives as a Republican. In the House of Representatives, he served alongside another William Henry Harrison, who was also named after President William Henry Harrison and was born in 1895, from Laramie County. Both he and the Harrison from Laramie County had sons named William Henry Harrison. In 1949, Harrison co-sponsored a bill to reorganize the Game and Fish Commission into the Game and Fish Department.

In 1948, Harrison was elected to serve as the chairman of the Sheridan County Republican Party after the resignation of former chairman George D. Johnson. National Republican Committeeman Frank Horton declined renomination due to health problems. At the party's state convention, Harrison supported W. J. Wehrli to succeed Horton, but only the Natrona County delegation backed Wehrli. The post was won by Ted Crippa, a banker and former member of the state highway commission. In April 1950, Harrison resigned to focus on his congressional campaign and was replaced by William J. Fleming.

=== U.S. House of Representatives ===
==== 1951–1955 ====
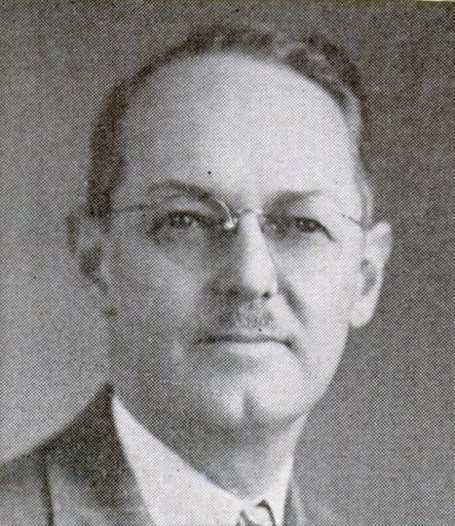
William Henry Harrison III in 1953

On December 16, 1949, Representative Frank A. Barrett announced that he would not seek reelection. On December 19, Harrison announced that he would seek the Republican nomination for Wyoming's at-large congressional district and filed to run on May 31, 1950. During the primary he spent $1,752.42 and defeated Deputy Secretary of State T. C. Thompson and Homer Oxley for the Republican nomination on August 22. In the general election he defeated John B. Clark with fifty-four percent of the popular vote.

During the 82nd session of the House of Representatives, Harrison was appointed to serve on the Agriculture and Interior and Insular Affairs House Committees and the Public Lands, Indian Affairs, and Irrigation and Reclamation House subcommittees.

On May 7, 1952, Harrison announced that he would seek reelection to the House of Representatives in a letter to Ewing T. Kerr, the chairman of the Wyoming Republican Party, and filed to run on May 27. Governor Frank A. Barrett stated that he was pleased by Harrison's running for reelection and a resolution endorsing Harrison was passed at the Wyoming Republican state convention. He faced no opposition for renomination in the Republican primary and spent $20 during the primary. Harrison was supposed to accompany vice presidential nominee Richard Nixon at campaign rallies in Sheridan, Casper, Laramie, and Rock Springs, but those events were cancelled as Nixon campaigned in Wheeling, West Virginia. In October, Wisconsin Senator Joseph McCarthy campaigned for Harrison's reelection to the House and Governor Frank A. Barrett for election to the Senate against incumbent Senator Joseph C. O'Mahoney. In the general election he defeated state representative Robert R. Rose Jr. with sixty percent of the popular vote after spending $2,385.14.

During the 83rd session of the House of Representatives, Harrison was reappointed to serve on the Interior and Insular Affairs House Committee.

==== U.S. Senate election ====
In 1953, it was speculated that Harrison would run in the 1954 Senate election against incumbent Democratic Senator Lester C. Hunt, but on February 5, 1954, he announced in a press release that he would not run in the Senate election and later announced that he would run for reelection to the House in June.

However, on June 8, Hunt dropped out of the Senate election after threats were made to use his son's homosexuality against him and citing health concerns. On June 10, Harrison announced that he would run in the Senate election and Morton Spence dropped out of the Republican primary and endorsed him. On June 19, Hunt committed suicide and although Harrison was speculated as a possible interim appointee, Harrison stated that Governor Clifford Joy Rogers should not appoint a Republican senatorial candidate. On June 24, Edward D. Crippa was appointed to serve the remainder of Hunt's term.

Following Hunt's suicide a special election was ordered and Harrison filed to run for the Republican nomination. In the special and general Republican primaries Harrison defeated Sam C. Hyatt, Ewing T. Kerr, and W. J. Taber after spending $4,704. Former Senator Joseph C. O'Mahoney, who had lost reelection in 1952, defeated Harrison in both the special and general elections. During the campaign Harrison spent $2,500.

==== Interlude ====
On April 8, 1955, Harrison was appointed as the Southern regional administrator for the Housing and Home Finance Agency and sworn in on April 11, to succeed McClellan Ratchford, who had been the acting administrator since the retirement of Joseph H. Dupuy on January 1. He was headquartered in Atlanta, Georgia, and administered Alabama, Florida, Georgia, Kentucky, Mississippi, Tennessee, North Carolina, and South Carolina. On August 22, 1956, he announced his resignation which would take effect on August 31.

After leaving the Housing and Home Finance Agency, Harrison worked for the farm division of the Republican National Committee in Chicago, Illinois. On October 17, the Wyoming Public Service Commission authorized him to build and operate a community television system in Pine Bluffs, Wyoming. On December 6, Vincennes University gave Harrison an honorary Doctor of Law degree on the 150th anniversary of its foundation by William Henry Harrison. Harrison later resigned from his position as congressional liaison for the Housing and Home Finance Agency so that he could lead the Barrett-for-Senator Committee in Sheridan County during the 1958 election.

==== 1961–1965 ====
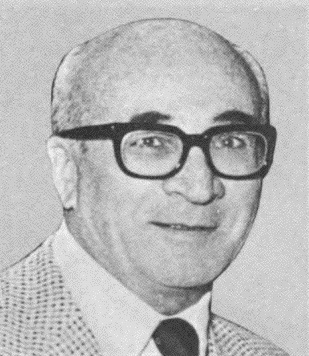
Teno Roncalio

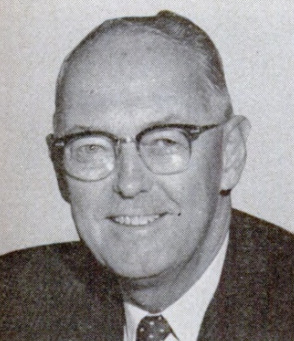
William Henry Harrison III

Harrison was defeated by Teno Roncalio in the 1964 House of Representatives election.

On September 10, 1959, Harrison announced at the Wyoming State Bar Association convention that he would run for the Republican nomination in either the Senate or House election. On October 29, he announced that he would seek the Republican nomination for Wyoming's at-large congressional district. On May 24, 1960, Harrison filed to run in the Republican primary and narrowly defeated Kenneth L. Sailors, Mark Cox, Walter Kingham, and R. L. Greene after spending $8,897. In the general election, he defeated Democratic nominee Hepburn T. Armstrong.

During the 86th session of the House of Representatives, Harrison was reappointed to serve on the Interior and Insular Affairs House Committee. In the Interior and Insular Affairs House Committee, he served on the Irrigation and Reclamation, Mining, and Indian Affairs subcommittees.

On April 25, 1962, Harrison announced that he would seek another term in the House of Representatives and filed for renomination in the Republican primary on July 5. In the Republican primary, he defeated G. L. Spence after spending $11,418. During the general election, Harrison was forced to suspend campaign activity to attend a top security meeting, open to only members of Congress and governors, regarding the Cuban Missile Crisis. In the general election, Harrison defeated Democratic nominee Lou Mankus.

During the 87th session of the House of Representatives, Harrison left the Interior and Insular Affairs House Committee and became the ranking Republican on the Interior subcommittee of the House Committee on Appropriations, which handled funding for the Forest Service and Department of the Interior.

It was speculated that Harrison would run against incumbent Democratic Senator Gale W. McGee in the 1964 Senate election, but on January 29, 1964, he announced that he would not run in the Senate election and would, instead run for reelection to the House. In the general election, he was narrowly defeated by Teno Roncalio, who benefited from the coattail effect of President Lyndon B. Johnson's victory in Wyoming against Republican presidential nominee Barry Goldwater.

==== 1967–1969 ====
On February 17, 1966, Harrison announced in a letter to Republican state chairman Stan Hathaway that he would seek election to Wyoming's congressional district and defeated Roy Peck in the Republican primary. In the general election he defeated Democratic nominee Al Christian with 52% of the popular vote.

During the 89th session of the House of Representatives, Harrison was appointed to serve on the interior and Agriculture subcommittees of the House Committee on Appropriations. However, he would resign from his committee assignments on October 3, 1968, and gave his posts to Wendell Wyatt.

On February 12, 1968, Harrison announced that he would seek reelection at a press conference in a Ramada Inn. Ben Reifel, the only Native American in the House of Representatives, opened Harrison's formal campaign announcement and Harrison later filed to run on July 3. During the primary campaign, he was endorsed by Republican House Conference Chairman Melvin Laird, House Minority Leader Gerald Ford, Representatives Ben Reifel and Frank T. Bow, and actor John Wayne. In the Republican primary, Harrison was defeated by John S. Wold. There was an unsuccessful attempt by former Governor Leslie A. Miller, Tex Ellis, David G. Laird, Vincent Vehar, and David Hitchcock to have Wold replaced by Harrison after Wold refused to file his campaign expenditure, income taxes, and primary election statement.

== Later life ==
On May 29, 1969, President Richard Nixon appointed Harrison to the Federal Renegotiation Board and was later approved by the Senate. He served on the board until his resignation on October 4, 1971. During the 1980 Republican presidential primaries, Harrison served on the Wyoming Steering Committee for George H. W. Bush's presidential campaign.

In 1971, Harrison moved to North Redington Beach, Florida, but still held property in Wyoming. In 1981, he married Dorothy Foster Smith. In 1981, Harrison attended Ronald Reagan's President's Ball at the Columbia Club in Indianapolis, Indiana.

Before Harrison's death, he donated historical materials relating to the Harrison family to the Indiana Historical Society. On October 8, 1990, Harrison died of heart failure at Palms of Pasadena Hospital in St. Petersburg, Florida. He was 94 years old.

== Political positions ==
=== Domestic ===
In 1950, Harrison, E. L. Chamberlain, Louis Boschetto, and Robert R. Rose proposed legislation to repeal a 1949 lien law that would allow counties to place liens on the estates of pensioners to reclaim the money spent on benefits given to the pensioners. However, the bill died in committee on February 22.

In 1961, Harrison criticized President John F. Kennedy's proposal to raise the debt limit from $293 billion to $300 billion. On November 7, 1963, the House of Representatives voted 187 to 179, with Harrison voting against, in favor of raising the debt limit to $315 billion.

On February 10, 1964, Harrison voted against the Civil Rights Act of 1964.

==== Amendments ====
During the 1932 House election, Harrison gave support to maintaining and repealing the 18th Amendment which banned the production, transport, and sale of intoxicating liquors.

In 1961, Harrison sent telegrams to Speaker Sam Rayburn and President pro tempore Carl Hayden asking them to work for the passage of an amendment giving residents of Washington, D.C., the ability to vote in presidential elections.

In 1963, Harrison introduced a resolution which would amend the Constitution to permit voluntary prayer in schools. On September 10, he and sixty other representatives sponsored a resolution which would amend the Constitution to allow school prayer.

==== Anti-communism ====
While running for the House of Representatives in 1950, Harrison accused communists of controlling multiple areas in governments. In December 1953, he praised Senator Joseph McCarthy's Senate investigations into communist governmental infiltration.

On September 22, 1950, President Harry S. Truman vetoed the McCarran Internal Security Act, which would force communist organizations to register with the United States Attorney General and establish other anti-communist regulations, stating that the act would only help communists. On September 22, the House and Senate voted to override Truman's veto of the bill. On September 24, Harrison praised the bill and the Democratic controlled Congress for overriding Truman's veto.

On September 5, 1961, Harrison introduced legislation to prohibit the receipt, handling, and transportation of mail determined to be communist propaganda by the attorney general.

==== Development ====
Harrison opposed the Central Arizona Project, which diverted water from the Colorado River into central and southern Arizona. He and Frank A. Barrett supported Newcastle, Wyoming's bid for a uranium processing plant and Harrison asked for the Atomic Energy Commission to not select a location for the uranium processing plant until he was able to present Newcastle as an option. In 1962, Harrison opposed the creation of a steam-generated power facility at the Hanford Site in Hanford, Washington.

In May 1953, Harrison wrote a letter to President Dwight D. Eisenhower and Secretary of the Interior Douglas McKay asking for Fort Phil Kearny to be registered as a national historic landmark. Fort Kearny was designated as a national historic landmark on December 19, 1960. On July 14, 1953, he introduced legislation to abolish the Shoshone Cavern National Monument and offer the land to Cody, Wyoming, for use as a public park. On March 17, 1954, Congress voted to delist the site as a national monument and the land was transferred to Cody on May 17. In 1963, Harrison supported the registration of Wapiti Ranger Station in the Shoshone National Forest as a national historic landmark. In 1967, he introduced legislation to have Sheep Mountain Wilderness registered as a national monument.

Harrison criticized United Airlines for not having airline connections through Cheyenne, Wyoming, which would force Wyomingites to use local airline services to travel to connections in Denver, Omaha, or Salt Lake City, and pledged to have Cheyenne included on a coast-to-coast airline schedule. Harrison and Senators Joseph C. O'Mahoney and Lester C. Hunt wrote to Rawlins, Wyoming,'s Chamber of commerce giving support to plans to create a wool processing mill.

Harrison had $1,025,000 for construction at Francis E. Warren Air Force Base authorized in the 1951 federal budget. He supported reopening the Casper Army Air Base which had been deactivated on March 7, 1945. On April 4, 1951, Harrison and Senators Hunt and O'Mahoney met with Howard Sharp, Wyoming's Secretary-manager of commerce and industry commission, to discuss increasing the amount of national defense contracts given to Wyoming.

==== Native Americans ====
On November 21, 1950, Harrison met with representatives of the Arapaho and Eastern Shoshone tribal business councils, who were seeking help in extending a bill giving semi-annual payments from the federal government, which was set to expire in March 1952. In September 1951 and January 1953, he introduced legislation to increase the per capita payments to the Arapaho and Shoshone tribes living in the Wind River Indian Reservation.

In 1953, Harrison introduced House concurrent resolution 108, which would release all Native Americans from the administration of the Bureau of Indian Affairs. The bureau would withdraw from California, Florida, New York, Iowa, and Texas. The Flathead, Klamath, Menominee, Osage, Potawatomi, and Chippewa tribes would be released from federal supervision. Native Americans would be made subject to the same laws as other Americans and would be given full American citizenship. In July, the Interior and Insular House committee approved the bill. On August 1, the resolution was passed.

On May 9, 1968, Harrison introduced a resolution asking for President Lyndon Johnson to declare June 30, as that would have been the 100th anniversary of the Wind River Indian Reservation, as National Original Americans Day.

=== Foreign ===
==== Cuba ====
Harrison stated that the Soviet Union would not be convinced of their support of West Berlin during the Berlin Crisis unless the United States was more strict to Fidel Castro's Cuba and that foreign aid should only be sent to countries that support the United States and Western Europe against communism.

He supported having the United States recognize the Cuban government-in-exile instead of Fidel Castro. Harrison called for the Monroe Doctrine to be applied against Cuba and the Soviet Union through an embargo to prevent the shipping of technicians and military material to Cuba.

After attending a closed door security meeting regarding the Cuban Missile Crisis in San Francisco, Harrison attended a Republican rally where he called for either the United Nations or United States to destroy the Cuban missile sites.

==== Korea ====
Harrison criticized the lack of preparedness of the United States army going into the Korean War. He supported General Douglas MacArthur's letter to the Veterans of Foreign Wars national convention in which he stated that the island of Taiwan should be defended at any cost due to its strategic importance as an "unsinkable aircraft carrier and submarine tender". He criticized Truman's dismissal of MacArthur stating that "MacArthur's command in Japan is vital to the United States and all of the free world".

Harrison disagreed with the British criticism of the United States' bombing of the Sui-ho Dam on the Yalu River, as he felt that it was necessary to bring a successful and quick end to the war.

On February 12, 1968, he criticized the response to the capture of the USS Pueblo. Harrison stated that a military response to the capture should have occurred immediately following its capture and not on a later date. He also stated that the United States could not be hasty in its response as it would not be able to fight both the Vietnam War and a war with North Korea.

==== Soviet Union and Eastern Bloc ====
Harrison stated that the leaders of the United States during World War II had surrendered to Joseph Stalin at the Quebec, Tehran, Yalta, and Potsdam conferences. On February 15, 1951, he was one of over one hundred Republican members of Congress that signed a declaration demanding Congressional participation in foreign policy.

Harrison supported the release of William N. Oatis, a journalist who was charged with espionage by the Czechoslovak Socialist Republic and sentenced to ten years in prison.

In 1961, Harrison supported President Kennedy during the Berlin Crisis and stated that he deserved the full support of Americans due to his stand to protect West Berlin. He opposed the Partial Nuclear Test Ban Treaty as communist countries had broken multiple treaties before.

On October 7, 1963, Harrison criticized the sale of wheat to the Soviet Union as a "massive retreat in the fight against communism" as it would solve their agricultural shortages and allow for increased spending in the Soviet military. However, Harrison was absent when the House of Representatives voted 189 to 158 in favor of giving the final decision on the wheat exports to President Lyndon B. Johnson on December 24.

==== Vietnam ====
In 1966, Harrison gave support to bombing the North Vietnamese port of Haiphong while debating Mayne Miller at the University of Wyoming. He also stated that the allies of the United States should stop trading with the North Vietnamese.

== Electoral history ==
William Henry Harrison III electoral history

1950 Wyoming at-large congressional District Republican primary
Party	Candidate	Votes	%
Republican	William Henry Harrison III	14,859	43.00%
Republican	Homer Oxley	11,438	33.10%
Republican	T. C. Thompson	8,262	23.91%
Total votes		34,559	100.00%

1950 Wyoming at-large congressional District election
Party	Candidate	Votes	%	±%
Republican	William Henry Harrison III	50,865	54.49%	+2.97%
Democratic	John B. Clark	42,483	45.51%	−2.97%
Total votes		93,348	100.00%	

1952 Wyoming at-large congressional District election
Party	Candidate	Votes	%	±%
Republican	William Henry Harrison III (incumbent)	76,161	60.10%	+5.61%
Democratic	Robert R. Rose Jr.	50,559	39.90%	−5.61%
Total votes		126,720	100.00%	

1954 Wyoming Senate special Republican primary
Party	Candidate	Votes	%
Republican	William Henry Harrison III	22,257	49.98%
Republican	Sam C. Hyatt	10,832	24.33%
Republican	Ewing T. Kerr	10,601	23.81%
Republican	W. J. Taber	841	1.89%
Total votes		44,531	100.00%

1954 Wyoming Senate Republican primary
Party	Candidate	Votes	%
Republican	William Henry Harrison III	23,119	51.55%
Republican	Sam C. Hyatt	10,643	23.73%
Republican	Ewing T. Kerr	10,374	23.13%
Republican	W. J. Taber	709	1.58%
Total votes		44,845	100.00%

1954 Wyoming Senate special election
Party	Candidate	Votes	%	±%
Democratic	Joseph C. O'Mahoney	57,163	51.56%	−5.55%
Republican	William Henry Harrison III	53,705	48.44%	+5.55%
Total votes		110,868	100.00%	

1954 Wyoming Senate election
Party	Candidate	Votes	%	±%
Democratic	Joseph C. O'Mahoney (incumbent)	57,845	51.53%	−0.03%
Republican	William Henry Harrison III	53,705	48.47%	+0.03%
Total votes		112,252	100.00%	

1960 Wyoming at-Large congressional district Republican primary
Party	Candidate	Votes	%
Republican	William Henry Harrison III	12,896	28.53%
Republican	Kenneth L. Sailors	10,838	23.98%
Republican	Mark Cox	7,476	16.54%
Republican	Walter Kingham	7,272	16.09%
Republican	R. L. Greene	6,718	14.86%
Total votes		45,200	100.00%

1960 Wyoming at-Large congressional district election
Party	Candidate	Votes	%
Republican	William Henry Harrison III	70,241	52.29%
Democratic	Hepburn T. Armstrong	64,090	47.71%
Total votes		134,331	100.00%

1962 Wyoming at-large congressional district Republican primary
Party	Candidate	Votes	%
Republican	William Henry Harrison III (incumbent)	31,443	62.44%
Republican	Gerry L. Spence	18,911	37.56%
Total votes		50,354	100.00%

1962 Wyoming at-large congressional District election
Party	Candidate	Votes	%	±%
Republican	William Henry Harrison III (incumbent)	71,489	61.38%	+9.09%
Democratic	Louis A. Mankus	44,985	38.62%	−9.09%
Total votes		116,474	100.00%	

1964 Wyoming at-large congressional District election
Party	Candidate	Votes	%	±%
Democratic	Teno Roncalio	70,693	50.79%	+12.17%
Republican	William Henry Harrison III (incumbent)	68,482	49.21%	−12.17%
Total votes		139,175	100.00%	

1966 Wyoming at-large congressional district Republican primary
Party	Candidate	Votes	%
Republican	William Henry Harrison III	24,286	51.17%
Republican	Roy Peck	23,180	48.84%
Total votes		47,466	100.00%

1966 Wyoming at-large congressional District election
Party	Candidate	Votes	%	±%
Republican	William Henry Harrison III	62,984	52.30%	+3.09%
Democratic	Al Christian	57,442	47.70%	−3.09%
Total votes		120,426	100.00%	

1968 Wyoming at-large congressional district Republican primary
Party	Candidate	Votes	%
Republican	John S. Wold	23,590	49.21%
Republican	William Henry Harrison III (incumbent)	22,522	46.99%
Republican	Carl A. Johnson	696	1.45%
Republican	I. Wayne Kinney	673	1.40%
Republican	Richard M. Oie	453	0.95%
Total votes		47,934	100.00%

U.S. House of Representatives
Preceded by Frank A. Barrett	Member of the U.S. House of Representatives from Wyoming's at-large congressional district January 3, 1951 – January 3, 1955	Succeeded by Edwin Keith Thomson
Preceded by Edwin Keith Thomson	Member of the U.S. House of Representatives from Wyoming's at-large congressional district January 3, 1961 – January 3, 1965	Succeeded by Teno Roncalio
Preceded by Teno Roncalio	Member of the U.S. House of Representatives from Wyoming's at-large congressional district January 3, 1967 – January 3, 1969	Succeeded by John S. Wold
Party political offices
Preceded by Edward V. Robertson	Republican nominee for U.S. Senator from Wyoming (Class 2); 1954 (special), 1954	Succeeded by Edwin Keith Thomson
