= 1950 Wyoming state elections =

A general election was held in the U.S. state of Wyoming on Tuesday, November 7, 1950. All of the state's executive officers—the governor, secretary of state, auditor, treasurer, and superintendent of public instruction—were up for election. The Republican Party swept all of the offices. Following Democratic governor Lester C. Hunt's election to the U.S. Senate in 1948, Republican secretary of state Arthur G. Crane had been acting as governor. Republican Congressman Frank A. Barrett was elected governor, and Republican candidates won the other statewide races.

== Governor ==
Following Governor Lester C. Hunt's election to the U.S. Senate in 1948, Republican secretary of state Arthur G. Crane had been acting as governor. Crane declined to seek re-election, and Congressman Frank A. Barrett, the Republican nominee, defeated his congressional predecessor, John J. McIntyre, the Democratic nominee, for the Republican Party's first gubernatorial victory since 1938.

1950 Wyoming gubernatorial election
Party	Candidate	Votes	%	±%
Republican	Frank A. Barrett	54,441	56.15%	+9.03%
Democratic	John J. McIntyre	42,518	43.85%	−9.03%
Majority		11,923	12.30%	+6.54%
Turnout		96,959		
Republican hold				

== Secretary of state ==
Incumbent Republican secretary of state Arthur G. Crane had acted as governor starting in 1949, when Governor Hunt was sworn into the U.S. Senate. Crane declined to run for re-election in 1950. Accordingly, term-limited Republican state treasurer Doc Rogers ran to succeed him. He defeated State Senator Richard Luman in the Republican primary, and then faced Cheyenne mayor Ben Nelson, the Democratic nominee, in the general election. Despite the strong Republican performance across the state, Rogers only narrowly defeated Nelson. Ironically, just as Crane had acted as governor when Hunt was elected to the Senate, Governor Barrett would similarly be elected to the Senate in 1952, elevating Rogers to the governorship.

=== Democratic primary ===
==== Candidates ====
- Ben Nelson, Mayor of Cheyenne

==== Results ====
Democratic Party primary results
Party	Candidate	Votes	%
Democratic	Ben Nelson	24,070	100.00%
Total votes		24,070	100.00%

=== Republican primary ===
==== Candidates ====
- Doc Rogers, Wyoming State Treasurer
- Richard J. "Dick" Luman, former state senator

==== Results ====
Republican Primary results
Party	Candidate	Votes	%
Republican	Doc Rogers	23,438	66.98%
Republican	Richard J. "Dick" Nelson	11,555	33.02%
Total votes		35,030	100.00%

=== General election ===
==== Results ====
1950 Wyoming Secretary of State election
Party	Candidate	Votes	%	±%
Republican	Doc Rogers	48,882	51.98%	−6.50%
Democratic	Ben Nelson	45,159	48.02%	+6.50%
Majority		3,723	3.96%	−13.00%
Turnout		94,041		
Republican hold				

== Auditor ==
Incumbent Republican state auditor Everett T. Copenhaver ran for re-election to a second term. He was challenged in the Republican primary by Sam Morgan, a state bank examiner, whom he handily defeated. Democrats did not seriously recruit a candidate to challenge Copenhaver, and political newcomer Robert Holland emerged as the nominee over attorney Leonard Schlather. Copenhaver easily defeated Holland, winning the largest margin of victory of any statewide candidate that year.

=== Democratic primary ===
==== Candidates ====
- Robert W. Holland, political newcomer
- Leonard H. "Judge" Schlather, attorney, 1948 Democratic candidate for the State House

==== Results ====
Democratic Party primary results
Party	Candidate	Votes	%
Democratic	Robert W. Holland	16,538	68.83%
Democratic	Leonard H. "Judge" Schlather	7,490	31.17%
Total votes		24,028	100.00%

=== Republican primary ===
==== Candidates ====
- Everett T. Copenhaver, incumbent state auditor
- Sam B. Morgan, senior bank examiner in State Examiner's office

==== Results ====
Republican Primary results
Party	Candidate	Votes	%
Republican	Everett T. Copenhaver (inc.)	23,624	67.44%
Republican	Sam B. Morgan	11,406	32.56%
Total votes		35,030	100.00%

=== General election ===
==== Results ====
1950 Wyoming Auditor election
Party	Candidate	Votes	%	±%
Republican	Everett T. Copenhaver (inc.)	55,383	59.99%	+4.39%
Democratic	Robert W. Holland	36,934	40.01%	−4.39%
Majority		18,449	19.98%	+8.79%
Turnout		92,317		
Republican hold				

== Treasurer ==
Incumbent Republican state treasurer Doc Rogers, unable to seek re-election, instead ran for secretary of state. A competitive Republican primary formed to replace him. State Representative J. Roy Mitchell ran against State Senate President George Burke and former state representative Paul Groesbeck. Like the 1946 primary, the final result was close, with Mitchell beating Burke by fewer than 500 votes. In the general election, Mitchell faced State Representative Raymond B. Morris. Mitchell decisively defeated Morris, winning 56% of the vote to Morris's 44%. However, a little more than a year into his term, Morris died from a heart attack and his wife, Minnie Mitchell, was appointed as his replacement by Governor Barrett. She subsequently won a special election in 1952 for the balance of her husband's term.

=== Democratic primary ===
==== Candidates ====
- Raymond B. Morris, state representative from Laramie County, 1942 Democratic candidate for secretary of state

==== Results ====
Democratic Party primary results
Party	Candidate	Votes	%
Democratic	Raymond B. Morris	23,055	100.00%
Total votes		23,055	100.00%

=== Republican primary ===
==== Candidates ====
- J. Roy Mitchell, state representative from Natrona County
- George Burke, president of the Wyoming Senate
- Paul W. Groesbeck, former state representative from Laramie County

==== Results ====
Republican Primary results
Party	Candidate	Votes	%
Republican	J. Roy Mitchell	13,743	41.83%
Republican	George Burke	13,270	40.39%
Republican	Paul W. Groesbeck	5,840	17.78%
Total votes		32,853	100.00%

=== General election ===
==== Results ====
1950 Wyoming Treasurer election
Party	Candidate	Votes	%	±%
Republican	J. Roy Mitchell	51,198	56.33%	−1.16%
Democratic	Raymond B. Morris	39,685	43.67%	+1.16%
Majority		11,513	12.67%	−2.32%
Turnout		90,883		
Republican hold				

== Superintendent of public instruction ==
Incumbent Republican superintendent of public instruction Edna B. Stolt ran for re-election to a second term. She faced challenges in the Republican primary from Verda James, who had served under Stolt as deputy superintendent, and from Henry L. Rebbe, Jr., who served as superintendent of schools for the town of Glenrock. Though Stolt won renomination, she was unable to win a majority of the vote, winning just 49.5% of the vote to James's 35% and Rebbe's 15.5%. In the general election, she faced the Democratic nominee, Glenn K. Rogers, a high school teacher in Cheyenne. Despite her weak performance in the Republican primary, Stolt overwhelmingly defeated Rogers in the general election, improving on her performance from 1946.

=== Democratic primary ===
==== Candidates ====
- Glenn K. Rogers, Cheyenne high school teacher

==== Results ====
Democratic Party primary results
Party	Candidate	Votes	%
Democratic	Glenn K. Rogers	23,445	100.00%
Total votes		23,445	100.00%

=== Republican primary ===
==== Candidates ====
- Edna B. Stolt, incumbent superintendent of public instruction
- Verda James, former deputy superintendent of public instruction
- Henry L. Rebbe, Jr., former Glenrock superintendent of schools

==== Results ====
Republican Party primary results
Party	Candidate	Votes	%
Republican	Edna B. Stolt (inc.)	17,568	49.52%
Republican	Verda S. James	12,428	35.03%
Republican	Henry L. Rebbe, Jr.	5,479	15.44%
Total votes		35,475	100.00%

=== General election ===
==== Results ====
1950 Wyoming Superintendent of Public Instruction election
Party	Candidate	Votes	%	±%
Republican	Edna B. Stolt (inc.)	53,265	57.22%	+5.57%
Democratic	Glenn K. Rogers	39,816	42.78%	−5.57%
Majority		13,449	14.45%	+11.13%
Turnout		93,081		
Republican hold				
