= 1954 Wyoming state elections =

A general election was held in the U.S. state of Wyoming on Tuesday, November 2, 1954. All of the state's executive officers—the governor, secretary of state, auditor, treasurer, and superintendent of public instruction—were up for election. The result was largely a continuation of Republican rule, though Democrat Velma Linford won the election for Superintendent and the margins in most of the other races shrank considerably from 1950.

== Governor ==
Following Governor Frank A. Barrett's election to the U.S. Senate in 1952, Republican secretary of state Doc Rogers became acting governor. He ran for re-election, but was defeated by former state representative Milward Simpson in the Republican primary. In the general election, Simpson then narrowly defeated William M. Jack, the former secretary of state and state auditor.

1954 Wyoming gubernatorial election
Party	Candidate	Votes	%	±%
Republican	Milward Simpson	56,275	50.50%	−5.65%
Democratic	William M. Jack	55,163	49.50%	+5.65%
Majority		1,112	1.00%	−11.30%
Turnout		111,438	100.00%	
Republican hold				

== Secretary of state ==
Incumbent Republican secretary of state Doc Rogers simultaneously served as acting Governor following Governor Frank A. Barrett's election to the U.S. Senate in 1952, and opted to run for re-election as Governor rather than for re-election as secretary of state. State Auditor Everett T. Copenhaver ran for secretary of state, and won the Republican primary unopposed. In the general election, he faced Zan Lewis, a former aide to Senator Lester C. Hunt and the longtime chief clerk in the secretary of state's office. Copenhaver was able to build on his record of electoral victories and defeated Lewis in a landslide, and was the strongest performing statewide candidate that year.

=== Democratic primary ===
==== Candidates ====
- Zan Lewis, former legislative aide to U.S. Senator Lester C. Hunt, chief clerk in the secretary of state's office
- Archie Ewoldsen, Secretary of the Sheridan Chamber of Commerce, former Public Service Commissioner

==== Results ====
Democratic Party primary results
Party	Candidate	Votes	%
Democratic	Zan Lewis	17,845	61.22%
Democratic	Archie Ewoldsen	11,306	38.78%
Total votes		29,151	100.00%

=== Republican primary ===
==== Candidates ====
- Everett T. Copenhaver, Wyoming State Auditor

==== Results ====
Republican Primary results
Party	Candidate	Votes	%
Republican	Everett T. Copenhaver	39,766	100.00%
Total votes		39,766	100.00%

=== General election ===
==== Results ====
1954 Wyoming Secretary of State election
Party	Candidate	Votes	%	±%
Republican	Everett T. Copenhaver	61,130	57.05%	+5.07%
Democratic	Zan Lewis	46,018	42.95%	−5.07%
Majority		15,112	14.10%	+10.14%
Turnout		107,148		
Republican hold				

== Auditor ==
Incumbent Republican state auditor Everett T. Copenhaver opted against seeking a third term, instead running for secretary of state. Accordingly, State Treasurer Minnie A. Mitchell, barred from seeking a second term as treasurer, ran for auditor. She defeated Rusty Rothwell, secretary to the State Board of Charities and Reform, in the Republican primary and then faced Democratic nominee Bob Adams, a real estate broker, in the general election.

=== Democratic primary ===
==== Candidates ====
- Bob Adams, Cheyenne real estate broker
- Adam Roney, former Mayor of Powell

==== Results ====
Democratic Party primary results
Party	Candidate	Votes	%
Democratic	Bob Adams	20,601	67.29%
Democratic	Adam Roney	10,015	32.71%
Total votes		30,616	100.00%

=== Republican primary ===
==== Candidates ====
- Minnie A. Mitchell, Wyoming State Treasurer
- E. C. "Rusty" Rothwell, secretary to the State Board of Charities and Reform

==== Results ====
Republican Primary results
Party	Candidate	Votes	%
Republican	Minnie A. Mitchell	28,917	69.34%
Republican	E. C. "Rusty" Rothwell	12,784	30.66%
Total votes		41,701	100.00%

=== General election ===
==== Results ====
1954 Wyoming Auditor election
Party	Candidate	Votes	%	±%
Republican	Minnie A. Mitchell	57,912	53.39%	−6.61%
Democratic	Bob Adams	50,566	46.61%	+6.61%
Majority		7,346	6.77%	−13.21%
Turnout		92,317		
Republican hold				

== Treasurer ==
Incumbent Republican state treasurer Minnie A. Mitchell, appointed to the post following the death of her husband in 1952, was barred from seeking re-election due to term limits. Charles B. Morgan, who served as deputy state treasurer for 41 years and to 12 different state treasurers, won the Republican primary over Insurance Commissioner Ford S. Taft. In the general election, he faced former state representative W. D. "Jud" Witherspoon, the Democratic nominee, whom he narrowly defeated.

=== Democratic primary ===
==== Candidates ====
- W. D. "Jud" Witherspoon, former state representative from Lincoln County

==== Results ====
Democratic Party primary results
Party	Candidate	Votes	%
Democratic	W. D. "Jud" Witherspoon	28,156	100.00%
Total votes		28,156	100.00%

=== Republican primary ===
==== Candidates ====
- Charles B. Morgan, deputy state treasurer
- Ford S. Taft, state insurance commissioner

==== Results ====
Republican Primary results
Party	Candidate	Votes	%
Republican	Charles B. Morgan	23,549	58.40%
Republican	Ford S. Taft	16,772	41.60%
Total votes		40,321	100.00%

=== General election ===
==== Results ====
1954 Wyoming Treasurer election
Party	Candidate	Votes	%	±%
Republican	Charles B. Morgan	56,592	53.41%	−5.27%
Democratic	W. D. "Jud" Witherspoon	49,357	46.59%	+1.16%
Majority		7,235	6.83%	−2.32%
Turnout		105,949	100.00%	
Republican hold				

== Superintendent of public instruction ==
Incumbent Republican superintendent of public instruction Edna B. Stolt declined to run for re-election to a third term. State Education Commissioner Ray Robertson won the Republican nomination to succeed Stolt unopposed and faced Velma Linford, the 1946 nominee for superintendent. In the Democratic Party's only pickup of a state executive office, Linford narrowly defeated Robertson to win her first term.

=== Democratic primary ===
==== Candidates ====
- Velma Linford, Laramie High School teacher, 1946 Democratic nominee for Superintendent

==== Results ====
Democratic Party primary results
Party	Candidate	Votes	%
Democratic	Velma Linford	28,226	100.00%
Total votes		28,226	100.00%

=== Republican primary ===
==== Candidates ====
- Ray E. Robertson, State Education Commissioner

==== Results ====
Republican Party primary results
Party	Candidate	Votes	%
Republican	Ray E. Robertson	38,071	100.00%
Total votes		38,071	100.00%

=== General election ===
==== Results ====
1954 Wyoming Superintendent of Public Instruction election
Party	Candidate	Votes	%	±%
Democratic	Velma Linford	54,438	50.88%	+8.10%
Republican	Ray E. Robertson	52,558	49.12%	−8.10%
Majority		1,880	1.76%	−12.69%
Turnout		106,996	100.00%	
Democratic gain from Republican				
