= 1946 Wyoming state elections =

A general election was held in the U.S. state of Wyoming on Tuesday, November 5, 1946. All of the state's executive officers—the governor, secretary of state, auditor, treasurer, and superintendent of public instruction—were up for election. The election was largely a rout for the Republican Party. Though Democratic governor Lester C. Hunt was narrowly re-elected, Democrats lost their two other state offices: auditor and secretary of state (which they picked up following a vacancy). Moreover, they were unable to win back any other state offices.

== Governor ==
Incumbent Democratic governor Lester C. Hunt ran for re-election to a second term. Though his predecessor, former governor Nels H. Smith, planned a rematch against Hunt, he lost the Republican primary to State Treasurer Earl Wright. In the general election, Hunt defeated Wright by a narrow margin, but improved from his 1942 election. During Hunt's second term, he would be elected to the U.S. Senate in 1948, vacating his office. Secretary of State Arthur G. Crane ascended to the governorship, while still acting as secretary of state.

1946 Wyoming gubernatorial election
Party	Candidate	Votes	%	±%
Democratic	Lester C. Hunt (inc.)	43,020	52.88%	+1.56%
Republican	Earl Wright	38,333	47.12%	−1.56%
Majority		4,687	5.76%	+3.13%
Turnout		81,353	100.00%	
Democratic hold				

== Secretary of State ==
In 1944, Republican secretary of state Mart Christensen died while in office. Governor Hunt appointed longtime State Auditor William M. Jack as Christensen's replacement. Jack declined to run for re-election or for any other office, creating an open seat. Earl R. Burns, the Chairman of the Wyoming Public Service Commission, won the Democratic nomination unopposed and advanced to the general election against Arthur G. Crane, the former President of the University of Wyoming. The general election was not close, and Crane was elected secretary of state over Burns by a landslide. During Crane's term, Governor Hunt would be elected to the U.S. Senate, and Crane would serve as both acting governor and secretary of state.

=== Democratic primary ===
==== Candidates ====
- Earl R. Burns, chairman of the Wyoming Public Service Commission

==== Results ====
Democratic Party primary results
Party	Candidate	Votes	%
Democratic	Earl R. Burns	15,272	100.00%
Total votes		15,272	100.00%

=== Republican primary ===
==== Candidates ====
- Arthur G. Crane, former President of the University of Wyoming
- Thomas A. Nicholas, former Campbell County and Crook County Prosecuting Attorney, 1938 Republican candidate for Governor

==== Results ====
Republican Primary results
Party	Candidate	Votes	%
Republican	Arthur G. Crane	14,964	59.09%
Republican	Thomas A. Nicholas	10,365	40.92%
Total votes		25,329	100.00%

=== General election ===
==== Results ====
1946 Wyoming Secretary of State election
Party	Candidate	Votes	%	±%
Republican	Arthur G. Crane	45,502	58.48%	−0.38%
Democratic	Earl R. Burns	32,304	41.52%	+0.38%
Majority		13,198	16.96%	−0.76%
Turnout		77,806		
Republican gain from Democratic				

== Auditor ==
Following the death of Secretary of State Mart T. Christensen, Democratic state auditor William M. Jack was appointed as his replacement by governor, who, in turn, appointed Carl Robinson as Jack's successor. In 1945, Robinson resigned from office and Governor Hunt appointed former Congressman John J. McIntyre as his replacement. McIntyre opted to run for Congress rather than seek re-election, and no other Democratic candidates filed for the election. In early July, however, Major Alvin C. Wade of the United States Army announced a write-in campaign, and won enough votes to receive the Democratic nomination. In the general election, Copenhaver defeated Wade by a decisive margin.

=== Democratic primary ===
No Democratic candidates filed to run for auditor. However, on July 8, Major Alvin C. Wade of the U.S. Army announced that he would run as a write-in candidate for the party's nomination. He accepted the nomination upon receiving the requisite number of write-in votes.

=== Republican primary ===
==== Candidates ====
- Everett T. Copenhaver, assistant state examiner, former deputy secretary of state, former state representative from Converse County, 1942 Republican nominee for auditor

==== Results ====
Republican Primary results
Party	Candidate	Votes	%
Republican	Everett T. Copenhaver	22,133	100.00%
Total votes		22,133	100.00%

=== General election ===
==== Results ====
1946 Wyoming Auditor election
Party	Candidate	Votes	%	±%
Republican	Everett T. Copenhaver	42,819	55.60%	+10.39%
Democratic	Alvin C. Wade	34,196	44.40%	−10.39%
Majority		8,623	11.20%	+1.61%
Turnout		77,015		
Republican gain from Democratic				

== Treasurer ==
Incumbent Republican state treasurer Earl Wright, unable to seek re-election, instead opted to run for Governor. Doc Rogers, who had unsuccessfully run for Auditor in 1938 and Treasurer in 1942, ran against State Senator Thomas Stirling and former state representative Carl Dallam in a close Republican primary. Rogers was narrowly leading Stirling as votes were tallied on election night, with the final tally putting him ahead of Stirling by 99 votes. However, alleged irregularities with how the primary was conducted in Natrona County were raised, namely that "candidate names had not been properly placed on ballots and that ballots had been opened before being placed in ballot boxes." However, the secretary of state's office concluded that it was without jurisdiction to evaluate the allegations and certified Rogers's nomination.

In the general election, Rogers faced Democratic nominee David B. Gilfillan, the State Commissioner of Labor. Despite the closeness of the Republican primary and allegations of impropriety, the general election was not close, and Rogers defeated Gilfillan in a landslide.

=== Democratic primary ===
==== Candidates ====
- David B. Gilfillan

==== Results ====
Democratic Party primary results
Party	Candidate	Votes	%
Democratic	David B. Gilfillan	14,163	100.00%
Total votes		14,163	100.00%

=== Republican primary ===
==== Candidates ====
- Doc Rogers, former Deputy Secretary of State, 1942 Republican candidate for treasurer, 1938 Republican nominee for Auditor
- Thomas Stirling, state senator from Weston County
- Carl A. Dallam, former state representative

==== Results ====
Republican Primary results
Party	Candidate	Votes	%
Republican	Doc Rogers	8,861	37.69%
Republican	Thomas Stirling	8,762	37.27%
Republican	Carl A. Dallam	5,885	25.03%
Total votes		23,508	100.00%

=== General election ===
==== Results ====
1946 Wyoming Treasurer election
Party	Candidate	Votes	%	±%
Republican	Doc Rogers	43,903	57.49%	−1.73%
Democratic	David B. Gilfillan	32,459	42.51%	+1.73%
Majority		11,444	14.99%	−3.47%
Turnout		76,362		
Republican hold				

== Superintendent of public instruction ==
Incumbent Republican superintendent of public instruction Esther Anderson declined to run for a third term, instead endorsing Edna B. Stolt, the Supervisor of Elementary and Special Education the State Department of Education, as her successor. Stolt faced high school teacher Nancy L. Jones and former governor Alonzo M. Clark in the Republican primary, whom she narrowly defeated to advance to the general election. Velma Linford, a high school teacher, won the Democratic primary unopposed and opposed Stolt in the general election. Despite the broad support for Republican candidates around the state, the race between Stolt and Linford was close, with Stolt only beating her opponent by 2,545 votes.

=== Democratic primary ===
==== Candidates ====
- Velma Linford, Laramie High School teacher

==== Results ====
Democratic Party primary results
Party	Candidate	Votes	%
Democratic	Velma Linford	14,168	100.00%
Total votes		14,168	100.00%

=== Republican primary ===
==== Candidates ====
- Edna B. Stolt, Wyoming Department of Education supervisor of elementary and special education
- Nancy L. Jones, Laramie High School teacher
- Alonzo M. Clark, former governor of Wyoming

==== Results ====
Republican Party primary results
Party	Candidate	Votes	%
Republican	Edna B. Stolt	8,837	37.29%
Republican	Nancy L. Jones	8,134	34.33%
Republican	Alonzo M. Clark	6,725	28.38%
Total votes		23,696	100.00%

=== General election ===
==== Results ====
1946 Wyoming Superintendent of Public Instruction election
Party	Candidate	Votes	%	±%
Republican	Edna B. Stolt	39,638	51.66%	−9.17%
Democratic	Velma Linford	37,093	48.34%	+9.17%
Majority		2,545	3.32%	−18.34%
Turnout		76,731		
Republican hold				
