= Copenhaver =

Copenhaver may refer to:

== Places ==
- Copenhaver, West Virginia, USA; an unincorporated community in Kanawha County

== People with the surname Copenhaver ==
- Brian Copenhaver (born 1942), American academic
- Deborah Copenhaver Fellows (born 1948), American sculptor
- Deke Copenhaver, American politician; Mayor of Augusta–Richmond County, see List of mayors of Augusta, Georgia
- Eleanor Gladys Copenhaver (1896–1985), American activist
- Everett T. Copenhaver (1898–1986), American politician
- Helen Copenhaver Hanes (1917–2013), American painter
- Harold Copenhaver (born 1961), American politician
- John Thomas Copenhaver Jr. (1925–2026), American judge
- John Copenhaver (born 1974), American author
- Paul Copenhaver (1941–2014), American politician
- Rebecca Copenhaver (born 1971), American academic
- Ross D. Copenhaver (1924–1993), American politician

== See also ==
- Copenhagen (disambiguation)
- Haver
- Copen (disambiguation)
