= 1950 Wyoming gubernatorial election =

- November 7, 1950
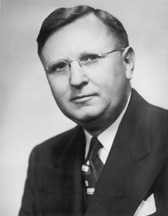

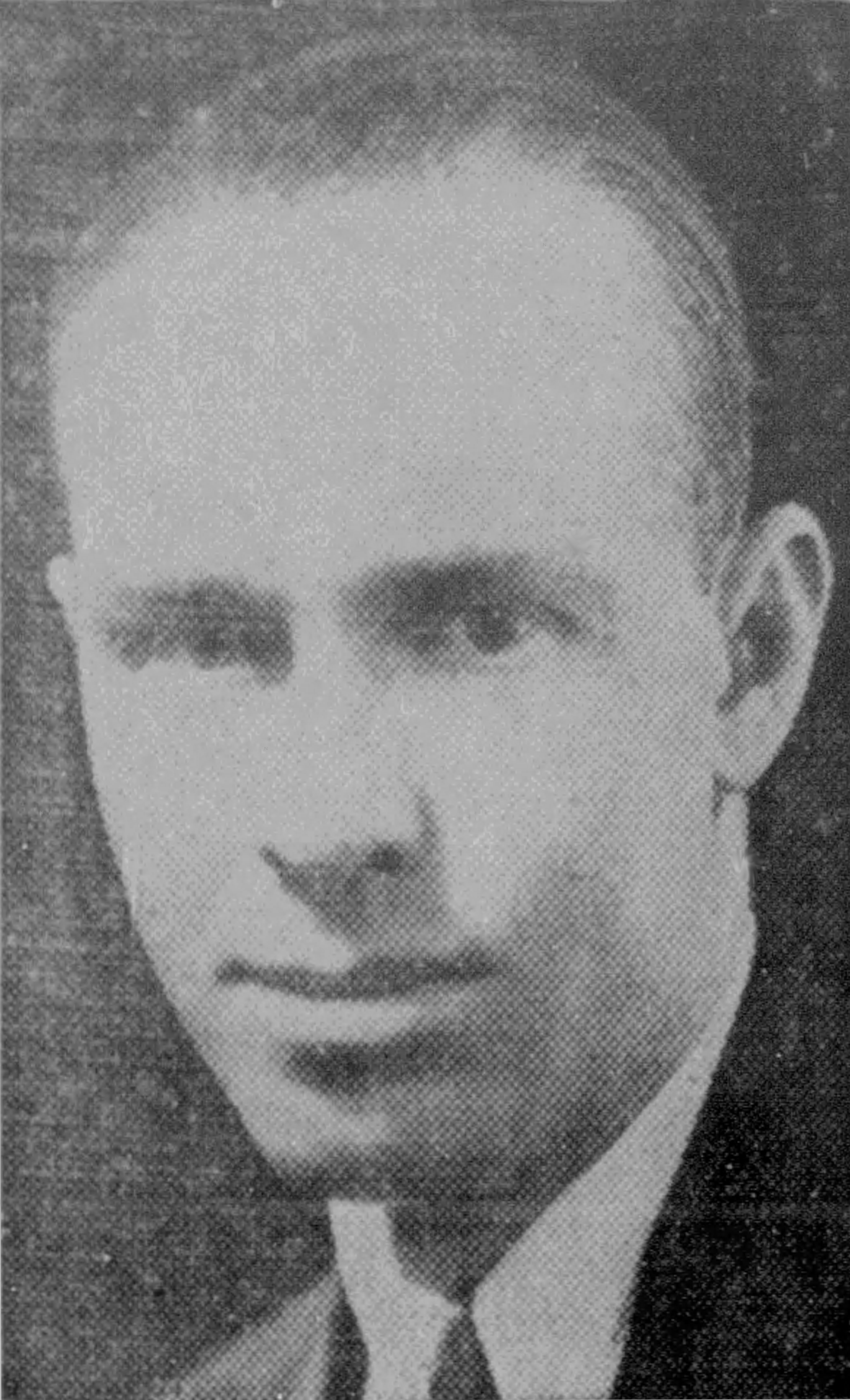
Nominee	Frank A. Barrett	John J. McIntyre
Party	Republican	Democratic
Popular vote	54,441	42,518
Percentage	56.15%	43.85%
- County results Barrett: 50–60% 60–70% 70–80% McIntyre: 50–60% 60–70%
Governor before election
Arthur G. Crane
Republican
Elected Governor
Frank A. Barrett
Republican

The 1950 Wyoming gubernatorial election took place on November 7, 1950. Incumbent Republican Governor Arthur G. Crane, who ascended to the governorship when Lester C. Hunt was elected to the Senate in 1948, declined to seek re-election. Congressman Frank A. Barrett won the Republican primary to succeed Crane and faced former State Auditor John J. McIntyre, the Democratic nominee, in the general election. Helped by the strong performance nationwide of the Republican Party, Barrett defeated McIntyre by a wide margin. This election was the first open-seat gubernatorial election in Wyoming since 1924.

== Democratic primary ==
=== Candidates ===
- John J. McIntyre, former Wyoming State Auditor, former U.S. Congressman from Wyoming's at-large congressional district
- Rudy Anselmi, State Senator from Sweetwater County
- Carl A. Johnson, accountant

=== Campaign ===
As the Democratic primary started, former Congressman and State Auditor John J. McIntyre entered as the frontrunner over State Senator Rudy Anselmi and accountant Carl A. Johnson. McIntyre announced that he would place the "welfare of our state ahead of partisan politics," specifically arguing that state regulatory agencies should be run by experts, "not under the control of partisan politics" and calling for "better highways" and "better secondary roads for our farmers and ranchers." Anselmi, a longtime state legislator, announced that he would run with a technocratic five-point platform, which included reappraising all state highways; expanding educational opportunities at the University of Wyoming; a top-to-bottom study of economies in the state government; the promotion of industrial development; and developing a centralized accounting system for state budgeting. He argued that "business principles can be applied to the operation of state government."

Though the primary was speculated to include many more names, including former Secretary of State William M. Jack and former Governor Leslie A. Miller, Miller declined to run, as did Jack.

As the campaign heated up, the primary issue in the race became reformation of the state's Game and Fish Commission. McIntyre had proposed reforms to the commission as he launched his campaign, and as the campaign continued, he announced that he would appoint commissioners who would make significant changes in how the body operated. Anselmi echoed McIntyre's views, pledging to appoint "the best men I could prevail upon to serve and I would not want 'yes men.'" He emphasized that he would work with them toward "the single purpose of bettering hunting and fishing in Wyoming." Both candidates launched a statewide tour of the state, but the race drew comparatively little attention.

Ultimately, McIntyre won the primary by a wide margin over Alsemi, racking up large margins in the northern part of the state. Anselmi won Sweetwater County, which he represented in the legislature, in a landslide, and also had narrow wins in neighboring Lincoln County and Sublette County, while holding McIntyre to narrower wins in much of vote-rich southeastern Wyoming.

=== Results ===
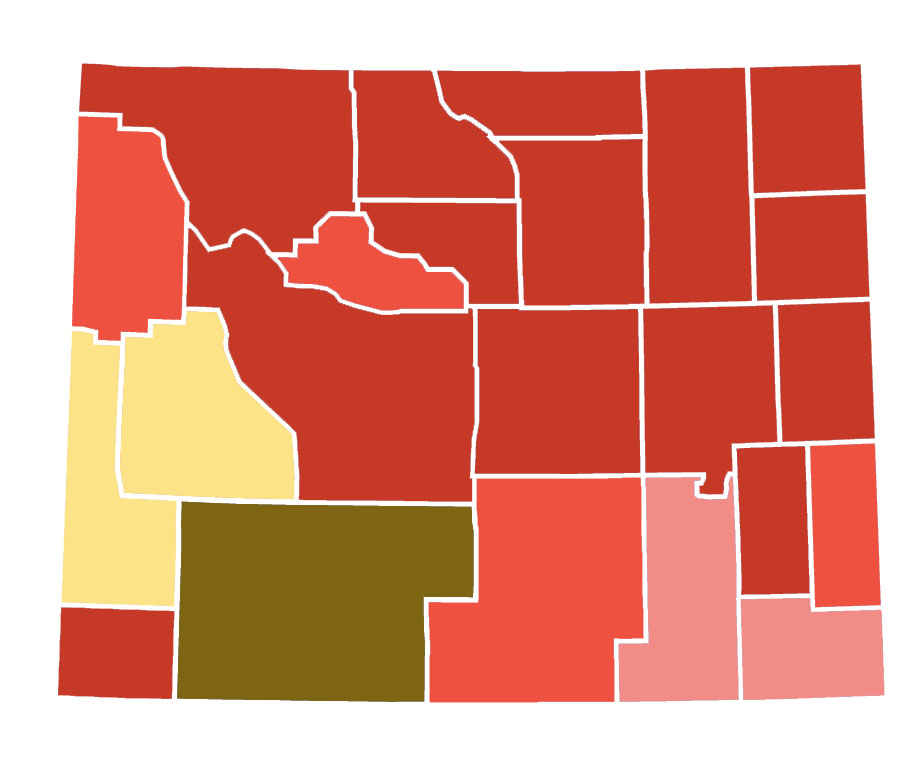
Results by county: McIntyre—60–70% McIntyre—50–60% McIntyre—40–50% Anselmi—70–80% Anselmi—40–50%

Democratic primary
Party	Candidate	Votes	%
Democratic	John J. McIntyre	14,578	51.75%
Democratic	Rudy Anselmi	10,366	36.80%
Democratic	Carl A. Johnson	3,224	11.45%
Total votes		28,168	100.00%

== Republican primary ==
=== Candidates ===
- Frank A. Barrett, U.S. Congressman from Wyoming's at-large congressional district
- C. D. Williamson, Chairman of the Wyoming Commerce and Industry Commission
- Leeland U. Grieve, State Senator from Carbon County
- Samuel L. Asher, wholesale grocer

=== Campaign ===
The Republican primary for Governor got off to an earlier start than the Democratic primary; two years prior to the 1950 election, on November 5, 1948, State Senator Leeland U. Grieve announced that he would run. The race remained dormant for more than a year, but in late 1949, Congressman Frank A. Barrett announced his candidacy. On February 1, 1950, C. D. Williamson, the Chairman of the Wyoming Commerce and Industry Commission and a former state legislator, announced that he would join Barrett in the primary. He cast himself as an outsider, noting in his announcement that he "make[s] no claim to professional political experience, but feel that my 40 years in the banking, insurance, timber and livestock business along with my active participation in public affairs in Wyoming justify the belief that I may merit support in this undertaking."

Even as the race got underway, the contest among Barrett, Williamson, and Grieve was largely quiet, with Barrett seen as the clear frontrunner. Barrett argued for belt-tightening in state government and announced that he would commission a "little Hoover commission" to investigate state finances. Grieve, meanwhile, condemned Republican leaders for ceding power to federal regulators and argued that the party needed "strong men in government."

In the end, Barrett defeated his opponents by a wide margin, winning 68% of the vote. Williamson placed second with 21% over Grieve, who managed to win only 8%. Williamson managed a sizable win in Carbon County, which he had previously represented in the legislature, and a narrow win in Park County. Barrett dominated the rest of the state, though he only won in southeast Wyoming by a thin margin.

=== Results ===
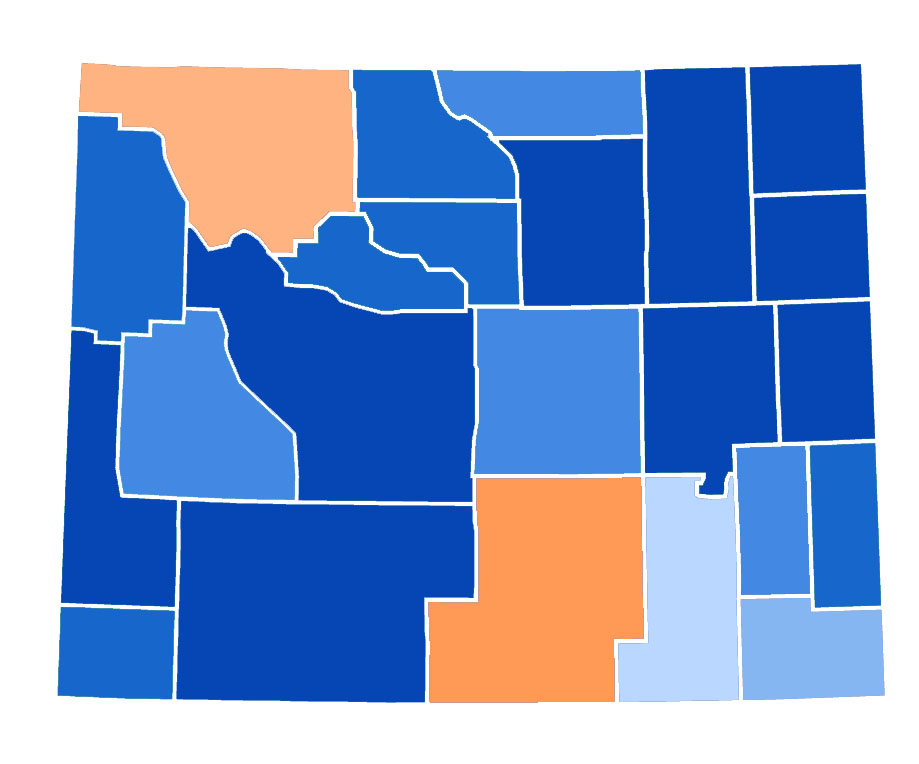
Results by county: Barrett—80–90% Barrett—70–80% Barrett—60–70% Barrett—50–60% Barrett—40–50% Williamson—50–60% Williamson—40–50%

Republican primary
Party	Candidate	Votes	%
Republican	Frank A. Barrett	25,581	67.78%
Republican	C. D. Williamson	7,944	21.05%
Republican	Leeland U. Grieve	3,136	8.31%
Republican	Samuel L. Asher	1,080	2.86%
Total votes		37,741	100.00%

== General election ==
=== Results ===
1950 Wyoming gubernatorial election
Party	Candidate	Votes	%	±%
Republican	Frank A. Barrett	54,441	56.15%	+9.03%
Democratic	John J. McIntyre	42,518	43.85%	−9.03%
Majority		11,923	12.30%	+6.54%
Turnout		96,959		
Republican hold				
