= Havern =

Havern is a surname. Notable people with the surname include:

- Dave Havern (fl. 1968–2017), American football player and coach
- Gianluca Havern (born 1988), English footballer
- Robert Havern III (1949–2014), American politician

== See also ==
- Haver
