= Everett T. Copenhaver =

American politician

Member of the Wyoming House of Representatives
- In office 1939–1941

11th and 13th Wyoming State Auditor
- In office 1947–1955
- Governor: Lester C. Hunt; Arthur G. Crane; Frank A. Barrett; Clifford Joy Rogers
- Preceded by: John J. McIntyre
- Succeeded by: Minnie A. Mitchell
- In office 1967–1973
- Governor: Stanley K. Hathaway
- Preceded by: Minnie A. Mitchell
- Succeeded by: Edwin J. Witzenburger

14th Secretary of State of Wyoming
- In office 1955–1959
- Governor: Milward Simpson
- Preceded by: Clifford Joy Rogers
- Succeeded by: Jack R. Gage

Treasurer of Wyoming
- In office 1963–1963
- Governor: Clifford Hansen

Personal details
- Born: April 22, 1898
- Died: April 3, 1986 (aged 87)
- Party: Republican
- Children: Ross D. Copenhaver

Everett T. Copenhaver (April 22, 1898 – April 3, 1986) was an American politician. He served as a Republican member of the Wyoming House of Representatives.
