= 1942 United States House of Representatives election in Wyoming =

1942 United States House of Representatives election in Wyoming, At-large district
- November 3, 1942
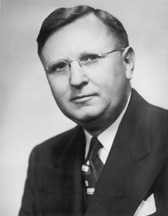

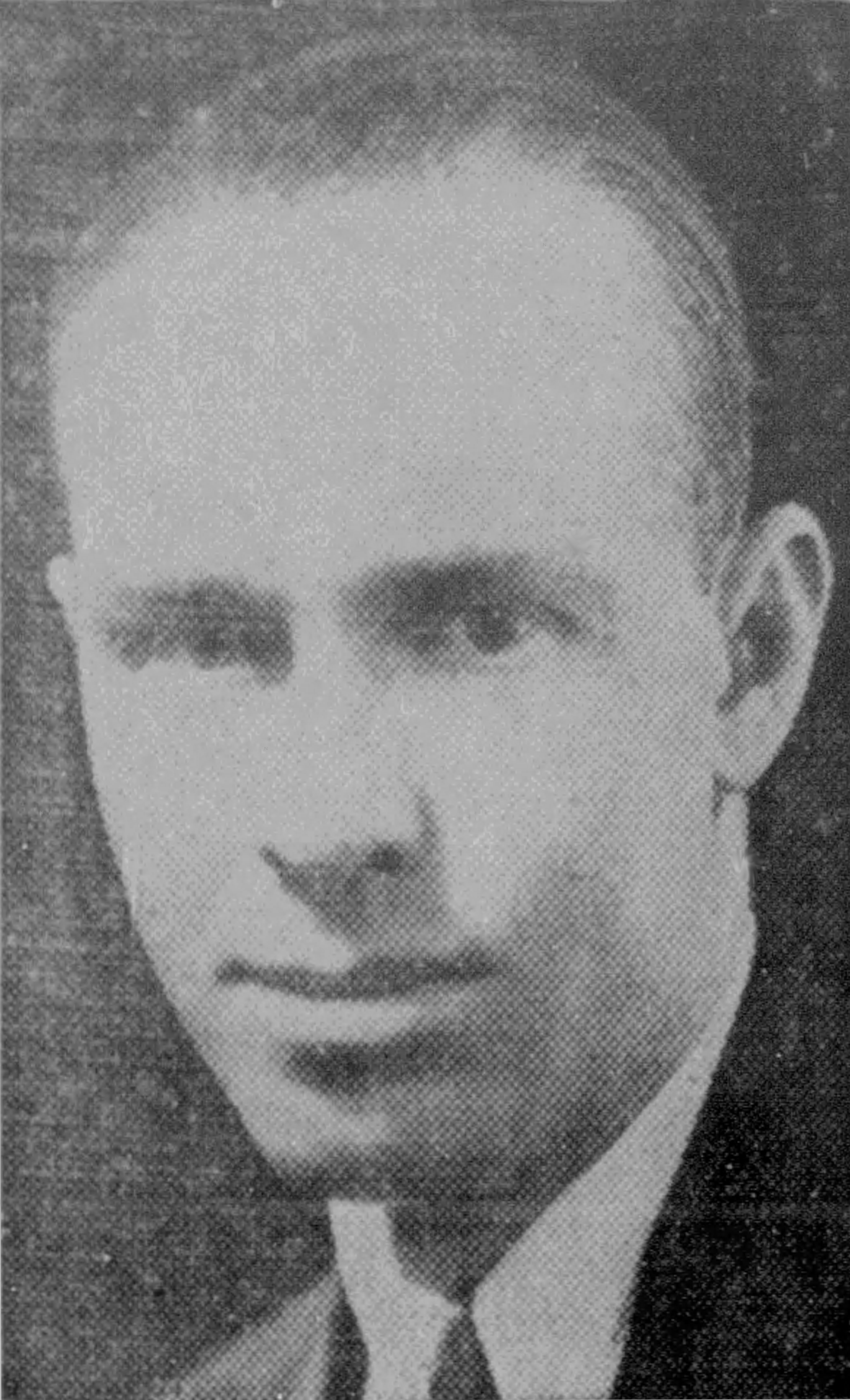
Nominee	Frank A. Barrett	John J. McIntyre
Party	Republican	Democratic
Popular vote	37,963	36,892
Percentage	50.72%	49.28%
U.S. Representative before election
John J. McIntyre
Democratic
Elected U.S. Representative
Frank A. Barrett
Republican

The 1942 United States House of Representatives election in Wyoming was held on November 3, 1942. Incumbent Democratic Congressman John J. McIntyre ran for re-election to a second term. He was challenged in the general election by former State Senator Frank A. Barrett, the Republican nominee. Amid nationwide Republican gains, Barrett narrowly defeated McIntyre, winning 51 percent of the vote to McIntyre's 49 percent.

== Democratic primary ==
=== Candidates ===
- John J. McIntyre, incumbent U.S. Representative
- Lee Ray White, mining engineer

=== Results ===
Democratic primary results
Party	Candidate	Votes	%
Democratic	John J. McIntyre (inc.)	18,217	86.53%
Democratic	Lee Ray White	2,837	100.00%
Total votes		21,054	100.00%

== Republican primary ==
=== Candidates ===
- Frank A. Barrett, member of the University of Wyoming Board of Trustees, former State Senator, 1936 Republican nominee for Congress
- Charles E. Winter, former U.S. Representative
- Frank Emerson, Jr., accountant, son of Governor Frank C. Emerson
- Dale G. Kilburn, Casper pharmacy owner

=== Results ===
Republican primary results
Party	Candidate	Votes	%
Republican	Frank A. Barrett	10,891	38.60%
Republican	Charles E. Winter	9,818	34.80%
Republican	Frank Emerson, Jr.	5,564	19.72%
Republican	Dale G. Kilburn	1,941	6.88%
Total votes		28,214	100.00%

== General election ==
=== Results ===
1942 Wyoming's at-large congressional district general election results
Party	Candidate	Votes	%
Republican	Frank A. Barrett	37,963	50.72%
Democratic	John J. McIntyre (inc.)	36,892	49.28%
Total votes		74,855	100.00%
Republican gain from Democratic			
