= Frank O. Horton =

American politician and rancher (1882–1948)

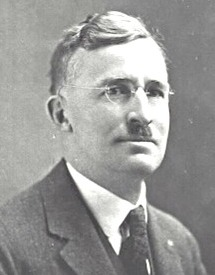
- Horton, c. 1940

Member of the U.S. House of Representatives from Wyoming's at-large district
- In office January 3, 1939 – January 3, 1941
- Preceded by: Paul R. Greever
- Succeeded by: John J. McIntyre

Member of the Wyoming Senate
- In office 1923–1931

President of the Wyoming Senate
- In office 1931

Member of the Wyoming House of Representatives
- In office 1921–1923

Personal details
- Born: Frank Ogilvie Horton; October 18, 1882 Muscatine, Iowa, US
- Died: August 17, 1948 (aged 65) Sheridan, Wyoming, US
- Party: Republican
- Parent: Charles Cummins Horton (father)
- Occupation: Politician, rancher

Frank Ogilvie Horton (October 18, 1882 – August 17, 1948) was an American politician and rancher. A Republican, he was a member of the United States House of Representatives from Wyoming, serving from 1939 to 1941, representing Wyoming's at-large district.

== Early life and education ==
Horton was born on October 18, 1882, in Muscatine, Iowa, the son of Charles Cummins Horton and Belle (née Ogilvie) Horton. His father was for a time a member of the Iowa House of Representatives. According to one source, he was instead born in 1870, in Jones County.

Educated at public schools, Horton studied at the Morgan Park Academy and the University of Chicago, graduating in 1899 and 1903, respectively. At the University of Chicago, he was a member of Alpha Delta Phi.

== Career ==
During the Spanish–American War, Horton served as a private in Company C of the 50th Iowa Infantry Regiment, of the United States Army.

In 1905, Horton moved to Saddlestring, Wyoming, where he worked as a rancher. He operated the H. F. Bar and Paradise Ranches, as guest ranches. From 1928, he was a trustee of the Wyoming Stock Growers Association. He returned to ranching after serving in Congress.

Horton was a Republican. From 1921 to 1923, he was a member of the Wyoming House of Representatives. Ideologically, he was conservative. He opposed high tariffs and laws regressing labor policy.

Horton was a member of the Wyoming Senate from 1923 to 1931. While in the Senate, he was a member of the Committee on Federal Relations, Indians, and Military Affairs; on Mines and Mineral Products; on Railroads and Transportation; and on Stock Raising and Stock Laws. In 1931, he was elected President of the Senate.

Horron was a member of the United States House of Representatives, from January 3, 1939, to January 3, 1941, representing Wyoming's at-large district. While serving, he was a member of the Committees on Agriculture and on Public Lands. In 1939, he introduced a bill which saved Yellowstone National Park from being shrunk. He lost the following election. He unsuccessfully ran in the 1946 United States Senate election in Wyoming, losing to Joseph C. O'Mahoney.

Horton was a delegate to the 1928 and 1936 Republican National Conventions, and was a member of the Republican National Committee from 1937 to 1948. He was a member of Wendell Willkie's strategy board which worked to have him nominated for president; the Muscatine Journal describing his effort to do so as a "blitzkrieg".

== Personal life and death ==
Horton was married to Gertrude Butler, with whom he had three children. He died on August 17, 1882, aged 65, in Sheridan, and was buried at Willow Grove Cemetery, in Buffalo.

U.S. House of Representatives
Preceded by Paul R. Greever	Member of the U.S. House of Representatives from Wyoming's at-large congressional district January 3, 1939 – January 3, 1941	Succeeded by John J. McIntyre
