= Governor Crane =

Governor Crane may refer to:

- Arthur G. Crane (1877–1955), 20th Governor of Wyoming
- Winthrop M. Crane (1853–1920), 40th Governor of Massachusetts
