= 1946 United States House of Representatives election in Wyoming =

1946 United States House of Representatives election in Wyoming, At-large district
- November 5, 1946
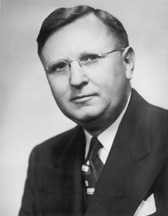

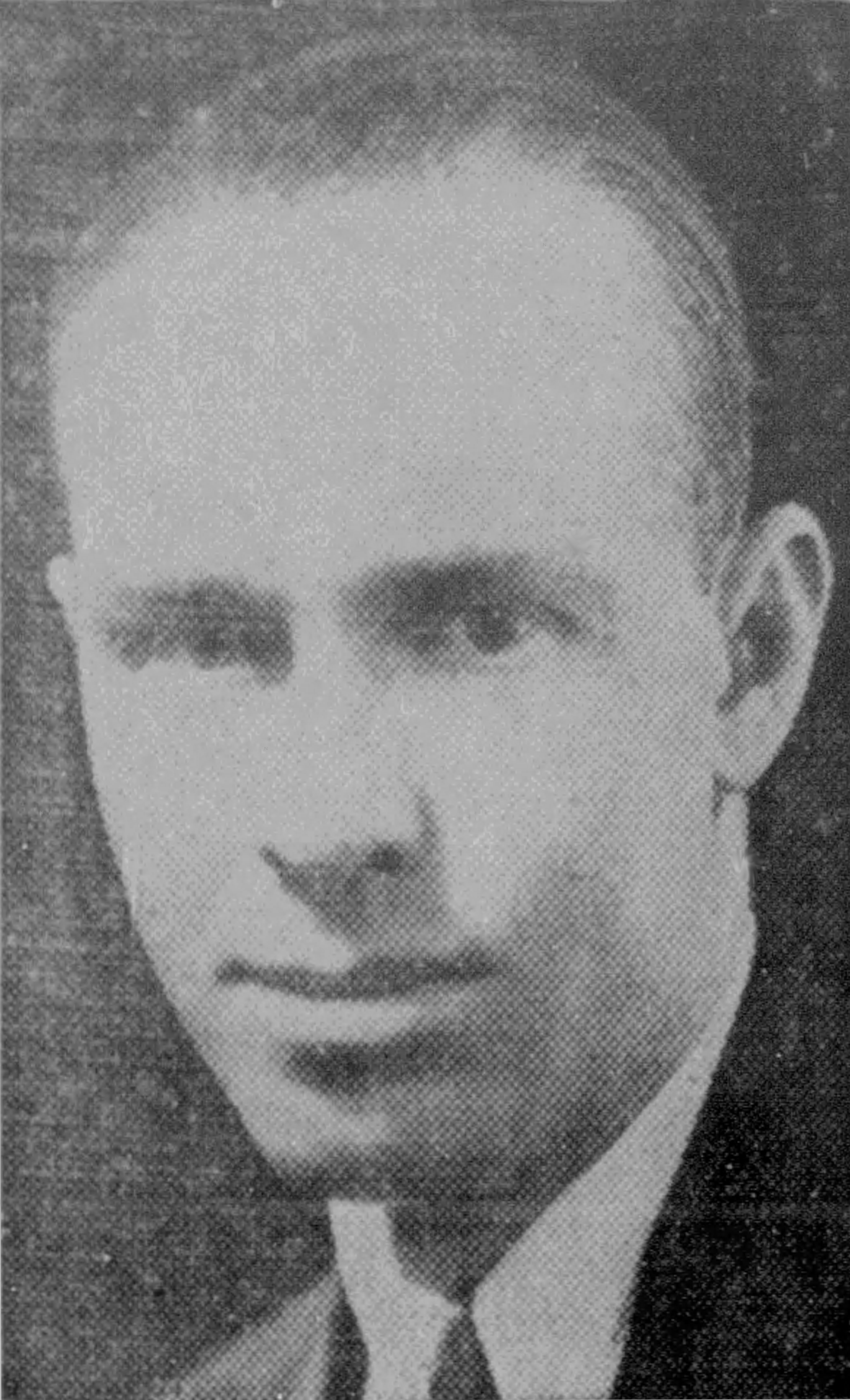
Nominee	Frank A. Barrett	John J. McIntyre
Party	Republican	Democratic
Popular vote	44,482	34,956
Percentage	56.00%	44.00%
U.S. Representative before election
Frank A. Barrett
Republican
Elected U.S. Representative
Frank A. Barrett
Republican

The 1946 United States House of Representatives election in Wyoming was held on November 5, 1946. Incumbent Republican Congressman Frank A. Barrett ran for re-election. He was challenged by the Democratic nominee, John J. McIntyre, the State Auditor and Barrett's predecessor in Congress. Barrett defeated McIntyre by a wide margin, winning his third term.

== Democratic primary ==
=== Candidates ===
- John J. McIntyre, State Auditor, former U.S. Representative

=== Results ===
Democratic primary results
Party	Candidate	Votes	%
Democratic	John J. McIntyre	16,252	100.00%
Total votes		16,252	100.00%

== Republican primary ==
=== Candidates ===
- Frank A. Barrett, incumbent U.S. Representative

=== Results ===
Republican primary results
Party	Candidate	Votes	%
Republican	Frank A. Barrett (inc.)	23,847	100.00%
Total votes		23,847	100.00%

== General election ==
=== Results ===
1946 Wyoming's at-large congressional district general election results
Party	Candidate	Votes	%
Republican	Frank A. Barrett (inc.)	44,482	56.00%
Democratic	John J. McIntyre	34,956	44.00%
Total votes		79,438	100.00%
Republican hold			
