= 1942 Wyoming state elections =

A general election was held in the U.S. state of Wyoming on Tuesday, November 3, 1942. All of the state's executive officers—the governor, secretary of state, auditor, treasurer, and superintendent of public instruction—were up for election. Like the 1938 elections, this year's elections were something of a mixed bag for both parties. Democratic secretary of state Lester C. Hunt defeated Republican governor Nels H. Smith for re-election, but Republicans flipped the secretary of state's office in Hunt's absence. The other incumbents—State Auditor William M. Jack, a Democrat, and Superintendent Esther L. Anderson, a Republican—were re-elected, and Republicans held onto the state treasurer's office.

== Governor ==
After defeating his predecessor, Democrat Leslie A. Miller, by a wide margin in 1938, Republican governor Nels H. Smith faced a tough challenge to his re-election in Secretary of State Lester C. Hunt, the Democratic nominee. Ultimately, Hunt narrowly defeated Smith, winning the first of his two terms as governor.

1942 Wyoming gubernatorial election
Party	Candidate	Votes	%	±%
Democratic	Lester C. Hunt	39,599	51.32%	+11.12%
Republican	Nels H. Smith (inc.)	37,568	48.68%	−11.12%
Majority		2,031	2.63%	−16.98%
Turnout		77,167		
Democratic gain from Republican				

== Secretary of State ==
Secretary of State Lester C. Hunt opted to challenge Republican governor Nels H. Smith for re-election rather than seek a third term as secretary of state, thereby creating an open seat. Susan J. Quealey, a leader in the state Democratic Party, narrowly won the primary over State Representative Raymond E. Morris. In the general election, she faced State Treasurer Mart T. Christensen, and lost to him in a landslide. Fewer than two years into Christensen's term, however, he would die in office; Governor Hunt appointed State Auditor William M. Jack as his replacement.

=== Democratic primary ===
==== Candidates ====
- Susan J. Quealy, Wyoming Democratic Party activist
- Raymond E. Morris, State Representative from Laramie County

==== Results ====
Democratic Party primary results
Party	Candidate	Votes	%
Democratic	Susan J. Quealy	10,344	50.98%
Democratic	Raymond E. Morris	9,947	49.02%
Total votes		20,291	100.00%

=== Republican primary ===
==== Candidates ====
- Mart T. Christensen, State Treasurer

==== Results ====
Republican Primary results
Party	Candidate	Votes	%
Republican	Mart T. Christensen	25,560	100.00%
Total votes		25,560	100.00%

=== General election ===
==== Results ====
1942 Wyoming Secretary of State election
Party	Candidate	Votes	%	±%
Republican	Mart T. Christensen	43,437	58.86%	+13.47%
Democratic	Susan J. Quealy	30,361	41.14%	−13.47%
Majority		13,076	17.72%	+8.49%
Turnout		73,798		
Republican gain from Democratic				

== Auditor ==
Incumbent Democratic Auditor William M. Jack ran for re-election to a third term. After winning a contested Democratic primary against C. A. Johnson, a former state employee, he faced State Representative Everett T. Copenhaver in the general election. Building on his track record of decisive victories, Jack defeated Copenhaver relatively easily, winning 55% of the vote to Copenhaver's 45%. During Jack's third term, he was appointed by Governor Hunt as the successor to the late Secretary of State Mart T. Christensen, who died in office. Governor Hunt would, in turn, appoint Carl Robinson as Jack's successor.

=== Democratic primary ===
==== Candidates ====
- William M. Jack, incumbent state auditor
- C. A. Johnson, former sales tax department employee

==== Results ====
Democratic Party primary results
Party	Candidate	Votes	%
Democratic	William M. Jack (inc.)	17,120	79.37%
Democratic	C. A. Johnson	4,451	20.63%
Total votes		21,571	100.00%

=== Republican primary ===
==== Candidates ====
- Everett T. Copenhaver, State Representative from Converse County

==== Results ====
Republican Primary results
Party	Candidate	Votes	%
Republican	Everett T. Copenhaver	23,400	100.00%
Total votes		23,400	100.00%

=== General election ===
==== Results ====
1942 Wyoming Auditor election
Party	Candidate	Votes	%	±%
Democratic	William M. Jack (inc.)	40,768	54.79%	+0.48%
Republican	Everett T. Copenhaver	33,638	45.21%	−0.48%
Majority		7,130	9.58%	+0.96%
Turnout		74,406		
Democratic hold				

== Treasurer ==
Incumbent Republican state treasurer Mart T. Christensen was unable to seek re-election due to term limits, and instead successfully ran for secretary of state. The open seat became a contest between two former presiding officers of the state legislature: Democratic nominee Henry D. Watenpaugh, the Director of the State Office of Government Reports and the Speaker of the Wyoming House of Representatives from 1935 to 1937, and Republican nominee Earl Wright, the President of the Wyoming State Senate. Despite the strength of both candidates, Wright ended up defeating Watenpaugh comfortably, holding the office for the Republican Party.

=== Democratic primary ===
==== Candidates ====
- Henry D. Watenpaugh, Director of the State Office of Government Reports, former Speaker of the Wyoming House of Representatives

==== Results ====
Democratic Party primary results
Party	Candidate	Votes	%
Democratic	Henry D. Watenpaugh	17,433	100.00%
Total votes		17,433	100.00%

=== Republican primary ===
==== Candidates ====
- Earl Wright, President of the Wyoming State Senate
- Doc Rogers, former deputy secretary of state, 1938 Republican nominee for auditor

==== Results ====
Republican Primary results
Party	Candidate	Votes	%
Republican	Earl Wright	14,221	54.99%
Republican	Doc Rogers	11,639	45.01%
Total votes		25,860	100.00%

=== General election ===
==== Results ====
1942 Wyoming Treasurer election
Party	Candidate	Votes	%	±%
Republican	Earl Wright	42,460	59.23%	+7.21%
Democratic	Henry D. Watenpaugh	29,231	40.77%	−7.21%
Majority		13,229	18.45%	+14.42%
Turnout		71,691		
Republican hold				

== Superintendent of Public Instruction ==
Incumbent Republican superintendent of public instruction Esther L. Anderson ran for re-election to a second term. She was opposed by Democratic nominee Albert L. Keeney, the superintendent of schools in the town of Superior. Keeney proved little challenge to Anderson, who overwhelmingly defeated him for re-election and won the highest percentage of the vote of any statewide candidate in Wyoming that year.

=== Democratic primary ===
==== Candidates ====
- Albert L. Keeney, Superintendent of Superior Schools

==== Results ====
Democratic Party primary results
Party	Candidate	Votes	%
Democratic	Albert L. Keeney	17,391	100.00%
Total votes		17,391	100.00%

=== Republican primary ===
==== Candidates ====
- Esther L. Anderson, incumbent superintendent of public instruction

==== Results ====
Republican Party primary results
Party	Candidate	Votes	%
Republican	Esther L. Anderson (inc.)	26,079	100.00%
Total votes		26,079	100.00%

=== General election ===
==== Results ====
1942 Wyoming Superintendent of Public Instruction election
Party	Candidate	Votes	%	±%
Republican	Esther L. Anderson (inc.)	44,899	60.83%	+8.20%
Democratic	Albert L. Keeney	28,914	39.17%	−8.20%
Majority		15,985	21.66%	+16.40%
Turnout		73,813		
Republican hold				
