= 1946 United States Senate election in Wyoming =

- November 5, 1946
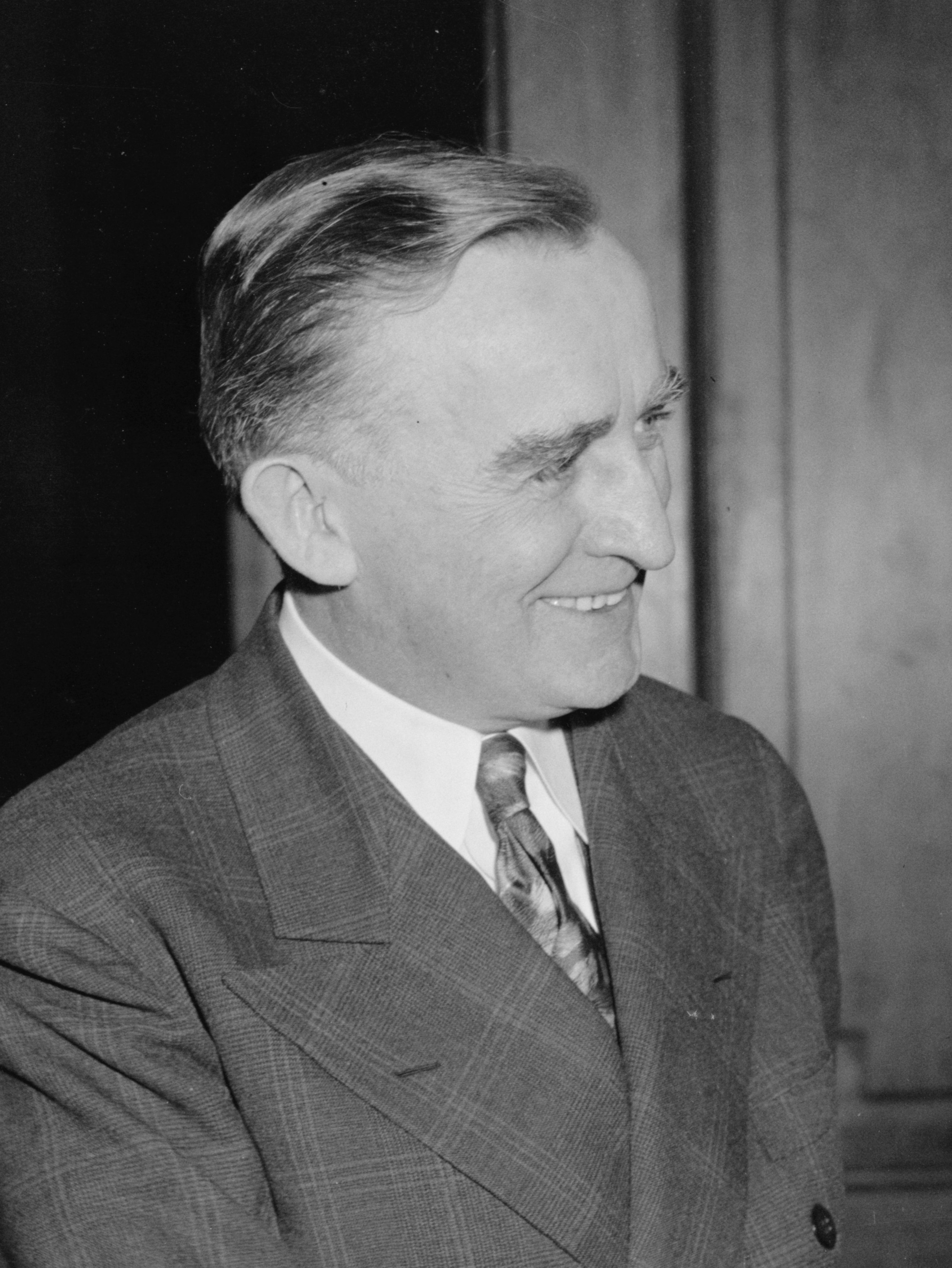
Nominee	Joseph C. O'Mahoney	Harry B. Henderson
Party	Democratic	Republican
Popular vote	45,843	35,714
Percentage	56.21%	43.79%
- County results O'Mahoney: 50–60% 60–70% Henderson: 50–60% 60–70%
U.S. senator before election
Joseph C. O'Mahoney
Democratic
Elected U.S. Senator
Joseph C. O'Mahoney
Democratic

The 1946 United States Senate election in Wyoming took place on November 5, 1946. Democratic senator Joseph C. O'Mahoney ran for re-election to a third term. In the general election, he faced Republican Harry B. Henderson, the former chairman of the Republican Party of Wyoming and a former state senator. Despite the strong performance of the Republican Party nationally, O'Mahoney's popularity was strong enough for him to win re-election yet again by a wide margin, though slightly narrower than his 1940 re-election.

== Democratic primary ==
=== Candidates ===
- Joseph C. O'Mahoney, incumbent U.S. Senator

=== Results ===
Democratic primary
Party	Candidate	Votes	%
Democratic	Joseph C. O'Mahoney (inc.)	17,589	100.00%
Total votes		17,589	100.00%

== Republican primary ==
=== Candidates ===
- Harry B. Henderson, former chairman of the Republican Party of Wyoming, former state senator, 1940 Republican candidate for the U.S. Senate

=== Results ===
Republican primary
Party	Candidate	Votes	%
Republican	Harry B. Henderson	22,757	100.00%
Total votes		22,757	100.00%

== General election ==
=== Results ===
1946 United States Senate election in Wyoming
Party	Candidate	Votes	%	±%
Democratic	Joseph C. O'Mahoney (inc.)	45,843	56.21%	−2.53%
Republican	Harry B. Henderson	35,714	43.79%	+2.53%
Majority		10,129	12.42%	−5.05%
Turnout		81,557		
Democratic hold				
