= Paul R. Greever =

American politician and lawyer (1891–1943)

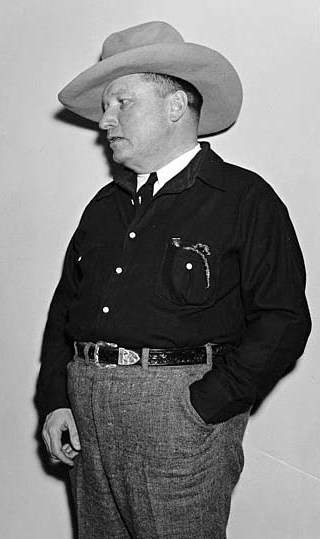
- Greever in 1938, by Harris & Ewing

Member of the U.S. House of Representatives from Wyoming's at-large district
- In office January 3, 1935 – January 3, 1939
- Preceded by: Vincent M. Carter
- Succeeded by: Frank O. Horton

Personal details
- Born: Paul Ranous Greever; September 28, 1891 Lansing, Kansas, US
- Died: February 16, 1943 (aged 51) Cody, Wyoming, US
- Party: Democratic
- Occupation: Politician, lawyer

Military service
- Allegiance: United States
- Branch/service: United States Army
- Rank: First lieutenant
- Unit: 89th Infantry Division
- Battles/wars: World War I; Meuse–Argonne offensive; Battle of Saint-Mihiel

Paul Ranous Greever (September 28, 1891 – February 16, 1943) was an American politician and lawyer. A Democrat, he was a member of the United States House of Representatives from Wyoming.

Born in Kansas, Greever studied at the University of Kansas School of Law. He served in World War I, after which he moved to Wyoming and worked as a lawyer. He was mayor of Cody and served in the House from 1935 to 1939. Ideologically, he aligned with the Progressive movement.

== Early life and education ==
Greever was born on September 28, 1891, in Lansing, Kansas. Educated at local public schools, he graduated from the University of Kansas School of Law in 1917. In college, he was a member of Alpha Sigma Tau and Phi Delta Phi. He then worked as an educator for a year. Also in 1917, he was admitted to the Kansas Bar Association.

== Career ==
From April 1917, to March 1, 1919, during World War I, Greever was a first lieutenant in the 89th Infantry Division. While serving, he fought in the Meuse–Argonne offensive and the Battle of Saint-Mihiel.

After the war, Greever moved to Wyoming. In 1919, he was admitted to the Wyoming State Bar. He began practicing law in Pine Bluffs, Wyoming. He was a banker. In 1921, the people of Pine Bluffs declared Greever a hero for de-escalating and negotiating a loan between him and an armed man. In 1921, he moved to Cody. From 1932 and 1934, he was a trustee of the University of Wyoming.

Greever was a Democrat. He was mayor of Cody from 1930 to 1932. He was a candidate in the 1932 United States House of Representatives election in Wyoming, losing to Vincent Carter. He later served the House from January 3, 1935, to January 3, 1939, representing Wyoming's at-large district. While serving, he co-sponsored the O'Mahoney-Hatch Act, an amendment to the Mineral Leasing Act of 1920.

Greever lost the following House election. On multiple occasions, he considered running for governor, namely in 1938. He was chairman of the political convention which nominated Nellie Tayloe Ross for governor.

Ideologically, Greever leaned liberal. He aligned with President Franklin D. Roosevelt. He championed states' rights, and as a result objected to high tariffs and loans being given by the federal government. He supported the separation of church and state, with him stating that he never let his religion influence a policy decision.

After serving in Congress, Greever returned to practicing law. As a lawyer, he represented oil companies in Tulsa, Oklahoma.

== Personal life and death ==
On September 18, 1922, Greever married Ada M. Hill, with whom he had two children. He was a member of the Episcopal Church, though the Casper Star-Tribune states he was Methodist. He was also a member of the Fraternal Order of Eagles, the Freemasons, and Lions Clubs International. As for his personality, fellow Congressmen described him as "friendly" and a "typical westerner".

Greever died on February 16, 1943, aged 51, in Cody, after shooting himself in the head himself in an accidental discharge, while cleaning his shotgun – either a 12- or a 20-gauge, which lacked a hammer. He was buried on February 19, at Riverside Cemetery, in Cody. An archive of his papers is held by Archives West.

U.S. House of Representatives
Preceded by Vincent M. Carter	Member of the U.S. House of Representatives from Wyoming's at-large congressional district January 3, 1935 – January 3, 1939	Succeeded by Frank O. Horton
