= 1946 Wyoming gubernatorial election =

- November 5, 1946
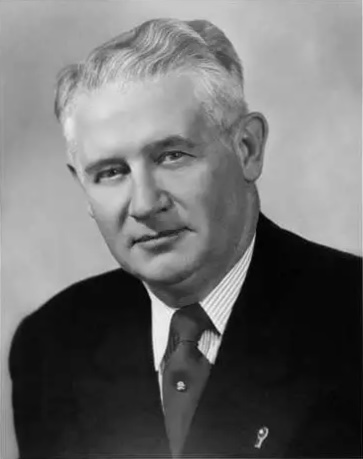

Nominee	Lester C. Hunt	Earl Wright
Party	Democratic	Republican
Popular vote	43,020	38,333
Percentage	52.88%	47.12%
- County results Hunt: 50–60% 60–70% Wright: 50–60% 60–70%
Governor before election
Lester C. Hunt
Democratic
Elected Governor
Lester C. Hunt
Democratic

The 1946 Wyoming gubernatorial election took place on November 5, 1946. Incumbent Democratic Governor Lester C. Hunt ran for re-election to a second term. Former Republican Governor Nels H. Smith, whom Hunt defeated in 1942, announced that he would challenge Hunt for re-election, but he was defeated in the Republican primary by State Treasurer Earl Wright. In the general election, even though the Republican Party had a strong performance nationwide, Wyoming Democrats did well; Hunt defeated Wright by a wider margin than his 1942 victory as Democratic U.S. Senator Joseph C. O'Mahoney similarly won another term.

== Democratic primary ==
=== Candidates ===
- Lester C. Hunt, incumbent Governor

=== Results ===
Democratic primary
Party	Candidate	Votes	%
Democratic	Lester C. Hunt (inc.)	17,456	100.00%
Total votes		17,456	100.00%

== Republican primary ==
=== Candidates ===
- Earl Wright, Wyoming State Treasurer
- Nels H. Smith, former Governor of Wyoming

=== Results ===
Republican primary
Party	Candidate	Votes	%
Republican	Earl Wright	15,272	58.42%
Republican	Nels H. Smith	10,870	41.58%
Total votes		26,142	100.00%

== Results ==
1946 Wyoming gubernatorial election
Party	Candidate	Votes	%	±%
Democratic	Lester C. Hunt (inc.)	43,020	52.88%	+1.56%
Republican	Earl Wright	38,333	47.12%	−1.56%
Majority		4,687	5.76%	+3.13%
Turnout		81,353		
Democratic hold				
