= Edward D. Crippa =

American politician (1899–1960)

Edward David Crippa
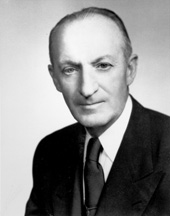

United States Senator from Wyoming
- In office June 24, 1954 – November 28, 1954
- Appointed by: Clifford Joy Rogers
- Preceded by: Lester C. Hunt
- Succeeded by: Joseph C. O'Mahoney

Personal details
- Born: April 8, 1899 Rock Springs, Wyoming, U.S.
- Died: October 20, 1960 (aged 61) Rock Springs, Wyoming, U.S.
- Party: Republican

Edward David Crippa (April 8, 1899 – October 20, 1960) was an American politician who served as a U.S. Senator from Wyoming.

Crippa was born in Rock Springs, Sweetwater County, Wyoming to an Austrian-born mother, Charlotte Ziller (1876 - 1950) and an Italian-born father, August Crippa (1865 - 1926). His father was reportedly a very respected resident of Rock Springs. He had one brother and one sister. He was educated in the public schools of Rock Springs, and during World War I Crippa served as a private in the United States Army.

He served on the Rock Springs city council from 1926 to 1928. He was president of Union Mercantile Company in 1930; owner and manager of Crippa Motor Company in Rock Springs; president of North Side State Bank and director of Rock Springs Fuel Company in 1940; and Wyoming State highway commissioner from 1941 to 1947. In addition, Crippa represented Wyoming on the Republican National Committee.

Crippa was appointed on June 24, 1954, as a Republican to the United States Senate to fill the vacancy caused by the death of Lester C. Hunt and served until November 28, 1954. He was not a candidate for election to fill the vacancy and resumed business activities.

Crippa collapsed at 9 am on October 20, 1960 from an apparent heart attack. He was pronounced dead upon arrival to a Rock Springs hospital. He was buried at Rock Springs Cemetery, in Sweetwater County, Wyoming on October 24, 1960.

He was married to Isabelle Martin; they had no children. She would remarry after his death. She would suffer from a fractured hip in 1965 and was bedridden and used a wheelchair afterwards, although she was able to get out with the use of a cane. She reportedly fell out of her wheelchair early in the morning on December 8, 1966 at her home in Sweetwater County and died as a result. She was 61. She was buried at Evanston City Cemetery in Evanston, Wyoming.

U.S. Senate
Preceded by Lester C. Hunt	U.S. senator (Class 2) from Wyoming; 1954; Served alongside: Frank A. Barrett	Succeeded by Joseph C. O'Mahoney
