= Rebecca Copenhaver =

American philosopher (born 1971)

- Born: 1971 (age 54–55)
- Awards: Graves Award (2004)

Education
- Education: Cornell University (PhD), University of California, Santa Cruz (BA)
- Thesis: The Doors of Perception: Anti-Sensationalism and Direct Realism in Kant and Reid (2002)
- Doctoral advisor: Zoltán Gendler Szabó
- Other advisors: Sydney Shoemaker, Allen W. Wood

Philosophical work
- Era: 21st-century philosophy
- Region: Western philosophy
- Institutions: Washington University in St. Louis
- Main interests: philosophy of mind and perception, aesthetics, early modern philosophy, philosophy of memory

Rebecca Copenhaver (born 1971) is an American philosopher and Professor of Philosophy at Washington University in St. Louis. She is known for her works on philosopher Thomas Reid.

== Books ==
- Philosophy of Mind in the Early Modern and Modern Ages, edited by Rebecca Copenhaver. In A History of the Philosophy of Mind, edited by Rebecca Copenhaver and Christopher Shields. 6 volumes. London and New York: Routledge 2018
- Thomas Reid on Mind, Knowledge, and Value, edited by Todd Buras and Rebecca Copenhaver. Mind Occasional Series, Oxford: Oxford University Press 2015
- From Kant to Croce: Modern Philosophy in Italy, 1800–1950, With Brian P. Copenhaver, Toronto: University of Toronto Press 2012
