= Verda James =

American politician (1901–1991)

Speaker of the Wyoming House of Representatives
- In office 1969–1970

Member of the Wyoming House of Representatives from Natrona County
- In office 1954–1970

Personal details
- Born: 27 September 1901 Stratford, Ontario, Canada
- Died: 15 October 1991 (aged 90)
- Party: Republican
- Education: University of Iowa (BA); University of Denver (MA)

Verda James (September 27, 1901 – October 15, 1991) was a Canadian-born American politician. She was a member of the Wyoming House of Representatives between 1954 and 1970, and was elected the Speaker of the Wyoming House of Representatives in her final legislative term, the first woman to serve a full term as the legislative body's presiding officer.

== Early life ==
She was born to parents William Henry James, a railroad worker, and Sarah Ann James, in the town of Stratford, Ontario in Canada, on September 27, 1901. She studied at the University of Iowa, and graduated in 1927. After graduating she became a teacher, teaching in Algona, Iowa. She then moved to Casper, Wyoming, where she taught at English at Natrona County High School from 1927 to 1939. She later attended the University of Denver where she earned a master's degree.

== Career ==
From 1940 to 1950 she served as state deputy director of public instruction. She also worked in the Wyoming Department of Education as director of the Division of Special Education. In that position, she helped establish the School for the Deaf in Casper, Wyoming. She also designed remedial reading programs for the state. At Casper College, she taught English and Education. She worked in the Natrona County public schools administration from 1958 to 1967.

In 1954, James won election to the Wyoming House of Representatives representing Natrona County. She would serve eight consecutive terms in the House. During her time in the House, she served as chair of the House Education Committee. She also served on Governor Clifford Hansen's committee on Education and the Status of Women.

She was unanimously elected speaker of the Wyoming House of Representatives in 1969. As speaker, she helped pass a 1% tax to save the state's finances and create the Department of Economic Planning and Development.

On October 15, 1991, James died at age 90.

== Legacy ==
The Verda James Elementary School in Natrona County, Wyoming was named in honor of her.

Political offices
Preceded by William Swanton	Speaker of the Wyoming House of Representatives; 1969–1970	Succeeded by Ward Myers
