= Dave Havern =

American football player and coach

David Havern
Profile
- Position: Quarterback

Career information
- College: Pittsburgh

David Havern is an American college football coach and former player. He was a quarterback for the University of Pittsburgh football team from 1968 through 1971, a Dapper Dan award winner, and holder of the school's passing records until they were later broken by Dan Marino. After his playing career, Havern became a mentor to eventual National Football League (NFL) quarterback Marc Bulger while Bulger attended West Virginia.

Havern was the head football coach of the Shady Side Academy Bulldogs in Pittsburgh. He retired in 2017, but remains a football consultant and mentor.
