= 1940 United States Senate election in Wyoming =

- November 5, 1940
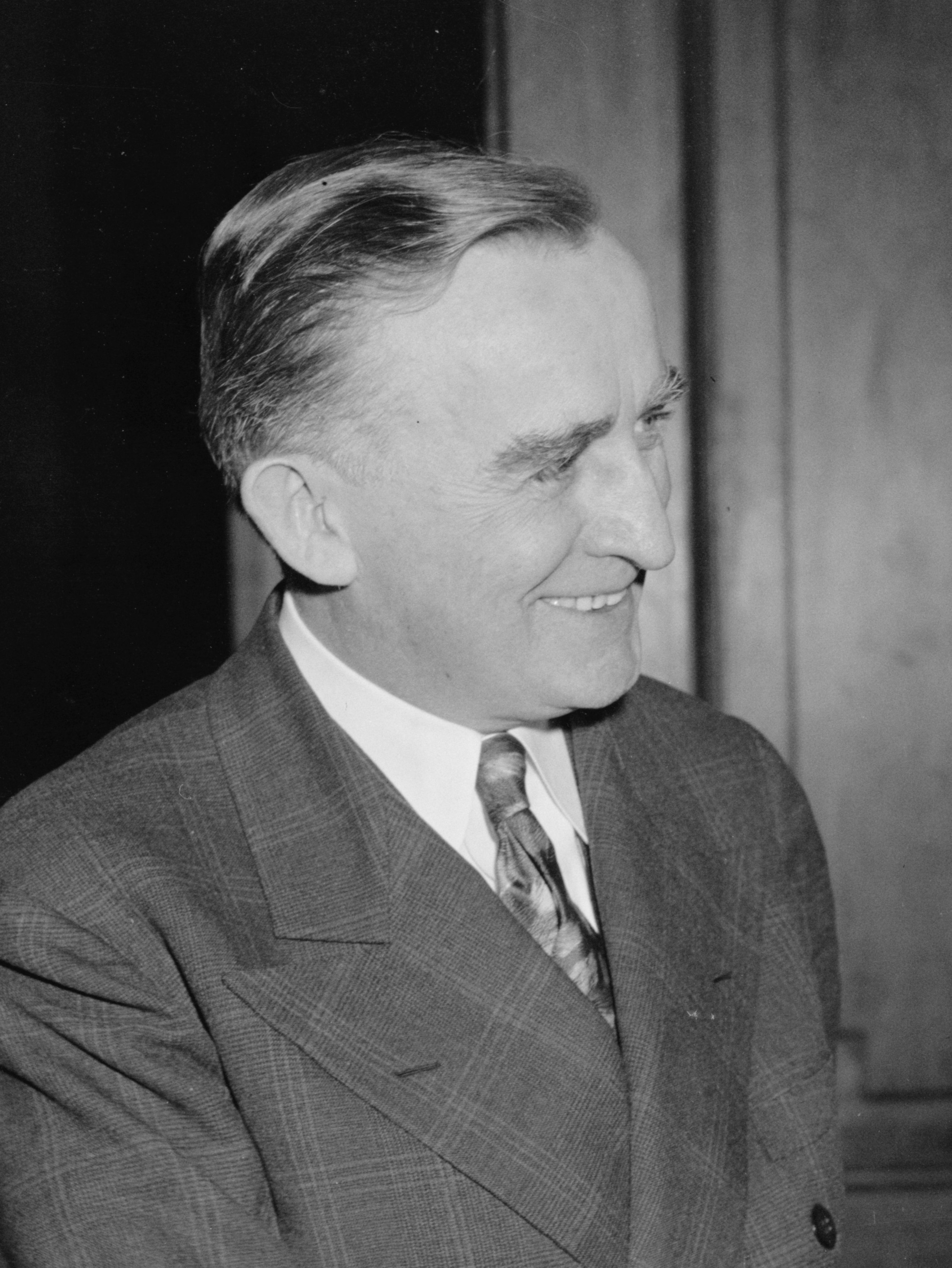

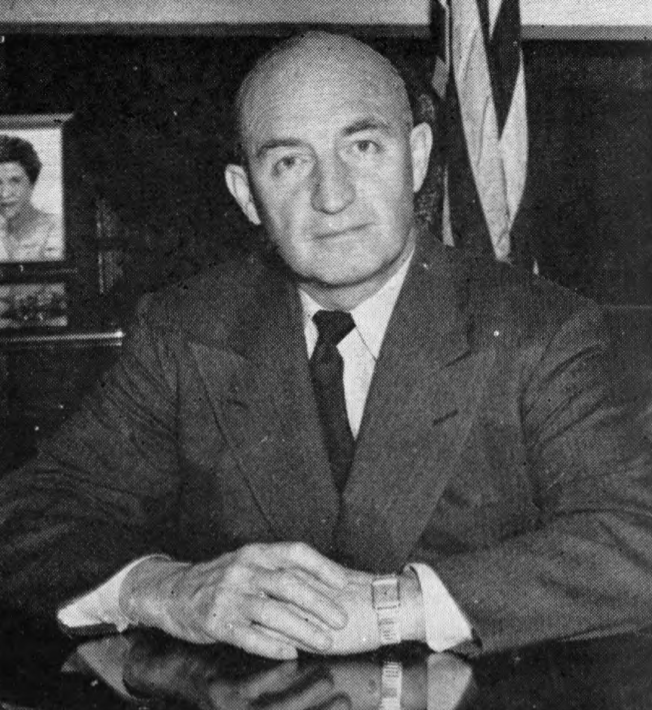
Nominee	Joseph C. O'Mahoney	Milward Simpson
Party	Democratic	Republican
Popular vote	65,022	45,682
Percentage	58.74%	41.26%
- County results O'Mahoney: 50–60% 60–70% 70–80% Simpson: 50–60%
U.S. senator before election
Joseph C. O'Mahoney
Democratic
Elected U.S. Senator
Joseph C. O'Mahoney
Democratic

The 1940 United States Senate election in Wyoming took place on November 5, 1940. Democratic Senator Joseph C. O'Mahoney ran for re-election to a second full term. He faced Republican Milward Simpson, a member of the University of Wyoming Board of Trustees and a former State Representative, in the general election. Though the presidential election in Wyoming was relatively close, O'Mahoney outperformed President Franklin D. Roosevelt, and defeated Simpson in a landslide to win his second term.

== Democratic primary ==
=== Candidates ===
- Joseph C. O'Mahoney, incumbent U.S. Senator
- Cecil W. Clark, former Weston County Prosecuting Attorney

=== Results ===
Democratic primary
Party	Candidate	Votes	%
Democratic	Joseph C. O'Mahoney (inc.)	25,473	90.45%
Democratic	Cecil W. Clark	2,688	9.55%
Total votes		28,161	100.00%

== Republican primary ==
=== Candidates ===
- Milward Simpson, member of the University of Wyoming Board of Trustees, former State Representative
- Harry B. Henderson Jr., State Senator
- Charles E. Winter, former U.S. Congressman
- Irving W. Dinsmore, former State Senator
- R. R. Crow, State Representative

=== Results ===
Republican primary
Party	Candidate	Votes	%
Republican	Milward Simpson	12,014	37.47%
Republican	Harry B. Henderson, Jr.	8,816	27.49%
Republican	Charles E. Winter	6,128	19.11%
Republican	Irving W. Dinsmore	2,910	9.08%
Republican	R. R. Crow	2,197	6.85%
Total votes		32,065	100.00%

== General election ==
=== Results ===
1940 United States Senate election in Wyoming
Party	Candidate	Votes	%	±%
Democratic	Joseph C. O'Mahoney (inc.)	65,022	58.74%	+2.11%
Republican	Milward Simpson	45,682	41.26%	−1.69%
Majority		19,340	17.47%	+3.80%
Turnout		110,704		
Democratic hold				
