= Ross D. Copenhaver =

American politician

Member of the Wyoming House of Representatives
- In office 1973–1978

Personal details
- Born: March 4, 1924 Douglas, Wyoming, U.S.
- Died: June 10, 1993 (aged 69)
- Party: Republican
- Parent: Everett T. Copenhaver
- Education: University of Wyoming

Ross D. Copenhaver (March 4, 1924 – June 10, 1993) was an American politician. He served as a Republican member of the Wyoming House of Representatives.

== Life and career ==
Copenhaver was born in Douglas, Wyoming. He attended Douglas High School and the University of Wyoming.

Copenhaver served in the Wyoming House of Representatives from 1973 to 1978.

Copenhaver died on June 10, 1993, at the age of 69.
