= Copenhaver, West Virginia =

Unincorporated community in West Virginia, United States

- Unincorporated community
- Location in West Virginia and the United States Copenhaver (the United States)
- Coordinates: 38°25′52″N 81°31′19″W
- Country: United States
- State: West Virginia
- County: Kanawha
- Elevation: 650 ft (200 m)
- Time zone: UTC-5 (Eastern (EST))
  - Summer (DST): UTC-4 (EDT)
- GNIS ID: 1741871

Copenhaver was an unincorporated community in Kanawha County, West Virginia, United States. Its post office is closed.

The community was named after the local Copenhaver family.
