= Haver =

Haver is a German, Dutch and English surname. In Germany or England it refers to oats and is used as an occupational surname for a grower or seller of oats. In the Netherlands it is an occupational surname for a wood or stone cutter. The surname may refer to the following notable people:

- June Haver (1926–2005), American actress
- Phyllis Haver (1899–1960), American actress
- Ralph Haver (20th century), American architect
- Shaye Lynne Haver (21st century), American soldier

== See also ==
- O'Haver
