= 1948 United States Senate election in Wyoming =

- November 2, 1948
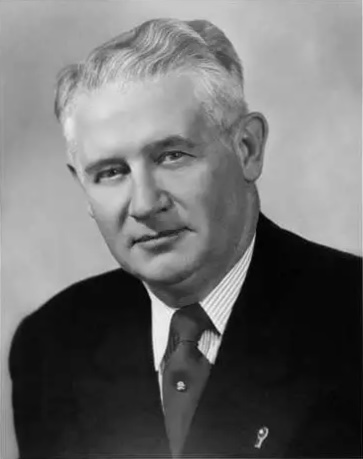

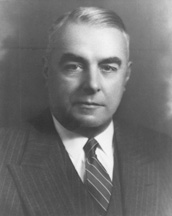
Nominee	Lester C. Hunt	Edward V. Robertson
Party	Democratic	Republican
Popular vote	57,953	43,527
Percentage	57.11%	42.89%
- County results Hunt: 50–60% 60–70% 70–80% Robertson: 50–60% 60–70%
U.S. senator before election
Edward V. Robertson
Republican
Elected U.S. Senator
Lester C. Hunt
Democratic

The 1948 United States Senate election in Wyoming was held on November 2, 1948. First-term Republican Senator Edward V. Robertson ran for re-election to a second term. He was challenged in the general election by Democrat Lester C. Hunt, the Governor of Wyoming. Aided in part by President Harry S. Truman's narrow victory in Wyoming over Republican Thomas E. Dewey, and with his own record of winning statewide in Wyoming, Hunt defeated Robertson in a landslide. However, Hunt would not serve a full term in the Senate; he died by suicide on June 19, 1954, and Republican Edward D. Crippa was appointed to replace him. As of 2023, this was the last time an incumbent Senator from Wyoming lost re-election for this seat.

== Democratic primary ==
=== Candidates ===
- Lester C. Hunt, Governor of Wyoming
- Carl A. Johnson

=== Results ===
Democratic primary
Party	Candidate	Votes	%
Democratic	Lester C. Hunt	21,263	90.33%
Democratic	Carl A. Johnson	2,275	9.67%
Total votes		323,538	100.00%

== Republican primary ==
=== Candidates ===
- Edward V. Robertson, incumbent U.S. Senator

=== Results ===
Republican primary
Party	Candidate	Votes	%
Republican	Edward Vivian Robertson (inc.)	23,129	100.00%
Total votes		23,129	100.00%

== General election ==
=== Results ===
1948 United States Senate election in Wyoming
Party	Candidate	Votes	%	±%
Democratic	Lester C. Hunt	57,953	57.11%	+11.70%
Republican	Edward V. Robertson (inc.)	43,527	42.89%	−11.70%
Majority		14,426	14.22%	+5.03%
Turnout		101,480		
Democratic gain from Republican				
