= 1952 United States Senate election in Wyoming =

- November 4, 1952
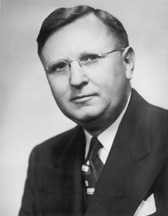

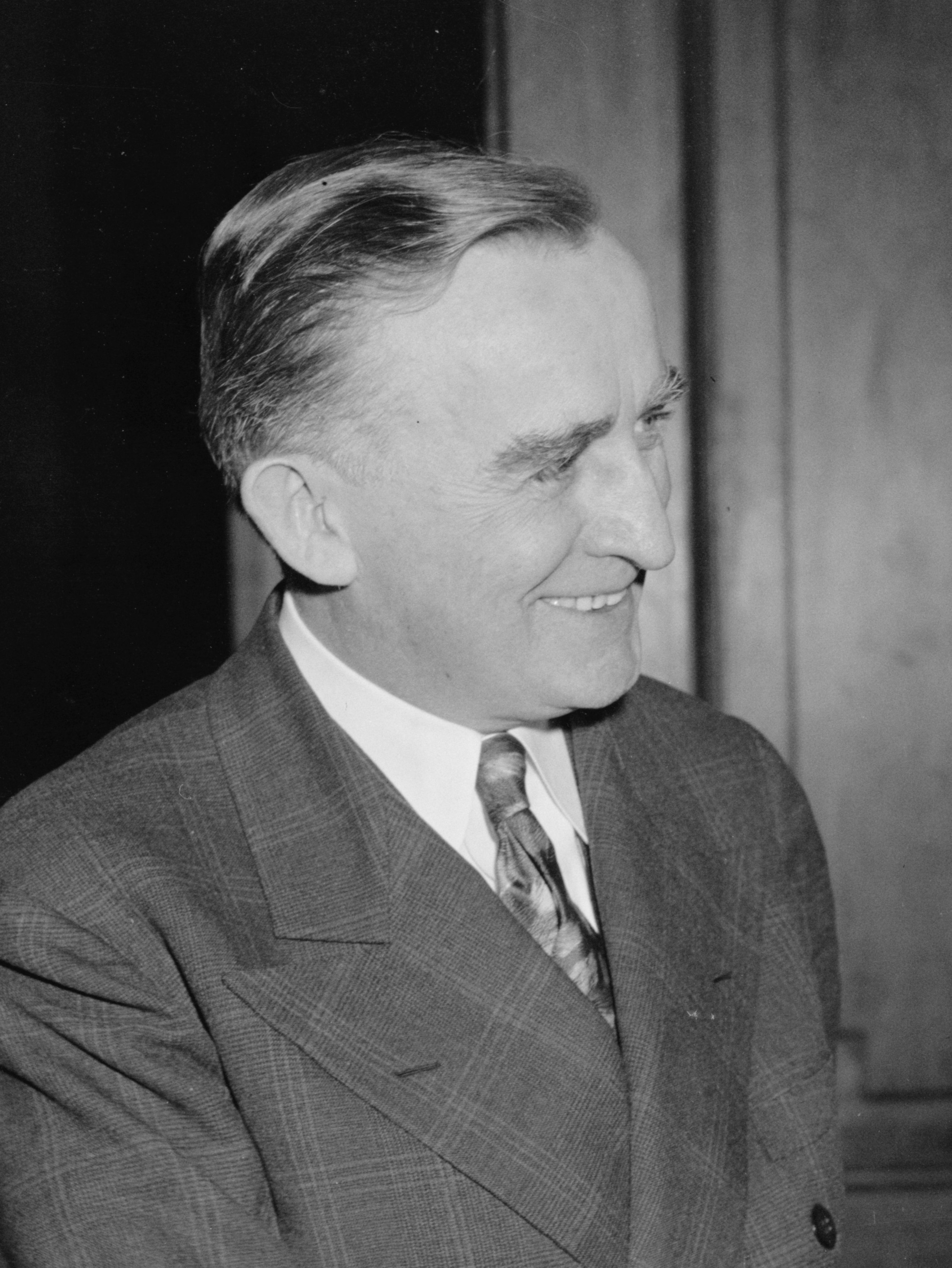
Nominee	Frank A. Barrett	Joseph C. O'Mahoney
Party	Republican	Democratic
Popular vote	67,176	62,921
Percentage	51.64%	48.36%
- County results Barrett: 50–60% 60–70% 70–80% O'Mahoney: 50–60% 60–70% 70–80%
U.S. senator before election
Joseph C. O'Mahoney
Democratic
Elected U.S. Senator
Frank A. Barrett
Republican

The 1952 United States Senate election in Wyoming took place November 4, 1952. Incumbent Democratic senator Joseph C. O'Mahoney ran for his fourth consecutive term. He faced a strong challenge from Republican governor Frank A. Barrett, and faced difficult headwinds as Dwight D. Eisenhower, the Republican nominee for president, was winning Wyoming in a landslide over Democratic nominee Adlai Stevenson. Despite his history of strong performances in the increasingly conservative state, however, O'Mahoney was unable to replicate it, and narrowly lost to Barrett. However, O'Mahoney later returned to the Senate as he held Wyoming’s other Senate seat from 1954 to 1961.

== Democratic primary ==
=== Candidates ===
- Joseph C. O'Mahoney, incumbent U.S. Senator

=== Results ===
Democratic primary
Party	Candidate	Votes	%
Democratic	Joseph C. O'Mahoney (inc.)	27,334	100.00%
Total votes		27,334	100.00%

== Republican primary ==
=== Candidates ===
- Frank A. Barrett, incumbent governor of Wyoming

=== Results ===
Republican primary
Party	Candidate	Votes	%
Republican	Frank A. Barrett	35,444	100.00%
Total votes		35,444	100.00%

== General election ==
=== Results ===
1952 United States Senate election in Wyoming
Party	Candidate	Votes	%	±%
Republican	Frank A. Barrett	67,176	51.64%	+7.85%
Democratic	Joseph C. O'Mahoney (inc.)	62,921	48.36%	−7.85%
Majority		4,255	3.27%	−9.15%
Turnout		130,097		
Republican gain from Democratic				
