= Joseph C. O'Mahoney =

American politician (1884–1962)

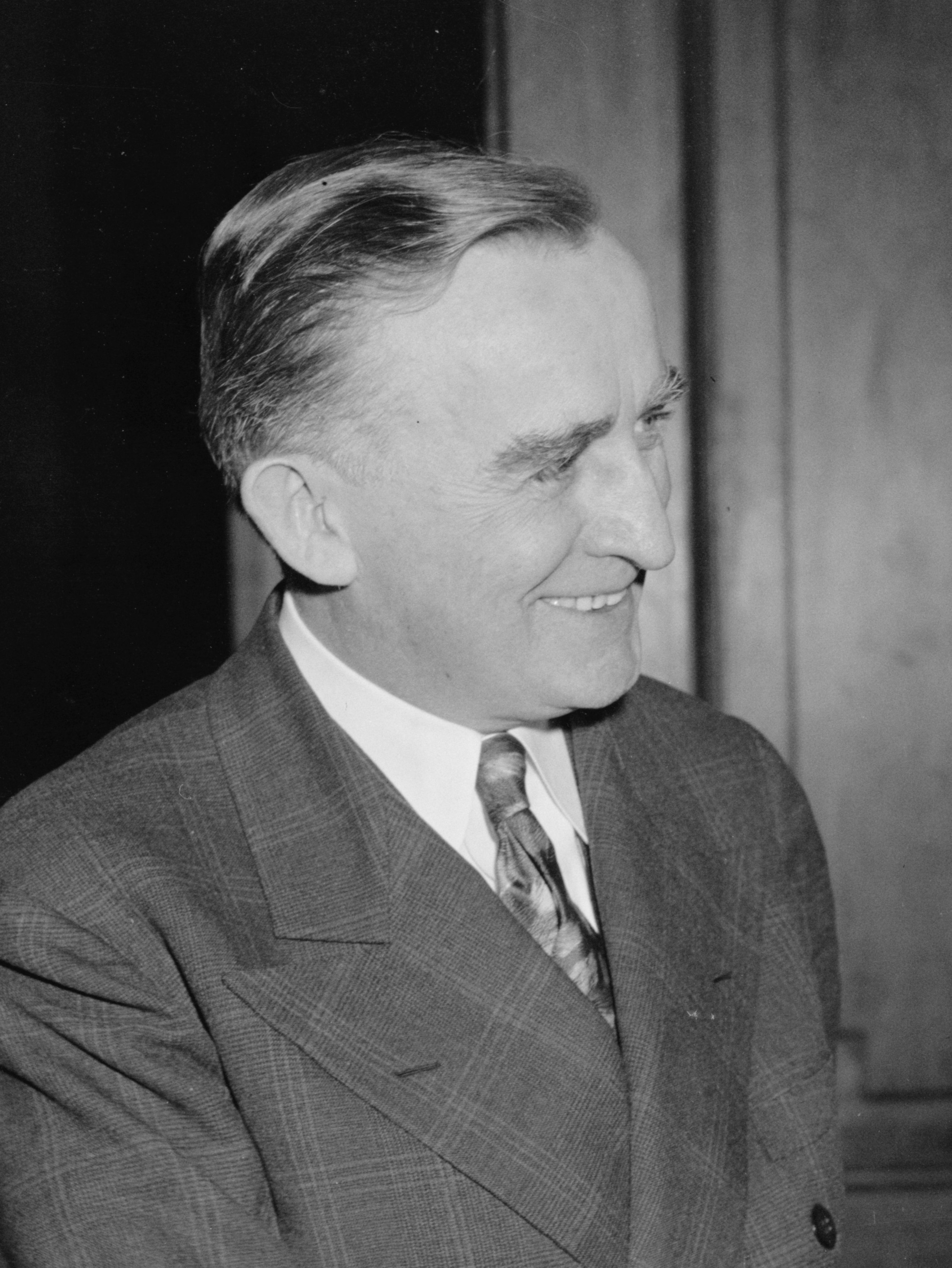

United States Senator from Wyoming
- In office November 29, 1954 – January 3, 1961
- Preceded by: Edward D. Crippa
- Succeeded by: Keith Thomson (elect); John J. Hickey
- In office January 1, 1934 – January 3, 1953
- Preceded by: John B. Kendrick
- Succeeded by: Frank A. Barrett

Personal details
- Born: Joseph Christopher O'Mahoney; November 5, 1884 Chelsea, Massachusetts, U.S.
- Died: December 1, 1962 (aged 78) Bethesda, Maryland, U.S.
- Party: Democratic
- Spouse: Agnes Veronica O'Leary (m. 1913)
- Education: Columbia University; Georgetown University Law School

Joseph Christopher O'Mahoney (November 5, 1884 – December 1, 1962) was an American journalist, lawyer, and politician. A Democrat, he served four complete terms as a U.S. senator from Wyoming on two occasions, first from 1933 to 1953 and then again from 1954 to 1961.

== Early life and career ==
One of eleven children, Joseph O'Mahoney was born in Chelsea, Massachusetts, to Dennis and Elizabeth (née Sheehan) O'Mahoney. His parents were both Irish immigrants; his father, who came to the United States in 1861, worked as a furrier. He received his early education at the Cambridge Latin School. He attended Columbia University in New York City from 1905 until 1907, when he began a career in journalism. He was a reporter on the Cambridge Democrat before moving west to Boulder, Colorado, where he worked for the Herald (1908–1916). He married Agnes Veronica O'Leary in 1913.

In 1916, he moved to Cheyenne, Wyoming, to become city editor of the State Leader, whose owner was Governor John B. Kendrick. Although he supported Theodore Roosevelt in the 1912 presidential election, O'Mahoney switched to the Democratic Party the same year he joined the State Leader. Governor Kendrick became a U.S. senator in March 1917, and O'Mahoney accompanied him to Washington, D.C. as his executive secretary, a position he held for three years. While working in Washington, he studied at Georgetown University Law School and received his Bachelor of Laws degree in 1920.

O'Mahoney was admitted to the bar in 1920, and subsequently returned to Cheyenne to set up his law practice. He was particularly active in legal matters stemming from the Mineral Leasing Act and, through his work, learned of impending leases on the Teapot Naval Oil Reserve; he encouraged Senator Kendrick to seek an investigation into these leases, which subsequently unearthed the Teapot Dome scandal. O'Mahoney became active in Democratic politics, serving as vice-chairman of the Wyoming Democratic Party from 1922 to 1930. He was also a delegate to the Democratic state conventions from 1924 through 1932. Representing Wyoming, he was a member of the Conference on Uniform State Laws from 1925 to 1926. He later served as city attorney of Cheyenne from 1929 to 1931.

In 1929, O'Mahoney was elected a Democratic national committeeman, serving until 1934. He was a delegate to the 1932 Democratic National Convention in Chicago, Illinois, where he was a member of the subcommittee which prepared the party's platform. After the convention, he became vice-chairman of the campaign committee. Following the election of Franklin D. Roosevelt, DNC chairman James Farley was selected as U.S. Postmaster General. As a reward for his work at the 1932 convention, O'Mahoney was appointed by Farley to be the First Assistant Postmaster General, serving from March to December 1933.

== United States Senator ==
On December 18, 1933, O'Mahoney was appointed to the U.S. Senate by Governor Leslie A. Miller to fill the vacancy caused by the death of Senator Kendrick. He was elected to a full six-year term in 1934, defeating Republican congressman Vincent Carter by a margin of 57% to 43%. He was re-elected to a second term over Milward L. Simpson in 1940, and defeated Harry B. Henderson for a third term in 1946.

During his early tenure in the Senate, O'Mahoney supported most of the New Deal programs, with the notable exception of President Franklin D. Roosevelt's "court-packing plan". He earned a reputation as a strong opponent of big business and monopolies, and was heavily involved with anti-trust legislation. One of his first actions as a senator was to introduce legislation requiring federal licensing for corporations engaged in interstate commerce. He was a leading supporter of the creation of the Temporary National Economic Committee, which he chaired from 1938 to 1941. He also supported wool, cattle, oil, and conservation legislation, and sponsored the Casper-Alcova reclamation project. He served as chairman of the Committee on Indian Affairs (1943–1947), Committee on Interior and Insular Affairs (1949–1953), and co-chairman of the Joint Committee on the Economic Report (1949–1953).

O'Mahoney was among twelve nominated at the 1944 Democratic National Convention to serve as Roosevelt's running mate in the presidential election that year. In 1952, as Republican Dwight D. Eisenhower won the presidential election in a landslide, O'Mahoney was narrowly defeated for re-election by Governor Frank A. Barrett by a margin of 52% to 48%. He subsequently returned to the private practice of law in Wyoming. Following the suicide of Senator Lester C. Hunt in June 1954, O'Mahoney was elected the following November both to serve out Hunt's term and to a full term. He defeated Congressman William H. Harrison, the great-great-grandson of William Henry Harrison (9th President of the United States) and grandson of Benjamin Harrison (23rd President of the United States), by a margin of 52% to 48%.

Upon his return to the Senate, O'Mahoney became a strong opponent of the Dixon-Yates contract, which provided for a private company to build a plant to provide power to the Tennessee Valley Authority (TVA) to replace the power that the TVA sold to the Atomic Energy Commission. He sponsored legislation to require "concentrated industries" to give public notification and justification of price increases, to prohibit automobile manufacturers from operating finance firms, to grant Alaska and Hawaii statehood, and to require nominees for federal judgeships take an oath prior to confirmation that they would not render decisions contrary to the U.S. Constitution. His advocacy of jury trials in civil rights cases helped obtain enough votes to pass the Civil Rights Act of 1957, and he opposed the confirmation of Lewis Strauss as U.S. Secretary of Commerce. One of the last bills he introduced was to abolish the insurance rate-making body of the District of Columbia, which he believed was guaranteeing high rates to insurance companies rather than looking out for the public welfare.

== Later life and death ==
After suffering a stroke in June 1959, O'Mahoney decided not to seek re-election in 1960. He made his last speech on the Senate floor on August 29, 1960; he was brought to the floor in a wheelchair by Senator Wayne Morse, who predicted O'Mahoney would be remembered as the "most effective and able" senator to try to protect free enterprise. He resumed his law practice in Washington and Cheyenne.

O'Mahoney died at the Naval Hospital in Bethesda, Maryland, at age 78. He is buried at Mount Olivet Cemetery in Cheyenne.

== See also ==
- List of United States senators from Wyoming

Party political offices
Preceded by John B. Kendrick	Democratic nominee for U.S. Senator from Wyoming (Class 1); 1934, 1940, 1946, 1952	Succeeded by Gale W. McGee
Preceded by Lester C. Hunt	Democratic nominee for U.S. Senator from Wyoming (Class 2); 1954	Succeeded by Raymond B. Whitaker
U.S. Senate
Preceded by John B. Kendrick	U.S. senator (Class 1) from Wyoming; 1934–1953; Served alongside: Robert D. Carey, Henry H. Schwartz, Edward V. Robertson, Lester C. Hunt	Succeeded by Frank A. Barrett
Preceded by Edward D. Crippa	U.S. senator (Class 2) from Wyoming; 1954–1961; Served alongside: Frank A. Barrett, Gale W. McGee	Succeeded by Keith Thomson elect John J. Hickey
