= Frank A. Barrett =

American politician (1892–1962)

Frank Aloysius Barrett
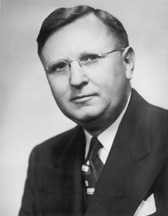

United States Senator from Wyoming
- In office January 3, 1953 – January 3, 1959
- Preceded by: Joseph C. O'Mahoney
- Succeeded by: Gale W. McGee

21st Governor of Wyoming
- In office January 1, 1951 – January 3, 1953
- Preceded by: Arthur G. Crane
- Succeeded by: Clifford Joy Rogers

Member of the U.S. House of Representatives from Wyoming's at-large district
- In office January 3, 1943 – December 31, 1950
- Preceded by: John J. McIntyre
- Succeeded by: William Harrison

Member of the Wyoming Senate
- In office 1933-1935

Personal details
- Born: November 10, 1892 Omaha, Nebraska, U.S.
- Died: May 30, 1962 (aged 69) Cheyenne, Wyoming, U.S.
- Party: Republican
- Spouse(s): Alice Catherine Donoghue (first wife); Augusta K. Hogan (second wife)
- Children: James E. Barrett and Francis Anthony Barrett
- Education: Creighton University
- Profession: Soldier, lawyer and politician

Military service
- Allegiance: United States
- Branch/service: United States Army
- Years of service: 1917–1919
- Rank: Sergeant
- Unit: Balloon Corps
- Battles/wars: World War I

Frank Aloysius Barrett (November 10, 1892 – May 30, 1962) was an American soldier, lawyer and politician. He served as a Republican member of the United States House of Representatives and the United States Senate, and as the 21st governor of Wyoming.

== Biography ==
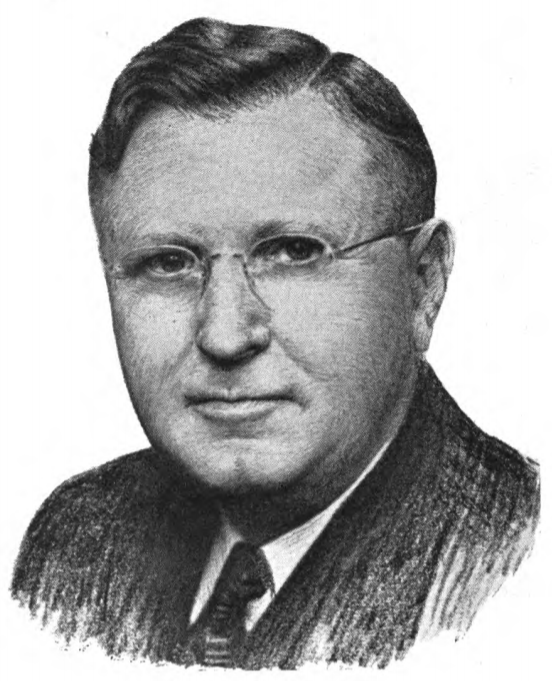
Barrett as governor.

Barrett was born in Omaha, Nebraska, to a family of eight. His parents were Patrick J. Barrett and Elizabeth A. Curran Barrett. His mother and his paternal grandparents emigrated to the United States from Ireland. He studied law and science at Creighton University, and worked as a postal employee at the same time. During World War I, Barrett joined the Balloon Corps of the United States Army for a two-year enlistment. He married Alice Catherine Donoghue on May 21, 1919, and they moved to Lusk, Wyoming.

After arriving in Lusk, Barrett put his law degree to good use, acting as county attorney for Niobrara from 1922 until 1934. He served in the Wyoming Senate from 1933 until 1935, then served on the Board of Trustees of the University of Wyoming. He first ran for Federal office in 1936, but lost out to Paul Greever. He stood for Congress again in 1942, and won, serving there until 1950. In 1951, Barrett was sworn in as Governor. He resigned in 1953 after he was elected to the U.S. Senate in 1952, when he unseated three-term incumbent Joseph C. O'Mahoney. Barrett voted in favor of the Civil Rights Act of 1957. He was defeated after only one term by one of O'Mahoney's former aides, Gale McGee.

== Family life ==
On February 17, 1956, his wife Alice died of cancer. They had had four children together, one of whom had died in infancy. On April 4, 1959, he remarried, to Augusta K. Hogan. Barrett completed his term in the Senate in 1958, and narrowly lost his re-election bid. In 1959 he was appointed Chief Counsel of the Department of Agriculture and sat on the board of directors of the Commodity Credit Corporation. His son, James E. Barrett, was a senior judge of the United States Court of Appeals, Tenth Circuit and former judge of the United States Foreign Intelligence Surveillance Court of Review in Washington, D.C.

== Death ==
Barrett was diagnosed with leukemia on May 15, 1962, and died just fifteen days later, at the age of 69. He was interred at Lusk Cemetery in Lusk. Barrett was a devout Catholic, and a member of the Knights of Columbus.

Party political offices
Preceded by Earl Wright	Republican nominee for Governor of Wyoming; 1950	Succeeded by Milward Simpson
Preceded by Harry B. Henderson	Republican nominee for U.S. Senator from Wyoming (Class 1); 1952, 1958	Succeeded by John S. Wold
U.S. House of Representatives
Preceded by John J. McIntyre	Member of the U.S. House of Representatives from Wyoming's at-large congressional district January 3, 1943 – December 31, 1950	Succeeded by William H. Harrison
Political offices
Preceded by Arthur G. Crane	Governor of Wyoming; January 1, 1951 – January 3, 1953	Succeeded by Clifford Joy Rogers
U.S. Senate
Preceded by Joseph O'Mahoney	U.S. senator (Class 1) from Wyoming; January 3, 1953 – January 3, 1959; Served alongside: Lester C. Hunt, Edward D. Crippa, Joseph C. O'Mahoney	Succeeded by Gale W. McGee
