= John J. McIntyre (politician) =

American judge

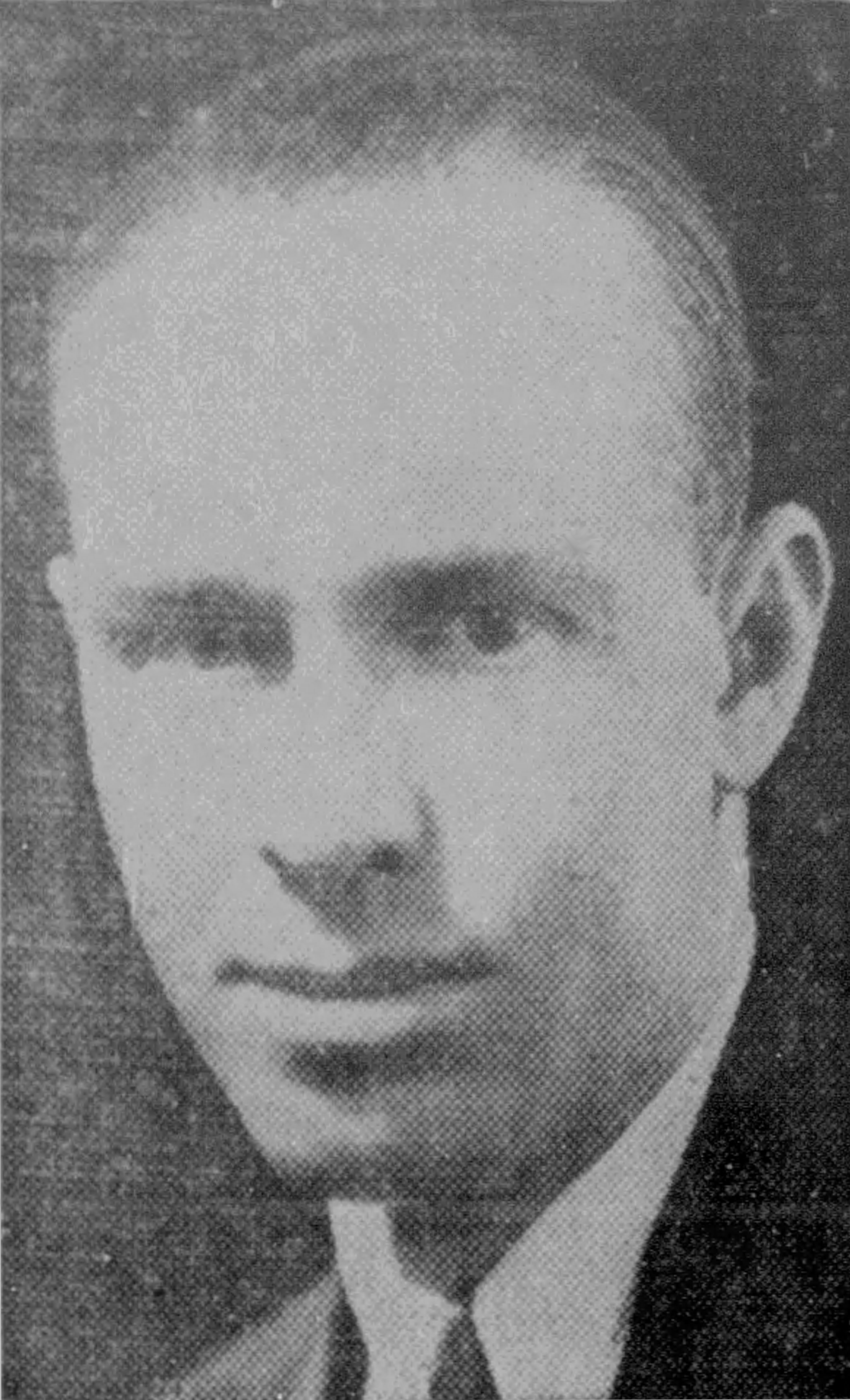

Member of the U.S. House of Representatives from Wyoming's at-large district
- In office January 3, 1941 – January 3, 1943
- Preceded by: Frank O. Horton
- Succeeded by: Frank A. Barrett

Auditor of Wyoming
- In office 1944–1946
- Governor: Lester C. Hunt
- Preceded by: Carl Robinson
- Succeeded by: Everett T. Copenhaver

Personal details
- Born: December 17, 1904 Dewey County, Oklahoma, US
- Died: November 30, 1974 (aged 69) Cheyenne, Wyoming, US
- Party: Democratic
- Education: University of Colorado Boulder

John Joseph McIntyre (December 17, 1904 – November 30, 1974) was a lawyer, politician, United States representative from Wyoming and a justice of the Wyoming Supreme Court.

== Early years ==
McIntyre was born on a farm in Dewey County, Oklahoma, attended grade schools at Ramona, Oklahoma, and graduated from the high school at Tulsa, and from the law department of the University of Colorado at Boulder in 1928.

== Legal career ==
He was admitted to the bar in 1929 and commenced practice in Glenrock, Wyoming. He moved to Douglas, Wyoming in 1931 and continued the practice of law. He served as county and prosecuting attorney of Converse County from 1933 to 1936 and was special attorney for the United States Department of Justice at Washington, D.C. from 1936 to 1938. He was an associate attorney in the solicitor's office of the United States Department of Agriculture in Washington, 1938. He was a member of the Wyoming National Guard with the rank of captain from 1935 to 1941.

== Politics ==
McIntyre was elected as a member of the Democratic party to the 77th Congress, serving from January 3, 1941, to January 3, 1943. He was an unsuccessful candidate for reelection in 1942 to the 78th Congress. He was deputy attorney general of Wyoming in 1943 and 1944, and served as a staff sergeant in Headquarters Battery, Six Hundred and Sixtieth Field Artillery, from February 9, 1944, to August 22, 1945; he was decorated with the French Croix de Guerre. He was State auditor for Wyoming in 1946, and was an unsuccessful candidate for election in 1946 to the 80th Congress. He was Democratic nominee for Governor in 1950, and was elected in 1960 as a justice of the Wyoming Supreme Court for a four-year term; he was reelected in 1964 and served continuously until his death, November 30, 1974, in Cheyenne. Interment was in Memorial Gardens.

Party political offices
Preceded by Lester C. Hunt	Democratic nominee for Governor of Wyoming; 1950	Succeeded by William M. Jack
U.S. House of Representatives
Preceded by Frank O. Horton	Member of the U.S. House of Representatives from Wyoming's at-large congressional district January 3, 1941 – January 3, 1943	Succeeded by Frank A. Barrett
Preceded by Carl Robinson	Wyoming State Auditor; 1944-1947	Succeeded by Everett T. Copenhaver
