= Arthur G. Crane =

American politician (1877–1955)

Arthur Griswold Crane
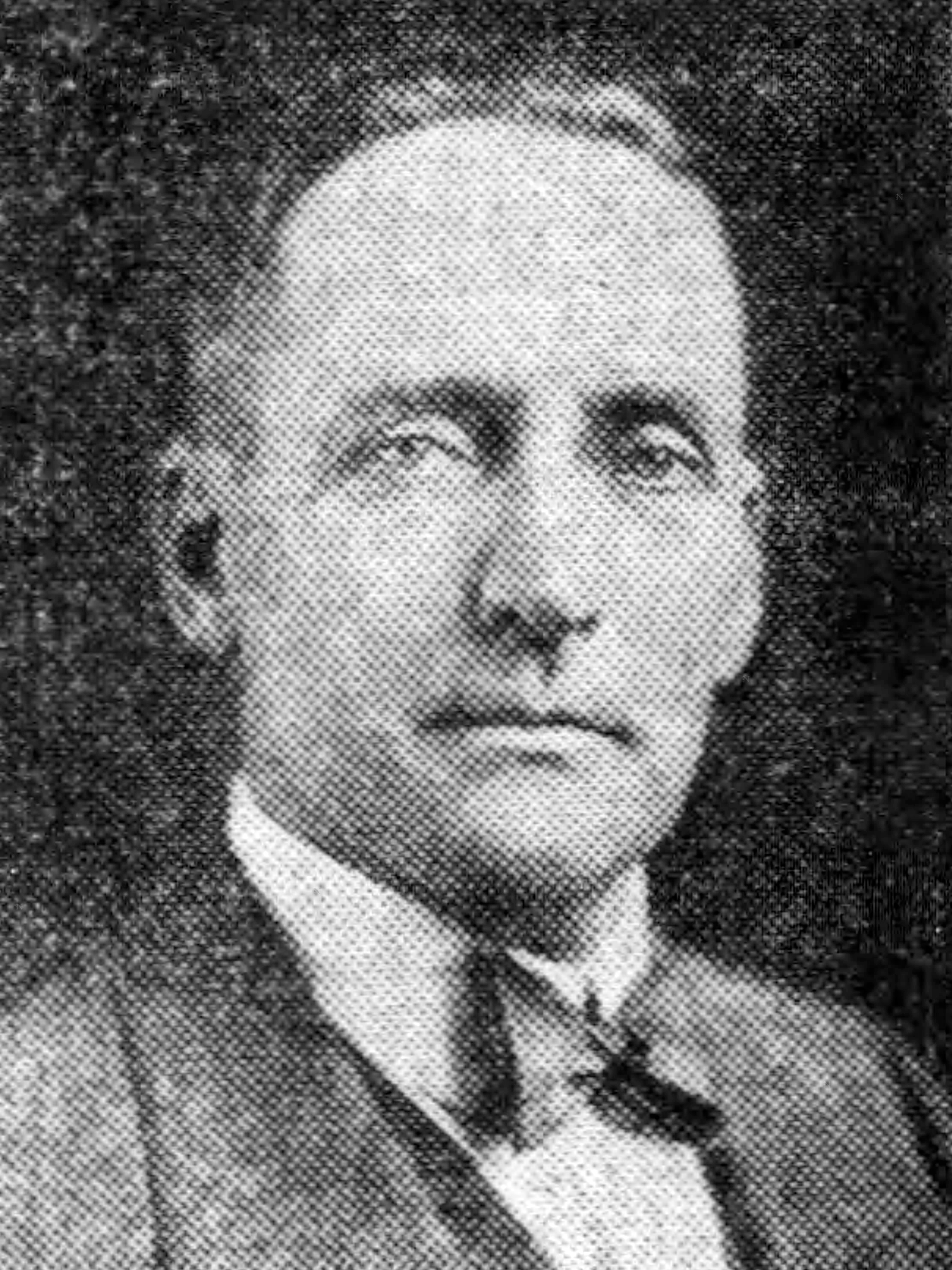

20th Governor of Wyoming
- In office January 3, 1949 – January 1, 1951
- Preceded by: Lester C. Hunt
- Succeeded by: Frank A. Barrett

12th Secretary of State of Wyoming
- In office January 6, 1947 – January 1, 1951
- Governor: Lester C. Hunt; Himself
- Preceded by: William M. Jack
- Succeeded by: C.J. "Doc" Rogers

Personal details
- Born: September 1, 1877 Davenport, New York, U.S.
- Died: August 11, 1955 (aged 77) Cheyenne, Wyoming, U.S.
- Party: Republican
- Spouse: Lura May DeArment

Arthur Griswold Crane (September 1, 1877 – August 11, 1955) was an American teacher and politician who served as the 20th governor of Wyoming from 1949 to 1951.

Born in New York City, Crane attended Carleton College and Teachers College, Columbia University, earning his PhD in 1920 from Columbia University. He served as the first President of Minot State University, and served in World War I during that time. Then he moved on to be President of the University of Wyoming from 1922 to 1941. He was elected Secretary of State in Wyoming in 1946, and when Lester C. Hunt resigned as Governor of Wyoming on January 3, 1949, Crane stepped up to take his place until Frank A. Barrett was elected in 1950. During his brief tenure, Crane supported construction of the Wyoming Home and Hospital for the Aged.

After retiring from politics, Crane returned to his roots, remaining active in the field of education. He died in Cheyenne in 1955.

Political offices
Preceded by William "Scotty" Jack	Secretary of State of Wyoming; 1947-1951	Succeeded by C.J. "Doc" Rogers
Preceded by Lester C. Hunt	Governor of Wyoming; January 3, 1949 – January 1, 1951	Succeeded by Frank A. Barrett
