= Clifford Joy Rogers =

American politician (1897–1962)

Clifford "Doc" Rogers

22nd Governor of Wyoming
- In office January 3, 1953 – January 3, 1955
- Preceded by: Frank A. Barrett
- Succeeded by: Milward Simpson

13th Secretary of State of Wyoming
- In office January 1, 1951 – January 3, 1955
- Governor: Frank A. Barrett; Himself
- Preceded by: Arthur G. Crane
- Succeeded by: Everett T. Copenhaver

15th & 19th Treasurer of Wyoming
- In office January 6, 1947 – January 1, 1951
- Governor: Lester C. Hunt; Arthur G. Crane
- Preceded by: Earl Wright
- Succeeded by: J.R. Mitchell
- In office 1959-1962
- Governor: John J. Hickey; Jack R. Gage
- Preceded by: Charles B. Morgan
- Succeeded by: Richard J. Luman

Personal details
- Born: December 20, 1897 Clarion, Iowa, U.S.
- Died: May 18, 1962 (aged 64)
- Party: Republican

Clifford Joy "Doc" Rogers (December 20, 1897 – May 18, 1962) was an American politician who served as the 22nd governor of Wyoming from January 3, 1953 until January 3, 1955. He was a Republican Rogers also served as State Treasurer of Wyoming twice (1946-1950, 1958-1962). As secretary of state, he succeeded to the Wyoming governorship when Governor Frank A. Barrett resigned in 1953 to join the United States Senate. Seeking a full term, Rogers lost in the 1954 Republican primary to Milward Simpson. Rogers was born in Clarion, Iowa.

== See also ==
- List of governors of Wyoming

Political offices
Preceded by Arthur G. Crane	Secretary of State of Wyoming; 1951-1955	Succeeded by Everett T. Copenhaver
Preceded by Frank A. Barrett	Governor of Wyoming; January 3, 1953 – January 3, 1955	Succeeded by Milward L. Simpson
