= Lester C. Hunt =

American politician (1892–1954)

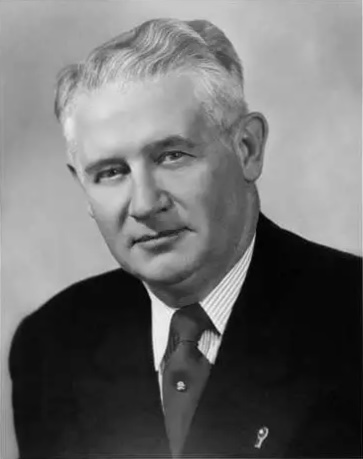

United States Senator from Wyoming
- In office January 3, 1949 – June 19, 1954
- Preceded by: Edward V. Robertson
- Succeeded by: Edward D. Crippa

Chair of the National Governors Association
- In office June 13, 1948 – January 3, 1949
- Preceded by: Horace Hildreth
- Succeeded by: William Preston Lane Jr.

19th Governor of Wyoming
- In office January 4, 1943 – January 3, 1949
- Preceded by: Nels H. Smith
- Succeeded by: Arthur G. Crane

9th Secretary of State of Wyoming
- In office January 7, 1935 – January 4, 1943
- Governor: Leslie A. Miller; Nels H. Smith
- Preceded by: Alonzo M. Clark
- Succeeded by: Mart Christensen

Personal details
- Born: Lester Callaway Hunt; July 8, 1892 Isabel, Illinois, U.S.
- Died: June 19, 1954 (aged 61) Washington, D.C., U.S.
- Party: Democratic
- Spouse: Nathelle Higby (m. 1920)
- Children: 2
- Education: Illinois Wesleyan University (attended); St. Louis University (DDS)

Military service
- Allegiance: United States
- Branch/service: United States Army
- Years of service: 1917–1919 (Active); 1919–1954 (Reserve)
- Rank: First Lieutenant (Active); Major (Reserve)
- Unit: United States Army Dental Corps
- Battles/wars: World War I

Lester Callaway Hunt, Sr. (July 8, 1892 – June 19, 1954), was an American Democratic politician from the state of Wyoming. Hunt was the first to be elected to two consecutive terms as Wyoming's governor, serving as its 19th governor from January 4, 1943, to January 3, 1949. In 1948, he was elected by a decisive margin to the U.S. Senate, and began his term on January 3, 1949.

Hunt supported a number of federal social programs and advocated for federal support of low-cost health and dental insurance policies. He also supported a variety of programs proposed by the Eisenhower administration following the Republican landslide in the 1952 elections, including the abolition of racial segregation in the District of Columbia, and the expansion of Social Security.

An outspoken opponent of Senator Joseph McCarthy's anti-Communist campaign, Hunt challenged McCarthy and his senatorial allies by championing a proposed law restricting Congressional immunity and allowing individuals to sue members of Congress for slanderous statements. In June 1953, Hunt's son was arrested in Washington, D.C., on charges of soliciting sex from an undercover male police officer (homosexual acts were prohibited by law at the time). Some Republican senators, including McCarthy, threatened Hunt with prosecution of his son and wide publication of the event unless he abandoned plans to run for re-election and resigned immediately, which Hunt refused to do. His son was convicted and fined on October 6, 1953. On April 15, 1954, Hunt announced his intention to run for re-election. He changed his mind, however, after McCarthy renewed the threat to use his son's arrest against him. On June 19, Hunt died by suicide in his Senate office; his death dealt a serious blow to McCarthy's image and was one of the factors that led to his censure by the Senate later in 1954.

== Early years ==
Lester C. Hunt was born in Isabel, Illinois on July 8, 1892, a son of William Hunt and Viola (Callaway) Hunt. He was raised in Atlanta, Illinois, and graduated from Atlanta's high school in 1912. Hunt played semi-professional baseball in Illinois, and visited Wyoming for the first time at age 19, when he joined a team in Lander.

Hunt attended Illinois Wesleyan University from 1912 to 1913, where he was a member of Tau Kappa Epsilon fraternity, and then worked as a railroad switchman to put himself through dental school at Saint Louis University. After graduating with a DDS degree in 1917, he moved to Lander to establish a practice. He joined the United States Army Dental Corps when the United States entered World War I, and served as a lieutenant from 1917 to 1919. After postgraduate study at Northwestern University in 1920, Hunt resumed his practice in Lander. He was president of the Wyoming State Dental Society and began his career in government when appointed as president of the Wyoming State Board of Dental Examiners, serving from 1924 to 1928.

== Political career ==
=== State representative and Secretary of State ===
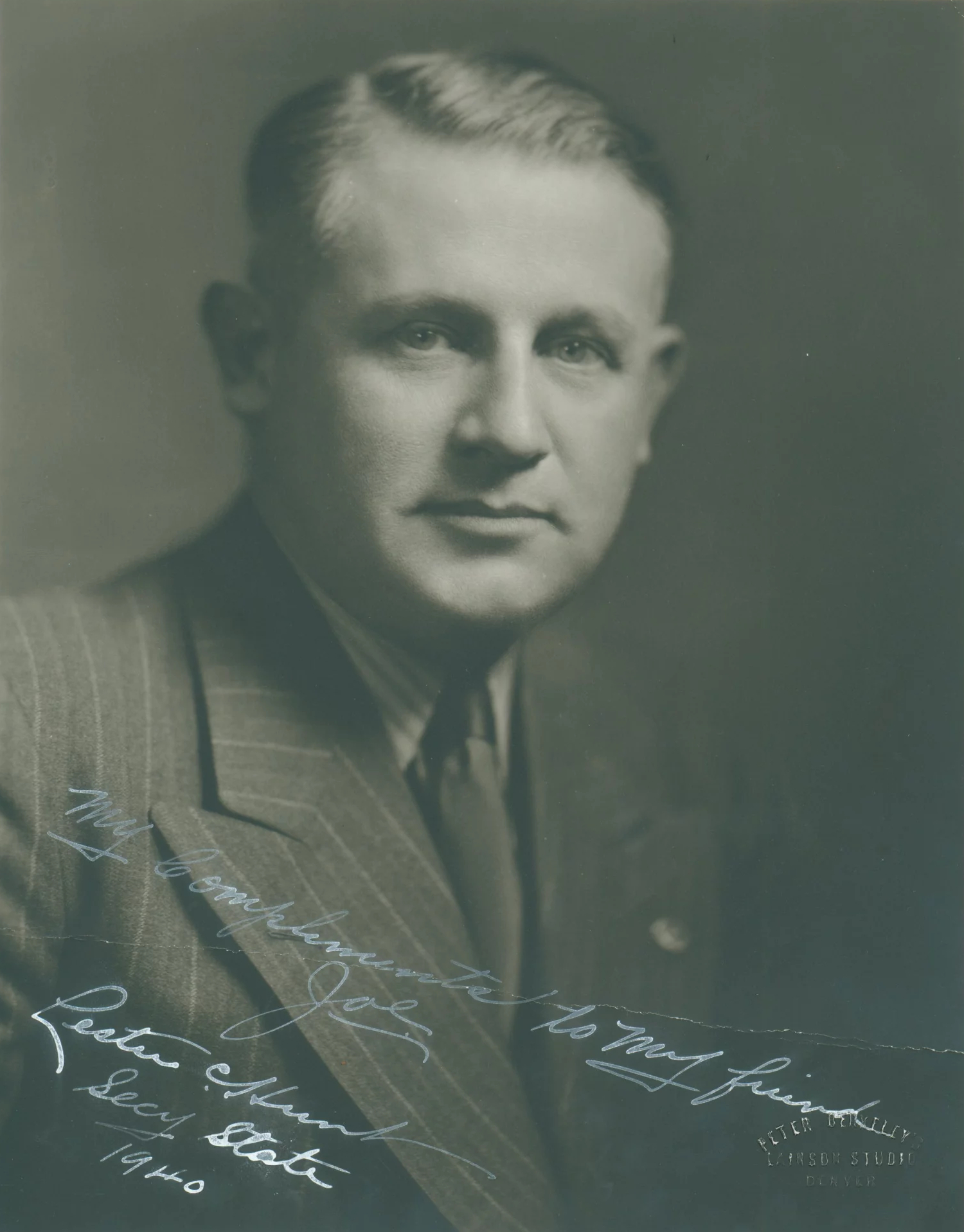
Portrait by Peter Berkeley, 1940

Hunt was elected in 1933 to the Wyoming House of Representatives from Fremont County. He sponsored eugenics legislation that would have permitted the sterilization of inmates at Wyoming institutions if "afflicted with insanity, idiocy, imbecility, feeblemindedness, or epilepsy". The legislation, though similar to that enacted in several neighboring states in the 1920s, failed, and he later stated that he regretted sponsoring it. He was elected as Wyoming Secretary of State in 1934 and 1938, serving from 1935 to 1943. In 1935, he commissioned muralist Allen Tupper True to design the Bucking Horse and Rider that has appeared on Wyoming license plates since 1936. While serving as Secretary of State, Hunt personally claimed the copyright of the Wyoming Guidebook, a Work Projects Administration publication, after the Governor and legislature failed to act to preserve the bucking horse and rider design as the state's intellectual property. The book proved popular, and there were questions as to whether Hunt benefited personally from its sales. He was able to demonstrate that he had endorsed all quarterly royalty checks and turned them over to the state treasurer, and he transferred the copyright to the State of Wyoming in 1942.

=== Governor of Wyoming ===
Hunt was governor of Wyoming, from 1943 to 1949. He faced hostile majorities in both houses of the legislature throughout his years as governor. The principal legislative accomplishment of his first term was the enactment of a retirement system for teachers. He repeatedly proposed a retirement system for state workers in his second term without success. During his first term, Republican U.S. Senator Edward V. Robertson charged that the Japanese citizens interned at Heart Mountain, Wyoming, were leading pampered lives and hoarding supplies. The Denver Post wrote an exposé backing his complaints. Hunt dismissed that as a "political story" and said that "food stuffs cannot be brought into a city to feed 13,500 people in a wheel barrow and it would not be good business to bring it in every day." He toured the camp and said the internees' "living standard was, to my way of thinking, rather disgraceful." At the end of the war, he wrote to the War Relocation Authority that "We do not want a single one of these evacuees to remain in Wyoming."

When President Roosevelt issued an executive order on March 16, 1943, creating Jackson Hole National Monument, Hunt joined in mobilizing opposition and said he would use state police to remove any federal official who tried to exert authority in the Monument's lands. Congress refused to fund the Monument until 1950, when Wyoming's two U.S. Senators, Joseph C. O'Mahoney and Hunt, reached a compromise with the Truman administration. It merged most of the Monument's lands into Grand Teton National Park, provided compensation for lost revenue, and protected local property owners.

Hunt was a Wyoming delegate to the Democratic National Convention in 1940, 1944, and 1948. He chaired the National Governors Association in 1948. His official gubernatorial portrait was painted by artist Michele Rushworth and hangs in the state capitol building in Cheyenne, Wyoming.

=== United States Senator ===
Hunt was elected to the U.S. Senate in 1948 to a term beginning January 3, 1949, defeating incumbent Republican E.V. Robertson by a comfortable margin. His political positions combined fiscal conservatism and opposition to big government with support for public housing and increased federal aid to education. During his tenure in the Senate, Hunt became a bitter enemy of Wisconsin senator Joseph R. McCarthy, and his criticism of McCarthy's tactics marked him as a prime target in the 1954 election. For example, he campaigned for a law to restrict Congressional immunity by allowing individuals to sue members of Congress for slanderous statements. He called for reform of Senate rules: "If situations confront the Congress in which it can no longer control its members by the rules of society, justice and fair play, then Congress has, I feel, a moral obligation to take drastic steps to remedy those situations."

In 1949, he recommended that the American Medical Association (AMA) and the American Dental Association (ADA) consider endorsing a plan for the federal government to offer health insurance policies with low deductibles to cover "medical, surgical, hospital, laboratory, nursing and dental services." He told an ADA convention:

We cannot preserve the freedom of the practice of dentistry and medicine, we cannot keep dentistry and medicine uncontrolled and unregimented by the Federal Government, we cannot maintain our American free and independent practice in the health services by simply denouncing socialization or by a stand-pat opposition.

He served on the Senate Crime Investigating Committee (known as the Kefauver Committee) and the Senate Armed Services Committee. He backed foreign aid programs and supported a call for disarmament designed to demonstrate that Russia's peace proposals were not serious.

Following Dwight Eisenhower's landslide victory in the 1952 election, Hunt announced that he felt obliged to support the administration's legislative proposals wherever possible. He cited complete agreement with plans for agricultural subsidies, the expansion of Social Security, the creation of a Fair Employment Practices Commission, and the abolition of segregation in the District of Columbia.

== Son's arrest and Hunt's suicide ==
On June 9, 1953, Hunt's 25-year-old son Lester Jr., known as "Buddy", who was a student and president of the student body at the Episcopal Theological School in Cambridge, Massachusetts, (Note: Buddy (September 5, 1927 – January 6, 2020) attended the University of Wyoming and then transferred to Swarthmore College, graduating in 1949. His politics were more liberal than his father's and he had participated in campaigns against McCarthyism and in support of academic freedom. Commenting on his arrest in 1989, he said, "I wasn't framed. I guess technically it was entrapment, but I was ready for the trap.") was arrested in Washington, D.C., for soliciting sex from a male undercover police officer in Lafayette Square, just north of and adjacent to the White House property. It was his first offense, which police normally handled quietly as a matter for the offender's family to address, but the arrest became known to Senate Republicans. According to Drew Pearson's "Washington Merry-Go-Round" column published after Hunt's death, Senators Styles Bridges and Herman Welker threatened that if Hunt did not immediately retire from the Senate and agree not to seek his seat in the 1954 election, they would see that his son was prosecuted and would widely publicize his son's arrest.

In a closely divided Senate, Hunt's resignation would have allowed Wyoming's Republican governor to appoint a Republican to fill the remainder of Hunt's term and to run as an incumbent in the 1954 election, possibly affecting the balance of power in the Senate in favor of Republicans. Hunt refused, and in response, Republican Senators threatened Inspector Roy Blick of the Morals Division of the Washington Police Department with the loss of his job for failing to prosecute Buddy Hunt. Buddy Hunt was prosecuted, and Senator Hunt attended the trial. On October 7, 1953, Buddy Hunt paid a fine for soliciting a plainclothes policeman "for lewd and immoral purposes", and on the same day, The Washington Post published the story. Buddy Hunt's attorney was quoted in an October 8 New York Times account as saying his client preferred "to avoid any further publicity." Aside from these brief media accounts, the arrest and prosecution of Buddy Hunt was not widely publicized at the time.

In December 1953, Hunt told journalist Pearson that he would not stand for re-election if the opposition used his son's arrest against him, fearing that the publicity would have a negative effect on his wife's health. Despite the threats of publicity from his political opponents, including a specific threat to distribute in Wyoming 25,000 leaflets about his son's arrest, Hunt did announce on April 15, 1954, that he would be a candidate for re-election. A poll taken on April 5, 1954, gave Hunt 54.5% support, with his nearest opponent at 19.3%.

In May 1954, as a member of the Senate's "liberal bloc", he proposed rules for Senate committees designed to eliminate some of McCarthy's tactics. Later that month, Bridges renewed his threat to publicize Hunt Jr.'s offense to Wyoming voters. The Eisenhower administration, taking a different tack, offered Hunt a high-paying position on the U.S. Tariff Commission if he agreed never to run for the Senate again. On June 8, following a medical examination at Bethesda Naval Hospital, Hunt changed his mind about running again, and wrote to the chair of the Wyoming Democratic party, citing health concerns as the reason: "I shall never again be a candidate for an elective office." He did not, however, resign from the Senate.

On June 19, 1954, Hunt shot himself at his desk in his Senate office, using a .22 caliber rifle he apparently brought from home. He was taken to Casualty Hospital, where he died a few hours later at age 61. The New York Times reported that he acted "in apparent despondency over his health" and left four sealed notes.

Just one day before Hunt's suicide, McCarthy had accused an unnamed member of the Senate of "just plain wrong doing". After Hunt's suicide, McCarthy's ally Senator Karl Mundt of South Dakota denied that McCarthy was referring to Hunt.

=== Aftermath ===
The day after Hunt's suicide, Pearson published his charges about how Republican Senators had threatened Hunt, but described Hunt's motives as complex:

Two weeks ago he went to the hospital for a physical check and announced that he would not run again. It was no secret that he had been having kidney trouble for some time, but I am sure that on top of this, Lester Hunt, a much more sensitive soul than his colleagues realized, just could not bear the thought of having his son's misfortunes become the subject of whispers in his re-election campaign.

In private, he confirmed that Hunt had no serious health problem and wrote in his diary that "Unfortunately I am afraid that the morals charge against his son and the experience Hunt suffered was the main factor."

Hunt was buried on June 22 in Cheyenne at Beth El Cemetery following a brief church service. At the time of his death, Hunt was a major in the Army Reserve Corps.

On June 24, acting Wyoming Governor C.J. Rogers appointed Republican Edward D. Crippa to fill the remainder of Hunt's Senate term, which expired in January. On July 4, the conservative Washington Times-Herald reported Buddy Hunt's arrest and conviction from the previous year, with Hunt's death giving the story wider circulation than it had previously received.

On July 9, Blick signed an affidavit exonerating Bridges and Welker of pressuring him, but his decision to prosecute Buddy Hunt under circumstances which did not normally warrant prosecution remained unexplained. On November 9, the Senate eulogized its members who had died recently and Bridges called Hunt "a man who demonstrated the best qualities of an American. He was loyal and he served well". Hunt's cousin, William M. Spencer, president of the North American Car Corporation in Chicago, wrote Welker after learning he had eulogized Hunt:

I was shocked when I read this. It recalled to my mind so vividly the conversation with Senator Hunt a few weeks before he died, wherein he recited in great detail the diabolical part you played following the unfortunate and widely publicized episode in which his son was involved. Senator Hunt, a close personal friend of mine, told me without reservation the details of the tactics you used in endeavoring to induce him to withdraw from the Senate, or at least not to be a candidate again. It seems apparent that you took every advantage of the misery which the poor fellow was suffering at the time in your endeavor to turn it to political advantage. Such procedure is as low a blow as could be conceived. I understood, too, from Senator Hunt, that Senator Bridges had been consulted by you and approved of your action in the matter.

Democrat Joseph C. O'Mahoney won Hunt's Senate seat in the election on November 2, defeating the Republican nominee, Congressman William Henry Harrison III.

Buddy Hunt later worked on the staff of Catholic Charities in Chicago and then for the Industrial Areas Foundation of Chicago. With his co-worker there, Nicholas von Hoffman, he co-authored a paper, "The Meanings of 'Democracy': Puerto Rican Organizations in Chicago", that appeared in ETC: A Review of General Semantics, an academic journal of linguistics in 1956. In October 2015, Buddy completed his first on-camera interview about his arrest and his father's suicide, for the Yahoo News documentary “Uniquely Nasty: The U.S. Government’s War on Gays.” Buddy Hunt died in Chicago on January 6, 2020, at the age of 92.

== Later references ==
Allen Drury, a journalist who covered the U.S. Senate for United Press International, used Hunt's blackmail and suicide as the basis for his 1959 best-selling and Pulitzer Prize–winning novel Advise and Consent. In the novel, Senator Fred Van Ackerman from Wyoming uses a homosexual affair to blackmail Utah Senator Brigham Anderson. In 1962, the novel was made into a movie starring Henry Fonda and directed by Otto Preminger.

University of Wyoming historian T.A. Larson, author of a history of the state, wrote an account of Hunt's suicide and submitted it to Hunt's widow Nathelle, seeking her permission to publish it. Instead she threatened him with a lawsuit and he never published the results of his research.

Hunt's anti-McCarthyism and his son's arrest appear in fictionalized form in Thomas Mallon's Fellow Travelers (2007), a novel that describes a young man's introduction to hardball Washington politics in the 1950s as he discovers his gay identity. It is included as well in the 2023 television miniseries based on the novel.

In 2013, at a mock trial of Hunt's Senate colleagues McCarthy, Welker, and Bridges, all three were "found guilty of a variety of charges, including blackmail and causing bodily injury". Former Wyoming Governor Dave Freudenthal, who played the prosecuting attorney in the Cheyenne event, said: "This particular part of Wyoming history had been swept under the rug. So I'm really delighted to participate in drawing attention to it." The event was organized to coincide with the publication of a new study of Hunt's death, Dying for Joe McCarthy's Sins by Rodger McDaniel, a Presbyterian pastor, former Wyoming legislator (1971–1981), and Democratic candidate for the U.S. Senate in 1982. He used some of Larson's research.

== See also ==
- List of members of the United States Congress who died in office (1950–1999)
- Lavender Scare
- R. Budd Dwyer
- Vince Foster
- Robert M. La Follette Jr

== Additional sources ==
- United States Congress. "Lester C. Hunt (id: H000975)". Biographical Directory of the United States Congress.

Political offices
Preceded by Alonzo M. Clark	Secretary of State of Wyoming; 1935–1943	Succeeded by Mart Christensen
Preceded by Nels H. Smith	Governor of Wyoming; 1943–1949	Succeeded by Arthur G. Crane
Preceded by Horace Hildreth	Chair of the National Governors Association; 1948–1949	Succeeded by William Preston Lane Jr.
Party political offices
Preceded by Leslie A. Miller	Democratic nominee for Governor of Wyoming; 1942, 1946	Succeeded by John McIntyre
Preceded by Henry H. Schwartz	Democratic nominee for U.S. Senator from Wyoming (Class 2); 1948	Succeeded by Joseph C. O'Mahoney
U.S. Senate
Preceded by Edward V. Robertson	United States Senator (Class 2) from Wyoming; 1949–1954; Served alongside: Joseph C. O'Mahoney, Frank A. Barrett	Succeeded by Edward D. Crippa
