= List of elections in 1958 =

The following elections occurred in the year 1958.

== Africa ==
- 1958 South African general election
- 1958 Southern Rhodesian general election
- 1958 Sudanese parliamentary election
- 1958–1959 Tanganyikan general election
- 1958 Ugandan general election

== Asia ==
- 1958 Cambodian general election
- 1958 Iraqi parliamentary election
- 1958 Laotian parliamentary election
- 1958 Malayan local elections
- 1958 Sikkimese general election
- 1958 Singapore City Council by-election
- 1958 South Korean legislative election
- 1958 Soviet Union legislative election
- 1958 Japanese general election
- 1958 Lebanese presidential election
- 1958 Syrian United Arab Republic referendum

== Europe ==
- 1958 Danish local elections
- 1958 Hungarian parliamentary election
- 1958 East German general election
- 1958 Faroese general election
- 1958 Finnish parliamentary election
- 1958 French presidential election
- 1958 Greek legislative election
- 1958 Belgian general election
- 1958 Albanian parliamentary election
- 1958 Liechtenstein general election
- 1958 Monegasque general election
- 1958 Portuguese presidential election
- 1958 Soviet Union legislative election
- 1958 Swedish general election
- 1958 Swiss referendums
- 1958 Italian general election
- 1958 conclave
- 1958 Yugoslavian parliamentary election

=== France ===
- 1958 French constitutional referendum
- 1958 French legislative election

=== United Kingdom ===
- 1958 Argyll by-election
- 1958 Chichester by-election
- 1958 Ealing South by-election
- 1958 East Aberdeenshire by-election
- 1958 Glasgow Kelvingrove by-election
- 1958 Islington North by-election
- 1958 Morecambe and Lonsdale by-election
- 1958 Northern Ireland general election
- 1958 Pontypool by-election
- 1958 Rochdale by-election
- 1958 Shoreditch and Finsbury by-election
- 1958 St Helens by-election
- 1958 Torrington by-election
- 1958 Weston-super-Mare by-election

== North America ==
=== Canada ===
- 1958 Canadian federal election
- 1958 Edmonton municipal election
- 1958 Manitoba general election
- 1958 Ottawa municipal election
- 1958 Toronto municipal election
- 1958 Yukon general election
- 1958 New Brunswick Liberal Association leadership election

=== Caribbean ===
- 1958 Cuban general election
- 1958 Montserratian general election
- 1958 Netherlands Antilles general election
- 1958 West Indies federal elections

=== Mexico ===
- 1958 Mexican general election

=== United States ===
- 1958 United States elections

==== United States lieutenant gubernatorial ====
- 1958 California lieutenant gubernatorial election
- 1958 Connecticut lieutenant gubernatorial election
- 1958 Georgia lieutenant gubernatorial election
- 1958 Minnesota lieutenant gubernatorial election
- 1958 Nebraska lieutenant gubernatorial election
- 1958 Texas lieutenant gubernatorial election
- 1958 Wisconsin lieutenant gubernatorial election

==== United States gubernatorial ====
- 1958 Alabama gubernatorial election
- 1958 Alaska gubernatorial election
- 1958 Arizona gubernatorial election
- 1958 Arkansas gubernatorial election
- 1958 California gubernatorial election
- 1958 Colorado gubernatorial election
- 1958 Connecticut gubernatorial election
- 1958 Georgia gubernatorial election
- 1958 Idaho gubernatorial election
- 1958 Iowa gubernatorial election
- 1958 Kansas gubernatorial election
- 1958 Maine gubernatorial election
- 1958 Maryland gubernatorial election
- 1958 Massachusetts gubernatorial election
- 1958 Michigan gubernatorial election
- 1958 Minnesota gubernatorial election
- 1958 Nebraska gubernatorial election
- 1958 Nevada gubernatorial election
- 1958 New Hampshire gubernatorial election
- 1958 New Mexico gubernatorial election
- 1958 New York gubernatorial election
- 1958 North Dakota gubernatorial election
- 1958 Ohio gubernatorial election
- 1958 Oklahoma gubernatorial election
- 1958 Oregon gubernatorial election
- 1958 Pennsylvania gubernatorial election
- 1958 Rhode Island gubernatorial election
- 1958 South Carolina gubernatorial election
- 1958 South Dakota gubernatorial election
- 1958 Tennessee gubernatorial election
- 1958 Texas gubernatorial election
- 1958 United States gubernatorial elections
- 1958 Vermont gubernatorial election
- 1958 Wisconsin gubernatorial election
- 1958 Wyoming gubernatorial election

==== United States House of Representatives ====
- 1958 United States House of Representatives elections

==== United States Senate ====
- 1958 United States Senate elections
- 1958 United States Senate elections in Alaska
- 1958 United States Senate election in Arizona
- 1958 United States Senate election in California
- 1958 United States Senate election in Connecticut
- 1958 United States Senate election in Florida
- 1958 United States Senate election in Indiana
- 1958 United States Senate election in Maine
- 1958 United States Senate election in Maryland
- 1958 United States Senate election in Massachusetts
- 1958 United States Senate election in Michigan
- 1958 United States Senate election in Minnesota
- 1958 United States Senate election in Mississippi
- 1958 United States Senate election in Missouri
- 1958 United States Senate election in Montana
- 1958 United States Senate election in Nebraska
- 1958 United States Senate election in Nevada
- 1958 United States Senate election in New Jersey
- 1958 United States Senate election in New Mexico
- 1958 United States Senate election in New York
- 1958 United States Senate special election in North Carolina
- 1958 United States Senate election in North Dakota
- 1958 United States Senate election in Ohio
- 1958 United States Senate election in Pennsylvania
- 1958 United States Senate election in Rhode Island
- 1958 United States Senate election in Tennessee
- 1958 United States Senate election in Texas
- 1958 United States Senate election in Utah
- 1958 United States Senate election in Vermont
- 1958 United States Senate election in Virginia
- 1958 United States Senate election in Washington
- 1958 United States Senate election in West Virginia
- 1958 United States Senate special election in West Virginia
- 1958 United States Senate election in Wisconsin
- 1958 United States Senate election in Wyoming

==== United States mayoral elections ====
- 1958 New Orleans mayoral election

== South America ==
- 1958 Argentine general election
- 1958 Bolivian legislative election
- 1958 Brazilian legislative election
- 1958 Chilean presidential election
- 1958 Colombian parliamentary election
- 1958 Colombian presidential election
- 1958 Costa Rican general election
- 1958 Guatemalan general election
- 1958 Paraguayan general election
- 1958 Salvadoran legislative election
- 1958 Uruguayan constitutional referendum
- 1958 Uruguayan general election
- 1958 Venezuelan presidential election

== Oceania ==
=== Australia ===
- 1958 Australian federal election
- 1958 Flinders state by-election
- 1958 Parramatta by-election
- 1958 Victorian state election
