= 1976 United States Senate election in Wyoming =

- November 2, 1976
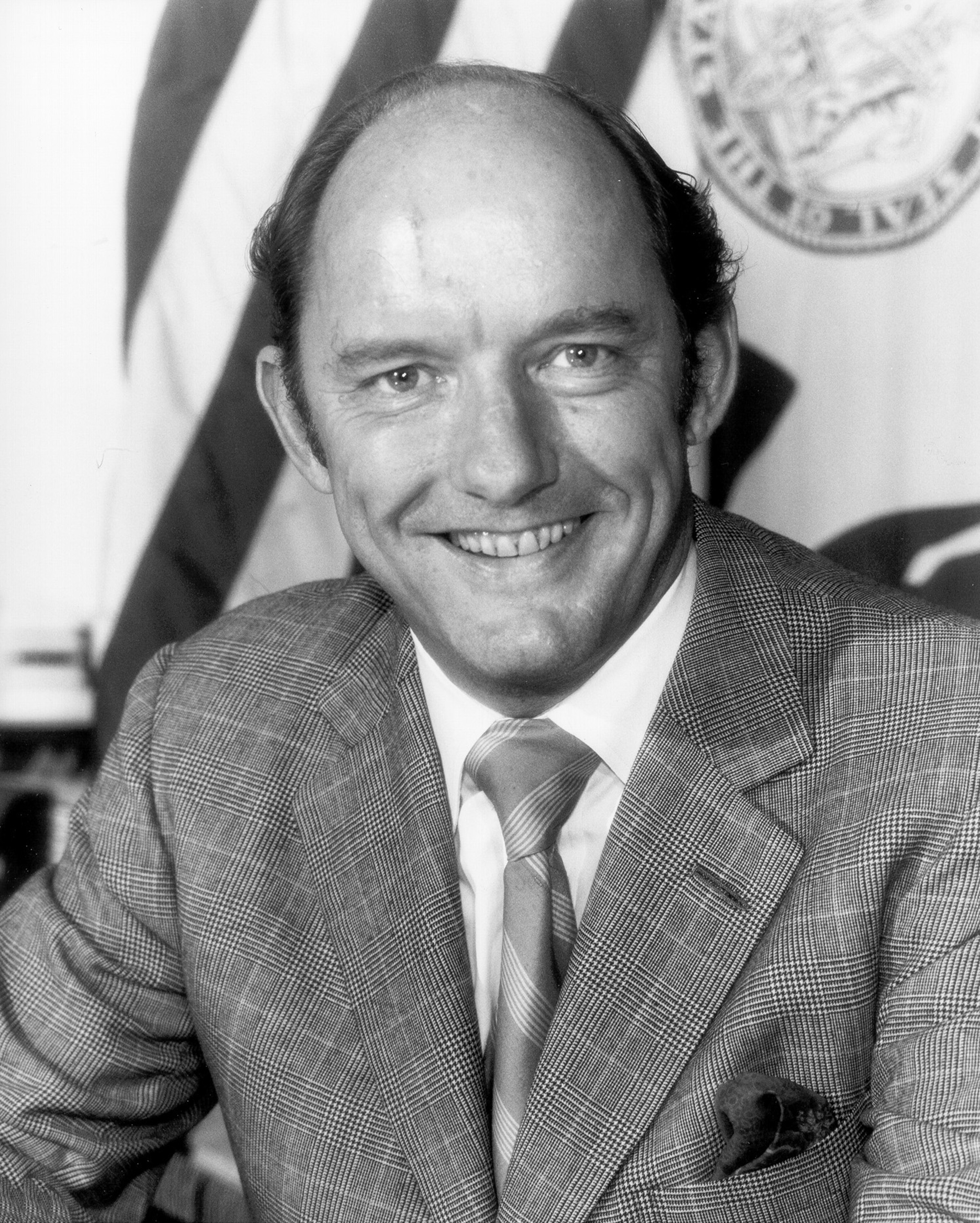

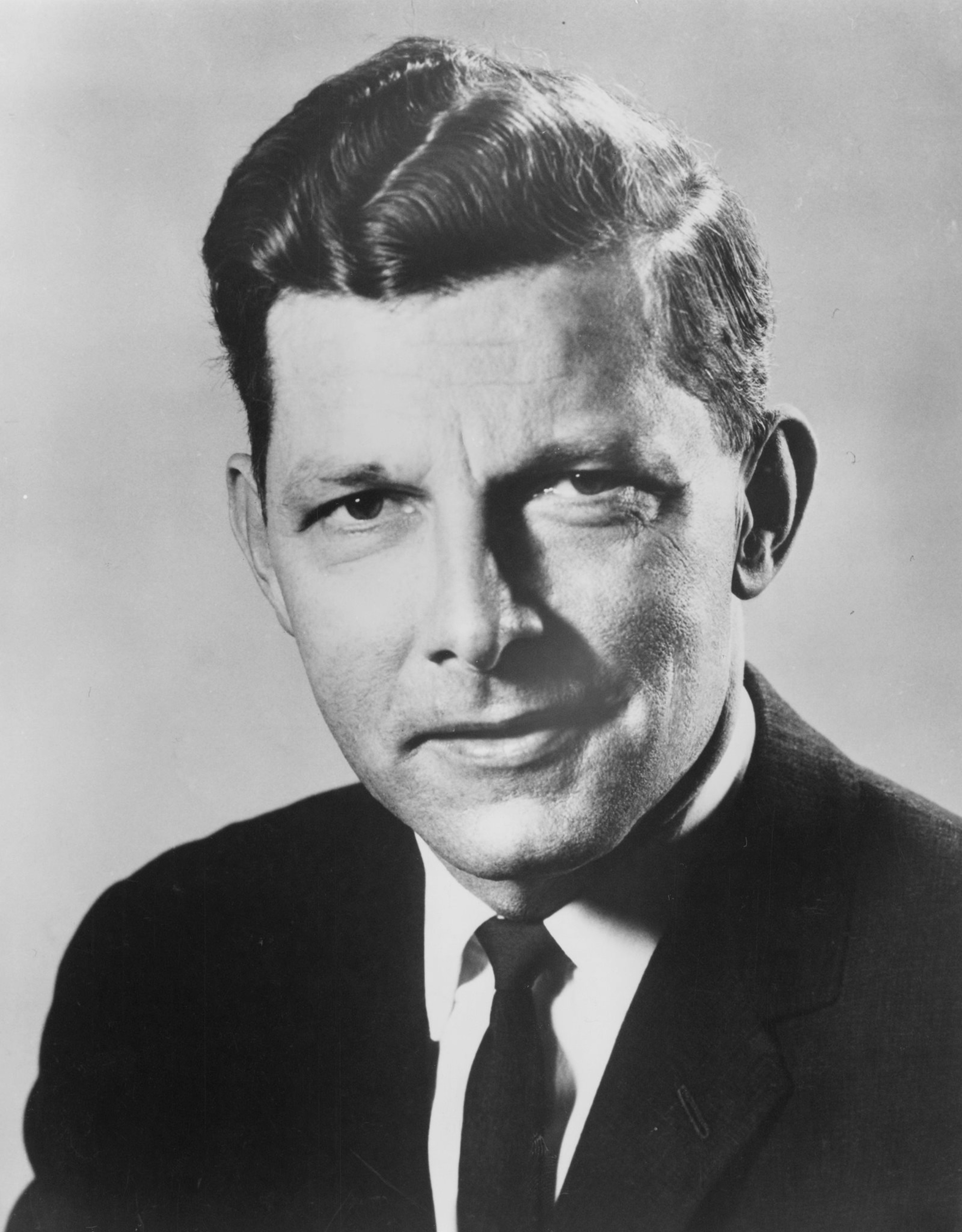
Nominee	Malcolm Wallop	Gale W. McGee
Party	Republican	Democratic
Popular vote	84,810	70,558
Percentage	54.59%	45.41%
- County results Wallop: 50–60% 60–70% 70–80% McGee: 50–60%
U.S. senator before election
Gale W. McGee
Democratic
Elected U.S. Senator
Malcolm Wallop
Republican

The 1976 United States Senate election in Wyoming took place on November 2, 1976. Incumbent Democratic Senator Gale W. McGee ran for re-election to his fourth term, facing a strong challenge from Republican State Senator Malcolm Wallop. Following a close win in his first race in 1958, McGee won wider victories in 1964 and 1970, even as the state's electorate grew more conservative.

Despite McGee's past victories in the state, he faced considerable headwinds as President Gerald Ford won the state over Jimmy Carter convincingly, even as Ford lost nationwide. In the end, despite McGee's ability to significantly outperform other Democratic candidates, he lost to Wallop, winning just 45% of the vote to Wallop's 55%. Since Wallop took office in 1977, Republicans have held both of Wyoming’s Senate seats, which they had not done since 1954. This is the last time that an incumbent Senator from Wyoming lost re-election.

== Democratic primary ==
=== Candidates ===
- Gale W. McGee, incumbent U.S. Senator

=== Results ===
Democratic primary
Party	Candidate	Votes	%
Democratic	Gale McGee (incumbent)	44,437	100.00%
Total votes		44,437	100.00%

== Republican primary ==
=== Candidates ===
- Malcolm Wallop, State Senator, 1974 Republican candidate for Governor
- Nels T. Larson
- Doyle Henry, perennial candidate

=== Results ===
Republican primary
Party	Candidate	Votes	%
Republican	Malcolm Wallop	41,445	76.56%
Republican	Nels T. Larson	6,965	12.87%
Republican	Doyle Henry	5,727	10.58%
Total votes		54,137	100.00%

== General election ==
=== Results ===
1976 United States Senate election in Wyoming
Party	Candidate	Votes	%	±%
Republican	Malcolm Wallop	84,810	54.59%	+10.37%
Democratic	Gale W. McGee (incumbent)	70,558	45.41%	−10.37%
Majority		14,252	9.17%	−2.39%
Turnout		155,368		
Republican gain from Democratic				
