= 1970 United States Senate election in Wyoming =

- November 3, 1970
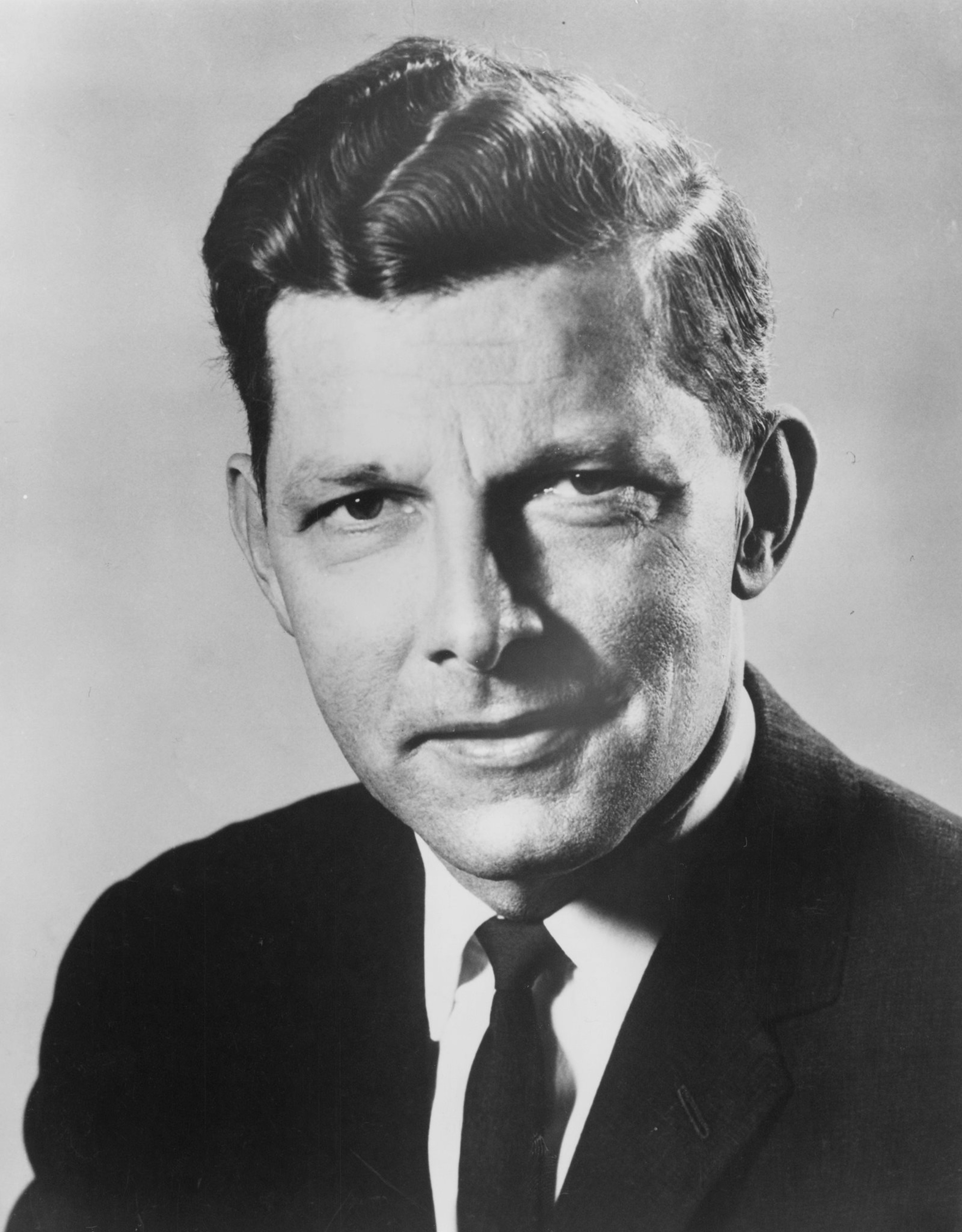

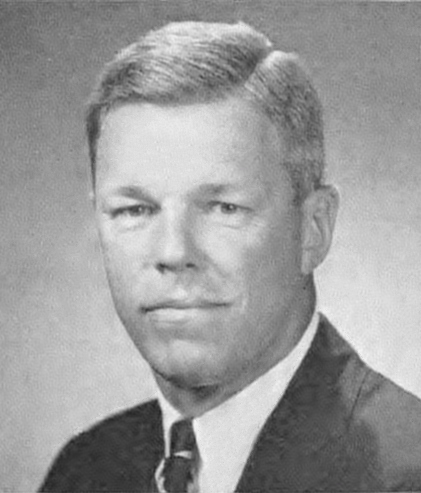
| Nominee | Gale W. McGee | John S. Wold |
| Party | Democratic | Republican |
| Popular vote | 67,207 | 53,279 |
| Percentage | 55.78% | 44.22% |
- County results McGee: 50–60% 60–70% Wold: 50–60% 60–70%
U.S. senator before election
Gale W. McGee
Democratic
Elected U.S. Senator
Gale W. McGee
Democratic

The 1970 United States Senate election in Wyoming took place on November 3, 1970. Incumbent Democratic Senator Gale W. McGee ran for re-election to his third term. In a rematch of the 1964 election, he once again faced Republican John S. Wold, who at this time represented Wyoming in the U.S. House of Representatives. 1970 proved to be a fairly strong year for Wyoming Republicans; Governor Stanley Hathaway was re-elected in a landslide and the party won all of the other statewide offices. However, McGee proved popular, and managed to increase his margin from 1964, beating Wold by a solid 56% to 44% margin.

As of the 2024 Senate election, this remains the last time that a Democratic candidate has won a United States Senate election in Wyoming; the state is tied with Utah for the longest Senate Republican winning streak.

== Democratic primary ==
=== Candidates ===
- Gale W. McGee, incumbent U.S. Senator
- Mike Svilar, State Senator

=== Campaign ===
As Senator Gale W. McGee faced a fierce challenge for re-election from Republican Congressman John S. Wold, he faced discontent in the Democratic Party over his continued support for the Vietnam War. In the spring of 1970, State Senator Mike Svilar announced that he could not support McGee for re-election, and noted that he was in conversation with several other anti-war Wyoming Democrats, including attorney John Mackey and mountaineer Paul Petzoldt, about challenging McGee in the Democratic primary. Ernest Wilkerson, a Casper attorney and the 1966 Democratic nominee for Governor, ruled out a challenge to McGee himself, but indicated his support for an anti-war primary challenger and held open the possibility that he could run as an independent candidate. In June, Svilar announced his candidacy, framing the contest as "a choice between war and peace," as he and McGee agreed on virtually all other issues. To support Svilar, a coalition of left-leaning Democrats in the mold of George McGovern, Eugene McCarthy, and Ted Kennedy, formed the New Democratic Coalition.

The campaign between McGee and Svilar quickly turned negative, with Svilar repeating his earlier pledge to not support McGee if he won the nomination. McGee threatened legal action against Svilar for claiming that McGee supported staying in Vietnam indefinitely, and Svilar refused to retract his allegation. As the campaign closed out, the state affiliate of the AFL–CIO sent a letter to its members claiming that "Svilar's purpose is not to win, but to stir up anti-McGee feeling that can be used in the general election ... to spoil the McGee chances," a charge that Svilar called "completely false and a desperate last-ditch, grasping at straws by Gale McGee's political machine as it sees itself about to collapse." Despite the tenacity of the campaign, however, polling close to the primary election showed the race largely uncompetitive; a Wyoming Stockman Farmer poll taken in early August showed McGee leading Svilar, 39-4%.

Ultimately, McGee defeated Svilar in a landslide, winning 80% of the vote to Svilar's 20%. Attorney Ernest Wilkerson, who had said that he would evaluate the possibility of an independent campaign against McGee depending on Svilar's performance, ultimately declined to do so. However, in the general election, Svilar refused to support McGee over Wold, though he did support the rest of the state Democratic ticket, and Paul Petzoldt, an anti-war opponent of McGee's in the Democratic Party, endorsed Wold over him.

=== Results ===
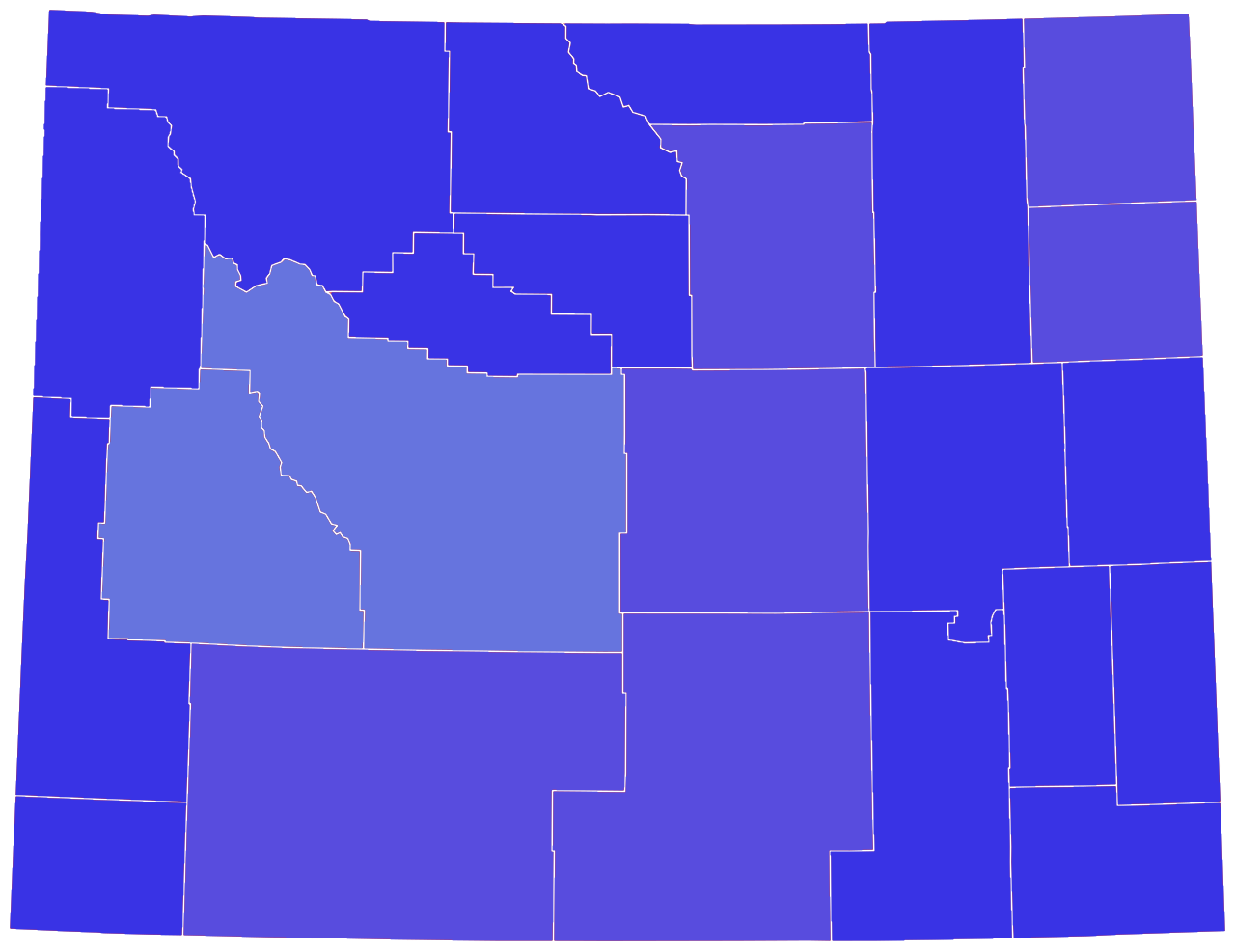
Results by county: McGee: 60–70%; 70–80%; 80–90%

Democratic primary
| Party | Candidate | Votes | % |
|---|---|---|---|
| Democratic | Gale McGee (incumbent) | 32,956 | 79.60% |
| Democratic | Mike Svilar | 8,448 | 20.40% |
| Total votes | | 41,404 | 100.00% |

== Republican primary ==
=== Candidates ===
- John S. Wold, U.S. Representative from Wyoming's at-large congressional district
- Arthur E. Linde, perennial candidate

=== Results ===
Republican primary
| Party | Candidate | Votes | % |
|---|---|---|---|
| Republican | John S. Wold | 40,276 | 88.03% |
| Republican | Arthur E. Linde | 5,479 | 11.97% |
| Total votes | | 45,755 | 100.00% |

== General election ==
=== Campaign ===
The general election campaign between McGee and Wold was fierce, with national Republicans targeting McGee for defeat. A small controversy developed over whether McGee falsely claimed the endorsement of the National Rifle Association of America, which prompted a member of the NRA Board of Directors to accuse McGee of "deceiving" voters. However, the Casper Star-Tribune issued a correction to its original reporting, noting that McGee did not claim the endorsement, but instead aloud read a complimentary letter from the NRA at a sportsmen meeting in Rock Springs, which some of the attendees took as an endorsement.

Polling of the race in October suggested a McGee victory, though depending on the source, they disagreed about how sizable; Wold's internal polling put McGee up just 51% to 48% on October 4, while independent polling from Casper television station KTWO put McGee up 56% to 44%, projecting an overall turnout of 140,000 votes. By late October, KTWO polling showed McGee widening his lead, beating Wold 57-43%.

In the end, McGee ended up defeating Wold by a wide margin, winning 56% of the vote to Wold's 44%, an increase from the 1964 campaign. McGee won by racking up large margins in the central and southern ancestrally Democratic counties of the state, through which the Union Pacific line ran, while Wold performed better in the more reliably Republican regions in the far north, east, and west.

=== Results ===
1964 United States Senate election in Wyoming
| Party | Candidate | Votes | % | ±% |
|---|---|---|---|---|
| Democratic | Gale W. McGee (incumbent) | 67,207 | 55.78% | +1.79% |
| Republican | John S. Wold | 53,279 | 44.22% | −1.79% |
| Majority | | 13,928 | 11.56% | +3.58% |
| Turnout | | 120,486 | | |
| Democratic hold | | | | |
