= 1958 New Brunswick Liberal Association leadership election =

- Date: October 11, 1958
- Convention: Fredericton, New Brunswick
- Resigning leader: Austin Claude Taylor
- Won by: Louis Robichaud
- Ballots: 3
- Candidates: 7

The New Brunswick Liberal Association held a leadership election on October 11, 1958, in Fredericton, New Brunswick, to elect a new leader for the party. The position was left vacant following former leader Austin Claude Taylor's appointment to the Senate of Canada in early 1957.

The leadership election saw seven total candidates in three ballots; during the first ballot, one was eliminated and three withdrew. Louis Robichaud won the overall election with 517 votes during the third ballot.

== Background ==
On January 4, 1957, then-New Brunswick Liberal Association leader Austin Claude Taylor was appointed to the Senate of Canada by Louis St. Laurent, representing Westmorland County; as a result, his provincial leadership position, which he had held since 1954, was made vacant. Joseph E. Connolly, a Liberal legislative member representing Gloucester, took on the role as house leader for the time being.

== Leadership convention ==
On September 14, 1958, the party called for a leadership convention to be held between October 10–11, 1958. It had already been determined that T. E. Duffie, a barrister from Victoria County, as well as George T. Urquhart, a defeated 1956 provincial election candidate from Saint John, were candidates. Other Liberal figures were also mentioned as potential candidates such as Connolly, Louis Robichaud, a legislative member for Kent and then-financial critic for the final legislative session, Henry Murphy, as well as party secretary David M. Dickson. Lester B. Pearson, the leader of the federal Liberal party, was to 'address the convention.'

=== Election results ===
The leadership election began on October 11, 1958. It was held in Fredericton for 883 Liberal delegates throughout the province to vote between seven candidates: Connolly, Duffie, Murphy, Robichaud, Urquhart, as well as Howard Hicks, a schoolteacher from Minto, as well as A. Wesley Stuart, a former parliamentarian for Charlotte who made a last-minute candidacy declaration.

The election results were publicized by newspapers on October 14, 1958. Robichaud emerged as the front-runner following the first ballot, which saw him receiving 239 votes. Stuart came in second place with 206, and Connolly received 176. Hicks was eliminated after receiving one vote; Murphy, Duffie, and Urquhart all withdrew after receiving 53, 61, and 87 votes, respectively. Robichaud led the second ballot with 403 votes, Stuart received 278, and Connolly was eliminated with 151 votes. Robichaud received the most votes again in the third and final ballot, receiving 517 votes versus Stuart's 304 votes. Robichaud secured the overall majority vote and was elected as the new party leader, of which he was considered as likely being "the youngest provincial party leader in Canada" at the time.

1958 NBLA leadership ballot (votes)
Candidate	First Ballot	Second Ballot	Third Ballot
Louis Robichaud	239	403	517
A. Wesley Stuart	206	278	304
Joseph E. Connolly	176	151	Eliminated
George T. Urquhart	87	Withdrawn	
T. E. Duffie	61	Withdrawn	
Henry J. Murphy	53	Withdrawn	
Howard Hicks	1	Eliminated	
