= John S. Wold =

American politician

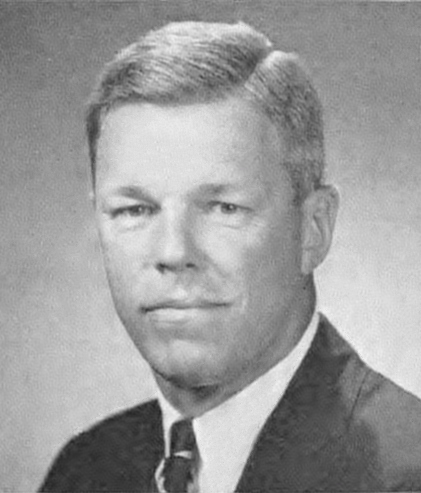

Member of the U.S. House of Representatives from Wyoming's at-large district
- In office January 3, 1969 – January 3, 1971
- Preceded by: William H. Harrison
- Succeeded by: Teno Roncalio

Personal details
- Born: John Schiller Wold; August 31, 1916 East Orange, New Jersey, U.S.
- Died: February 19, 2017 (aged 100) Casper, Wyoming, U.S.
- Party: Republican
- Spouse: Jane Wold (m. 1946; died 2015)
- Education: Union College, Cornell University

John Schiller Wold (August 31, 1916 – February 19, 2017) was an American business executive, philanthropist, World War II veteran, and Republican politician from Wyoming. He served a single term in the United States House of Representatives from 1969 to 1971. He was the first professional geologist to have served in Congress.

== Early life ==
John Wold was born on August 31, 1916, in East Orange, New Jersey. His father Peter Irving Wold was the chairman of the department of physics at Union College in Schenectady, New York. His father and five aunts had grown up in Eugene, Oregon and earned their degrees at the University of Oregon.

Wold graduated from Union College in Schenectady, New York in 1938 and Cornell University in 1939 with degrees in geology. During World War II, he served as a consulting physicist and gunnery officer for the U.S. Navy.

== Career ==
In 1949, he moved to Wyoming to work for an oil company and founded his own company, Wold Oil Properties, a year later. Wold founded Wold Oil Properties, Inc. in 1950 in Casper, Wyoming.

=== Early political career ===
He entered politics in 1956, winning a seat to the Wyoming House of Representatives. He served one term from 1957 to 1959 and was the state's Republican chairman from 1960 to 1964. In 1964, he ran for the U.S. Senate against freshman incumbent Democrat Gale McGee, who won by a 54% to 46% margin.

=== Congress ===
In 1968, he narrowly defeated on-again, off-again Congressman William Henry Harrison in the Republican primary before winning a decisive general election victory. Two years later, he gave up his House seat to run against incumbent Sen. Gale McGee again.He lost the race by 56% to 44% and returned to the private sector, but remained active as a Republican political donor.

== Philanthropy ==
In 2002, Wold made a $20 million donation to his alma mater, Union College. The donation was at the time the biggest single contribution in the university's history. The American Heritage Center at the University of Wyoming named Wold as the "Wyoming Citizen of the Century" in the minerals, gas, and oil category in 1999. He also contributed $2 million to Cornell University.

Wold and his eponymous foundation contributed $7.5 million to the Oregon Health & Science University's Casey Eye Institute in Portland, Oregon. The donation was dedicated to a new center with the mission of fighting the onset of adult blindness brought on by macular degeneration, a disease from which Wold had suffered for the last 20 years of his life.

== Death and legacy ==
John Wold died on February 19, 2017, in Casper at the age of 100. Wold Oil Company is now operated by his son, Peter. Another son, Jack, is chief executive officer of an energy company in Denver, Colorado.

Party political offices
Preceded by Frank A. Barrett	Republican nominee for U.S. Senator from Wyoming (Class 1); 1964, 1970	Succeeded by Malcolm Wallop
U.S. House of Representatives
Preceded by William Henry Harrison	Member of the U.S. House of Representatives from Wyoming's at-large congressional district 1969 – 1971	Succeeded by Teno Roncalio
Honorary titles
Preceded by Ken Hechler	Oldest living United States representative (Sitting or former); December 10, 2016 – February 19, 2017	Succeeded by James D. Martin
