= Gale W. McGee =

American politician (1915–1992)

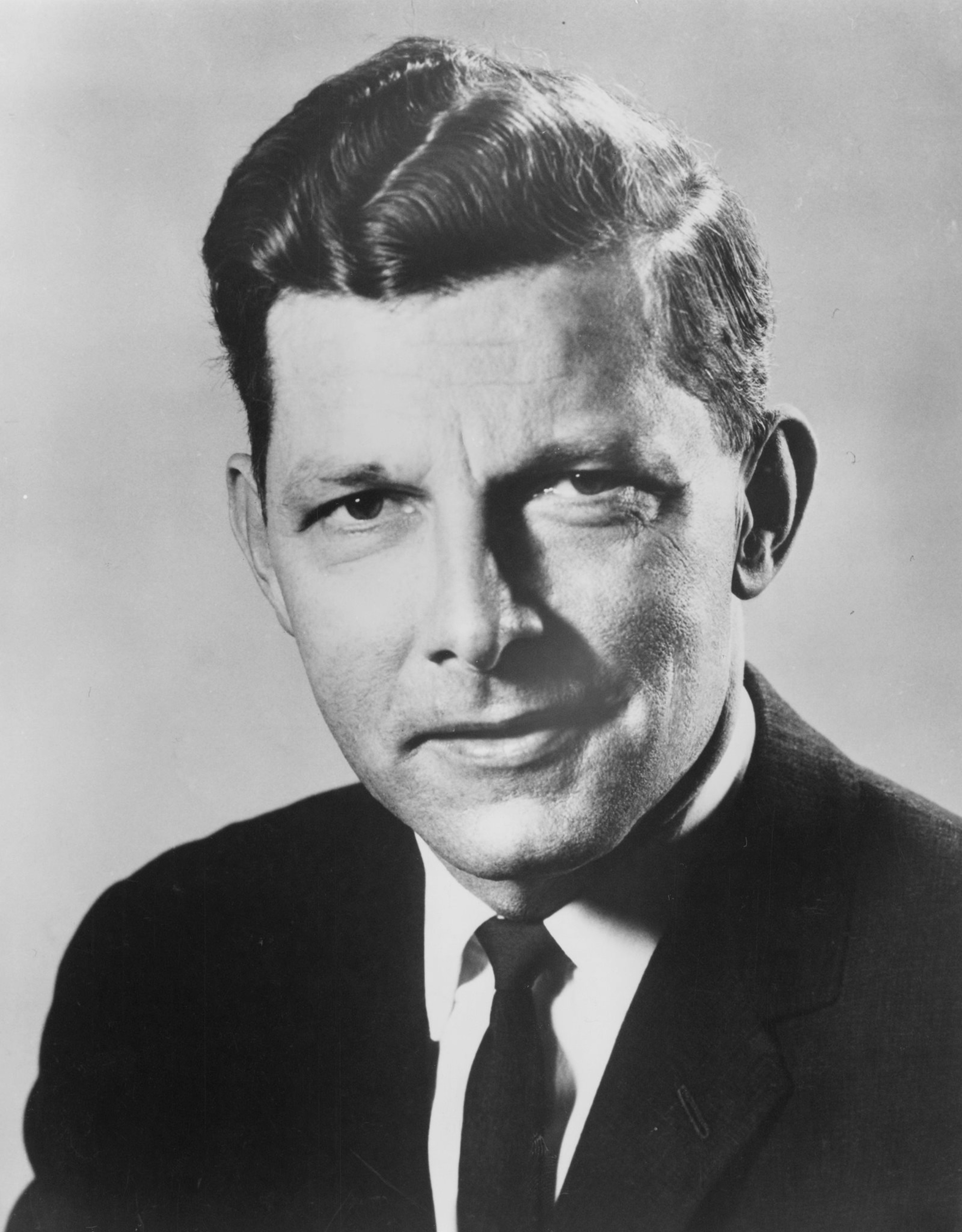

United States Senator from Wyoming
- In office January 3, 1959 – January 3, 1977
- Preceded by: Frank A. Barrett
- Succeeded by: Malcolm Wallop

9th United States Ambassador to the Organization of American States
- In office March 30, 1977 – July 1, 1981
- President: Jimmy Carter; Ronald Reagan
- Preceded by: William S. Mailliard
- Succeeded by: J. William Middendorf

Personal details
- Born: Gale William McGee; March 17, 1915 Lincoln, Nebraska, U.S.
- Died: April 9, 1992 (aged 77) Washington, D.C., U.S.
- Resting place: Oak Hill Cemetery; Washington, D.C., U.S.
- Party: Democratic
- Spouse: Loraine Baker McGee (m. 1939)
- Children: 4
- Education: State Teachers College (BA); University of Colorado (MA); University of Chicago (PhD)

Gale William McGee (March 17, 1915 – April 9, 1992) was an American politician, diplomat and historian who served as a United States senator from Wyoming from 1959 to 1977 and as the U.S. ambassador to the Organization of American States (OAS) from 1977 to 1981. To date, he remains the last Democrat to have represented Wyoming in the U.S. Senate.

== Early life ==
Born on March 17, 1915, in Lincoln, Nebraska, he was raised in Norfolk, Nebraska, in a politically active Republican family. During his early education he identified as a Republican, but his views evolved through his college and graduate studies. By the late 1940s he had moved from Republican affiliation to political independence and ultimately aligned with the Democratic Party.

McGee graduated from Norfolk High School in 1932. A graduation trip to Washington, D.C., and seeing U.S. Senator George W. Norris speak in the Senate chamber, inspired his interest in public service. Because of the economic conditions of the Great Depression, he attended Wayne State Teachers College, graduating in 1936 with degrees in history, political science, and speech. He later earned a master’s degree from the University of Colorado.

McGee pursued doctoral studies at the University of Chicago, where he studied diplomatic and Latin American history under historian J. Fred Rippy and political theorist Hans Morgenthau. His academic work during this period marked a significant shift from earlier isolationist views to support for a more engaged U.S. foreign policy.

Prior to the United States’ entry into World War II, McGee expressed skepticism about American involvement in the European conflict and sought conscientious objector status. After the attack on Pearl Harbor, he withdrew his objection and attempted to enlist in the United States Navy, but he was ultimately denied induction because of a diagnosis of diabetes.

During the war, McGee taught in the Navy’s V-12 Navy College Training Program, instructing officer candidates at institutions including University of Notre Dame. His earlier opposition to U.S. engagement in the war drew mild controversy when it became known that he was teaching military cadets, though he was later reinstated and continued his academic career.

== University of Wyoming ==
Shortly after receiving his Ph.D., McGee accepted a position as a professor of American history at the University of Wyoming. He became widely recognized for his expertise in American foreign policy and contributed analyses on U.S.-China relations and the post-World War II balance of power. He founded and served as chair of the university's Institute of International Affairs, which brought national dignitaries to the university every summer through a grant from the Carnegie Foundation. Each summer, 21 teachers from Wyoming high schools were selected to participate. Over the next 12 years, the Institute hosted prominent policy thinkers such as Sidney Hook, Eleanor Roosevelt, Hans Morgenthau, and Henry Kissinger.

=== Textbook controversy ===
In 1947, University of Wyoming trustees, influenced by concerns raised at a Michigan conference, initiated a "Red Scare" textbook review, suspecting subversive content in school libraries. UW President George Duke Humphrey assembled a faculty panel. Professor McGee, lacking tenure, openly criticized the board's action as jeopardizing academic freedom and faced attempts by a board member to dismiss him. Ultimately, University trustees, including Milward Simpson, opposed McGee's firing, advocating for free expression. The review found no un-American content, ending the controversy, though McGee endured social backlash and accusations of communism.

In 1950, McGee had been urged to run for the United States House of Representatives from Wyoming but declined, following the advice of political mentors and observing the challenging electoral climate for Democrats.

=== Sabbaticals ===
From 1952 to 1953, he held a fellowship at the Council on Foreign Relations, meeting policymakers including John Foster Dulles and J. Robert Oppenheimer, further expanding his understanding of Cold War strategy.

In the mid-1950s, McGee joined the Washington staff of Joseph C. O'Mahoney, then a U.S. Senator from Wyoming, serving as a legislative assistant. In this role, he gained exposure to senior policymakers, including Lyndon B. Johnson, John F. Kennedy, and Mike Mansfield, contributing to investigations on antitrust and agricultural issues and deepening his experience in legislative processes.

== United States Senator ==
In 1958, McGee took a leave of absence from the university to run for the U.S. Senate, challenging the incumbent Frank A. Barrett. He campaigned on a platform of youth and new ideas. The race between McGee and Barrett drew national attention, with prominent leaders from both political parties involved. Senate Majority Leader Lyndon B. Johnson of Texas, Senator John F. Kennedy of Massachusetts, Senator Wayne Morse of Oregon, Senator-elect Edmund Muskie of Maine, Congressman Joseph M. Montoya of New Mexico, and former President Harry S. Truman came to the state to support McGee, whose campaign slogan was "McGee for Me!". Lyndon Johnson pledged that, if Wyoming elected McGee, he would secure him a seat on the prestigious Appropriations Committee. Eleanor Roosevelt even led a national fundraising drive for him. Barrett also received support from prominent leaders, including then-Vice President Richard Nixon.

McGee defeated Barrett by 1,913 votes out of 116,230 cast. He won a majority in seven of Wyoming's 23 counties: the southern "Union Pacific" counties (Albany, Carbon, Laramie, Sweetwater, Uinta) Platte, just north of Cheyenne, and Sheridan in the north. McGee earned the endorsement of the Wyoming AFL-CIO Committee on Political Education (COPE), and the labor vote played a significant role in his victory.

Vice President Richard Nixon administers the oath of office to Senator Gale McGee, 1959

=== Domestic issues ===
==== Advocate for Wyoming interests ====
During his tenure in the Senate, McGee prioritized both national policy and the specific needs of his Wyoming constituents. While generally supportive of free trade, he drew the line on imports affecting Wyoming’s key industries, such as meat and oil, recognizing their economic and political significance locally. Early in his Senate career, he focused on water policy, livestock, and energy issues, believing that defending the daily concerns of ranchers, gas station owners, and small business operators created a foundation to pursue broader domestic and foreign policy goals.

===== Appropriations Committee =====
McGee was appointed to the United States Senate Committee on Appropriations following a promise from Lyndon B. Johnson after his first term. From 1971 to 1976, he chaired the Agriculture-Environmental and Consumer Protection Subcommittee, directing federal funds to Wyoming-based projects. Significant appropriations included $499 million (2024 dollars) for Yellowtail Dam, $350 million for Flaming Gorge Dam and its National Recreation Area, $225 million for the Seedskadee Project, $50 million for the U.S. Post Office and Federal Building in Casper, and $48 million for Cheyenne’s federal building. McGee’s influence helped shape infrastructure development and environmental management in the state.

===== Energy and Mineral Policy =====
A strong advocate for Wyoming’s oil, gas, and mineral industries, McGee worked closely with colleagues Teno Roncalio and Cliff Hansen to ensure that federal mineral royalties returned 50% to resource-rich states under the Federal Land Policy and Management Act. McGee staunchly defended the oil depletion allowance, arguing it incentivized exploration in high-risk regions like Wyoming and safeguarded the industry's competitiveness.

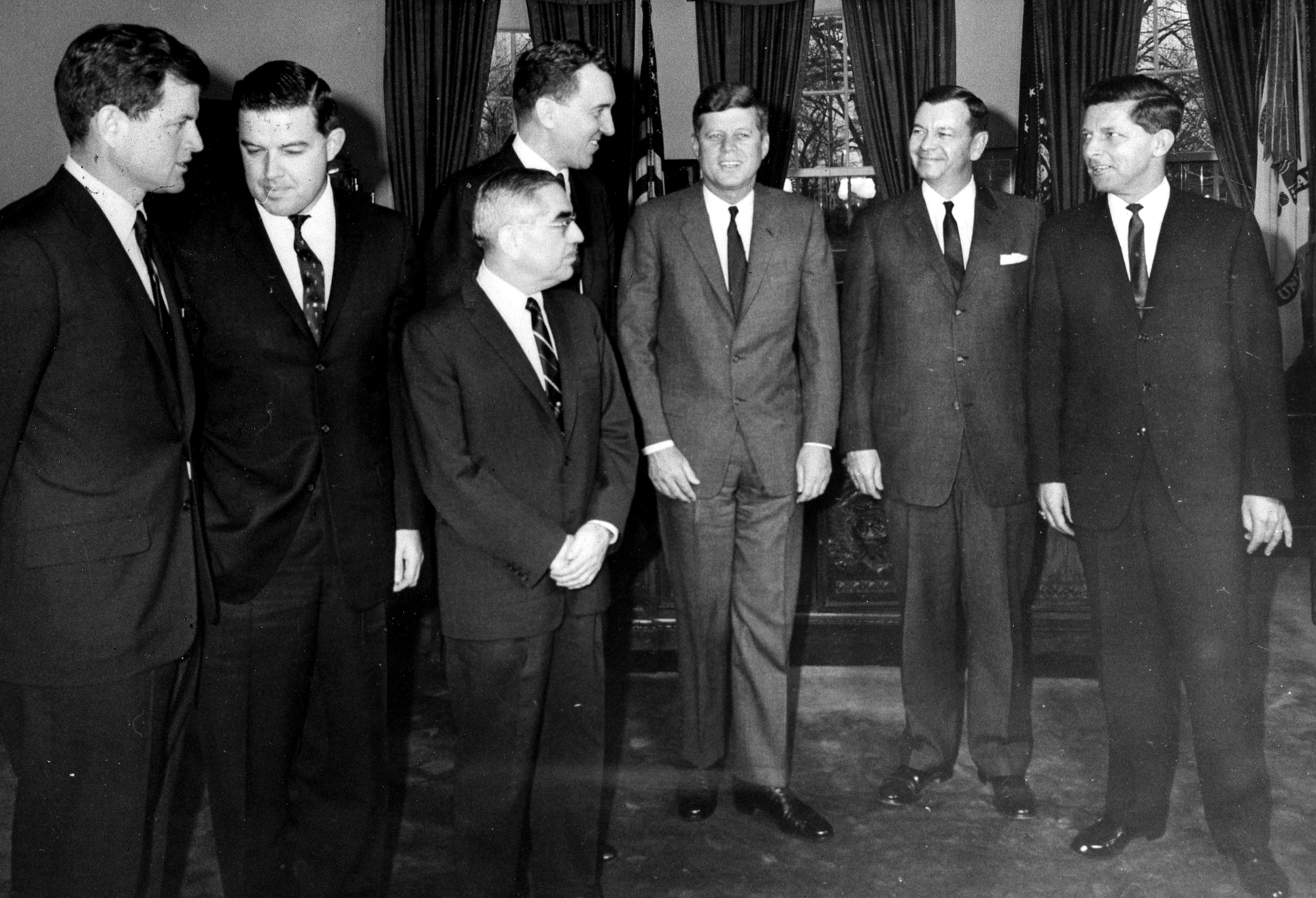
Jan 1963, President John F. Kennedy & U.S. Senators discuss wool imports in the Oval Office. Pictured (L-R): Senators Ted Kennedy, Frank Church, John Pastore, Ed Muskie, Kennedy, Herman Talmadge, and Gale McGee.

===== Ranchers and Livestock =====
McGee actively supported Wyoming ranchers, voicing concerns over monopolistic practices by national grocery chains that suppressed cattle prices in the early 1960s. He advocated for FTC investigations into antitrust violations and promoted legislation to empower agricultural producers. McGee also championed the American wool and lamb industries, backing import quotas, tariffs, and the National Wool Act. He even secured a commemorative U.S. stamp in 1970 marking 450 years of sheep in North America.

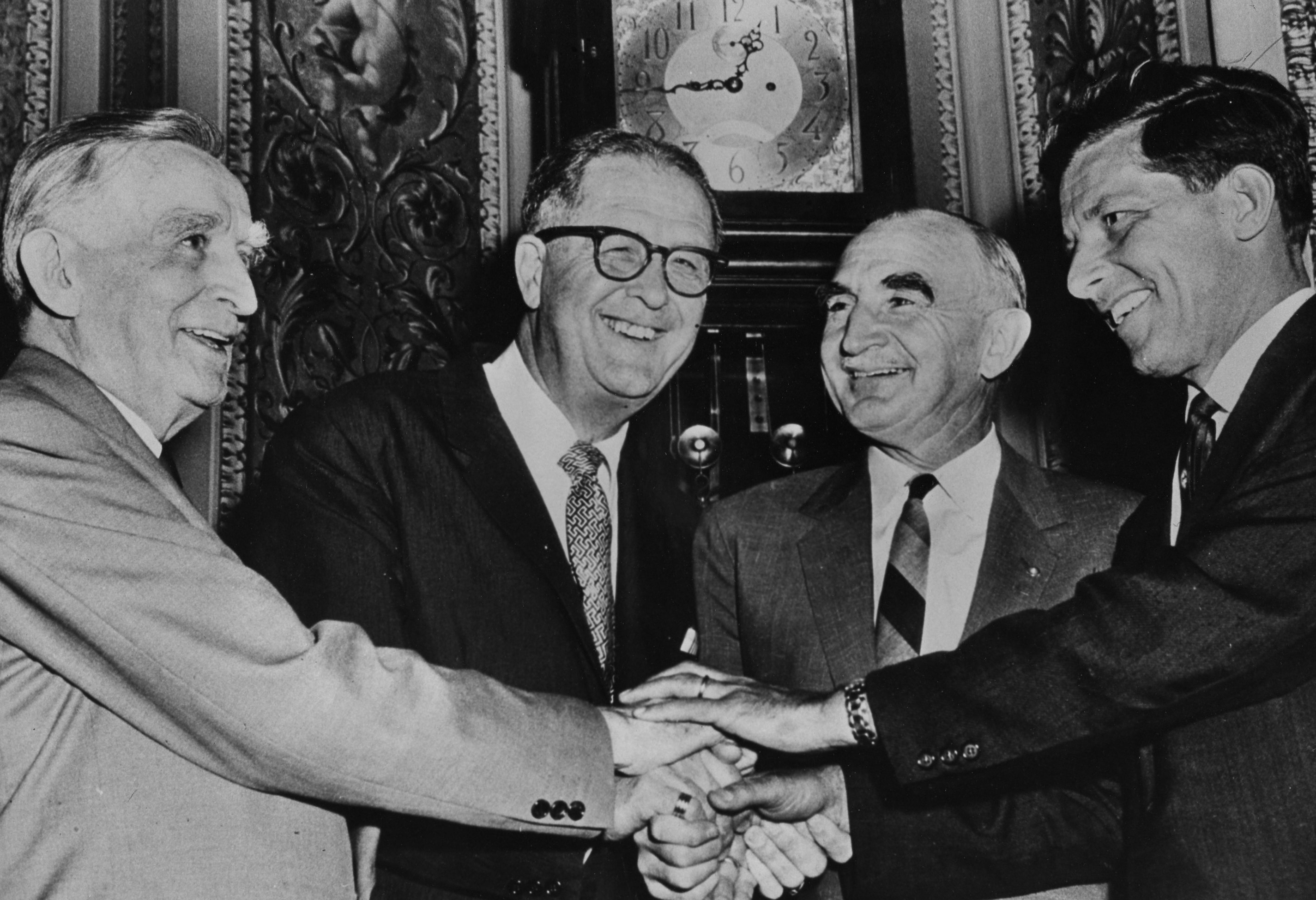
On June 19, 1959, Senators O'Mahoney (D-Wyo), Anderson (D-N.M.), Morse (D-Ore), and McGee celebrated at the Ohio Clock outside the Senate Chamber after leading the effort to defeat Lewis Strauss's nomination for U.S. Secretary of Commerce.

==== Cabinet and Judicial Nominations ====
McGee evaluated presidential Cabinet and judicial nominees primarily on merit and national interest. He supported most appointments but opposed nominees with concerning civil rights records, including Clement Haynsworth and G. Harrold Carswell. Notably, he led Senate opposition to Lewis Strauss’s nomination as Secretary of Commerce in 1959, raising concerns over transparency and executive privilege; the nomination ultimately failed, one of only eight rejected Cabinet appointments in U.S. history.

In the 2023 film Oppenheimer, McGee was portrayed by Harry Groener.

==== "Champion" of Congressional recess ====
In 1961, Senator McGee began calling for a mandated August recess for Congress. It was not until 1969 that his idea gained enough support among his colleagues that they gave it a test run — the Senate recessed from August 13 to September 3. Finally, on August 6, 1971, as mandated by the Legislative Reorganization Act of 1970, the Senate began its first official August recess.

==== Civil Rights and Labor ====
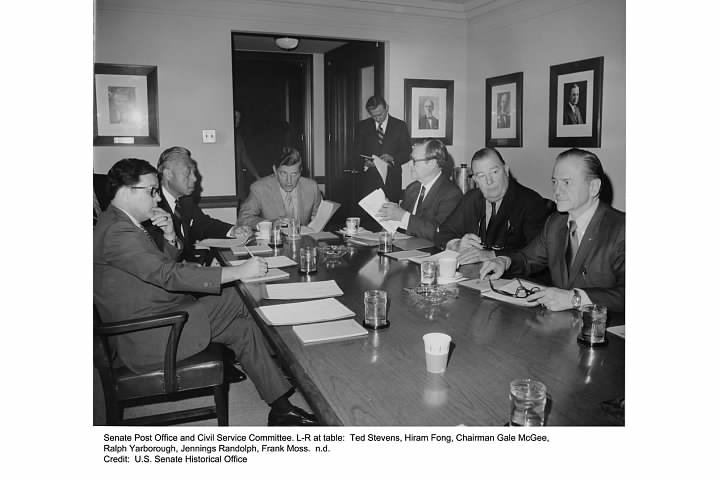
United States Senate Committee on Civil Service (L-R): Senators Ted Stevens (R-AK), Ranking Member Hiram Fong (R-HI), Chairman Gale McGee (D-WY), Ralph Yarborough (D-TX), Jennings Randolph (D-WV), and Frank Moss (D-UT).

McGee played a key role in civil rights legislation, supporting the Civil Rights Act of 1964 and the Voting Rights Act of 1965, and commemorating Wyoming-born Reverend James Reeb’s murder during the Selma marches.

A staunch labor advocate, he opposed right-to-work laws, brokered compromises during the 1963 railroad strike, and helped resolve the 1970 postal strike, securing reforms and pay raises for federal employees.McGee also helped resolve the emoluments clause issue during William B. Saxbe's appointment as Attorney General by facilitating the precedent-setting "Saxbe fix" to adjust salary conflicts for Cabinet appointments. As Chairman of the Senate Post Office and Civil Service Committee, he oversaw initiatives including pension reform, federal employee rights, and the landmark Postal Reorganization Act, which created the modern United States Postal Service. Notably, the strike prompted Nixon to install the Oval Office taping system for accurate record-keeping—ultimately a key factor in his downfall during Watergate.

==== Environment/natural resources ====
McGee championed conservation, balancing resource development with environmental protection. He supported the Fort Laramie National Historic Site, The Wilderness Act, establishment of the Fossil Butte National Monument, establishment of the Flaming Gorge National Recreation Area, the Highway Beautification Act, the National Wildlife Refuge System Administration Act of 1966, the incorporation of South Absaroka Wilderness into the Washakie Wilderness, Shoshone National Forest, the Environmental Quality Improvement Act, and the Endangered Species Act He addressed conflicts over Yellowstone Lake boating, advocated for humane and cooperative methods to manage Yellowstone's overpopulated elk herd, and challenged clearcutting practices in the West's forests

As Chairman of Agriculture, Environmental and Consumer Protection Appropriations Subcommittee he strengthened protections for bald and golden eagles, responding to reports of predation on livestock.

===== Energy and Mining Oversight =====
During Wyoming’s 1970s coal boom, McGee navigated population growth and infrastructure pressures, advocating for balanced policies in the Surface Mining Control and Reclamation Act. He also opposed nuclear-based energy extraction projects like Project Wagon Wheel in Sublette County, securing legislation to prohibit federal funding for nuclear oil and gas recovery.

==== Gun Policy, Native Americans, and Elections ====
McGee opposed restrictive federal gun regulations, supporting amendments to the Gun Control Act of 1968 to protect law-abiding sportsmen and small businesses.

He promoted Native American self-determination, co-sponsoring the 1972 Indian Self-Determination Act and establishing the St. Stephens Indian School on the Wind River Reservation.

In 1972, he proposed voter registration by mail to increase electoral participation, though the initiative stalled in the House.

==== Political Influence and National Issues ====
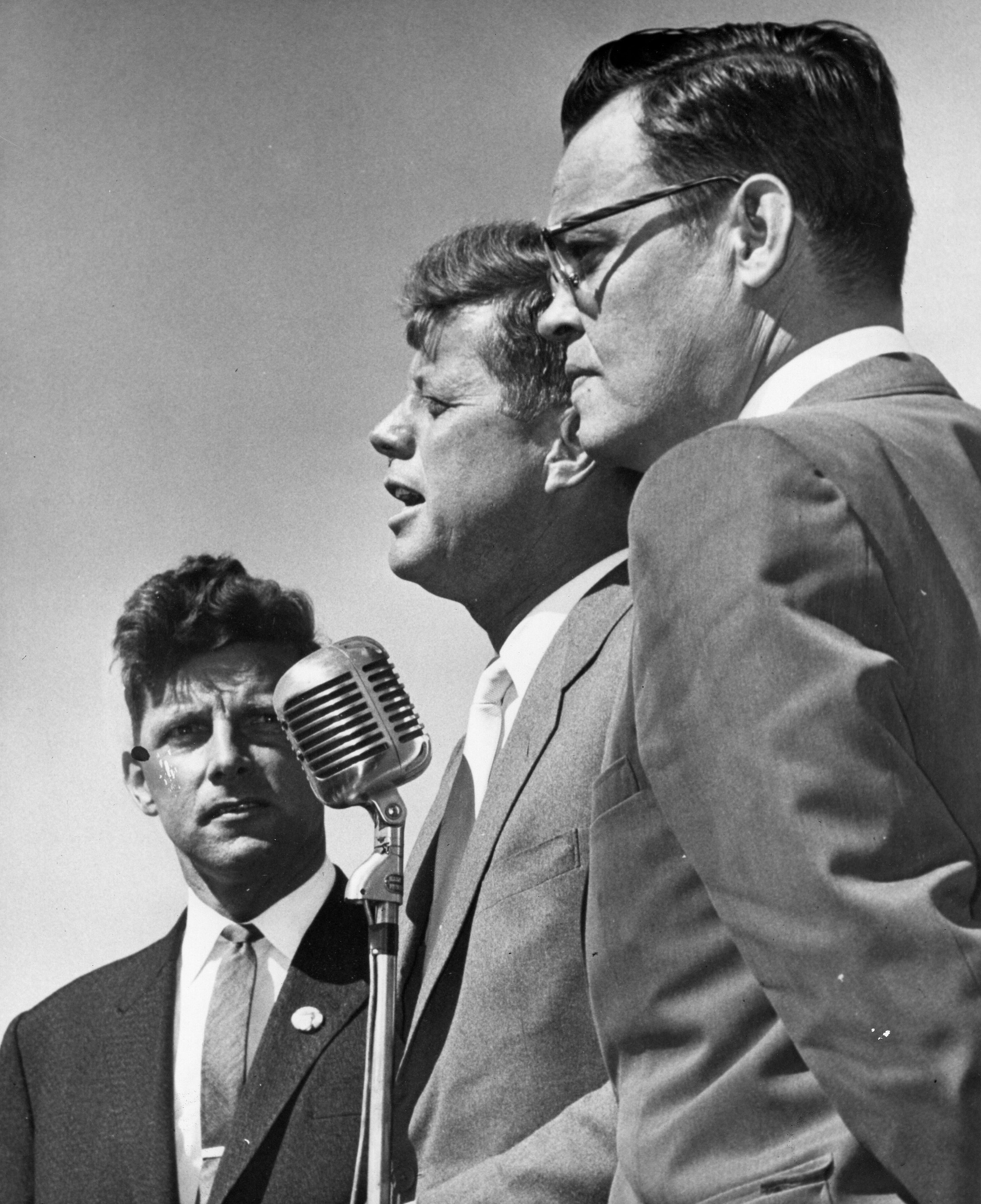
Presidential candidate John F. Kennedy, with Senate candidate Raymond B. Whitaker and Senator Gale McGee (D-Wyo.), addresses a Cheyenne airport crowd before leaving for Denver and Chicago for a televised debate with Richard M. Nixon

McGee played a pivotal role in the 1960 Democratic presidential campaign, chairing Wyoming’s delegation and securing its support for John F. Kennedy on the first ballot.

Kennedy initially planned to bypass Wyoming in the general election due to its low electoral vote count, but McGee and Party Chairman Tracy McCraken convinced him otherwise. During a visit to Cheyenne on September 23, 1960, Kennedy acknowledged Wyoming's instrumental role in his nomination and demonstrated his understanding of the state's concerns, such as natural resource development. This visit reinforced Kennedy's connections with Wyoming leaders. Despite their efforts, Kennedy lost Wyoming in the general election, with the state's three electoral votes going to Richard Nixon.

He challenged right-wing extremism, including the John Birch Society, and introduced the Uniform Time Act to standardize daylight saving time and time zones nationally. President Johnson signed the bill into law on April 13, 1966.

==== Watergate scandal ====
McGee approached the Watergate scandal with caution, prioritizing institutional integrity over partisan response. As evidence of wrongdoing emerged, he shifted to a position emphasizing accountability, ultimately recognizing President Richard Nixon’s resignation as unavoidable. Nixon would resign on August 8, 1974.

=== Foreign policy and foreign aid ===
McGee was a committed anti-communist whose views were shaped by the Domino Theory during the Cold War, which posited that the fall of one nation to communism could trigger the collapse of neighboring countries. His doctoral dissertation, The Founding Fathers and Entangling Alliances, argued for U.S. engagement in global affairs to maintain a balance of power.

McGee served on the United States Senate Committee on Foreign Relations from 1967, was reappointed in 1969, and remained until his 1976 defeat. He chaired the Foreign Operations Appropriations Subcommittee (1969–1970) and the African Affairs Subcommittee (1969–1972). He also led the 1971 Anglo-American Conference on Africa in Teton Village, Wyoming.

==== Africa ====
McGee emphasized support for African self-determination and political stability. He observed the Congo Crisis firsthand in 1960 and proposed solutions involving strengthened United Nations forces, a legitimate government, and the return of Belgian technicians. He supported a unified Nigeria during its civil war and opposed Biafran independence, advocating national cohesion over tribal divisions. In the 1970s, he worked to repeal the Byrd Amendment, which violated UN sanctions on Rhodesia by permitting U.S. imports of chromite, warning that short-term economic gains could damage relations with African nations. In 1977, after McGee had been defeated for re-election, President Jimmy Carter signed into law a resolution to reestablish the embargo against the purchase of chrome from Rhodesia.

==== Asia ====
McGee advocated sustained U.S. involvement in Asia to maintain influence and prevent domination by China. McGee visited China in 1973 as part of a Congressional delegation, meeting Zhou Enlai and discussing U.S. involvement in Cambodia and regional stability.

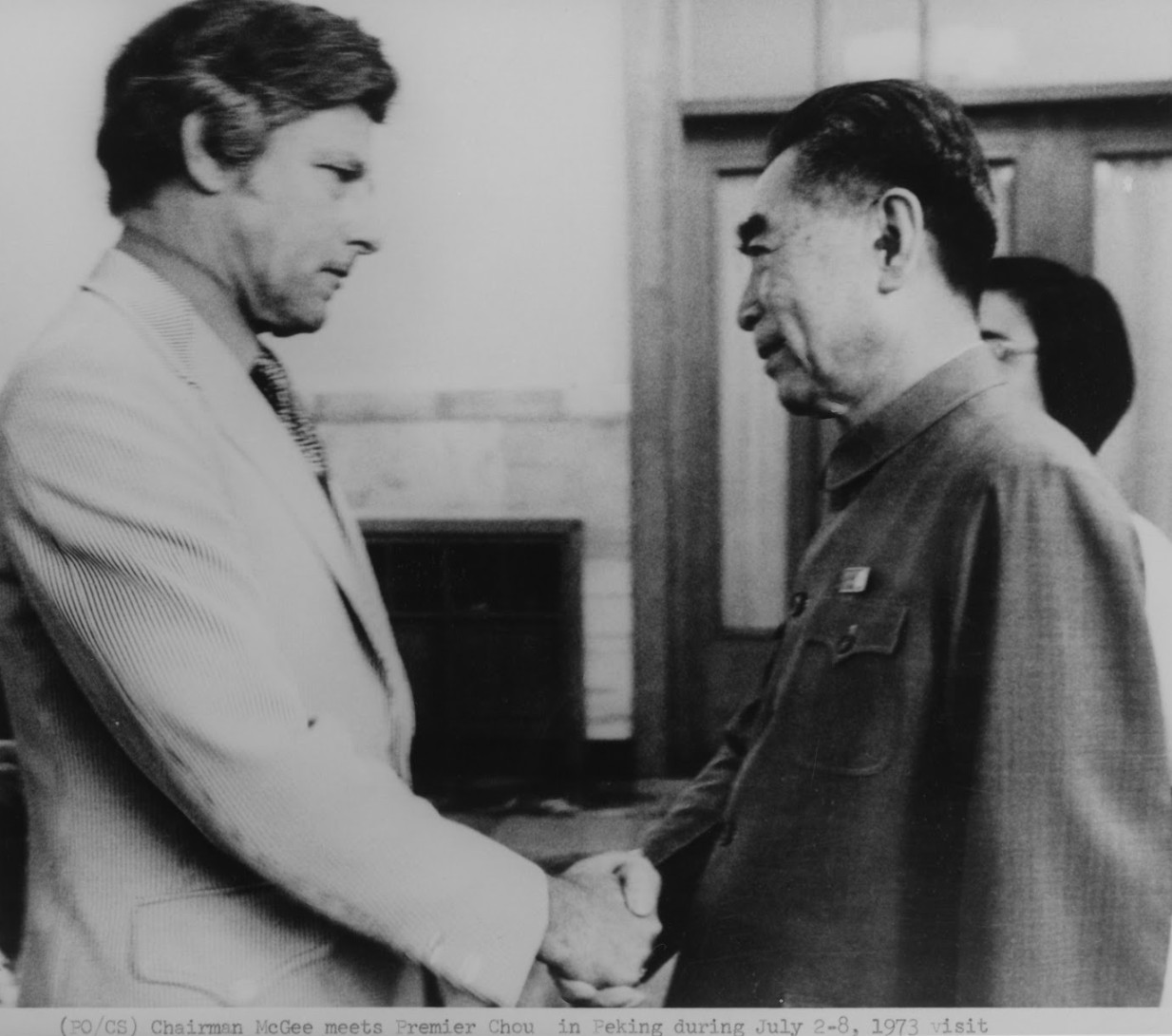
July 5, 1973, Senator Gale W. McGee (D-WY) meets Chinese Premier Zhou Enlai in Beijing (the Peking)

In a one-on-one conversation, Zhou affirmed McGee's belief in the domino theory, suggesting that U.S. intervention in Southeast Asia had prevented Chinese expansion, validating McGee's support of the Vietnam War.

He also engaged with India (meeting Jawaharlal Nehru and Indira Gandhi regarding aid and border disputes) and opposed aggressive responses to North Korean incidents, including the USS Pueblo capture (1968) and the EC-121 shootdown (1969), advocating diplomacy alongside intelligence operations.

===== Vietnam War =====
McGee consistently supported United States involvement in the Vietnam War, emphasizing the necessity of preventing communist expansion in Southeast Asia. He advocated a strong military presence, supported gradual escalation, and opposed immediate withdrawal or negotiations without a position of strength. McGee viewed the war as part of the broader Cold War struggle and endorsed the domino theory, fearing U.S. retreat could lead to neighboring countries falling under communist control. While he backed peace talks, he stressed that any negotiated settlement must ensure regional stability.

McGee first visited Vietnam in December 1959 with Albert Gore Sr., touring northern jungles and the Mekong Delta, meeting with Ngo Dinh Diem, farmers, and refugees.

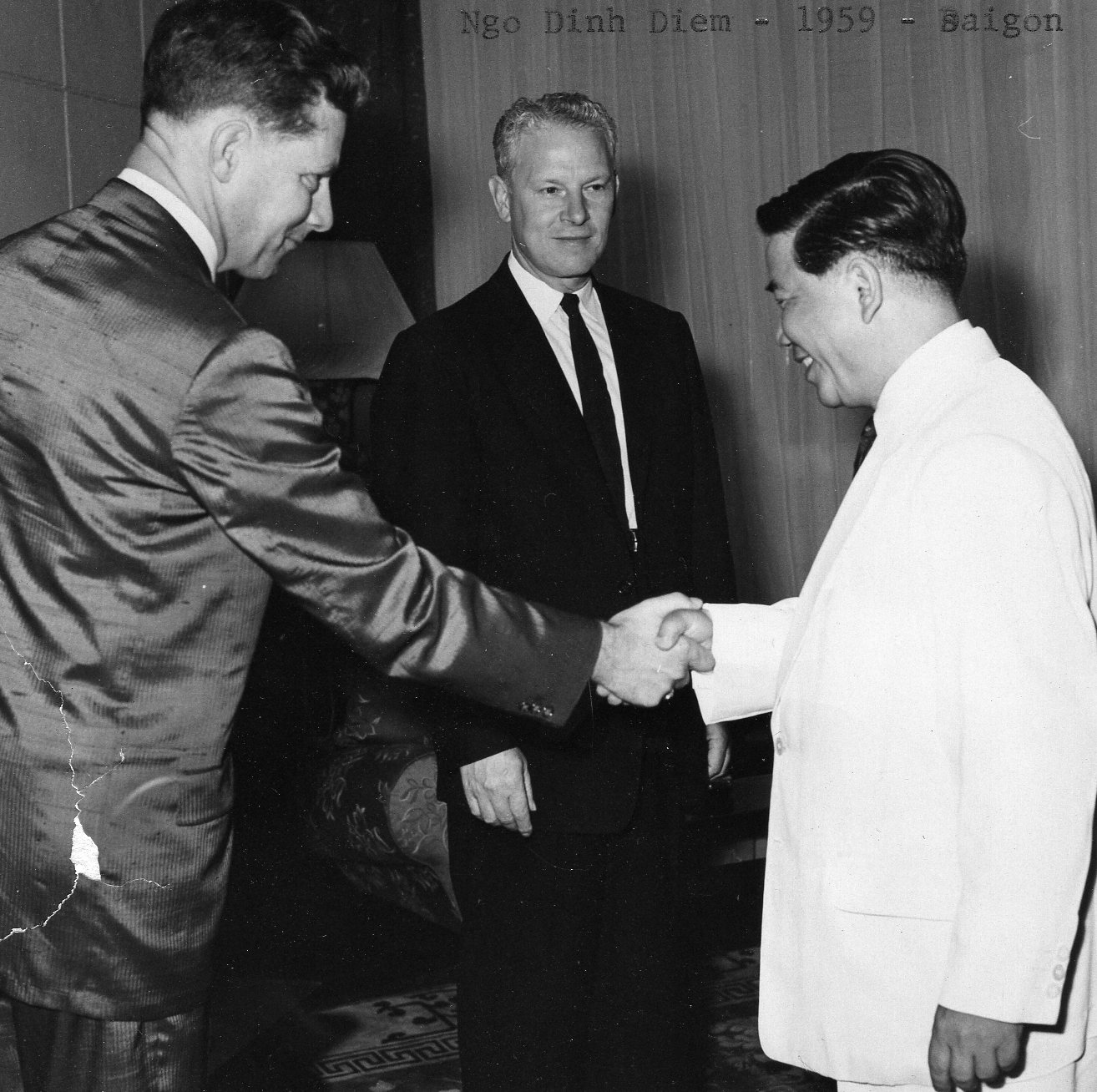
December 1959 - Senators McGee (D-WY) (L), and Gore Sr. (D-TN), meet With Ngo Dinh Diem, President of South Vietnam, in Saigon. Gore and McGee visited to evaluate US foreign aid programs in Vietnam.

In February 1960, he addressed the Senate, defending Diem's progress in resettlement and highlighting Vietnam's strategic importance.

In 1962, he joined Senators Frank Church and Ted Moss on a Southeast Asia fact-finding mission, visiting Vietnam and evaluating the Strategic Hamlet Program, noting both successes and human rights concerns. Their report emphasized Communist China's influence while expressing cautious optimism about South Vietnam’s counterinsurgency efforts.

Following the Gulf of Tonkin incident on August 2, 1964, McGee supported the Gulf of Tonkin Resolution, authorizing President Lyndon B. Johnson to escalate U.S. military action.

In 1965, he debated George McGovern and Church on the Senate floor and on CBS, defending U.S. involvement and warning of the dangers of communist expansion. He supported Vietnamization, transferring military responsibility to South Vietnam while continuing U.S. aid. McGee also participated in campus teach-ins, engaging with students while encouraging civil discourse and criticizing excessive FBI monitoring of protests.

In 1966, McGee strategically traded committee assignments to join the Senate Foreign Relations Committee and visited Vietnam with Cyrus Vance, observing the intensity of the conflict and noting discontent among South Vietnamese allies. He advised Johnson to strengthen South Vietnamese forces and suggested increased U.S. combat involvement to shorten the war.

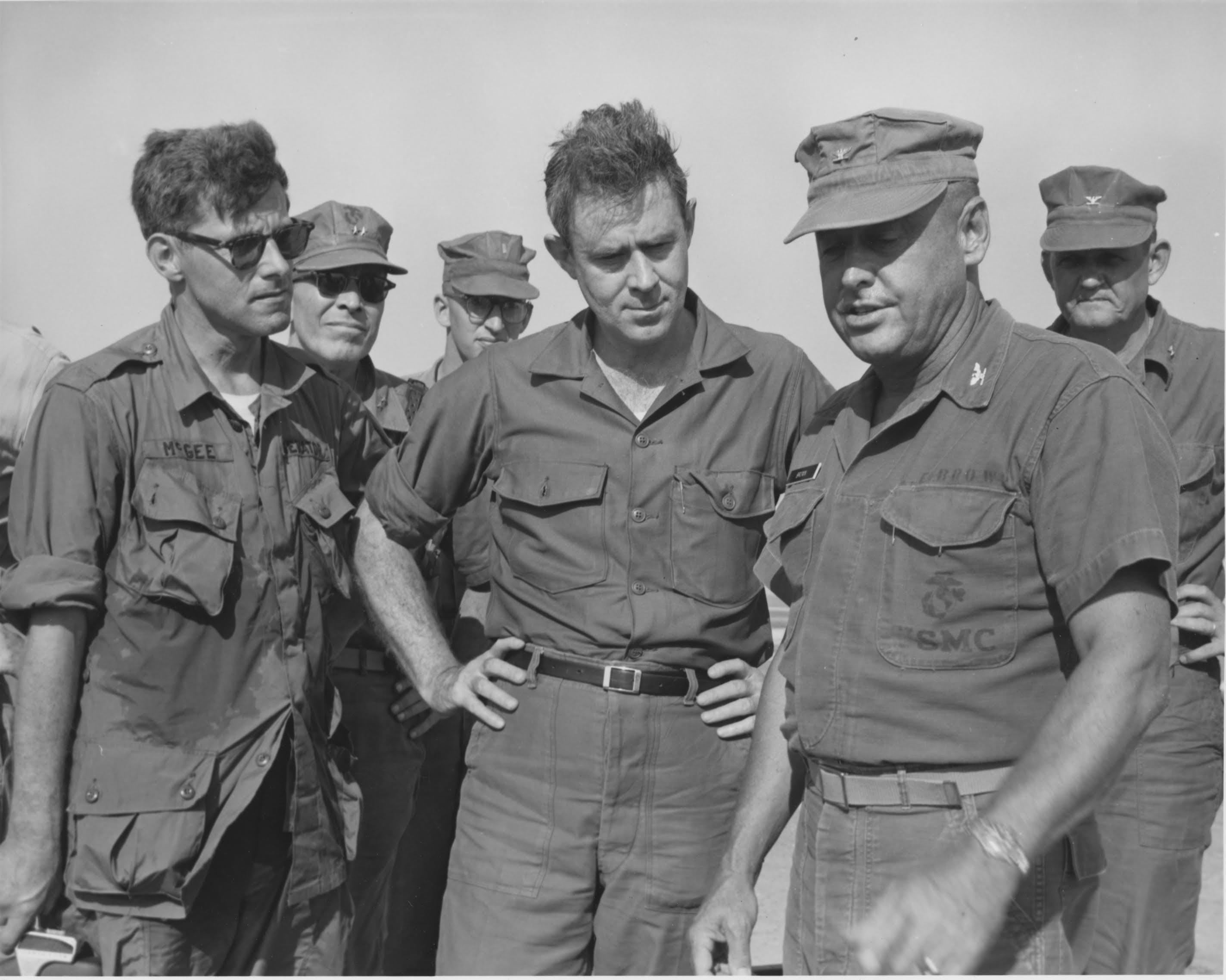
April 1966 – Gale McGee (D-Wyo.) and U.S. Deputy Secretary of Defense Cy Vance on tour of military bases in Vietnam

His strong defense of the war often put him at odds with Chairman J. William Fulbright, particularly over criticisms of U.S. military power.

McGee debated Vietnam with Hans Morgenthau, his former University of Chicago professor, defending U.S. involvement and advocating containment, while Morgenthau opposed the war and criticized bombing campaigns.

In 1968, McGee published The Responsibilities of World Power in response to Fulbright’s The Arrogance of Power, defending U.S. strategy and emphasizing the importance of credibility and regional stability.

In January 1969, McGee returned to the Senate Foreign Relations Committee, vacated by anti-war candidate Eugene McCarthy. McGee's reappointment reignited his political ambitions, and his first public statement expressed support for President Nixon's Vietnamization plan to gradually withdraw U.S. troops and shift responsibility to South Vietnam. While continuing to back the Vietnam War, McGee also advocated for respecting the rights of anti-war protesters, urging schools to take student activists seriously. However, he condemned the growing anti-war movement, warning it could lead to isolationism and radicalism. During Vietnam Moratorium Day in October 1969, McGee labeled the protests irresponsible.

In May 1970, Senator McGee became increasingly isolated on the Senate Foreign Relations Committee as his Democratic colleagues turned against the Vietnam War. He initially defended Nixon's decision to invade Cambodia, urging patience, but the Kent State shooting, where National Guard troops killed four students during an anti-war protest, sparked widespread protests in Wyoming. The Wyoming New Democratic Coalition and Young Democrats called for Nixon's impeachment. McGee tried to calm the unrest, encouraging students to focus on voter registration. On the University of Wyoming campus, tensions over a "Kent State" flag led to a compromise, and a vote condemning the killings.

In 1971, following the New York Times' publication of the Pentagon Papers, McGee expressed concern that the release could harm U.S. credibility, strain alliances, and fuel adversarial propaganda, while also constituting a security breach. He acknowledged the study's historical value but cautioned against drawing conclusions based solely on its limited scope. Emphasizing the importance of transparency, McGee also stressed the need for responsible handling of classified information and objective analysis. He warned against emotional reactions influencing public opinion or policy decisions during crises, advocating for calm and reasoned evaluation.

McGee opposed the War Powers Resolution, arguing that the nation needed a modernization of decision-making processes rather than a solution based on outdated 1787 principles. He proposed forming a high-level panel to update foreign policy processes, with recommendations for Congress to adopt or reject, reflecting modern needs.

In January 1973, the Vietnam War officially ended with the signing of a peace agreement in Paris, but fighting between North and South Vietnam continued, and U.S. bombing of Cambodia persisted until Congress intervened. By this time, McGee had quietly distanced himself from President Nixon, frustrated with the ongoing war, especially in Cambodia. In early January, McGee reluctantly spoke on the Senate floor against his party's position to end war funding, though he was aware of the war's deceptive origins, such as the Gulf of Tonkin incident. Despite his disillusionment, McGee defended Nixon's role in winding down the war, but by the end of the month, Nixon declared the war over. McGee's speech marked his final defense of the war, and afterward, he vowed never to defend it again.

On April 14, 1975, McGee and members of the Senate Foreign Relations Committee met with President Ford, Secretary of State Henry Kissinger, Defense Secretary James Schlesinger regarding Vietnam in the Cabinet Room in White House. The meeting was called after President Ford requested $722 million in military aid to support South Vietnam against the North Vietnamese communists. This request came two years after the end of the U.S. combat mission in Vietnam. The committee members were concerned about the evacuation of American citizens and the possibility of a new war. They are also concerned about the amount of aid being requested by the President. The President assured the committee that his orders will be carried out and that he was committed to getting the Americans out safely. 2 weeks later, Saigon would fall.

==== International organizations and treaties ====
Throughout his career, McGee strongly supported the goals and activities of international organizations such as the United Nations, NATO, and the World Bank to protect and promote U.S. interests around the world. In 1973, McGee introduced a resolution to a convention to explore an Atlantic Union between the US and North Atlantic Community.

He supported initiatives like the Antarctic Treaty, the Limited Test Ban Treaty, and the Nuclear Non-Proliferation Treaty, viewing them as crucial steps toward international stability.

===== Panama Canal Treaty =====
McGee was a strong proponent of ratification of the Panama Canal Treaty. In 1974, McGee joined Secretary of State Henry Kissinger and Ellsworth Bunker in Panama City for the US and Panama to sign an agreement to begin negotiations on the Panama Canal Treaty. He would later introduce a Senate Concurrent Resolution endorsing the principles for the new treaty. Throughout 1975–76, he was one of the most vocal supporters for the treaty, giving numerous speeches in the Senate, speeches to outside groups, as well as publishing Op-Eds, emphasizing the importance of considering the economic, military, and political aspects of the canal, while dismissing emotional arguments and outdated rhetoric.

His public support would ultimately lead to his appointment as President Carter's OAS Ambassador and point person to push for ratification in the Senate.

===== The United Nations =====
Throughout his career, McGee was a strong advocate for the United Nations, defending its role in diplomacy and support for U.S. interests. He countered criticism - often from his own constituents - of the UN as ineffective, citing its success in various crises and emphasizing its importance for global peace and security. McGee supported funding the UN and negotiated a reduction in U.S. dues to ease the financial burden while advocating increased contributions to key programs like the UN Development Programme

In 1967, President Lyndon Johnson offered McGee the position of U.S. Ambassador to the United Nations, suggesting it might lead to a future Secretary of State role. McGee ultimately declined, and Adlai Stevenson II was nominated. Later, in 1972, President Nixon appointed McGee to a Congressional Delegation at the UN General Assembly, where McGee's main objective was to secure a reduction of the U.S. annual dues from 31 percent to 25 percent. Working with Ambassador George H. W. Bush, McGee successfully gained support for the reduction from 80 nations.

==== Latin America ====
McGee's interest in foreign affairs began during his studies at the University of Chicago, where he focused on Latin America under J. Fred Rippy and Hans Morgenthau. This foundation led to McGee's Ph.D. in international political affairs. McGee had extensive experience in the region, having visited every country in the hemisphere multiple times. During his tenure on the Senate Foreign Relations Committee, McGee served as Chairman of the Western Hemisphere Affairs Subcommittee from 1973 to 1976.

===== Alliance for Progress =====
The Alliance for Progress, an initiative launched by President John F. Kennedy in 1961 to promote economic cooperation and social reform in Latin America. It aimed to improve living standards, counter communism during the Cold War, and foster economic growth and strengthen ties with Latin America. The program proposed significant financial aid and investments in education, healthcare, and infrastructure.

McGee played a key role in advocating for and overseeing the Alliance for Progress. In November 1961, McGee, along with Senators Clair Engle, Ted Moss and Stephen Young, undertook a trip to South America to report on developments in the region for President Kennedy. The trip was significant in light of Kennedy's focus on Latin America, which aimed to strengthen U.S. relations in the region. McGee valued the opportunity to engage with the local realities and emphasized Moss's work ethic as beneficial to their efforts.

He emphasized the importance of this initiative and the urgency of implementing tangible reforms. While acknowledging the challenges and criticisms surrounding the program, McGee remained optimistic about its potential to bring positive change to the region. He stressed the importance of continued U.S. support and collaboration with Latin American countries to achieve the goals of the Alliance for Progress.

===== Chile =====
In 1973, McGee, as Chairman of the Western Hemisphere Affairs Subcommittee, investigated the CIA's involvement in the 1973 Chilean coup d'état which overthrew Salvador Allende. Despite CIA denials, revelations of U.S. efforts to destabilize Chile emerged later, including Henry Kissinger’s approval of funds to undermine Allende. This led to skepticism about CIA actions and informed congressional reforms, including the Hughes–Ryan Amendment, mandating covert operations oversight.

===== Cuba =====
In March 1960, U.S. President Dwight D. Eisenhower approved a CIA plan to train Cuban exiles to overthrow Fidel Castro’s government in Cuba. The resulting Bay of Pigs Invasion, under President Kennedy in April 1961, failed.

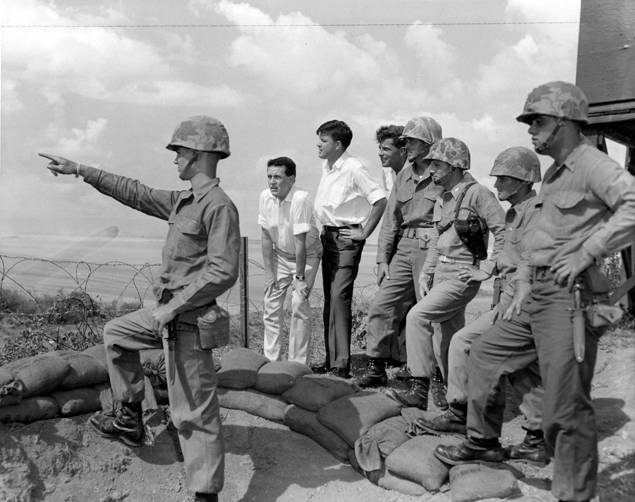
September 29, 1962 – Rep. James Fulton (R-PA), Senators Frank Church (D-ID), Gale W. McGee (D-WY) at Guantanamo Naval Base in Cuba, leading up to the Cuban Missile Crisis

Shortly after, McGee expressed concerns in the Senate about Soviet support for revolutionary movements in the Americas and remained wary of communism's spread in Cuba. He advocated for supporting reform movements and cautioned against provocative rhetoric towards Cuba.

After a wave of airline hijackings by Cuban nationals in 1961, McGee advised distinguishing between minor incidents and serious threats to avoid an unnecessary conflict. He downplayed Castro's significance, referring to Castro as a "pipsqueak" urging against overreaction.

In May 1962, McGee, in a televised discussion, expressed skepticism about the threat posed by missile sites in Cuba. During a visit to Guantanamo Bay in September, he voiced confidence in the U.S. policy of "watchful waiting." In October 1962, Vice President Lyndon Johnson, during a visit to Casper to help Joe Hickey's re-election efforts, privately warned McGee to temper his public statements, given the escalating situation just before the Cuban Missile Crisis.

In the 1970s, McGee shifted toward advocating for normalized U.S.-Cuba relations, challenging embargoes and sanctions as ineffective. He criticized the U.S. policy that required Cuba to sever ties with the Soviet Union as a precondition for better relations, considering it unrealistic. As a congressional leader, McGee held subcommittee hearings and proposed repealing outdated resolutions, pushing for a more diplomatic, flexible approach to engage with Cuba.

===== Dominican Republic =====
In 1965, the Dominican Civil War broke out between the government of President Donald Reid Cabral and supporters of former President Juan Bosch. Johnson dispatched over 20,000 Marines to the Dominican Republic. McGee believed that the U.S. intervention in the Dominican Republic was justified. He acknowledged the complexity of the situation and that there were good and bad people on both sides of the conflict. He emphasized that the intervention was necessary to save American lives and prevent a Communist takeover. He also highlighted the fact that U.S. forces evacuated more foreign nationals than Americans. He believed that the President's quick action was commendable and prevented a greater tragedy.

==== Middle East ====
===== Israel =====
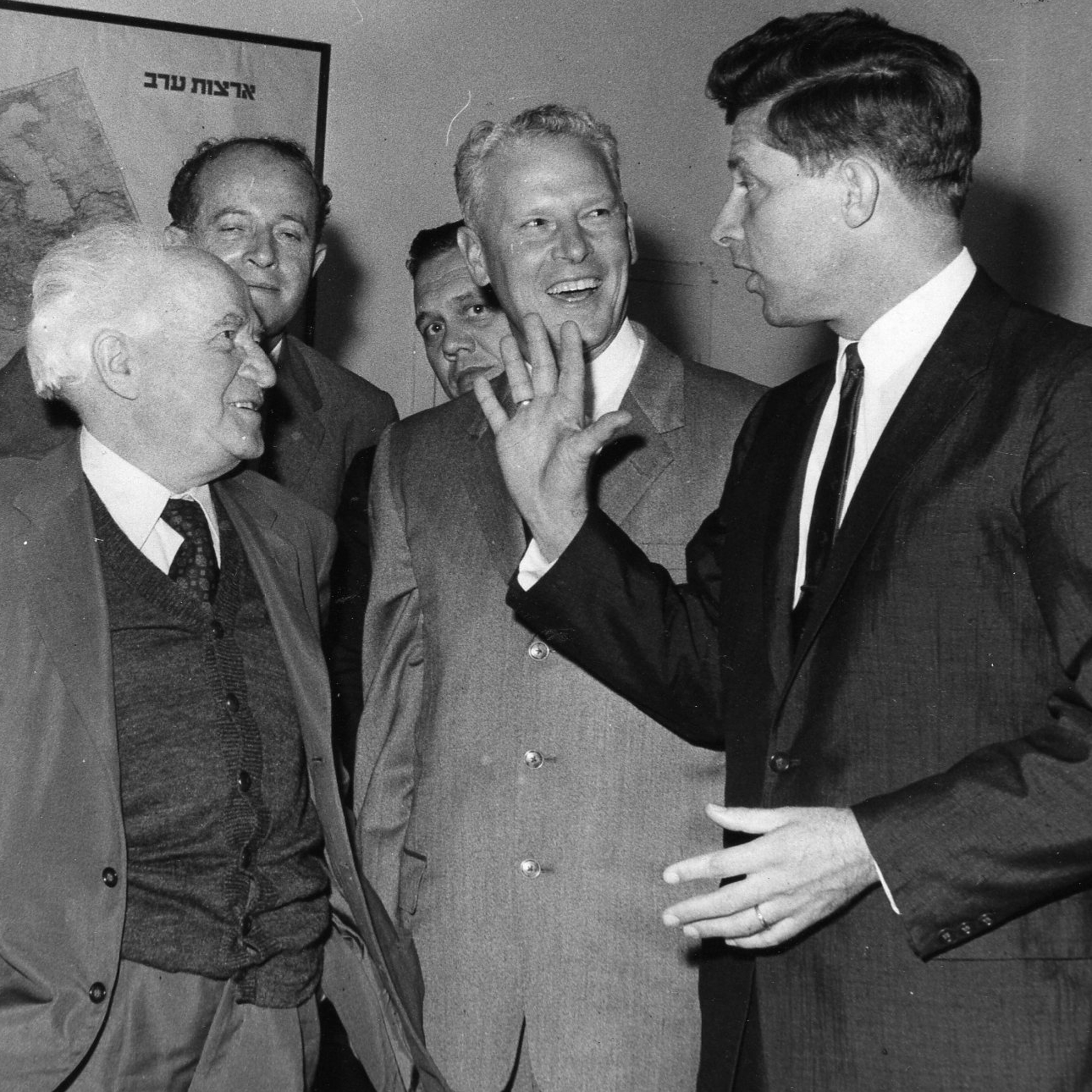
Senators Gale McGee (r) and Albert Gore Sr. (c) meet Prime Minister David Ben-Gurion (left) in Tel Aviv to discuss the Middle East refugee issue. Also pictured are Nahum Astar (back left) and Col. F. Rettchet (back right) during a foreign aid trip.

McGee consistently expressed strong support for Israel throughout his Senate career. He frequently spoke to Israel Bonds events throughout the United States. His views emphasized Israel's right to security and the U.S.'s obligation to assist Israel in the face of regional threats.

In 1959, McGee and Sen. Gore met with Israeli Prime Minister Ben Gurion on the issue of Palestinian refugees. Senator Gore expressed optimism about progress on the refugee issue based on his talks in the region. Ben Gurion was skeptical of Nasser's sincerity but agreed to consider a separate solution to the refugee question.

In 1970, he endorsed the idea of providing Israel with military aid, especially during and after the War of Attrition, to ensure its defense against neighboring countries, aligning with proposals from figures like Averell Harriman.

In 1971, McGee led a CODEL to the Middle East, where he and other Senators met with Prime Minister Golda Meir regarding Egypt's peace proposals after the Six-Day War. Meir emphasized the need to distinguish between outward appearances and substance in Egypt's attitude while explaining Israel's position on the issue of withdrawal from occupied territories.

McGee also condemned acts of violence against Israelis, such as the 1972 Munich Olympics tragedy, which he labeled "moral depravity."

McGee remained steadfast in advocating for military aid and diplomatic support, as seen in his 1973 speeches supporting increased foreign assistance for Israel, including additional funding for peacekeeping and military support. He expressed concern over extremism, particularly from groups like the Palestine Liberation Organization (PLO), and cautioned against policies that would compromise Israel's security. McGee also strongly criticized efforts at the U.N. to delegitimize Israel, notably opposing resolutions that condemned Zionism, seeing them as part of broader Arab efforts to undermine Israel's legitimacy.

In 1974, the Beth Jacob Teachers Training Institute in Jerusalem dedicated a wing in McGee's honor.

==== Peace Corps ====
S. 2000, Peace Corps bill, introduced by Senators Hubert H. Humphrey, Gale W. McGee and others, June 1, 1961

In 1959, McGee proposed sending 12 million students abroad, advocating for cultural exchange over military presence. During his 1960 presidential campaign, Senator John F. Kennedy gave an impromptu speech at the University of Michigan, urging students to serve their country by living and working in developing nations. After assuming office, President Kennedy signed Executive Order 10924, establishing the Peace Corps as a pilot program. He appointed his brother-in-law, Sargent Shriver, as its first director, tasking him with building the organization. McGee praised Shriver's appointment and, alongside Senator Hubert Humphrey, became an original cosponsor of S. 2000, the legislation formally creating the Peace Corps, signed into law in September 1961 McGee's steadfast belief in the Peace Corps’ potential to foster global goodwill was evident in his numerous Senate speeches and remarks. He consistently defended the program against criticism, emphasizing its vital role in promoting American values and ideals abroad.

==== Soviet Union ====
By the time he arrived in the Senate, McGee was already well-versed in U.S. policy towards the Soviet Union. His fellowship at the Council on Foreign Relations (CFR) in the early 1950s solidified his expertise on Soviet Policy. He wrote a paper, "Prospect for a More Tolerable Co-existence with the Soviet Union," emphasized shifting Cold War focus from Europe to Southeast Asia. He argued for recognizing Chinese independence from the Soviet Union, a unique perspective at the time. Stalin's death in 1953 prompted him to call for a reevaluation of U.S. policy towards the Soviet Union

In 1956, because of the connections he made during his CFR fellowship, McGee led a group of teachers on a trip to the Soviet Union; it was the first trip of its kind. It was a time when travel to the Soviet Union was not common, especially for non-diplomats. Notably, they gained access to a Volgograd Tractor Plant, an area off-limits to American officials, including Senator Henry "Scoop" Jackson who happened to be visiting the USSR at the same time. Upon his return, McGee and his wife shared their experiences through lectures and articles, generating significant interest among the Wyoming public. Despite initial concerns that the trip might negatively impact his political career, McGee found that the public's interest in the Soviet Union, heightened by the launch of Sputnik, made his experience a valuable asset.

While in the Senate, McGee consistently advocated for a nuanced understanding of the Soviet Union's motivations, emphasizing the importance of diplomacy and arms control while maintaining a strong national defense. McGee also expressed concerns about Soviet expansionism, particularly in the Indian Ocean, and supported a measured U.S. response to maintain regional balance.

===== Maiden speech =====
On February 19, 1959, just six weeks after taking office, McGee addressed the Senate. Introduced by Senator John F. Kennedy, he acknowledged the extraordinary responsibilities of new members due to their important committee assignments. He expressed that, given the pressing issues facing the nation, particularly regarding the Soviet Union and fiscal challenges, it was crucial for them to voice their perspectives. McGee advocated for a "war budget" in light of Khrushchev's threats and emphasized the U.S. should mobilize capitalism to address social issues and prove its superiority over Communism.

His speech was well received, marking McGee as a premier orator. Colleagues, including Edmund Muskie and John Kennedy, praised his ability to speak without a manuscript, a skill he would frequently demonstrate throughout his career. McGee's oratory became legendary, with requests for copies of his speeches flooding his office, often resulting in replies noting his preference for speaking without notes. His talent earned him recognition, including a feature in Esquire Magazine, which referred to him as the Senate's most brilliant speaker, drawing parallels between McGee's dramatic style and that of historical figures like Henry Clay.

===== Berlin Crisis of 1961 =====
The Berlin Crisis of 1961 was a Cold War standoff over Berlin's status, culminating in the erection of the Berlin Wall. Tensions rose in June 1961 when Soviet Premier Khrushchev demanded U.S., British, and French forces leave West Berlin. McGee believed that the Berlin Crisis is not just a conflict between the Soviet Union and the United States, but a global issue with the world watching. He stated that the U.S. policy regarding Berlin is fundamentally correct and strong but has not gone far enough. He believed that the U.S. has allowed the Russians to manipulate them into an unfavorable position and that they should put Russia's proposals to the test. He argued that by exposing the Russian position on Berlin, the U.S. can regain the initiative and inspire people around the world, particularly in Africa and Asia. He expressed regret that the U.S. did not take a more proactive role during the Hungarian revolt by proposing a special United Nations commission to be flown into Budapest. He believed that the U.S. has failed to effectively communicate its position to the rest of the world, which has resulted in a loss of standing globally. McGee visited Berlin twice in 1961. During a September visit, he appeared on the television program "All of America Wants to Know" with Senator Edmund Muskie, West Germany Mayor Willie Brandt, Sir William Hayter (Deputy Under Secretary of State for Great Britain), and Eugene Lyons (Reader's Digest Moscow correspondent). The program was filmed at the Brandenburg Gate. In October, one week before the standoff at Checkpoint Charlie, McGee was part of a Congressional Delegation to meet with Mayor Brandt and Allen Lightner

==== Support of U.S. Intelligence Community ====
In March 1967, Ramparts Magazine revealed links between the CIA and the National Student Association (NSA), raising concerns about CIA involvement in domestic issues. McGee defended the CIA's involvement in student groups. He argued that covert operations were necessary to compete with Soviet influence and that American youth groups could be effective ambassadors for the country.

A July 10, 1975 memo from then White House Chief of Staff Donald Rumsfeld to President Gerald Ford listed McGee as one of many potential candidates to be director of Central Intelligence. Rumsfeld listed "pros and cons" of each candidate (including George Bush, Lee Iacocca, and Byron White and others). The memo thought McGee was a strong defender of the intelligence community, respected within the foreign affairs community, and well-regarded for his independence. On November 4, 1975, William Colby was replaced as CIA Director by George Bush in a major shakeup of President Ford's administration termed the Halloween Massacre.

==== Re-election campaigns ====
===== 1964 election =====
McGee re-election campaign received strong support from both President Kennedy and President Johnson. In September 1963, Kennedy visited Wyoming delivering a speech at the University of Wyoming that encouraged public service and addressed resource use, fiscal policy, and the space race. . Days before Kennedy's assassination, McGee met with him to record campaign materials.

In Wyoming's historically Republican landscape, the 1964 election was notable for Democrats nearly matching Republicans in funding and strategy. McGee, the only Democratic incumbent, was re-elected, and Democrats gained control of the state House and Wyoming's U.S. House seat. Republicans' narrow focus on defeating McGee weakened their broader campaign, while McGee discredited GOP policies, including support for right-to-work laws and Barry Goldwater. Lyndon Johnson also won Wyoming in 1964, no Democratic Presential nominee has won the state since. Organized labor and Democratic county organizations played crucial roles, with media and minority group participation, including Native Americans, boosting Democratic margins in urban areas.

===== 1970 election =====
In 1970, McGee's reelection was a top Republican target. GOP leaders recruited Congressman John Wold, whom McGee had defeated in 1964. Despite facing a Democratic primary challenger due to his support for the Vietnam War, McGee secured the nomination by over 24,000 votes.

Highlighting his Senate seniority and roles on key committees, McGee defended his record of securing over $349 million in federal aid for Wyoming, countering accusations of "big spending."

President Nixon privately advised Vice President Spiro Agnew to avoid directly criticizing McGee, noting his bipartisan support, including during a major postal strike. Agnew campaigned for Wold without naming McGee. The Denver Post criticized Agnew's approach, noting McGee's 69% alignment with Nixon's policies in 1969, compared to Wold's 49%.

McGee won reelection with 67,207 votes to Wold's 53,279, gaining ground in traditionally Republican areas, especially Natrona County, and maintaining strong support from organized labor.

===== 1976 election =====
In his 1976 bid for a fourth term, McGee was defeated by Republican challenger Malcolm Wallop, who ran an expensive television advertising campaign attacking McGee for, among other positions, his opposition to state right-to-work laws, and problems with the U.S. Postal Service, based on McGee's chairmanship of the U.S. Senate committee overseeing the Postal Service. The margin of defeat was almost ten percentage points.

==== Legislation signed into law ====
PL 86-444 - (S. 2434) An Act to revise the boundaries and change the name of the Fort Laramie National Monument April 29, 1960

PL 86-448 - (S.J. Res. 150) a Joint resolution permitting the Secretary of the Interior to continue to deliver water to lands in the Third Division, Riverton Federal reclamation project. May 6, 1960

PL 86-450 - (S. 1751) An Act to place certain lands on the Wind River Indian Reservation in Wyoming in trust status. May 6, 1960

PL 87-151 - (S. 1085) An Act to provide for the disposal of certain Federal property on the Minidoka project, Idaho; Shoshone project, Wyoming; and Yakima project, Washington. August 17, 1961

PL 87-175 - (S. 702) An Act to exchange certain lands in Wyoming with the town of Afton. August 30, 1961

PL 87-422 - (S. 875) An Act to authorize and direct the Secretary of Agriculture to convey to the State of Wyoming for agricultural purposes certain real property in Sweetwater County, WY. March 20, 1962

PL 87-479 - (S.J. Res 151) An Act Authorizing continued delivery of water for the years 1962 and 1963 to land of the third division, Riverton Federal reclamation project, Wyoming June 8, 1962

PL 87-516 - (S. 536) An Act to adjust certain irrigation charges against non-Indian-owned lands within the Wind River irrigation project, Wyoming

PL 88-10 - (S. 982) An Act permitting the Secretary of the Interior to continue to deliver water to lands in the third division, Riverton Reclamation Project, Wyoming. April 18, 1963

PL 88-291 - (S. 1299) An Act to defer certain operation and maintenance charges of the Eden Valley Irrigation and Drainage District March 26, 1964

PL 88-354 - (S.J. Res 71) a Joint resolution to authorize and direct the conduct by the Federal Trade Commission of a comprehensive investigation of chainstore practices which may be in violation of the antitrust laws. July 2, 1964

PL 88-494 - (S. 51) An Act to authorize the Secretary of Agriculture to relinquish to the State of Wyoming jurisdiction over those lands within the Medicine Bow National Forest known as the Pole Mountain District. August 26, 1964

PL 88-568 - (S. 770) An Act to provide for the construction, operation and maintenance of the Savery-Pot Hook, Bostwick Park, and Fruitland Mesa participating reclamation projects under the Colorado River Storage Project Act. September 2, 1964

PL 89-760 - (S. 84) An Act to provide for reimbursement to the State of Wyoming for improvements made on certain lands in Sweetwater County, Wyo., if and when such lands revert to the United States. November 5, 1966

PL 89-364 - (S.J. Res. 9) A Joint resolution to cancel any unpaid reimbursable construction costs of the Wind River Indian irrigation project, Wyoming, chargeable against certain non Indian lands. March 8, 1966

PL 89-763 - (S. 476) An Act to amend the act approved March 18, 1950, providing for the construction of airports in or in close proximity to national parks, national monuments, and national recreation areas, and for other purposes. November 5, 1966

PL 89-664 - (S. 491) An Act to provide for the establishment of the Bighorn Canyon National Recreation Area, and for other purposes. October 15, 1966

PL XX-XXX - (S. 554/H.R. 441) An Act authorizing the Administrator of Veterans' Affairs to convey certain property to the city of Cheyenne, Wyo. November 8, 1965

PL 89-387 - (S. 1404) Uniform Time Act of 1966, An Act to make uniform dates for daylight savings time. April 13, 1966

PL 89-70 - (S. 3046/H.R. 13161) Elementary and Secondary Education Act Amendments, To strengthen and improve programs of assistance for our elementary and secondary schools. November 3, 1966

== United States ambassador to the Organization of American States ==
After his defeat by Malcolm Wallop, McGee was nominated by President Jimmy Carter as United States ambassador to the Organization of American States.McGee's expertise on Latin America and support for the Panama Canal Treaties made him a strategic choice for the role. After approval by the Senate, he was sworn in on March 30, 1977, at a ceremony in the Roosevelt Room in the White House by Judge John Sirica. His former colleague from the U.S. Senate, Vice President Walter Mondale, was in attendance as were former U.S. secretaries of State Henry Kissinger and William P. Rogers, former United States Ambassador to South Vietnam Ellsworth Bunker, Under Secretary of State Warren Christopher, National Security Advisor Zbigniew Brzezinski, and senators John Sparkman and William Fulbright.

A central focus of McGee's tenure was the Panama Canal Treaty, which aimed to transfer control of the canal to Panama. McGee played an active role in advocating for the treaty's ratification, engaging in public debates and countering opposition from various groups. He emphasized the importance of cooperation with Panama for the canal's continued operation and security.

Another key issue during McGee's tenure was the U.S.'s financial contribution to the OAS. While there was pressure to reduce the U.S.'s share of the budget, McGee argued for maintaining a higher level of funding, citing its importance for U.S. influence and regional stability.

McGee also navigated the complex issue of human rights in Latin America, particularly given the prevalence of military rule in the region. He sought to encourage dialogue and progress on human rights while balancing the need for diplomatic relations with these countries.

McGee served until 1981, when J. William Middendorf, President Reagan's nominee, was sworn in as the new Ambassador.

=== Life after public service ===
In 1981, McGee formed Gale W. McGee Associates, a consulting firm specializing in international and public affairs activities. The firm offered a broad range of political and economic services to both domestic and international companies with a special emphasis on developing new business opportunities with the nations of Latin America and the Caribbean. He was also president of the consulting firm of Moss, McGee, Bradley, Kelly & Foley, which was created with former U.S. Senator Frank Moss. McGee later served as president of the American League for Exports and Security Assistance, Inc. in 1986. He was a senior consultant at Hill & Knowlton, Inc. from 1987 to 1989.

In 1985, Gale McGee was appointed by Secretary of State George Shultz to the Indochina Refugee Panel to review US policy on Indochinese refugees. The panel's investigation revealed a significant refugee crisis, with 1.6 million Indochinese refugees already settled in the US and another 180,000 living in camps. The panel found that the primary cause of the refugee flows was the oppressive policies of the Socialist Republic of Vietnam. The panel recommended a pathway to citizenship for refugees already in the US, expedited admission for Amerasian children fathered by US servicemen, and action to secure the release of former South Vietnamese officials imprisoned in re-education camps. McGee worked with Senator Alan Simpson to include some of the panel's key recommendations in a major immigration reform bill.

The Papers of Gale McGee are housed at the University of Wyoming's American Heritage Center. Collection includes digital materials relating to McGee's career as a U.S. senator, his work at the University of Wyoming and the Organization of American States, and his post public service and personal life.

== Personal life ==
McGee married Loraine Baker in 1939 and together they had four children. Senator McGee died on April 9, 1992, in Washington, D.C. He is buried in Oak Hill Cemetery in Washington, D.C.

== Posthumous recognition ==
=== Congressional ===
In January 2007, the Wyoming congressional delegation introduced federal legislation (H.R. 335, S. 219) to rename the U.S. Post Office in Laramie, Wyoming as the "Gale W. McGee Post Office." The United States House of Representatives passed the legislation by voice vote on January 29, 2007. The United States Senate passed the legislation by Unanimous consent on February 7, 2007. The President signed the bill into law on March 7, 2007.

=== Biography ===
In 2018, Potomac Books/Nebraska press published McGee's biography, The Man in the Arena: The Life and Times of U.S. Senator Gale McGee written by Rodger McDaniel. The book won Best Nonfiction Book of the Year from the Wyoming State Historical Society.

=== Movie portrayal ===
McGee was portrayed by Harry Groener in the 2023 film Oppenheimer.

Party political offices
Preceded by Joseph C. O'Mahoney	Democratic nominee for U.S. senator from Wyoming (Class 1); 1958, 1964, 1970, 1976	Succeeded by Rodger McDaniel
U.S. Senate
Preceded by Frank A. Barrett	U.S. senator (Class 1) from Wyoming; 1959–1977; Served alongside: Joseph C. O'Mahoney, John J. Hickey, Milward L. Simpson, Clifford P. Hansen	Succeeded by Malcolm Wallop
Diplomatic posts
Preceded by William S. Mailliard	Permanent Representative of the United States to the Organization of American States; 1977–1981	Succeeded by J. William Middendorf
