= 1958 Texas lieutenant gubernatorial election =

- November 4, 1958
Nominee	Ben Ramsey
Party	Democratic
Popular vote	683,683
Percentage	96.73%
Lieutenant Governor before election
Ben Ramsey
Democratic
Elected Lieutenant Governor
Ben Ramsey
Democratic

The 1958 Texas lieutenant gubernatorial election was held on November 4, 1958, in order to elect the lieutenant governor of Texas. Incumbent Democratic lieutenant governor Ben Ramsey defeated Constitution nominee Philip Lee Eubank.

== General election ==
On election day, November 4, 1958, incumbent Democratic lieutenant governor Ben Ramsey won re-election by a margin of 660,584 votes against his opponent Constitution nominee Philip Lee Eubank, thereby retaining Democratic control over the office of lieutenant governor. Ramsey was sworn in for his fifth term on January 20, 1959.

=== Results ===
Texas lieutenant gubernatorial election, 1958
Party	Candidate	Votes	%
Democratic	Ben Ramsey (incumbent)	683,683	96.73
Constitution	Philip Lee Eubank	23,099	3.27
Total votes		706,782	100.00
Democratic hold			
