= 1958 California lieutenant gubernatorial election =

- November 4, 1958
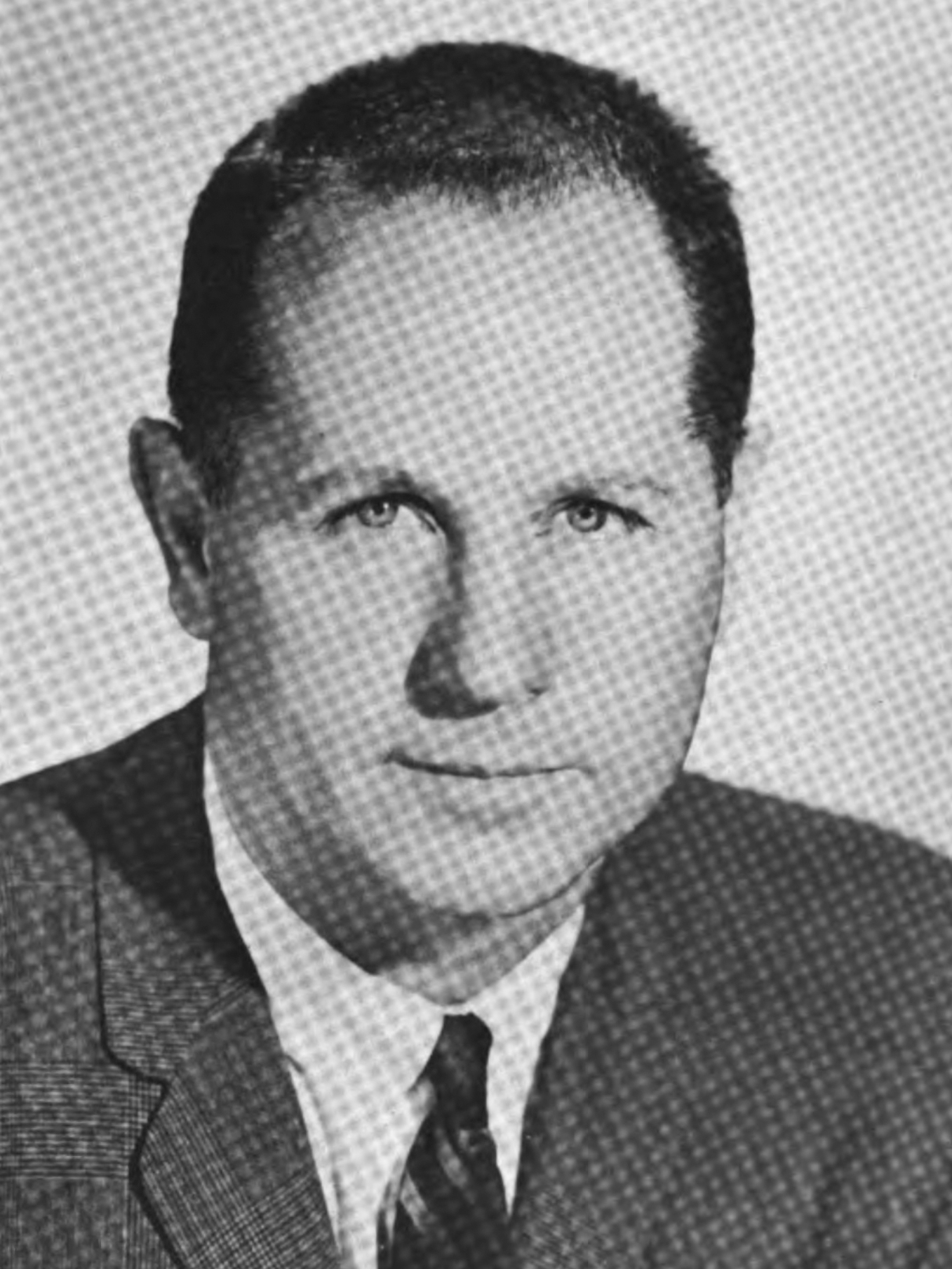

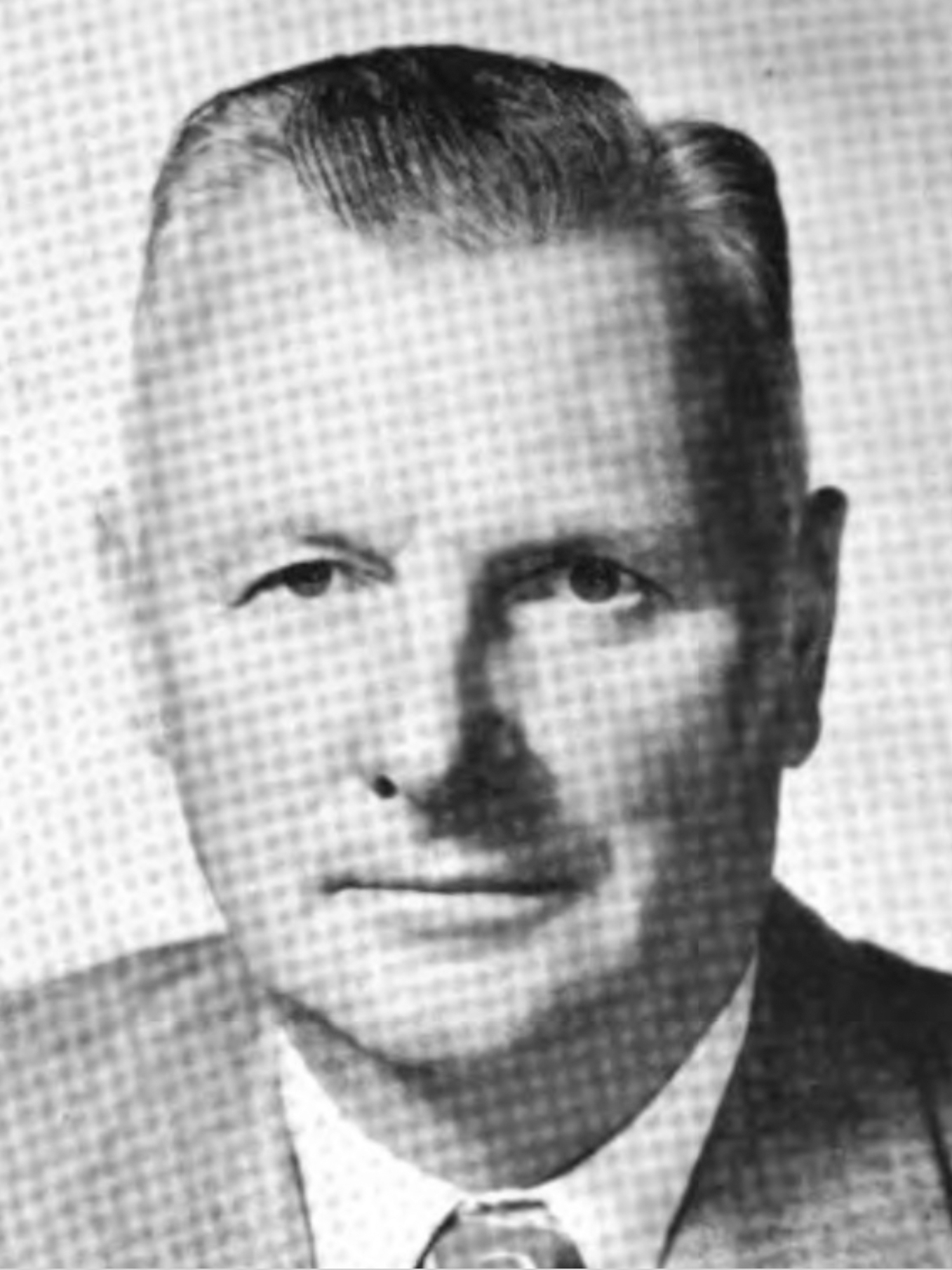
Nominee	Glenn M. Anderson	Harold J. Powers
Party	Democratic	Republican
Popular vote	2,626,626	2,536,396
Percentage	50.87%	49.13%
- County results Anderson: 50–60% 60–70% Powers: 50–60% 60–70% 70–80%
Lieutenant Governor before election
Harold J. Powers
Republican
Elected Lieutenant Governor
Glenn M. Anderson
Democratic

The 1958 California lieutenant gubernatorial election was held on November 4, 1958. Democratic nominee Glenn M. Anderson narrowly defeated incumbent Republican Harold J. Powers with 50.87% of the vote.

== General election ==
=== Candidates ===
- Glenn M. Anderson, Democratic
- Harold J. Powers, Republican

=== Results ===
1958 California lieutenant gubernatorial election
Party	Candidate	Votes	%	±%
Democratic	Glenn M. Anderson	2,626,626	50.87%	+6.21%
Republican	Harold J. Powers (incumbent)	2,536,396	49.13%	−6.21%
Majority		90,230		
Turnout				
Democratic gain from Republican		Swing		
