= T. E. Duffie =

Canadian politician

Member of the Legislative Assembly of New Brunswick
- In office 1960–1963
- Constituency: Victoria

Personal details
- Born: April 3, 1917 Oromocto, New Brunswick
- Died: 1977 (aged 59–60)
- Party: New Brunswick Liberal Association
- Spouse: Marie Dorina Breault
- Children: 3
- Occupation: Lawyer

Theodore Francis Edward Duffie (April 3, 1917 – 1977) was a Canadian politician. He served in the Legislative Assembly of New Brunswick from 1960 to 1963 as member of the Liberal party.
