= 1958 Soviet Union legislative election =

- 16 March 1958
- Soviet of the Union
- All 738 seats in the Soviet of the Union
Party	Seats	+/–
Communist Party	563	−2
Independents	175	+32
This lists parties that won seats. See the complete results below.
- Soviet of Nationalities
- All 640 seats in the Soviet of Nationalities
Party	Seats	+/–
Communist Party	485	0
Independents	155	+1
This lists parties that won seats. See the complete results below.
Chairman of the Council of Ministers before	Chairman of the Council of Ministers after
Nikolai Bulganin; CPSU	Nikita Khrushchev; CPSU

Supreme Soviet elections were held in the Soviet Union on 16 March 1958.

== Electoral system ==
Candidates had to be nominated by the Communist Party of the Soviet Union (CPSU) or by a public organisation. However, all public organisations were controlled by the party and were subservient to a 1931 law that required them to accept party rule. The CPSU itself remained the only legal one in the country.

Voters could vote against the CPSU candidate, but could only do so by using polling booths, whereas votes for the party could be cast simply by submitting a blank ballot. Turnout was required to be over 50% for the election to be valid.

== Candidates ==
CPSU candidates accounted for around three quarters of the nominees, whilst many of the others were members of Komsomol.

== Results ==
=== Soviet of the Union ===
Party or alliance		Votes	%	Seats	+/–
BKB	Communist Party of the Soviet Union	133,214,652	99.57	563	–2
BKB	Independents	133,214,652	99.57	175	+32
Against		580,641	0.43	–	–
Total		133,795,293	100.00	738	+30
Valid votes		133,795,293	100.00		
Invalid/blank votes		798	0.00		
Total votes		133,796,091	100.00		
Registered voters/turnout		133,836,325	99.97		
Source: Nohlen & Stöver

=== Soviet of Nationalities ===
Party or alliance		Votes	%	Seats	+/–
BKB	Communist Party of the Soviet Union	133,431,524	99.73	485	0
BKB	Independents	133,431,524	99.73	155	+1
Against		363,736	0.27	–	–
Total		133,795,260	100.00	640	+1
Valid votes		133,795,260	100.00		
Invalid/blank votes		831	0.00		
Total votes		133,796,091	100.00		
Registered voters/turnout		133,836,325	99.97		
Source: Nohlen & Stöver
