= 1958 Swiss referendums =

Seven referendums were held in Switzerland during 1958. The first was held on 26 January on a popular initiative "against the abuse of economic power", concerning unfair competition, and was rejected by voters. The second was held on 11 May on the federal budget, and was approved by voters. The third and fourth were held on 6 July on introducing a new section 27ter to the constitution concerning films, and a petition to improve the road network, both of which were approved. The fifth referendum was held on 26 October on instituting a 44-hour working week, and was rejected by voters. The final two were held on 7 December on a constitutional amendment on gambling and approving a treaty with Italy on a hydroelectric power scheme on the River Spöl, with both approved.

== Results ==
=== January: Unfair competition ===
Choice	Popular vote		Cantons		
Choice	Votes	%	Full	Half	Total
For	197,297	25.9	0	0	0
Against	550,322	74.1	19	6	22
Blank votes	17,409	–	–	–	–
Invalid votes	1,365	–	–	–	–
Total	761,393	100	19	6	22
Registered voters/turnout	1,469,853	51.8	–	–	–
Source: Nohlen & Stöver

=== May: Federal budget ===
Choice	Popular vote		Cantons		
Choice	Votes	%	Full	Half	Total
For	419,265	54.6	15	5	17.5
Against	348,905	45.4	4	1	4.5
Blank votes	13,480	–	–	–	–
Invalid votes	1,292	–	–	–	–
Total	782,942	100	19	6	22
Registered voters/turnout	1,471,221	53.2	–	–	–
Source: Nohlen & Stöver

=== July: Constitutional amendment on films ===
Choice	Popular vote		Cantons		
Choice	Votes	%	Full	Half	Total
For	362,806	61.3	18	5	20.5
Against	229,433	38.7	1	1	1.5
Blank votes	30,285	–	–	–	–
Invalid votes	1,039	–	–	–	–
Total	623,563	100	19	6	22
Registered voters/turnout	1,472,828	42.3	–	–	–
Source: Nohlen & Stöver

=== July: Road network improvements ===
Choice	Popular vote		Cantons		
Choice	Votes	%	Full	Half	Total
For	515,396	85.0	18	6	21
Against	91,238	15.0	1	0	1
Blank votes	17,024	–	–	–	–
Invalid votes	935	–	–	–	–
Total	624,593	100	19	6	22
Registered voters/turnout	1,472,828	42.4	–	–	–
Source: Nohlen & Stöver

=== October: 44-hour working week ===
Choice	Popular vote		Cantons		
Choice	Votes	%	Full	Half	Total
For	315,790	35.0	0	1	0.5
Against	586,818	65.0	19	5	21.5
Blank votes	9,112	–	–	–	–
Invalid votes	1,613	–	–	–	–
Total	913,333	100	19	6	22
Registered voters/turnout	1,476,963	61.8	–	–	–
Source: Nohlen & Stöver

=== December: Constitutional amendment on gambling ===
Choice	Popular vote		Cantons		
Choice	Votes	%	Full	Half	Total
For	392,620	59.9	18	5	20.5
Against	262,905	40.1	1	1	1.5
Blank votes	26,268	–	–	–	–
Invalid votes	1,143	–	–	–	–
Total	682,936	100	19	6	22
Registered voters/turnout	1,477,043	46.2	–	–	–
Source: Nohlen & Stöver

=== December: Hydroelectric power treaty with Italy ===
Choice	Votes	%
For	501,170	75.2
Against	165,473	24.8
Blank votes	17,612	–
Invalid votes	1,178	–
Total	685,433	100
Registered voters/turnout	1,477,043	46.4
Source: Nohlen & Stöver
