= 1958 Connecticut lieutenant gubernatorial election =

- November 4, 1958
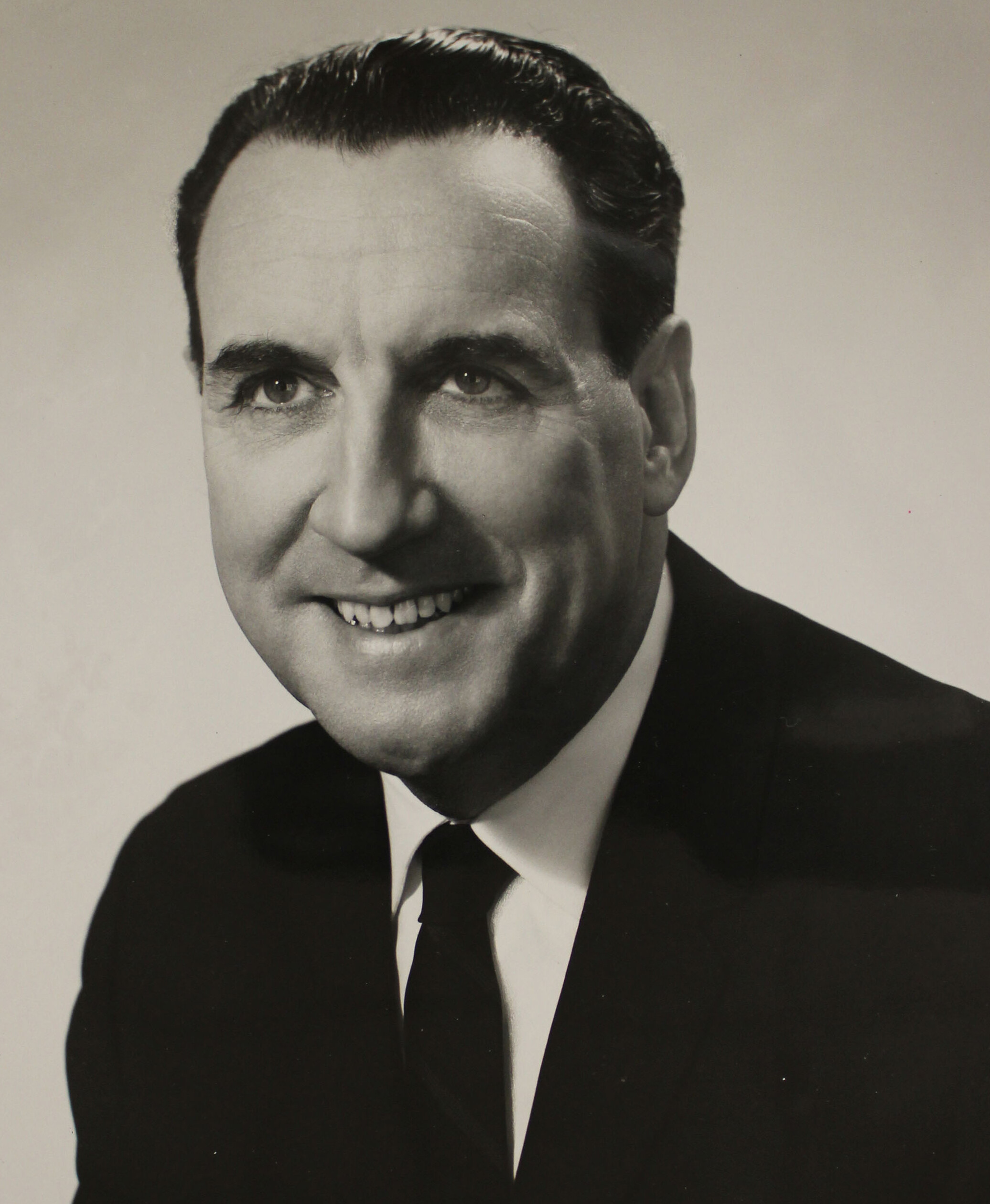

Nominee	John N. Dempsey	Stephen J. Sweeney
Party	Democratic	Republican
Popular vote	569,982	399,264
Percentage	58.81%	41.19%
- Dempsey: 40–50% 50–60% 60–70% 70–80% Sweeney: 50–60% 60–70% 70–80% 80–90%
Lieutenant Governor before election
Charles W. Jewett
Republican
Elected Lieutenant Governor
John N. Dempsey
Democratic

The 1958 Connecticut lieutenant gubernatorial election was held on November 4, 1958. Incumbent Republican lieutenant-governor Charles W. Jewett chose not to seek re-election to a second term.

Democrat John N. Dempsey defeated Republican nominee Stephen J. Sweeney with 58.8% of the vote.

== Democratic primary ==
=== Candidates ===
==== Nominee ====
- John N. Dempsey, mayor of Putnam, former state representative from Putnam, candidate for this seat in 1954, and executive aide to governor Abraham Ribicoff.

==== Withdrew ====
- Henry D. Altobello, mayor of Meriden.

== General election ==
=== Candidates ===
- Democratic: John N. Dempsey, mayor of Putnam, former state representative from Putnam, and executive aide to governor Abraham Ribicoff.
- Republican: Stephen J. Sweeney, state Senator from the 14th district.

=== Results ===
1958 Connecticut lieutenant gubernatorial election
Party	Candidate	Votes	%
Democratic	John N. Dempsey	569,982	58.81%
Republican	Stephen J. Sweeney	399,264	41.19%
Total votes		969,246	100.00%
Democratic gain from Republican			
