= 1964 United States Senate election in Wyoming =

- November 3, 1964
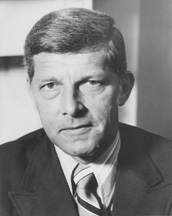

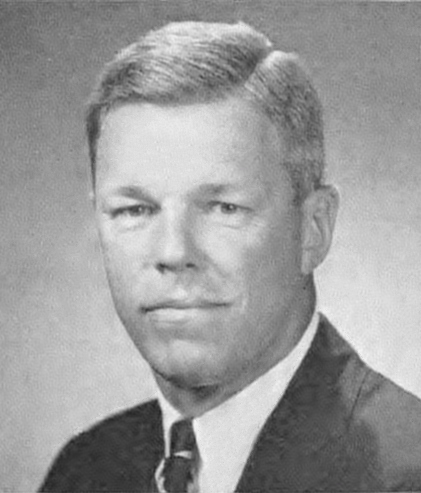
Nominee	Gale W. McGee	John S. Wold
Party	Democratic	Republican
Popular vote	76,485	65,185
Percentage	53.99%	46.01%
- County results McGee: 50–60% 60–70% 70–80% Wold: 50–60% 60–70%
U.S. senator before election
Gale W. McGee
Democratic
Elected U.S. Senator
Gale W. McGee
Democratic

The 1964 United States Senate election in Wyoming took place on November 3, 1964. Incumbent Democratic senator Gale W. McGee ran for re-election to his second term. In the general election, he faced Republican nominee John S. Wold, the former chairman of the Republican Party of Wyoming and a former state representative. Despite Wyoming's long conservative streak, McGee was aided by the strong performance by President Lyndon B. Johnson in Wyoming. McGee ended up winning re-election by a relatively narrow, but decisive, margin, beating Wold 54% to 46%.

== Democratic primary ==
=== Candidates ===
- Gale W. McGee, incumbent U.S. senator
- I. Wayne "Bud" Kinney, former chairman of the Benjamin Franklin Party

=== Results ===
Democratic primary
Party	Candidate	Votes	%
Democratic	Gale McGee (inc.)	39,140	89.62%
Democratic	I. Wayne "Bud" Kinney	4,535	10.38%
Total votes		43,675	100.00%

== Republican primary ==
=== Candidates ===
- John S. Wold, former chairman of the Republican Party of Wyoming, former state representative
- Kenny Sailors, basketball player, former state representative, 1962 Republican candidate for the U.S. Senate

=== Results ===
Republican primary
Party	Candidate	Votes	%
Republican	John S. Wold	23,278	51.96%
Republican	Kenny Sailors	21,522	48.04%
Total votes		44,800	100.00%

== General election ==
=== Results ===
1964 United States Senate election in Wyoming
Party	Candidate	Votes	%	±%
Democratic	Gale W. McGee (inc.)	76,485	53.99%	+3.15%
Republican	John S. Wold	65,185	46.01%	−3.15%
Majority		11,300	7.98%	+6.30%
Turnout		141,670		
Democratic hold				
