= 1958 United States Senate election in Wyoming =

- November 4, 1958
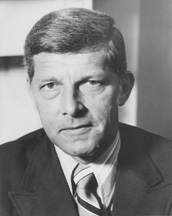

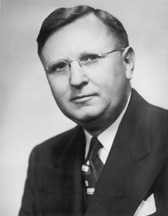
| Nominee | Gale W. McGee | Frank A. Barrett |
| Party | Democratic | Republican |
| Popular vote | 58,035 | 56,122 |
| Percentage | 50.84% | 49.16% |
- County results McGee: 50–60% 60–70% 70–80% Barrett: 50–60% 60–70%
U.S. senator before election
Frank A. Barrett
Republican
Elected U.S. Senator
Gale W. McGee
Democratic

The 1958 United States Senate election in Wyoming took place November 4, 1958. Incumbent Republican Senator Frank A. Barrett ran for re-election to his second term. He was challenged by Gale W. McGee, a University of Wyoming professor and the Democratic nominee. Despite the state's strong Republican lean, McGee ran an energetic campaign against Barrett, earning the support of the national Democratic establishment. McGee ultimately narrowly upset Barrett, winning 51% of the vote to Barrett's 49%.

== Democratic primary ==
=== Candidates ===
- Gale W. McGee, University of Wyoming professor, former aide to Senator Joseph C. O'Mahoney
- Hepburn T. Armstrong, businessman

=== Results ===
Democratic primary
| Party | Candidate | Votes | % |
|---|---|---|---|
| Democratic | Gale McGee | 22,098 | 59.53% |
| Democratic | Hepburn T. Armstrong | 15,024 | 40.47% |
| Total votes | | 37,122 | 100.00% |

== Republican primary ==
=== Candidates ===
- Frank A. Barrett, Incumbent U.S. Senator

=== Results ===
Republican primary
| Party | Candidate | Votes | % |
|---|---|---|---|
| Republican | Frank A. Barrett (inc.) | 35,444 | 100.00% |
| Total votes | | 35,444 | 100.00% |

== General election ==
=== Results ===
1958 United States Senate election in Wyoming
| Party | Candidate | Votes | % | ±% |
|---|---|---|---|---|
| Democratic | Gale W. McGee | 58,035 | 50.84% | +2.47% |
| Republican | Frank A. Barrett (inc.) | 56,122 | 49.16% | −2.47% |
| Majority | | 1,913 | 1.68% | −1.59% |
| Turnout | | 114,157 | | |
| Democratic gain from Republican | | | | |

== Endorsements ==
Barrett endorsements

Cabinet officials

- Ezra Taft Benson, 13th United States Secretary of Agriculture (1953–1961)
- Richard Nixon, 36th Vice President of the United States (1953–1961)
- Fred A. Seaton, 36th United States Secretary of the Interior (1956–1961)

U.S. Senators

- Everett Dirksen, U.S. Senator from Illinois (1951–1969)
- Roman Hruska, U.S. Senator from Nebraska (1954–1976)
- Karl Mundt, U.S. Senator from South Dakota (1948–1973)
McGee endorsements

U.S. Presidents

- Harry S. Truman, 33rd President of the United States (1945–1953)

U.S. Senators

- Lyndon B. Johnson, U.S. Senator from Texas (1949–1961)
- John F. Kennedy, U.S. Senator from Massachusetts (1953–1960)
- Edmund Muskie, U.S. Senator from Maine (1959–1980)
- Joseph Montoya, U.S. Senator from New Mexico (1964–1977)
- Wayne Morse, U.S. Senator from Oregon (1945–1969)
- Joseph C. O'Mahoney, U.S. Senator from Wyoming (1934–1953; 1954–1961)

== Works cited ==
- Trachsel, Herman (1959). "The 1958 Election in Wyoming". The Western Political Quarterly. 12 (1). University of Utah: 363–66. doi:10.2307/444064. JSTOR 444064.
