= 1966 Wyoming gubernatorial election =

- November 8, 1966
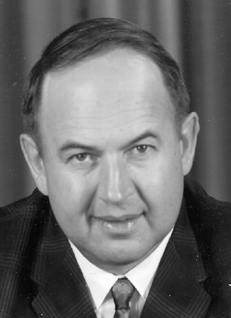

Nominee	Stanley Hathaway	Ernest Wilkerson
Party	Republican	Democratic
Popular vote	65,624	55,249
Percentage	54.29%	45.71%
- County results Hathaway: 50–60% 60–70% 70–80% Wilkerson: 50–60% 60–70%
Governor before election
Clifford Hansen
Republican
Elected Governor
Stanley Hathaway
Republican

The 1966 Wyoming gubernatorial election took place on November 8, 1966. Incumbent Republican Governor Clifford Hansen declined to seek a second term, instead opting to run for the U.S. Senate. Stanley Hathaway, the former Goshen County Prosecuting Attorney, won the Republican primary, and faced attorney Ernest Wilkerson, the Democratic nominee, in the general election. Despite the unfavorable national environment for Democratic candidates, Wilkerson was able to improve on Democrats' performance from the 1962 election, but not enough to defeat Hathaway, who won the election by a decisive margin.

== Democratic primary ==
=== Candidates ===
- Ernest Wilkerson, attorney
- Bill Nation, State Representative
- Jack R. Gage, former Governor of Wyoming
- Raymond B. Whitaker, former Natrona County Prosecuting Attorney, 1960 Democratic nominee for U.S. Senate
- Howard Burke, State Representative

Democratic primary results
Party	Candidate	Votes	%
Democratic	Ernest Wilkerson	13,145	31.07%
Democratic	Bill Nation	9,834	23.35%
Democratic	Jack R. Gage	8,661	20.47%
Democratic	Raymond B. Whitaker	6,238	14.75%
Democratic	Howard Burke	4,426	10.46%
Total votes		42,926	100.00%

== Republican primary ==
=== Candidates ===
- Stanley Hathaway, former Goshen County Prosecuting Attorney
- Joe Burke, former State Representative
- Arthur E. Linde, businessman

Republican primary results
Party	Candidate	Votes	%
Republican	Stanley Hathaway	26,110	55.24%
Republican	Joe Burke	19,815	41.92%
Republican	Arthur E. Linde	1,344	2.84%
Total votes		47,269	100.00%

== Results ==
1966 Wyoming gubernatorial election
Party	Candidate	Votes	%	±%
Republican	Stanley Hathaway	65,624	54.29%	−0.18%
Democratic	Ernest Wilkerson	55,249	45.71%	+0.18%
Majority		10,375	8.58%	−0.36%
Turnout		120,873		
Republican hold				
