= 1962 Wyoming gubernatorial election =

- November 7, 1962
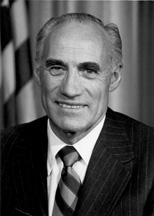

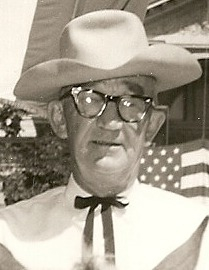
Nominee	Clifford Hansen	Jack R. Gage
Party	Republican	Democratic
Popular vote	64,970	54,298
Percentage	54.47%	45.53%
- County results Hansen: 50–60% 60–70% 70–80% 80–90% Cage: 50–60% 60–70%
Governor before election
Jack R. Gage
Democratic
Elected Governor
Clifford Hansen
Republican

The 1962 Wyoming gubernatorial election took place on November 7, 1962. Incumbent Democratic Governor Jack R. Gage, who ascended to the governorship after his predecessor, John J. Hickey, appointed himself to the U.S. Senate in 1961, ran for re-election. After beating back a strong challenge from former Secretary of State William M. Jack in the Democratic primary, he then faced Republican nominee Clifford Hansen, the President of the University of Wyoming Board of Trustees and a former Teton County Commissioner.

1962 proved poor for Wyoming Democrats, as Hansen handily defeated Gage and as incumbent John Hickey lost in the concurrent U.S. Senate special election by former Governor Milward Simpson. This is the last Wyoming gubernatorial election where the incumbent was defeated.

== Democratic primary ==
=== Candidates ===
- Jack R. Gage, incumbent Governor
- William M. Jack, former Secretary of State of Wyoming, 1954 Democratic nominee for Governor

Democratic primary results
Party	Candidate	Votes	%
Democratic	Jack R. Gage (inc.)	21,051	55.51%
Democratic	William Jack	16,875	44.49%
Total votes		37,926	100.00%

== Republican primary ==
=== Candidates ===
- Clifford Hansen, President of the University of Wyoming Board of Trustees and former Teton County Commissioner
- Charles M. Crowell, former State Representative
- R. E. Cheever, former Mayor of Cheyenne

Republican primary results
Party	Candidate	Votes	%
Republican	Clifford Hansen	28,494	57.02%
Republican	Charles M. Crowell	16,906	33.83%
Republican	R.E. Cheever	4,575	9.16%
Total votes		49,975	100.00%

== Results ==
1962 Wyoming gubernatorial election
Party	Candidate	Votes	%	±%
Republican	Clifford Hansen	64,970	54.47%	+7.83%
Democratic	Jack R. Gage (inc.)	54,298	45.53%	−3.41%
Majority		10,672	8.95%	+6.65%
Turnout		119,268		
Republican gain from Democratic				
