= 1978 United States Senate election in Wyoming =

- November 7, 1978
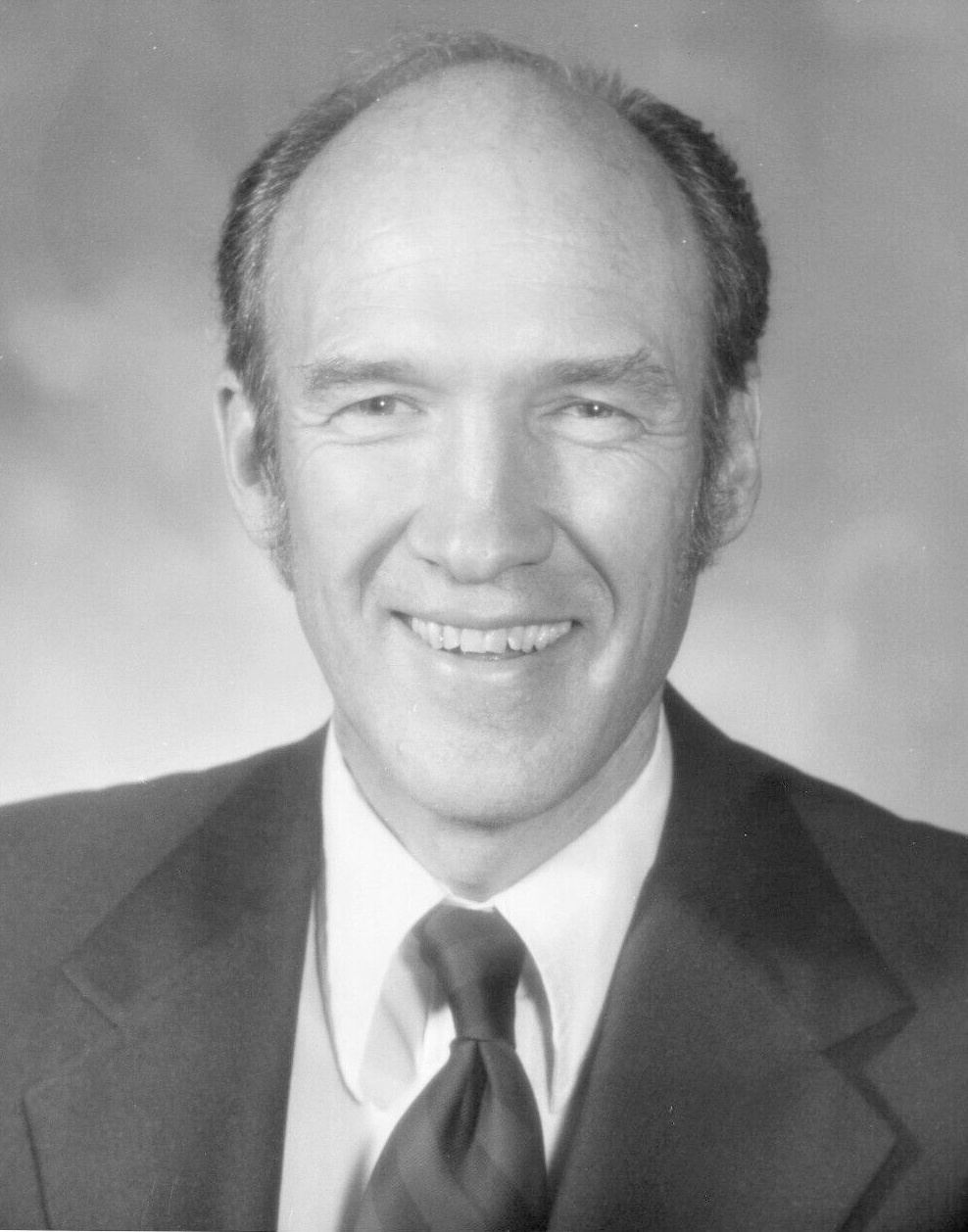

Nominee	Alan Simpson	Raymond B. Whitaker
Party	Republican	Democratic
Popular vote	82,908	50,456
Percentage	62.17%	37.83%
- County results Simpson: 50–60% 60–70% 70–80% Whitaker: 50–60%
U.S. senator before election
Clifford Hansen
Republican
Elected U.S. Senator
Alan K. Simpson
Republican

The 1978 United States Senate election in Wyoming was held on November 7, 1978. Incumbent Republican Senator Clifford Hansen declined to seek a third term in office. Former State Representative Alan K. Simpson, the son of former Senator Milward Simpson, won a contested Republican primary and faced Raymond B. Whitaker, the 1960 Democratic nominee for the Senate, in the general election. Despite a favorable environment for Republicans nationwide, Simpson's performance decreased considerably from Hansen's 1972 landslide. Nonetheless, he easily defeated Whitaker, winning 62% of the vote to Whitaker's 38%.

== Republican primary ==
=== Candidates ===
- Alan K. Simpson, former State Representative from Park County
- Hugh Binford, petroleum engineer and businessman
- Gordon H. Barrows, author
- James G. Maxey, project manager

=== Results ===
Republican primary
Party	Candidate	Votes	%
Republican	Alan K. Simpson	37,332	54.66%
Republican	Hugh Binford	20,768	30.41%
Republican	Gordon H. Barrows	8,494	12.44%
Republican	James G. Maxey	1,709	2.50%
Total votes		68,303	100.00%

== Democratic primary ==
=== Candidates ===
- Raymond B. Whitaker, former Natrona County Prosecuting Attorney, 1960 Democratic nominee for U.S. Senate
- Dean M. Larson, Riverton attorney
- Charles Carroll, former Deputy Wyoming Attorney General, 1974 Democratic nominee for Wyoming Secretary of State

=== Results ===
Democratic primary
Party	Candidate	Votes	%
Democratic	Raymond B. Whitaker	19,854	47.62%
Democratic	Dean M. Larson	11,039	26.48%
Democratic	Charles Carroll	10,797	25.90%
Total votes		41,690	100.00%

== General election ==
=== Results ===
1978 United States Senate election in Wyoming
Party	Candidate	Votes	%	±%
Republican	Alan Simpson	82,908	62.17%	−9.15%
Democratic	Raymond B. Whitaker	50,456	37.83%	+9.15%
Majority		32,452	24.33%	−18.30%
Turnout		133,364		
Republican hold				

== See also ==
- 1978 United States Senate elections
