= 1938 Wyoming state elections =

A general election was held in the U.S. state of Wyoming on Tuesday, November 8, 1938. All of the state's executive officers—the Governor, Secretary of State, Auditor, Treasurer, and Superintendent of Public Instruction—were up for election. After losing all of the statewide executive offices in 1934, Republicans made up some ground; they won elections for Governor, Treasurer, and Superintendent, while Secretary of State Lester C. Hunt and Auditor William M. Jack won decisive re-elections.

== Governor ==
1938 Wyoming gubernatorial election
Party	Candidate	Votes	%	±%
Republican	Nels H. Smith	57,288	59.81%	+18.44%
Democratic	Leslie A. Miller (inc.)	38,501	40.19%	−17.71%
Majority		18,787	19.61%	+3.07%
Turnout		95,789	100.00%	
Republican gain from Democratic				

== Secretary of State ==
Incumbent Secretary of State Lester C. Hunt ran for re-election to a second term. He was initially challenged by Doc Rogers, the former Deputy Secretary of State, but after the deadline, Rogers attempted to switch places on the ballot with W. K. Mylar, who was initially running for State Auditor. Hunt's office refused to allow Rogers to withdraw and be replaced by Mylar, but the state supreme court ordered the office to accept the filings. Accordingly, Hunt was challenged by Mylar, a physician. Despite the success of the Republican Party elsewhere in the state, Hunt had little difficulty defeating Mylar by a solid margin, winning his second term.

=== Democratic primary ===
==== Candidates ====
- Lester C. Hunt, incumbent Secretary of State

==== Results ====
Democratic Party primary results
Party	Candidate	Votes	%
Democratic	Lester C. Hunt (inc.)	31,086	100.00%
Total votes		31,086	100.00%

=== Republican primary ===
==== Candidates ====
- W. K. Mylar, physician, 1926 Republican candidate for Secretary of State

==== Results ====
Republican Primary results
Party	Candidate	Votes	%
Republican	W. K. Mylar	27,443	100.00%
Total votes		27,443	100.00%

=== General election ===
==== Results ====
1938 Wyoming Secretary of State election
Party	Candidate	Votes	%	±%
Democratic	Lester C. Hunt (inc.)	50,227	54.61%	−1.13%
Republican	W. K. Mylar	41,741	45.39%	+1.89%
Majority		8,486	9.23%	−3.02%
Turnout		91,968		
Democratic hold				

== Auditor ==
Incumbent Democratic Auditor William M. Jack ran for re-election to a second term. He was initially challenged by physician W. K. Mylar, but the Republican Party successfully substituted Doc Rogers for Mylar after filing closed following a successful court challenge.

=== Democratic primary ===
==== Candidates ====
- William M. Jack, incumbent State Auditor

==== Results ====
Democratic Party primary results
Party	Candidate	Votes	%
Democratic	William M. Jack (inc.)	30,470	100.00%
Total votes		30,470	100.00%

=== Republican primary ===
==== Candidates ====
- Doc Rogers, former Deputy Secretary of State

==== Results ====
Republican Primary results
Party	Candidate	Votes	%
Republican	Doc Rogers	26,975	100.00%
Total votes		26,975	100.00%

=== General election ===
==== Results ====
1934 Wyoming Auditor election
Party	Candidate	Votes	%	±%
Democratic	William M. Jack (inc.)	49,869	54.31%	−3.37%
Republican	Doc Rogers	41,948	45.69%	+3.37%
Majority		7,921	8.63%	−6.75%
Turnout		91,817		
Democratic hold				

== Treasurer ==
Incumbent Democratic State Treasurer J. Kirk Baldwin was barred from seeking a second term due to term limits. Pat Flannery, the Chairman of the Wyoming Democratic Party, won a close primary to succeed Baldwin and advanced to the general election, where he faced Republican Matt Christensen, the former Deputy Assessor of Carbon County. Ultimately, Christensen defeated Flannery by a slim margin, flipping the Treasurer's office back to the Republican Party.

=== Democratic primary ===
==== Candidates ====
- Pat Flannery, Chairman of the Wyoming Democratic Party, former State Representative, 1934 Democratic candidate for Secretary of State
- Frank Clark, Cheyenne businessman
- Perry Williams, rancher

==== Results ====
Democratic Party primary results
Party	Candidate	Votes	%
Democratic	Pat Flannery	15,042	45.59%
Democratic	Frank Clark	14,085	42.69%
Democratic	Perry Williams	3,870	11.73%
Total votes		32,997	100.00%

=== Republican primary ===
==== Candidates ====
- Matt Christensen, former Carbon County Deputy Assessor

==== Results ====
Republican Primary results
Party	Candidate	Votes	%
Republican	Matt Christensen	27,287	100.00%
Total votes		27,287	100.00%

=== General election ===
==== Results ====
1938 Wyoming Treasurer election
Party	Candidate	Votes	%	±%
Republican	Matt Christensen	47,334	52.02%	+11.27%
Democratic	Pat Flannery	43,661	47.98%	−11.05
Majority		3,673	4.04%	−14.24%
Turnout		90,995		
Republican gain from Democratic				

== Superintendent of Public Instruction ==
Incumbent Democratic Superintendent of Public Instruction Jack R. Gage ran for re-election to a second term. Following his narrow victory in the 1934 Democratic primary, he faced an intraparty challenge from one of his 1934 opponents, Maude Sholty. However, he defeated Sholty by a wide margin and advanced to the general election, where he was opposed by Republican nominee Esther L. Anderson, a junior high school teacher. Despite Gage's large victory four years earlier, he fell victim to the strong Republican performance in Wyoming and narrowly lost re-election to Anderson.

=== Democratic primary ===
==== Candidates ====
- Jack R. Gage, Sheridan teacher
- Maude Sholty, former State Director of Special Education, 1934 Democratic candidate for Superintendent

==== Results ====
Democratic Party primary results
Party	Candidate	Votes	%
Democratic	Jack R. Gage (inc.)	21,606	65.45%
Democratic	Maude Sholty	11,406	34.55%
Total votes		33,012	100.00%

=== Republican primary ===
==== Candidates ====
- Esther L. Anderson, junior high school teacher

==== Results ====
Republican Party primary results
Party	Candidate	Votes	%
Republican	Esther L. Anderson	26,908	100.00%
Total votes		26,908	100.00%

=== General election ===
==== Results ====
1938 Wyoming Superintendent of Public Instruction election
Party	Candidate	Votes	%	±%
Republican	Esther L. Anderson	48,449	52.63%	+13.57%
Democratic	Jack R. Gage (inc.)	43,606	47.37%	−13.57%
Majority		4,843	5.26%	−16.62%
Turnout		92,055		
Republican gain from Democratic				
