= 1962 United States Senate special election in Wyoming =

- November 6, 1962
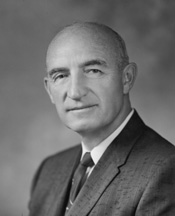

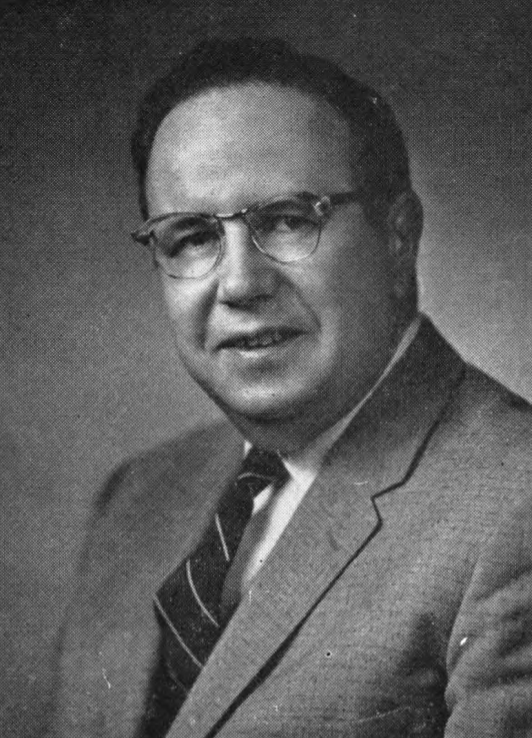
Nominee	Milward Simpson	John J. Hickey
Party	Republican	Democratic
Popular vote	69,043	50,329
Percentage	57.84%	42.16%
- County results Simpson: 50–60% 60–70% 70–80% Hickey: 50–60% 60–70%
U.S. senator before election
John J. Hickey
Democratic
Elected U.S. Senator
Milward Simpson
Republican

The 1962 United States Senate special election in Wyoming was held on November 6, 1962. This election was prompted by the death of Senator-elect Keith Thomson, who had been elected to the Senate in 1960. After his death Democratic Governor John J. Hickey appointed himself to fill the vacancy. A special election was then held to complete the remaining four years of the term in 1962. Hickey faced a strong challenge from former Republican Governor Milward Simpson in a rematch of the 1958 gubernatorial election. Despite a nationwide political environment that was largely favorable to Democrats, Democratic candidates faced strong opposition in Wyoming. Ultimately, Senator Hickey overwhelmingly lost his bid for re-election to Simpson, while Democratic Governor Jack R. Gage also lost re-election by a wide margin. Hickey was the last Democratic Senator from Wyoming until Gale McGee began his tenure, although McGee was the last remaining Democrat to serve in that role.

== Democratic primary ==
=== Candidates ===
- John J. Hickey, incumbent U.S. Senator

=== Results ===
Democratic primary
Party	Candidate	Votes	%
Democratic	John J. Hickey (inc.)	32,507	100.00%
Total votes		32,507	100.00%

== Republican primary ==
=== Candidates ===
- Milward Simpson, former Governor of Wyoming
- Kenny Sailors, basketball player, former State Representative

=== Results ===
Republican primary
Party	Candidate	Votes	%
Republican	Milward Simpson	30,124	59.64%
Republican	Kenny Sailors	20,383	40.36%
Total votes		50,507	100.00%

== General election ==
=== Results ===
1962 United States Senate election in Wyoming
Party	Candidate	Votes	%	±%
Republican	Milward Simpson	69,043	57.84%	+1.47%
Democratic	John J. Hickey (inc.)	50,329	42.16%	−1.47%
Majority		18,714	15.68%	+2.93%
Turnout		119,372		
Republican gain from Democratic				
