= William M. Jack =

American politician

11th Secretary of State of Wyoming
- In office October 16, 1944 – January 6, 1947
- Governor: Lester C. Hunt
- Preceded by: Mart T. Christensen
- Succeeded by: Arthur G. Crane

16th Wyoming State Auditor
- In office January 7, 1935 – October 16, 1944
- Governor: Leslie A. Miller; Nels H. Smith; Lester C. Hunt
- Preceded by: Roscoe Alcorn
- Succeeded by: Carl Robinson

21st Speaker of the Wyoming House of Representatives
- In office 1933–1934
- Preceded by: Charles B. Mann
- Succeeded by: Henry D. Watenpaugh

Member of the Wyoming House of Representatives
- In office 1925–1934

Personal details
- Born: William Maxwell Jack II; March 5, 1892 New York City, U.S.
- Died: April 14, 1970 (aged 78) Casper, Wyoming, U.S.
- Party: Democratic
- Spouse: Huldah Teresa
- Children: 5
- Parent: William Maxwell Jack (father)

William Maxwell Jack (March 5, 1892 – April 14, 1970) was an American politician who served as auditor and secretary of state of Wyoming as a Democrat.

== Early life ==
William Maxwell Jack was born in New York City on March 5, 1892, to Scottish immigrants. In 1894 his family moved back to Scotland and he was raised in Edinburgh where he had to drop out of school at age 12 to help run his family's store. In October 1910 he returned to the United States, his family would remain in Britain with his brother losing his arm during The Blitz, and became a rancher in Lusk, Wyoming, and later married Huldah Teresa on June 1, 1920. During World War I he was drafted, but was discharged after training and after returning to Wyoming became active in the oil industry.

== Career ==
=== Early politics ===
In 1922 he unsuccessfully ran for justice of the peace in Lusk. In 1924 he successful ran for one of Niobrara County's two seats in the state house and was reelected in 1926. In 1928 he moved to Casper after being transferred by an oil company and was elected to the state house again in 1930 and reelected in 1932. In 1933 he was elected as Speaker of the House becoming the first Democratic Speaker in Wyoming's history.

=== State Auditor ===
On March 30, 1934, he announced that he would run for the Democratic nomination for state auditor and defeated incumbent Auditor Roscoe Alcorn in the general election in the Democratic landslide of the year when they took control of all five statewide offices and the state legislature. In early 1935, Governor Leslie A. Miller had to temporarily leave Wyoming resulting in Secretary of State Lester C. Hunt becoming acting governor and further responsibility out of state lead to Senate President Nels H. Smith becoming acting governor and on March 5, 1935, Jack became acting governor for a few hours. When the gas chamber in the Wyoming State Penitentiary was under construction Jack stated that he was against it and supported efforts to prevent its completion along with members of the state legislature, but it was eventually completed.

On April 2, 1938, he announced that he would seek reelection and after facing no opposition in the primary defeated C. J. Rogers in the general election. In the 1938 elections the Democrats lost three statewide elections and control of the state legislature, but Jack was the best performing statewide candidate. In 1940 he served as the chairman of the Natrona county delegation to the Wyoming Democratic party's state convention and was later named as temporary chairman.

On May 12, 1942, he announced that he would seek reelection to a third term and easily won the primary against Carl A. Johnson and later won in the general election against Everett T. Copenhaver.

In 1944 Secretary of State Mart T. Christensen died and after Governor Lester C. Hunt rejected Deputy Secretary of State Everett T. Copenhaver for the position he chose to appoint Jack. On October 16, 1944, he resigned as auditor to take up the position of secretary of state. On January 10, 1946, he announced that he would not seek a term in his own right or seek any other political office.

== Later life ==
After leaving office he returned to the oil industry and became a public relations officer for the Rocky Mountain and Gas Association throughout the 1950s and was appointed as executive vice president in 1950 which he served as until April 1, 1954. On March 3, 1954, he announced that he would seek the Democratic nomination for governor and won the primary, but was defeated in the general election by Milward Simpson. He was later appointed by Simpson to the State Board of Equalization for a six-year term. In March 1962 Jack announced that he would mount a primary challenge against Governor Jack R. Gage, but Gage narrowly defeated him by 4,176 votes and went on to be defeated in the general election by Teton county commissioner Clifford Hansen. In 1964 Senator Gale W. McGee appointed him as regional director of the Small Business Administration in Casper and served until November 1969.

On April 14, 1970, he died at his home in Casper, Wyoming at age 78.

== Electoral history ==
William M. Jack electoral history

1924 Wyoming Niobrara County House election
Party	Candidate	Votes	%
Democratic	Thomas M. Fagan	943	29.49%
Democratic	William M. Jack	909	28.42%
Republican	J. H. Roy	682	21.33%
Republican	Tom Black	664	20.76%
Total votes		3,198	100.00%

1938 Wyoming State Auditor election
Party	Candidate	Votes	%
Democratic	William M. Jack (incumbent)	45,245	54.29%
Republican	C. J. Rogers	38,097	45.71%
Total votes		83,342	100.00%

1942 Wyoming State Auditor Democratic primary
Party	Candidate	Votes	%
Democratic	William M. Jack (incumbent)	16,369	78.03%
Republican	Carl A. Johnson	4,608	21.97%
Total votes		20,977	100.00%

1942 Wyoming State Auditor election
Party	Candidate	Votes	%	±%
Democratic	William M. Jack (incumbent)	32,438	54.98%	+0.69%
Republican	Everett T. Copenhaver	26,557	45.02%	−0.69%
Total votes		58,995	100.00%	

1954 Wyoming Gubernatorial Democratic primary
Party	Candidate	Votes	%
Democratic	William M. Jack	26,283	80.05%
Democratic	D. A. Dexter	6,550	19.95%
Total votes		32,833	100.00%

1954 Wyoming Gubernatorial election
Party	Candidate	Votes	%	±%
Republican	Milward Simpson	56,275	50.50%	−5.65%
Democratic	William M. Jack	55,163	49.50%	+5.65%
Total votes		111,438	100.00%	

1962 Wyoming Gubernatorial Democratic primary
Party	Candidate	Votes	%
Democratic	Jack R. Gage (incumbent)	21,051	55.51%
Democratic	William M. Jack	16,875	44.50%
Total votes		37,926	100.00%

Party political offices
Preceded by John J. McIntyre	Democratic nominee for Governor of Wyoming; 1954	Succeeded by John J. Hickey
