= John Coleman Pickett =

American judge (1896–1983)

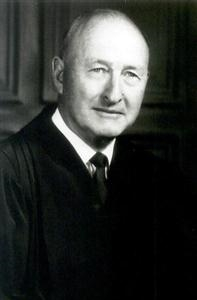

Senior Judge of the United States Court of Appeals for the Tenth Circuit
- In office January 1, 1966 – September 1, 1983

Judge of the United States Court of Appeals for the Tenth Circuit
- In office October 13, 1949 – January 1, 1966
- Appointed by: Harry S. Truman
- Preceded by: Seat established by 63 Stat. 493
- Succeeded by: Joe Hickey

United States Attorney for the District of Wyoming
- In office 1949–1949
- President: Harry Truman
- Preceded by: Carl L. Sackett
- Succeeded by: John J. Hickey

Personal details
- Born: John Coleman Pickett; September 3, 1896 Ravenna, Nebraska, U.S.
- Died: September 1, 1983 (aged 86)
- Education: University of Nebraska College of Law (LLB)

Military service
- Allegiance: United States
- Branch/service: United States Army
- Rank: Second Lieutenant
- Battles/wars: World War I

John Coleman Pickett (September 3, 1896 – September 1, 1983) was an American soldier, United States Attorney, and a United States circuit judge of the United States Court of Appeals for the Tenth Circuit.

== Education and career ==
Born in Ravenna, Nebraska, Pickett was a Second Lieutenant in the United States Army during World War I, and received a Bachelor of Laws from the University of Nebraska College of Law in 1922. He entered private practice in Cheyenne, Wyoming from 1922 to 1949, and then served as an assistant state attorney general of Wyoming from 1923 to 1925, and as a county and prosecuting attorney of Laramie County, Wyoming from 1928 to 1934. He was an Assistant United States Attorney for the District of Wyoming from 1935 to 1949, becoming the United States Attorney for the District of Wyoming in 1949.

== Federal judicial service ==
Pickett was nominated by President Harry S. Truman on September 23, 1949, to the United States Court of Appeals for the Tenth Circuit, to a new seat authorized by 63 Stat. 493. He was confirmed by the United States Senate on October 12, 1949, and received his commission on October 13, 1949. He assumed senior status on January 1, 1966. His service terminated on September 1, 1983, due to his death.

== Sources ==
Legal offices
Preceded by Seat established by 63 Stat. 493	Judge of the United States Court of Appeals for the Tenth Circuit; 1949–1966	Succeeded by Joe Hickey
