= 1958 Wyoming gubernatorial election =

- November 4, 1958
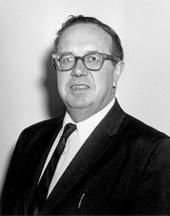

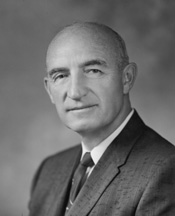
Nominee	John J. Hickey	Milward Simpson
Party	Democratic	Republican
Popular vote	55,070	52,488
Percentage	48.94%	46.64%
- County results Hickey: 40–50% 50–60% 60–70% 70–80% Simpson: 40–50% 50–60% 60–70%
Governor before election
Milward Simpson
Republican
Elected Governor
John J. Hickey
Democratic

The 1958 Wyoming gubernatorial election took place on November 4, 1958. Incumbent Republican Governor Milward Simpson ran for re-election to a second term. He was challenged by John J. Hickey, the former U.S. Attorney for the District of Wyoming and the Democratic nominee. Following a close campaign, Hickey narrowly defeated Simpson for re-election, winning just a narrow plurality because of a third-party candidate in the race. Four years after this, in the 1962 special U.S. Senate election, Simpson defeated Hickey in a rematch. To date, this is the last Wyoming gubernatorial election where an incumbent Republican was defeated.

== Campaign ==
Louis W. Carlson ran a campaign around legalizing gambling. Simpson attributed his defeat to his failure to win the traditionally Republican Sheridan County. Voters in Sheridan County were displeased with Interstate 90 going from Gillette to Buffalo rather than between Gillette and Sheridan.

== Democratic primary ==
=== Candidates ===
- John J. Hickey, former U.S. Attorney for the District of Wyoming

=== Results ===
Democratic primary
Party	Candidate	Votes	%
Democratic	John J. Hickey	33,027	100.00%
Total votes		33,027	100.00%

== Republican primary ==
=== Candidates ===
- Milward Simpson, incumbent Governor
- Stanley Edwards, former state civil defense director, former deputy state adjutant general

=== Results ===
Republican primary
Party	Candidate	Votes	%
Republican	Milward Simpson (inc.)	28,749	77.61%
Republican	Stanley Edwards	8,294	22.39%
Total votes		37,043	100.00%

== Results ==
1958 Wyoming gubernatorial election
Party	Candidate	Votes	%	±%
Democratic	John J. Hickey	55,070	48.94%	−0.57%
Republican	Milward Simpson (inc.)	52,488	46.64%	−3.86%
Economy	Louis W. Carlson	4,979	4.42%	−
Majority		2,582	2.29%	+1.30%
Turnout		112.537		
Democratic gain from Republican				

== Works cited ==
- Trachsel, Herman (1959). "The 1958 Election in Wyoming". The Western Political Quarterly. 12 (1). University of Utah: 363–66. doi:10.2307/444064. JSTOR 444064.
