= Win Hickey =

Wyoming politician

Member of the Wyoming Senate
- In office 1981–1990

Personal details
- Born: Winifred Espy; May 28, 1912 Rawlins, Wyoming
- Died: April 7, 2007 (aged 94) Cheyenne, Wyoming
- Party: Democratic

Winifred Espy "Win" Hickey (May 28, 1912 – April 7, 2007) was an American Democratic politician who was also the First Lady of Wyoming as wife of Governor J.J. Hickey.

Hickey became First Lady of Wyoming in 1958 when her husband was elected governor. After he died in 1970, she entered politics and became the first woman elected commissioner of Laramie County, Wyoming and the first woman elected to the Wyoming Senate from Laramie County, serving from 1981 to 1990.
