= 1954 Wyoming gubernatorial election =

- November 2, 1954
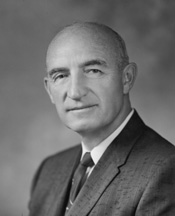

Nominee	Milward Simpson	William M. Jack
Party	Republican	Democratic
Popular vote	56,275	55,163
Percentage	50.50%	49.50%
- County results Simpson: 50–60% 60–70% 70–80% Jack: 50–60% 70–80%
Governor before election
Clifford Joy Rogers
Republican
Elected Governor
Milward Simpson
Republican

The 1954 Wyoming gubernatorial election took place on November 2, 1954. Incumbent Republican Governor Clifford Joy Rogers ran for a full term as Governor of Wyoming after Frank A. Barrett was elected to the U.S. Senate, but lost the nomination to former State Representative Milward Simpson. Simpson narrowly defeated Democratic former Secretary of State William Jack in the general election.

== Democratic primary ==
=== Candidates ===
- William M. Jack, former Secretary of State of Wyoming, State Auditor, and Speaker of the Wyoming House of Representatives
- D. A. Dexter, Casper businessman

Democratic primary results
Party	Candidate	Votes	%
Democratic	William M. Jack	26,283	80.05%
Democratic	D. Dexter	6,550	19.95%
Total votes		32,833	100.00%

== Republican primary ==
=== Candidates ===
- Milward Simpson, attorney and former State Representative
- Clifford Joy Rogers, incumbent Governor
- Frank C. Mockler, State Senator and former Speaker of the Wyoming House of Representatives
- Floyd W. Bartling, former President of the Wyoming Senate
- Marvin Bishop, former Speaker of the Wyoming House of Representatives
- Wardell Clinger, rancher

Republican primary results
Party	Candidate	Votes	%
Republican	Milward Simpson	17,089	37.79%
Republican	Clifford Joy Rogers (inc.)	12,797	28.30%
Republican	Frank C. Mockler	5,271	11.66%
Republican	Floyd W. Bartling	4,388	9.70%
Republican	Marvin Bishop	3,919	8.67%
Republican	Wardell Clinger	1,757	3.89%
Total votes		45,221	100.00%

== Results ==
1954 Wyoming gubernatorial election
Party	Candidate	Votes	%	±%
Republican	Milward Simpson	56,275	50.50%	−5.65%
Democratic	William M. Jack	55,163	49.50%	+5.65%
Majority		1,112	1.00%	−11.30%
Turnout		111,438		
Republican hold				
