= 1972 United States Senate election in Wyoming =

- November 7, 1972
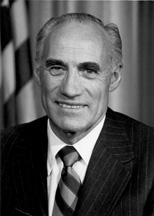

| Nominee | Clifford Hansen | Mike Vinich |
| Party | Republican | Democratic |
| Popular vote | 101,314 | 40,753 |
| Percentage | 71.31% | 28.69% |
- County results Hansen: 60–70% 70–80% 80–90%
U.S. senator before election
Clifford Hansen
Republican
Elected U.S. Senator
Clifford Hansen
Republican

The 1972 United States Senate election in Wyoming was held on November 7, 1972. Incumbent Republican Senator Clifford Hansen ran for re-election to a second term. He was challenged by Democratic nominee Mike Vinich, a former aide to Congressman Teno Roncalio and a bar owner in Hudson. As Hansen ran for re-election, President Richard Nixon was overwhelmingly defeating Democratic presidential nominee George McGovern in Wyoming. Hansen managed to outperform even Nixon, winning his second term in a landslide over Vinich.

== Democratic primary ==
=== Candidates ===
- William E. Fritchell, maintenance worker
- Doyle Henry, handyman
- Patrick E. Shanklin
- Mike Vinich, Hudson bar owner, former director of the Wyoming Employment Security Commission

=== Results ===
Democratic primary
| Party | Candidate | Votes | % |
|---|---|---|---|
| Democratic | Mike Vinich | 16,148 | 52.54% |
| Democratic | Doyle Henry | 5,642 | 18.36% |
| Democratic | Patrick E. Shanklin | 4,665 | 15.18% |
| Democratic | William E. Fritchell | 4,281 | 13.93% |
| Total votes | | 30,736 | 100.00% |

== Republican primary ==
=== Candidates ===
- Clifford Hansen, incumbent U.S. senator

=== Results ===
Republican primary
| Party | Candidate | Votes | % |
|---|---|---|---|
| Republican | Clifford Hansen (inc.) | 50,774 | 100.00% |
| Total votes | | 50,774 | 100.00% |

== General election ==
=== Results ===
1972 United States Senate election in Wyoming
| Party | Candidate | Votes | % | ±% |
|---|---|---|---|---|
| Republican | Clifford Hansen (inc.) | 101,314 | 71.31% | +19.52% |
| Democratic | Mike Vinich | 40,753 | 28.69% | −19.52% |
| Majority | | 60,561 | 42.63% | +39.04% |
| Turnout | | 142,067 | | |
| Republican hold | | | | |
