= 1934 Wyoming state elections =

A general election was held in the U.S. state of Wyoming on Tuesday, November 6, 1934. All of the state's executive officers—the Governor, Secretary of State, Auditor, Treasurer, and Superintendent of Public Instruction—were up for election. In the 1932 gubernatorial special election, the Democratic candidate, Leslie A. Miller, won and ran for re-election for a full term in 1934. The Democratic Party also won elections for Secretary of State, Auditor, Treasurer, and Superintendent of Public Instruction, flipping those offices from the Republican Party.

== Governor ==
Incumbent Democratic Governor Leslie A. Miller, first elected in the 1932 special election, ran for re-election to his second term and his first full term. He defeated Republican Secretary of State Alonzo M. Clark, who had acted as governor during the vacancy.

1934 Wyoming gubernatorial election
Party	Candidate	Votes	%	±%
Democratic	Leslie A. Miller (inc.)	54,305	57.91%	+7.06%
Republican	Alonzo M. Clark	38,792	41.36%	−5.85%
Socialist	Louis Sky	527	0.56%	−1.18%
Communist	Merton Willer	156	0.17%	−0.02%
Majority		15,513	16.54%	+12.91%
Turnout		93,780	100.00%	
Democratic hold				

== Secretary of State ==
Incumbent Secretary of State Alonzo M. Clark opted to run for Governor rather than seek re-election, creating an open seat. State Representative Lester C. Hunt won the Democratic primary over fellow State Representative Pat Flannery and faced State Senator Clifford A. Miller in the general election. Hunt defeated Miller by a wide margin, flipping control of the office to the Democratic Party for the first time since 1914.

=== Democratic primary ===
==== Candidates ====
- Lester C. Hunt, State Representative from Fremont County
- Pat Flannery, State Representative from Goshen County

==== Results ====
Democratic Party primary results
Party	Candidate	Votes	%
Democratic	Lester C. Hunt	16,996	62.31%
Democratic	Pat Flannery	10,281	37.69%
Total votes		27,277	100.00%

=== Republican primary ===
==== Candidates ====
- Clifford A. Miller, State Senator from Natrona County
- Clarence Gardner, State Senator from Lincoln County
- Fred E. Holdredge, former State Representative from Hot Springs County
- W. C. DeLoney, State Senator from Teton County

==== Results ====
Republican Primary results
Party	Candidate	Votes	%
Republican	Clifford A. Miller	10,519	32.85%
Republican	Clarence Gardner	9,647	30.12%
Republican	Fred S. Holdredge	9,175	28.65%
Republican	W. C. DeLoney	2,683	8.38%
Total votes		32,024	100.00%

=== General election ===
==== Results ====
1934 Wyoming Secretary of State election
Party	Candidate	Votes	%	±%
Democratic	Lester C. Hunt	49,902	55.74%	+16.18%
Republican	Clifford A. Miller	38,939	43.50%	−16.94%
Socialist	A. Carlson	525	0.59%	−
Communist	Fred Strong	154	0.17%	−
Majority		10,963	12.25%	−8.63%
Turnout		89,520		
Democratic gain from Republican				

== Auditor ==
Incumbent Republican Auditor Roscoe Alcorn ran for re-election to a third term, and a second full term following his appointment in 1929. He once again faced accountant C. H. Reimerth in the Republican primary, whom he easily defeated. In the general election, he faced William M. Jack, the Speaker of the Wyoming House of Representatives. Aided by the Democratic landslide in Wyoming, Jack easily defeated Alcorn.

=== Democratic primary ===
==== Candidates ====
- William M. Jack, Speaker of the Wyoming House of Representatives

==== Results ====
Democratic Party primary results
Party	Candidate	Votes	%
Democratic	William M. Jack	25,407	100.00%
Total votes		25,407	100.00%

=== Republican primary ===
==== Candidates ====
- Roscoe Alcorn, incumbent State Auditor
- C. H. Reimerth, accountant, 1930 Republican candidate for Auditor

==== Results ====
Republican Primary results
Party	Candidate	Votes	%
Republican	Roscoe Alcorn (inc.)	21,814	68.77%
Republican	C. H. Reimerth	9,907	31.23%
Total votes		31,721	100.00

=== General election ===
==== Results ====
1934 Wyoming Auditor election
Party	Candidate	Votes	%	±%
Democratic	William M. Jack	52,086	57.69%	+19.52%
Republican	Roscoe Alcorn (inc.)	38,203	42.31%	−19.52%
Majority		13,883	15.38%	−8.30%
Turnout		90,289		
Democratic gain from Republican				

== Treasurer ==
Incumbent Republican State Treasurer Harry Weston was unable to seek re-election due to term limits, and Weston opted to retire rather than seek another office. Casper City Treasurer Charles A. Cullen won the Republican primary and faced Democratic nominee J. Kirk Baldwin, the former state airport supervisor, and Communist Party nominee Don Wirth in the general election. Baldwin defeated Cullen in a landslide.

=== Democratic primary ===
==== Candidates ====
- J. Kirk Baldwin, former state airport supervisor
- A. E. Wilde, State Examiner, former State Representative from Lincoln County

==== Results ====
Democratic Party primary results
Party	Candidate	Votes	%
Democratic	J. Kirk Baldwin	13,868	51.01%
Democratic	A. E. Wilde	13,320	48.99%
Total votes		27,188	100.00%

=== Republican primary ===
==== Candidates ====
- Charles A. Cullen, Casper City Treasurer
- F. G. Huffman, former State Representative from Platte County
- Hans Hansen, former State Representative from Big Horn County

==== Results ====
Republican Primary results
Party	Candidate	Votes	%
Republican	Charles A. Cullen	11,324	36.22%
Republican	F. G. Huffman	10,131	32.40%
Republican	Hans Hansen	9,810	31.38%
Total votes		31,265	100.00%

=== General election ===
==== Results ====
1934 Wyoming Treasurer election
Party	Candidate	Votes	%	±%
Democratic	J. Kirk Baldwin	52,071	59.03%	+18.22%
Republican	Charles A. Cullen	35,948	40.75%	−18.44%
Communist	Don Wirth	195	0.22%	−
Majority		16,123	18.28%	−0.11%
Turnout		88,214		
Democratic gain from Republican				

== Superintendent of Public Instruction ==
Incumbent Republican Superintendent of Public Instruction Katharine A. Morton ran for re-election to a fifth term. She faced several challengers in the Republican primary and won renomination with a plurality. In the general election, she faced Jack R. Gage, who won the Democratic primary with less than 20% of the vote. Gage was able to take advantage of the Democratic landslide in Wyoming and defeated Morton with more than 60% of the vote, a significant reversal from Morton's past electoral successes.

=== Democratic primary ===
==== Candidates ====
- Jack R. Gage, Sheridan teacher
- Maude Sholty, State Director of Special Education
- Gilbert E. Johnson
- Ida M. B. Anderson,
- Elmer J. Halseth, Rock Springs teacher
- M. A. Thrasher, Platte County Commissioner, member of the University of Wyoming Board of Trustees

==== Results ====
Democratic Party primary results
Party	Candidate	Votes	%
Democratic	Jack R. Gage	5,549	19.84%
Democratic	Maude Sholty	5,291	18.92%
Democratic	Gilbert E. Johnson	4,742	16.96%
Democratic	Ida M. B. Anderson	4,655	16.65%
Democratic	Elmer J. Halseth	3,986	14.25%
Democratic	M. A. Thrasher	3,742	13.38%
Total votes		27,965	100.00%

=== Republican primary ===
==== Candidates ====
- Katharine A. Morton, incumbent Superintendent of Instruction
- H. T. Emmett, Wahaskie County Superintendent of Schools
- Clare E. Ausherman, former Wyoming State Librarian

==== Results ====
Republican Party primary results
Party	Candidate	Votes	%
Republican	Katharine Morton (inc.)	16,569	49.34
Republican	H. T. Emmett	9,100	27.10
Republican	Clare E. Ausherman	7,910	23.56
Total votes		33,579	100.00%

=== General election ===
==== Results ====
1934 Wyoming Superintendent of Public Instruction election
Party	Candidate	Votes	%	±%
Democratic	Jack R. Gage	55,194	60.94%	+11.91%
Republican	Katharine A. Morton (inc.)	35,379	39.06%	−11.91%
Majority		19,815	21.88%	+19.94%
Turnout		90,573	100.00%	
Democratic gain from Republican				
