= Joe Hickey (politician) =

American judge and 24th Governor of Wyoming

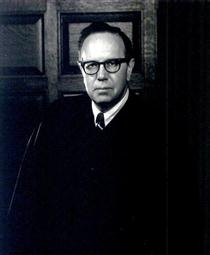

Judge of the United States Court of Appeals for the Tenth Circuit
- In office June 9, 1966 – September 22, 1970
- Appointed by: Lyndon B. Johnson
- Preceded by: John Coleman Pickett
- Succeeded by: James E. Barrett

United States Senator from Wyoming
- In office January 3, 1961 – November 6, 1962
- Appointed by: Jack R. Gage
- Preceded by: Keith Thomson (elect); Joseph C. O'Mahoney
- Succeeded by: Milward Simpson

24th Governor of Wyoming
- In office January 5, 1959 – January 2, 1961
- Preceded by: Milward Simpson
- Succeeded by: Jack R. Gage

United States Attorney for the District of Wyoming
- In office 1949–1953
- President: Harry Truman
- Preceded by: John Coleman Pickett
- Succeeded by: John F. Raper

Personal details
- Born: John Joseph Hickey; August 22, 1911 Rawlins, Wyoming, U.S.
- Died: September 22, 1970 (aged 59) Cheyenne, Wyoming, U.S.
- Resting place: Rawlins Cemetery, Rawlins, Wyoming, U.S.
- Party: Democratic
- Spouse: Winifred E. Espy
- Children: 2
- Parents: John Joseph Hickey (father); Brigit O'Meara (mother)
- Education: University of Wyoming College of Law (LLB)

Military service
- Allegiance: United States
- Branch/service: United States Army
- Years of service: 1942–1945
- Rank: Captain
- Battles/wars: World War II

John Joseph Hickey (August 22, 1911 – September 22, 1970), known as Joe or J. J. Hickey, was an American judge and politician who served the 24th governor of Wyoming from 1959 to 1961 and as a United States senator from 1961 to 1962. A member of the Democratic party, he later served as a judge on the Court of Appeals for the Tenth Circuit from 1966 to 1970. He was the first governor of Wyoming to be born in the 20th century.

== Early life ==
Joe Hickey was born in Rawlins, Wyoming, on August 22, 1911, to John Joseph Hickey and Brigit O'Meara. John moved to Wyoming in 1873, and was employed by the Union Pacific Railroad. Joe graduated from public school in Rawlins in 1929, and graduated with a law degree from the University of Wyoming College of Law in 1934.

Hickey served in the army during World War II for 42 months and received the rank of private.

In 1942 he joined the army as a private and after serving for forty two months rose to the rank of captain. On December 25, 1945, he was honorably discharged and on January 15, 1946, he married Winifred Espy. He served as county attorney of Carbon County from 1946 to 1949.

== Career ==
=== Early politics ===
Hickey served as the treasurer of Rawlins from 1935 to 1940, and was the chair of the Carbon County Democratic Party. He was county attorney of Carbon County from 1939 to 1942. President Harry S. Truman appointed him as the U.S. District Attorney for Wyoming in 1949. Hickey was a U.S. Attorney for the District of Wyoming from 1949 to 1954.

Hickey became chair of the Wyoming Democratic Party in 1954.

=== Governor and Senator ===
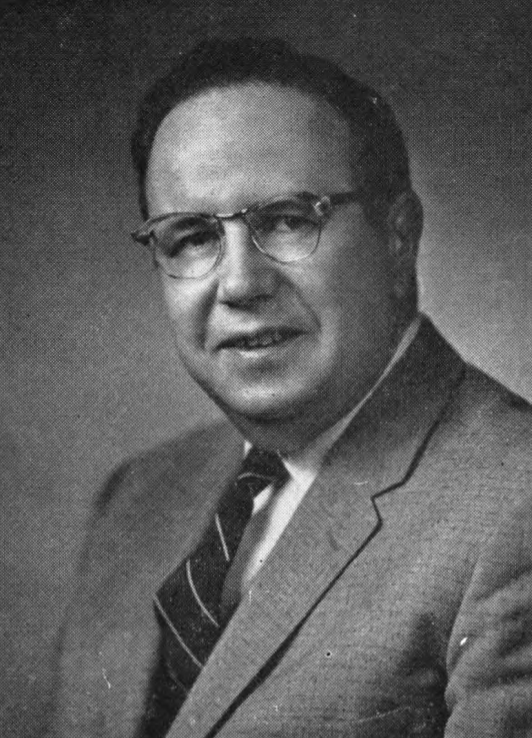
Hickey as governor.

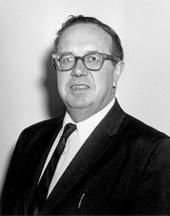
Hickey as a senator.

He was the Governor of Wyoming from 1959 to 1961.

Hickey seconded the presidential nomination of Lyndon B. Johnson at the 1960 Democratic National Convention. During the 1960 presidential election Hickey stated that the issue over Kennedy's Catholicism would not be important in Wyoming due to Hickey, who was also a Catholic, having won in 1958.

Hickey resigned as governor and Secretary of State Jack R. Gage ascended to the position. On January 2, 1961, Gage appointed him to fill the vacancy created by U.S. Senator-elect Keith Thomson's death. Hickey lost the election to his predecessor in the governor's mansion, Republican Milward Simpson, in 1962. On October 15, 1962, he suffered a heart attack, but recovered.

=== Tenth Circuit ===
He was in private practice of law in Rawlins from 1962 to 1966. Hickey was nominated by President Lyndon B. Johnson on May 12, 1966, to a seat on the United States Court of Appeals for the Tenth Circuit vacated by Judge John Coleman Pickett. He was confirmed by the United States Senate on June 9, 1966, and received his commission the same day.

== Death ==
In July 1970, Hickey was hospitalized for a stomach ulcer and in August he went to the Presbyterian Medical Center in Denver for lung cancer treatment. On September 22, 1970, he died in a Cheyenne hospital. He was buried on September 24, and eulogized by Bishop Hubert Newell.

== Electoral history ==
1958 Wyoming Gubernatorial election
Party	Candidate	Votes	%	±%
Democratic	Joe Hickey	55,070	48.94%	−0.56%
Republican	Milward Simpson (incumbent)	52,488	46.64%	−3.86%
Economy	Louis W. Carlson	4,979	4.42%	+4.42%
Total votes		112,537	100.00%	

1962 Wyoming Senate special election
Party	Candidate	Votes	%	±%
Republican	Milward Simpson	69,043	57.84%	+1.47%
Democratic	Joe Hickey (incumbent)	50,329	42.16%	−1.47%
Total votes		119,372	100.00%	

Party political offices
Preceded by William M. Jack	Democratic nominee for Governor of Wyoming; 1958	Succeeded by Jack R. Gage
Preceded by Raymond B. Whitaker	Democratic nominee for U.S. Senator from Wyoming (Class 2); 1962	Succeeded by Teno Roncalio
Political offices
Preceded by Milward Simpson	Governor of Wyoming; January 5, 1959 – January 2, 1961	Succeeded by Jack R. Gage
U.S. Senate
Preceded by Keith Thomson elect Joseph C. O'Mahoney	U.S. senator (Class 2) from Wyoming; January 3, 1961 – November 6, 1962; Served alongside: Gale W. McGee	Succeeded by Milward Simpson
Legal offices
Preceded by John Coleman Pickett	Judge of the United States Court of Appeals for the Tenth Circuit; June 9, 1966 – September 22, 1970	Succeeded by James E. Barrett
