= Clifford Hansen =

American politician (1912–2009)

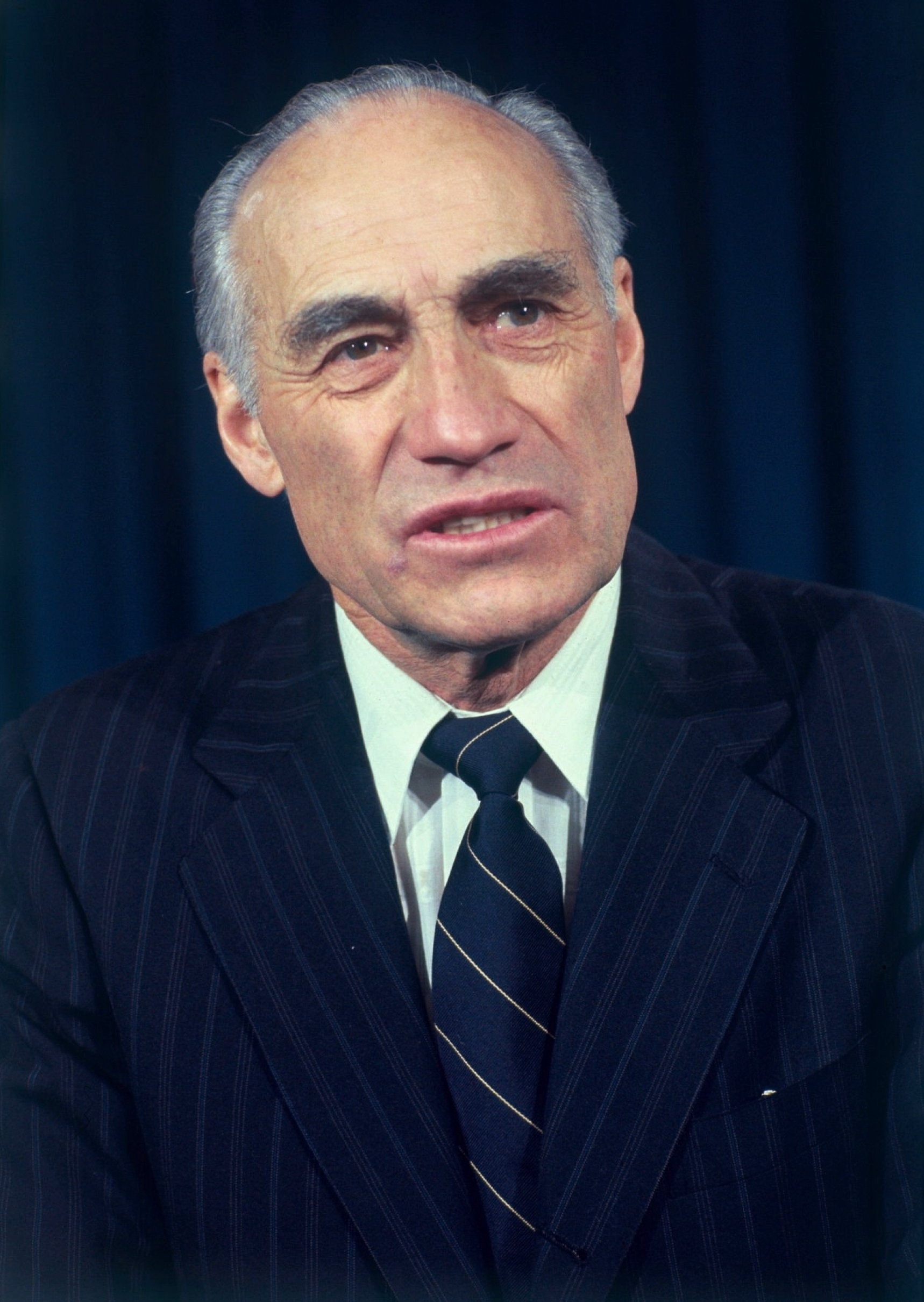
- Hansen in 1977

United States Senator from Wyoming
- In office January 3, 1967 – December 31, 1978
- Preceded by: Milward Simpson
- Succeeded by: Alan Simpson

26th Governor of Wyoming
- In office January 7, 1963 – January 2, 1967
- Preceded by: Jack R. Gage
- Succeeded by: Stanley K. Hathaway

Personal details
- Born: Clifford Peter Hansen; October 16, 1912 Teton County, Wyoming, U.S.
- Died: October 20, 2009 (aged 97) Jackson, Wyoming, U.S.
- Party: Republican
- Spouse: Martha Close (m. 1934)
- Children: 2, including Mary
- Education: University of Wyoming (BS)

Clifford Peter Hansen (October 16, 1912 – October 20, 2009) was an American politician from the state of Wyoming. A Republican, he served as the 26th governor of Wyoming from 1963 to 1967 and subsequently as a United States senator from 1967 to 1978. He served as a member of the board of trustees from 1946–1966 to his alma mater, the University of Wyoming located in Laramie. He was also a county commissioner in Jackson, the seat of Teton County in northwestern Wyoming. Before his death on October 20, 2009, he was the oldest living former U.S. senator as well as the third oldest living former U.S. governor.

== Early years and education ==
Hansen was born in Zenith (now Teton County but then Lincoln County), a settlement so small that it is no longer listed on Wyoming road maps. He was the son of Sylvia Irene (née Wood) and Peter Christofferson Hansen. The senior Hansens were ranchers originally from Idaho: Peter, of Danish extraction, came from Soda Springs, and Sylvia, of English descent, was born in Blackfoot. Peter Hansen, who had some college training, was a "practical" engineer who did surveying and ditch work on ranch lands.

Clifford Hansen grew up in Jackson Hole, a town in a high-mountain valley that includes Grand Teton National Park. There he attended public schools. As a child, he overcame a serious speech impediment which baffled his teachers, some of whom first thought that he was "uneducable". His problem was not an inability to learn but a severe stutter which was corrected by his attendance at a special school. Having overcome the speech impediment, Hansen forever stressed the value of an education, once having advised a grandson, "It's the one thing no one can take away from you."

Hansen obtained his bachelor's degree in animal science from UW in 1934. While at the university he was in the Epsilon Delta chapter of Sigma Nu fraternity. He was a UW trustee from 1946 to 1966 and the trustee board president from 1955 until 1962, when he resigned to run for governor. From 1943 to 1951, he was a Teton county commissioner. From 1953 to 1955 he served as the president of the Wyoming Stock Growers Association.

== Governor of Wyoming ==
Hansen won the governorship in the 1962 mid-term elections by 10,000 votes. He unseated the Democrat Jack R. Gage, who had served fewer than two years. First, Hansen won the GOP primary over two opponents with 57 percent of the ballots. Gage defeated William Jack to secure the Democratic nomination, 55.5-44.5 percent. In the general election, Hansen polled 64,970 votes (54.5 percent) to Gage's 54,298 (45.5 percent).

Several newspapers in the American West referred to him as Wyoming's "cowboy governor". Hansen's obituary contends that he "brought both the down-to-earth pragmatism of a lifelong cattle rancher and the affability of a small-town politician to Cheyenne and then to Washington, and he was on friendly and familiar terms throughout his career, not only with those on both sides of the political aisle, but also with elevator attendants, cafeteria workers, and staff members throughout the Capitol who called him friend."

As Governor, he increased appropriations for state programs to combat alcoholism and mental illness by more than 50 percent.

As his gubernatorial term wound down, Hansen decided to run for the U.S. Senate seat which was being vacated by the retiring Republican Milward L. Simpson. He won that election with just under 52 percent of the vote.

In a fairly Republican year nationally, he defeated popular Representative at-large Teno Roncalio, a Democrat of Italian extraction. Hansen received 63,548 votes (51.8 percent) to Roncalio's 59,141 (48.2 percent).

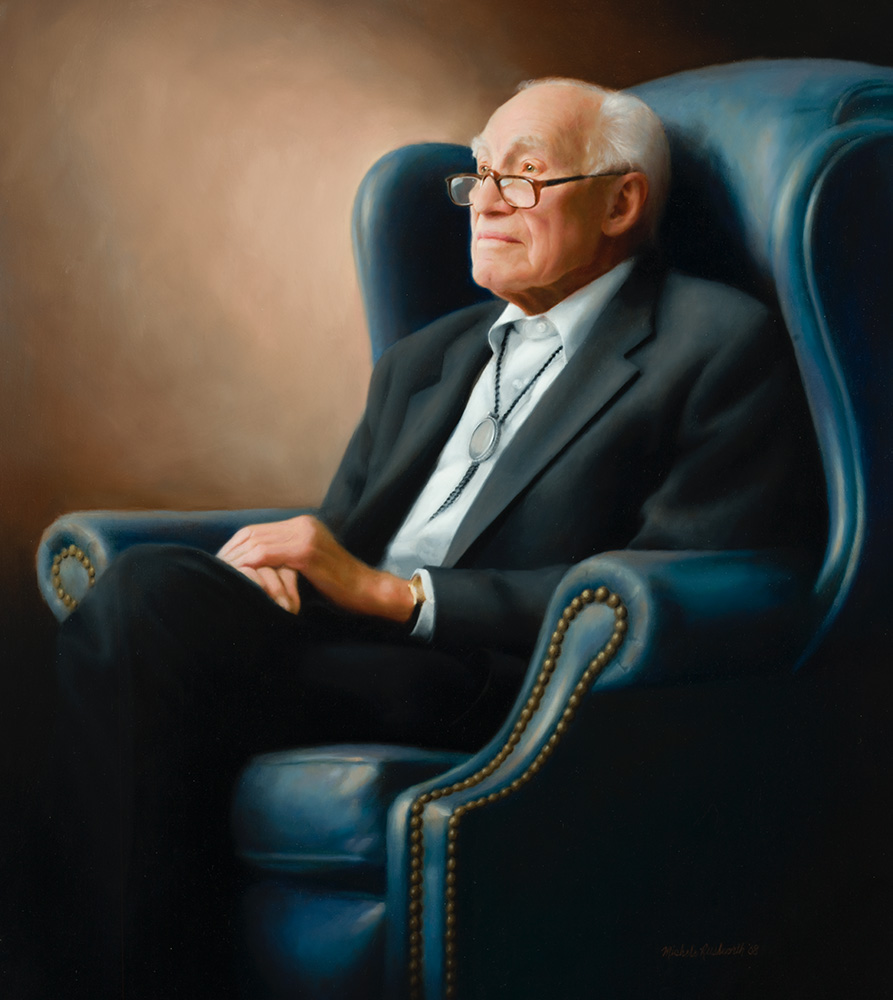
Clifford Hansen portrait painting, oil on canvas, by artist Michele Rushworth, State Capitol, Cheyenne, Wyoming

== U.S. Senate years (1967–1978) ==
In 1972, Hansen was reelected to the Senate over Democrat Mike Vinich: 101,314 votes (71.3%) to 40,753 (28.7%).

Senator Hansen was known for social and fiscal conservatism. He voted against sending the proposed Equal Rights Amendment to the states for their consideration. He opposed the Nixon administration's deployment of the anti-ballistic missile, a position which put him at odds with then Defense Secretary Melvin R. Laird.

Hansen voted in favor of the Civil Rights Act of 1968 and the confirmation of Thurgood Marshall to the U.S. Supreme Court.

In 1976, Hansen supported the nomination and run for election of President Gerald Ford, who won Wyoming's three electoral votes. Hansen retired from the Senate in 1978, when he declined to run for a third term. He moved back to Jackson and served on the Senate Finance Committee under chairman Russell B. Long.

Another of Hansen's accomplishments was national legislation that increased the share of mineral royalties collected on federal lands within the western states from 37.5 to 50 percent. This adjustment brought an additional $2.8 billion to Wyoming over the years, according to calculations requested by Governor Dave Freudenthal from the state Department of Revenue.

Hansen resigned his Senate seat on December 31, 1978. Alan Simpson would later become the Senate Republican whip. At the Hansen funeral, Simpson paid tribute, accordingly: "I owe him much. All of Wyoming and the nation owe him much. . . . He was a dear and special man who gave much and asked [for] very little, and fought on always with integrity, courage, and an uncommon degree of common sense. God bless his soul."

== Family ==
In 1934, Hansen married the former Martha Close (June 5, 1914 – September 29, 2011), who was raised in Sheridan, Wyoming. The two had met at the University of Wyoming.

The Hansens were the parents of Peter Arthur Hansen and Mary Mead.

Hansen's grandson, Matthew H. "Matt" Mead (born March 1, 1962), served as the United States Attorney in Cheyenne from 2001 to 2007, as an appointee of U.S. President George W. Bush. In 2007, he resigned as the U.S. Attorney to seek the seat of the late U.S. Senator Craig Thomas. However, the Wyoming Republican State Central Committee bypassed Mead on the third and final ballot. He came within fourteen votes of being one of the three nominees from which Governor Freudenthal (D) would make the final selection to fill the Thomas vacancy until the 2008 general election. In 2010, Mead was elected governor of Wyoming, re-elected in 2014, and served as the 32nd Governor of Wyoming (2011–2019).

Upon the death of former Republican Senator Hiram L. Fong of Hawaii in August 2004, Hansen became the oldest living person to have served in the United States Senate.

Hansen's official gubernatorial portrait was prepared by Michele Rushworth, who sought to represent the former governor's soul in paint.

== Death and legacy ==
In 2006, Hansen said in an interview that he and his wife were in "pretty good health" considering their ages, though he had vision difficulties; so they had retained a driver. By mid-October 2009, Hansen fell severely ill because of complications from a broken pelvis. After a short time in the hospital, he returned home to be with Martha, his wife of more than seventy-five years, whom he had met at UW in Laramie. Theirs was the longest active marriage of a present or former U.S. senator. Hansen's prognosis was poor, and he died on October 20, four days after his 97th birthday. In addition to his wife and son, Hansen was also survived by a brother, Robert Hansen, and a sister, Ordeen Hansen, five grandchildren, and ten great-grandchildren.

Hansen lay in state in a casket draped with the Wyoming flag at the state capitol in Cheyenne. State funeral services were held on October 24 at the Cheyenne Civic Center. Governor Freudenthal eulogized Hansen:

I think that without a doubt we can see Cliff Hansen was beloved and always will be. ... And more than any stone monument, we will carry him with us throughout our lives because he is woven into who we are and through the fabric of this wonderful state.

Mrs. Hansen recalled her husband's faith in the American people: "Everybody is important, and his actions both inside and outside politics bore that out."

In 1995, Hansen was inducted, along with the Texas artist and illustrator Thomas C. Lea, III, into the National Cowboy and Western Heritage Museum in Oklahoma City, Oklahoma, as a "Great Westerner."

Pete Williams recalled his former boss as follows: "He was an honest man, of rock solid integrity, who loved his wife, his children, and his state. And when his service to his nation was over, he went back to Wyoming, where he died, not far from the log house where he was born."

In 1995, he was inducted into the Hall of Great Westerners of the National Cowboy & Western Heritage Museum.

Party political offices
Preceded by Milward Simpson	Republican nominee for Governor of Wyoming; 1962	Succeeded by Stanley K. Hathaway
Preceded by Milward Simpson	Republican nominee for U.S. Senator from Wyoming (Class 2); 1966, 1972	Succeeded by Alan Simpson
Political offices
Preceded by Jack R. Gage	Governor of Wyoming; 1963–1967	Succeeded by Stanley K. Hathaway
U.S. Senate
Preceded by Milward Simpson	U.S. Senator (Class 2) from Wyoming; 1967–1978; Served alongside: Gale W. McGee, Malcolm Wallop	Succeeded by Alan Simpson
Honorary titles
Preceded by Hiram Fong	Oldest living United States senator (Sitting or former); 2004–2009	Succeeded by Harry F. Byrd Jr.
