= Jack R. Gage =

25th Governor of Wyoming

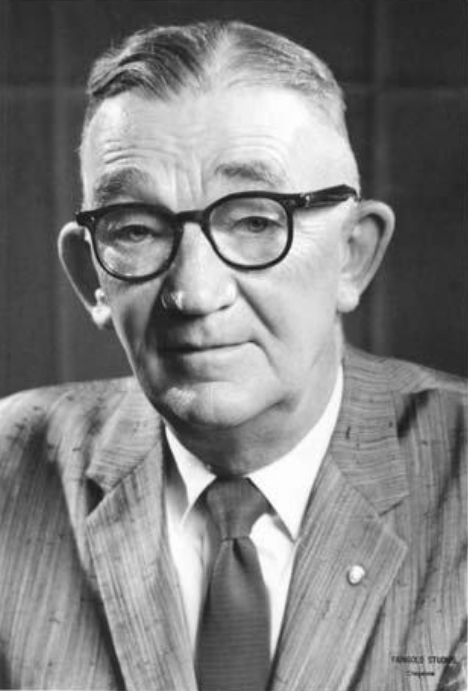

25th Governor of Wyoming
- In office January 3, 1961 – January 7, 1963
- Preceded by: John Hickey
- Succeeded by: Clifford Hansen

15th Secretary of State of Wyoming
- In office January 5, 1959 – January 7, 1963
- Governor: John Hickey; Himself
- Preceded by: Everett Copenhaver
- Succeeded by: Thyra Thomson

9th Wyoming Superintendent of Public Instruction
- In office January 8, 1935 – 1939
- Preceded by: Katherine Morton
- Succeeded by: Esther Anderson

Personal details
- Born: Jack Robert Gage; January 13, 1899 McCook, Nebraska, U.S.
- Died: March 14, 1970 (aged 71) Cheyenne, Wyoming, U.S.
- Party: Democratic
- Spouse: Leona Switzer
- Children: 2
- Education: University of Wyoming

Military service
- Allegiance: United States
- Branch/service: Field Artillery
- Years of service: 1918-1919
- Battles/wars: World War I

Jack Robert Gage (January 13, 1899 – March 14, 1970) was an American author, educator, and politician who served as the 25th governor of Wyoming as a member of the Democratic Party.

== Early life and education ==
Jack Robert Gage was born on January 13, 1899, in McCook, Nebraska to Will Vernon and LaVaughn Gage. In 1905, the family moved to Worland, Wyoming where Gage was raised. In 1918, he served in the army during World War I artillery until he was honorably discharged in 1919. In 1924, he received a Bachelor of Arts degree from the University of Wyoming in agriculture. On September 29, 1922, he married Leona Switzer and would later have two sons with her. From 1924 to 1925, he was a vocational agriculture teacher and from 1929 to 1934, he was a geology and biology teacher.

== Career ==
=== Superintendent of Public Instruction ===
On June 29, 1934, Gage filed to run for the Democratic nomination for Superintendent of Public Instruction and defeated five other candidates in the August primary. In the general election, he easily defeated Katharine A. Morton, the Republican nominee, in a landslide. In 1936, he went to Washington, D.C. to meet with Wyoming's congressional delegation seeking to have Wyoming's act of admission changed so that 33% of oil royalties could be distributed directly to school districts. In 1937, he and five other state officials had their voices recorded and Gage also wrote an essay that were placed into a time capsule which would be opened in 1987. On March 16, 1938, he announced that he would seek reelection, but was narrowly defeated in the general election by Republican Esther Anderson.

=== Business and education ===
In 1940, he became a manager for a KWYO radio station in Sheridan, invested into a school supply company, and wrote a Wyoming geography book for fifth to eighth grade students. On May 22, 1941, he was elected to the faculty of the Sheridan High School and on November 5, he assumed the role of Sheridan postmaster which he served as until 1958. In 1954, he was elected as president of the Wyoming chapter of the National Association of Postmasters and served until 1955. In 1956, he was elected as district governor for the Rotary International in Sheridan and was a member of a 37-person delegation that visited East and West Berlin and Moscow. In 1957, he was given a bronze medal at a banquet by the Crusade for Freedom association after writing the book "Plan for Peace" and spoke about his experience in the Soviet Union.

=== Governor ===
On June 6, 1958, Gage filed to run for the Democratic nomination for Secretary of State and in the general election he narrowly defeated Republican nominee Everett Copenhaver by 1,112 votes.

On December 1, 1960, Senator-elect Keith Thomson died causing a vacancy that Governor John J. Hickey chose to fill himself and on December 22, he resigned from office to accept the appointment. According to provisions of the state constitution Gage succeeded Hickey as governor. Before taking office he had to submit forty appointments for state boards and commissions and after taking office had to submit another thirty and with other transition issues to deal with made him unable to attend John F. Kennedy's presidential inauguration. During his tenure as governor he supported measures to increase the amount of money given to the states from federal oil royalties and opposed most tax increases. In March 1962, William M. Jack, the Democratic nominee for governor in 1954, announced that he would mount a primary challenge against Gage and Gage narrowly defeated him by 4,176 votes and went on to be defeated in the general election by Teton county commissioner Clifford Hansen.

The Gage Cabinet
Office	Name	Term
Governor	Jack R. Gage	1961-1963
Secretary of State	Jack R. Gage	1961-1963
State Auditor	Minnie A. Mitchell	1961-1963
State Treasurer	Clifford Joy Rogers	1961-1962
Richard J. Luman	1962-1963
Superintendent of Public Instruction	Velma Linford	1961-1963

== Later life and death ==
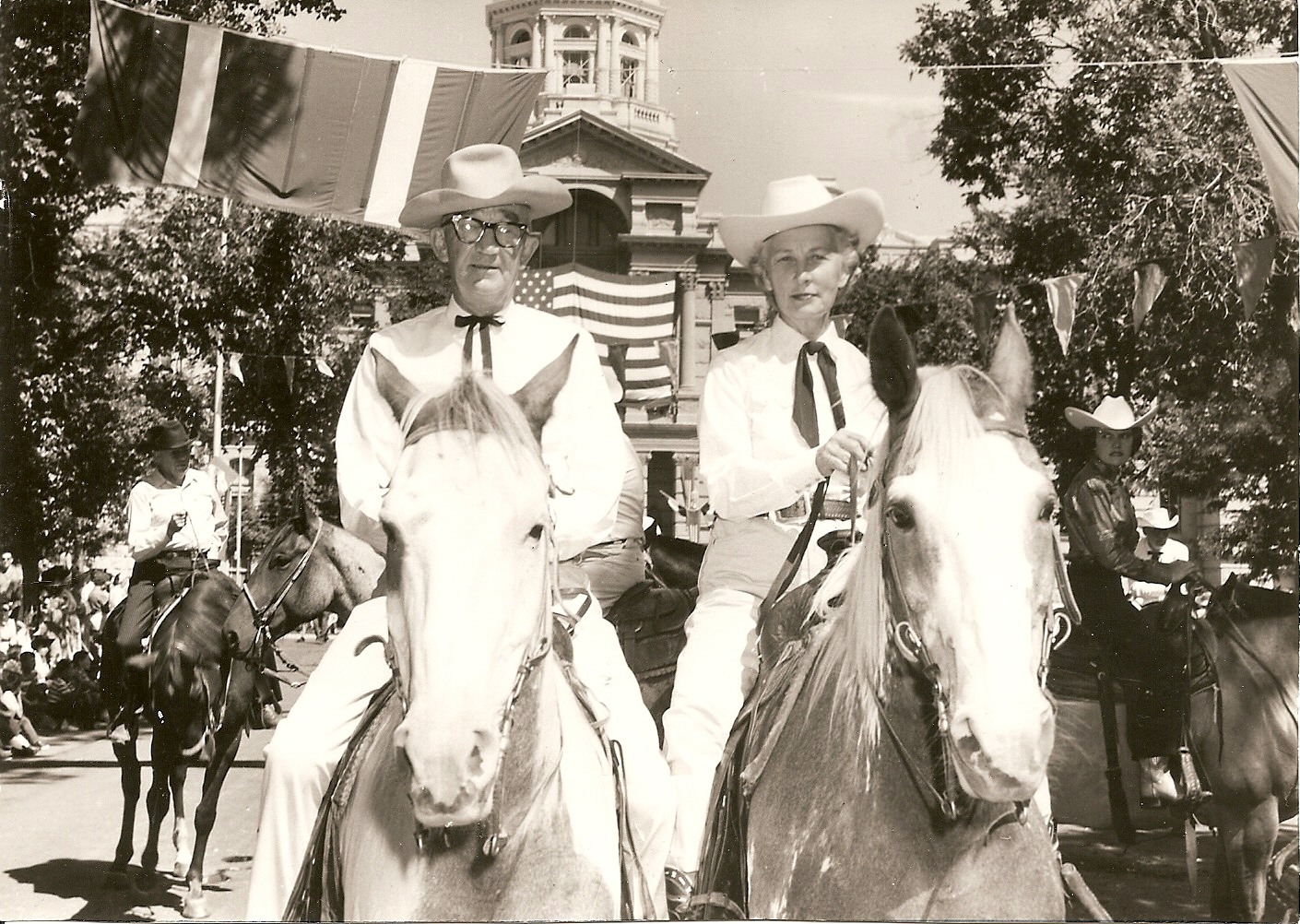
Governor Gage with wife "Buddy" riding in the Frontier Days Parade in Cheyenne, WY, July 1962

Following his defeat he vacationed in Australia for several months from 1963 to 1964 where he traveled over 9,000 miles and later wrote about it for a magazine. In 1966, he announced that he would run in the Democratic primary for governor, but was defeated in the primary and later that year published "Wyoming Afoot and Horseback".

In July 1968, he had his kidney removed and suffered an illness two weeks later. Gage died on March 14, 1970, at his home in Cheyenne after suffering from cancer for several months at age 71.

== Electoral history ==
Jack R. Gage electoral history

1934 Wyoming Superintendent of Public Instruction election
Primary election
Party	Candidate	Votes	%
Democratic	Jack R. Gage	5,474	20.08%
Democratic	Maude Sholty	5,061	18.57%
Democratic	Gilbert E. Johnson	4,695	17.22%
Democratic	Ida M. B. Anderson	4,523	16.59%
Democratic	Elmer J. Halseth	3,819	14.01%
Democratic	M. A. Thrasher	3,685	13.52%
Total votes		27,257	100.00%
General election
Democratic	Jack R. Gage	41,949	61.56%
Republican	Katharine A. Morton (incumbent)	26,191	38.44%
Total votes		68,140	100.00%

1938 Wyoming Superintendent of Public Instruction election
Party	Candidate	Votes	%	±%
Republican	Esther Anderson	48,449	52.63%	+14.19%
Democratic	Jack R. Gage (incumbent)	43,606	47.37%	−14.19%
Total votes		92,055	100.00%	

1958 Wyoming Secretary of State election
Party	Candidate	Votes	%
Democratic	Jack R. Gage	55,724	50.50%
Republican	Everett Copenhaver (incumbent)	54,612	49.50%
Total votes		110,336	100.00%

1962 Wyoming Gubernatorial Democratic primary
Party	Candidate	Votes	%
Democratic	Jack R. Gage (incumbent)	21,051	55.51%
Democratic	William M. Jack	16,875	44.50%
Total votes		37,926	100.00%

1962 Wyoming Gubernatorial election
Party	Candidate	Votes	%	±%
Republican	Clifford Hansen	64,970	54.47%	+7.83%
Democratic	Jack R. Gage (incumbent)	54,298	45.53%	−3.41%
Total votes		119,268	100.00%	

1966 Wyoming Gubernatorial Democratic primary
Party	Candidate	Votes	%
Democratic	Ernest Wilkerson	13,145	31.07%
Democratic	Bill Nation	9,834	23.25%
Democratic	Jack R. Gage	8,661	20.47%
Democratic	Raymond B. Whitaker	6,238	14.75%
Democratic	Howard L. Burke	4,426	10.46%
Total votes		42,304	100.00%

Party political offices
Preceded by John J. Hickey	Democratic nominee for Governor of Wyoming; 1962	Succeeded by Ernest Wilkerson
Political offices
Preceded by Everett T. Copenhaver	Secretary of State of Wyoming; 1959-1963	Succeeded by Thyra Thomson
Preceded by John J. Hickey	Governor of Wyoming; January 2, 1961 – January 7, 1963	Succeeded by Clifford Hansen
