= Milward Simpson =

Governor of Wyoming and United States Senator (1897–1993)

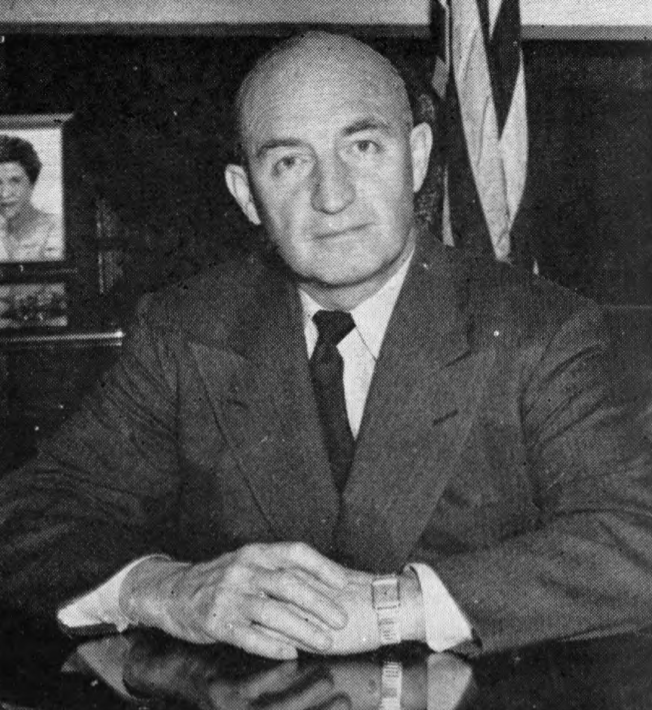
- Simpson c. 1955

United States Senator from Wyoming
- In office November 6, 1962 – January 3, 1967
- Preceded by: John J. Hickey
- Succeeded by: Clifford Hansen

23rd Governor of Wyoming
- In office January 3, 1955 – January 5, 1959
- Preceded by: Clifford Joy Rogers
- Succeeded by: John J. Hickey

Member of the Wyoming House of Representatives
- In office 1926–1927

Personal details
- Born: Milward Lee Simpson; November 12, 1897 Jackson, Wyoming, U.S.
- Died: June 11, 1993 (aged 95) Cody, Wyoming, U.S.
- Party: Republican
- Spouse: Lorna Kooi Simpson
- Children: Pete Simpson; Alan K. Simpson
- Education: University of Wyoming (BA); Harvard Law School (did not graduate)
- Profession: Attorney; businessman

Military service
- Branch/service: United States Army
- Battles/wars: World War I

Milward Lee Simpson (November 12, 1897 – June 11, 1993) was an American politician who served as a U.S. senator and as the 23rd governor of Wyoming, the first born in the state. In 1985, he was inducted into the Hall of Great Westerners of the National Cowboy & Western Heritage Museum.

== Early life ==
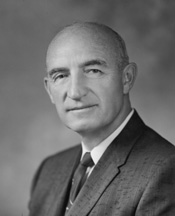
Simpson as Senator

Simpson was born in Jackson, Teton County, Wyoming, the son of Margaret Louise (née Burnett; 1874–1974) and William Lee "Billy" Simpson (1868–1940). He attended public schools in Meeteetse and Cody. He graduated from Cody High School in 1916. In June 1917, at age 19, Simpson graduated from the Tome School for Boys in Port Deposit, Maryland. As one of fifteen graduates, he was awarded Best All-Round Athlete for his outstanding performance on the school's football, basketball, and baseball teams. Franklin D. Roosevelt, who at the time was Assistant Secretary of the Navy, was the Commencement Speaker.

During World War I, Simpson served as a second lieutenant in the infantry, United States Army.

=== Higher education ===
After the war, he attended the University of Wyoming, earning a Bachelor of Arts in 1921. In university, he was both an athlete and member of the debate team. Simpson was in the same class as W. Edwards Deming (1900–1993), credited for, among other things, launching the Total Quality Management movement. He was also in the same fraternity, Alpha Tau Omega, as Glenn Parker (1898–1989), whom he appointed to the Wyoming Supreme Court when he became Governor in 1955.

From 1921 to 1923 and from 1924 to 1925, he attended Harvard Law School, but did not graduate.

=== Career ===
In 1924, while studying at Harvard, Simpson took over his father's law practice. He was admitted to the Wyoming Bar Association in 1926 and practiced law in Cody until 1955 when he became governor.

== Government service ==
Simpson served as a Republican member of the Wyoming House of Representatives for one two-year term, from 1926 to 1927. He was a member of the board of trustees of the University of Wyoming in 1939 and president of the board from 1943 to 1954. He was a member of the National Association of Governing Boards of State Universities and Allied Institutions and served as president of the body from 1952 to 1953.

Milward Simpson ran for the U.S. Senate against Joseph C. O'Mahoney in 1940, but was defeated 58.7% to 41.3%. Simpson was narrowly elected governor in November 1954. He defeated the Democrat William Jack, 56,275 (50.5 percent) to 55,163 (49.5 percent). Simpson was unseated after a single term in 1958, a heavily Democratic year nationally, after a single term in office by John J. Hickey of Rawlins in Carbon County, 55,070 (48.9 percent) to 52,488 (46.6 percent). He resumed his law practice in 1959.

Simpson won a special election on November 6, 1962, to the United States Senate to fill the vacancy caused by the death of Republican Senator-elect Edwin Keith Thomson in the term ending January 3, 1967; he was not a candidate for Senate reelection in 1966 but was succeeded by outgoing Governor Clifford Hansen of Jackson. Simpson lived in Cody until his death in 1993 at the age of 95.

=== Voting record and policies ===
As governor, Simpson advocated for, and signed into law the Wyoming Civil Rights Act of 1957, a measure aimed at abolishing racial segregation in the state. However, as a U.S. Senator, Simpson was one of six Republicans – the others being Barry Goldwater of Arizona, Norris Cotton of New Hampshire, Bourke B. Hickenlooper of Iowa, Edwin Mechem of New Mexico, and John Tower of Texas – who voted against the Civil Rights Act of 1964. Simpson voted in favor of the Voting Rights Act of 1965.

== Sports ==
Simpson played football, basketball, and baseball for the University of Wyoming in 1917, 1919–1920, and 1920–1921. He has been chronicled as the first to simultaneously serve as captain of three intercollegiate sports at the university. In 1996, Simpson was inducted into the University of Wyoming Athletics Hall of Fame.

Around 1921 and 1924, Simpson played semi-professional baseball in Red Lodge, Montana, and Cody. One of his teammates was the subsequent Lieutenant Governor and Education Superintendent Bill Dodd of Louisiana. They became close friends.

Sports Illustrated ranks Simpson, as a multisport star, Wyoming's 28th Greatest Sports Figure of the 20th Century.

== Family ==
On June 29, 1929, Simpson married Lorna Helen Kooi (1900–1995) in Sheridan, Wyoming. They had two sons, both of whom have the middle name "Kooi." The younger son, Alan K. Simpson, served in the Wyoming House from Park County from 1965 to 1977 and in the United States Senate from 1979 to 1997. Alan Simpson was the Senate Republican Whip during the early 1990s. The older son, Peter K. Simpson, is a retired historian and administrator at the University of Wyoming, who served in the state House from 1981 to 1984 representing Sheridan County, his residence during prior work for Sheridan College. Milward Simpson's grandson (by way of Alan Simpson), Colin M. Simpson, is a former member of the Wyoming House from Cody, who lost a Republican primary for governor in 2010 to Matt Mead.

Death

He died on June 11, 1993 at a nursing home in Cody, Wyoming from Parkinson's disease at the age of 95. He was buried at Riverside Cemetery in Cody, Wyoming.

== Bibliography ==
=== References ===
- Biographical Directory of the United States Congress → "Simpson, Milward Lee". Government Publishing Office. (GPO search link) LCCN 2004-114224 (2005); ISBN 0-1607-3176-3 (2005).
1. 1774–1989: Via HathiTrust. Senate document; no. 100-34. U.S. G.p.o. 1989. p. 1815.
2. 1774–2005: Pdf via GPO website (PDF). p. 1915.
3. 1774–2005: Via Google Books (limited preview). p. 1915.
- Crass, Scott M. Statesmen and Mischief Makers: Officeholders and Their Contributions to History from Kennedy to Reagan. Chapter 10: "Sons Bennett, Simpson and Dodd Followed 60s Era Senators to Chamber". Vol. 2. Xlibris. ISBN 978-1-5035-8762-5, 1-5035-8762-2; OCLC 1280797180 (all editions).
1. Via Google (limited Preview).
- Daily Telegraph (The) (January 21, 1994). "Obituaries" → "Milward Simpson" (includes portrait photo). No. 43103 (Final ed.). London. p. 21 – via Newspapers.com.
1. Transcript, from the Vertical Files of the Paw Paw Museum. Port Deposit, Maryland. Archived from the original on November 1, 2004 – via Wayback Machine.
- Ewig, Rick; Hert, Tamsen (2012). University of Wyoming. The Campus History Series. Arcadia Publishing – via Google Books (limited preview). LCCN 2012-939597; ISBN 978-0-7385-9599-3, 0-7385-9599-3; OCLC 805055602 (all editions).
- "Hall of Great Westerners". National Cowboy & Western Heritage Museum.
- Harvard Alumni Directory → "Simpson, Milward Lee". Boston: The Harvard Alumni Association (publisher). Concord, New Hampshire: Rumford Press (printer). 1926. p. 784 – via Google Books.
- Hathorn, Billy Burton (December 2011). "Book Review → Dude Ranching in Yellowstone Country: Larry Larom and Valley Ranch, 1915–1969. By W. Hudson Kensel". South Dakota History: Historic Preservation Issue. 41 (4): 458–460. ISSN 0361-8676 (publication); OCLC 5773986885 (article).

Book reviewed:

1. Kensel, William Hudson (2010). Dude Ranching in Yellowstone Country: Larry Larom and Valley Ranch, 1915–1969 (re-printed in 2022 by the University of Oklahoma Press). Norman, Oklahoma: Arthur H. Clark Company (University of Oklahoma Press). LCCN 2010-5966; ISBN 978-0-8706-2384-4, 0-8706-2384-2; OCLC 537308735 (all editions).
- Ibach, Kimberly L.; Moore, William Howard (Winter 2001). "The Emerging Civil Rights Movement: The 1957 Wyoming Public Accommodations Statute as a Case Study". Annals of Wyoming: The Wyoming History Journal. 73 (1). Wyoming State Historical Society: 2–13. LCCN 89-645942, LCCN 89-645944, LCCN 93-641479, LCCN sn96-50293, LCCN 25-4513, ISSN 0003-4991; OCLC 35913065 (all editions).
1. Via Internet Archive. Wyoming State Historical Society. 2001.
2. Re-Print via Wyoming Almanac blog. April 2, 2021.
- "Milward Simpson Papers". American Heritage Center, University of Wyoming. OCLC 27968053.
1. Browse digitized papers.
- Northern Wyoming Herald (The) (June 9, 1916). "Commencement Exercises Display Talent of Seniors". Vol. 11, no. 30. Cody, Wyoming. p. 1 – via Chronicling America. LCCN sn92066926.
- Park County Herald (February 3, 1926). "Milward L. Simpson Admitted to the Bar". Vol. 21, no. 7. Cody, Wyoming. p. 4 – via Chronicling America. LCCN sn92066928.
- Simpson, Milward (1880). The Palm. "Simpson, Congress Pep Master – On Himself" (autobiography). 50 (1): 476–477. Alpha Tau Omega (ΑΤΩ or ATO) (publisher) – via Internet Archive (University of Illinois Urbana-Champaign Library).
- Sobel, Robert; Raimo, John, eds. (1978). Biographical Directory of the Governors of the United States, 1789–1978 → "Simpson, Milward L. (1955–1959)". Vol. 4: "Rhode Island–Wyoming". Westport, Connecticut: Meckler Books. p. 1781. ISBN 9780930466008 – via Internet Archive (Kahle/Austin Foundation). LCCN 77-10435; ISBN 0-9304-6600-4; OCLC 3204818 (all editions).
- Sports Illustrated (January 3, 2000). "The Master List" (cover story). "The 50 Greatest Sports Figures of the Century From Each of the 50 States." → "Wyoming"" (ranked 28 for Wyoming: "Milward Simpson Governor was multisport star"). pp. 72–91. Archived from the original on November 21, 2020. ISSN 0038-822X, ISSN 2169-1649 (publication); OCLC 1766364 (all editions), 317648400 (publication); EBSCOhost 2615560 (article); ProQuest 213301648, ProQuest 213309354 (article) (Research Library database).
- The Sun (June 12, 1917). "Tome Graduates 15 – Eight States and One Foreign Country Represented in Class – F.D. Roosevelt Speaks". Vol. 161, no. 23. Baltimore. p. 3 – via Newspapers.com.
- "Voting Rights Act of 1965 (The)." To Pass S. 1564 – via GovTrack.
- Wyo (The) (Yearbook of the University of Wyoming). Vol. 12 (1921). – via Internet Archive (Lyrasis, Sloan Foundation, American Heritage Center). OCLC 8065613 (all editions).
1. "Juniors" → "Milward Simpson". University of Wyoming. 1920.
2. "Juniors" → "Edward Deming". University of Wyoming. 1920.
3. "Alpha Tau Omega" → "Glenn Parker". University of Wyoming. 1920.
- Wyo (The) (Yearbook of the University of Wyoming). Vol. 13 (1922). – via Internet Archive (Lyrasis, Sloan Foundation, American Heritage Center).
1. "Seniors" → "Milward Simpson". University of Wyoming. 1921.
2. "Seniors" → "Edward Deming". University of Wyoming. 1921.
3. "Juniors" → "S. Glenn Parker". University of Wyoming. 1921.
- Wyoming – 2016 Cowboy Football (media guide). 2016. pp. 224, 229, 230 – via Issuu.

=== General references ===
- "Bob Wakefield, Papers". American Heritage Center, University of Wyoming. OCLC 71435216.
- Congressional Record. "Proceedings and Debates of the 89th Congress." 2nd Session → Tributes to Milward L. Simpson of Wyoming. Vol. 112. Part 21. October 20, 1966, to October 22, 1966. Washington, D.C.: Government Printing Office. 1966. Via Internet Archive (Kahle/Austin Foundation) OCLC 1268148100.
1. Sen. Jacob Javits (October 20, 1966). "Tributes to Leverett Saltonstall and Milward Simpson". Superintendent of Government Documents. pp. 27894–27895.
2. Sen. Everett Dirksen (October 20, 1966). "Senator Milward L. Simpson". Superintendent of Government Documents. p. 27895.
3. Sen. Ralph Yarborough (October 20, 1966). "Milward Simpson, Senator, Governor, Educator, Rancher, Westerner, American". Superintendent of Government Documents. pp. 27895–27896.
4. Sen. Thomas J. Dodd (October 20, 1966). "Tribute to Senators Donald Russell and Milward Simpson". Superintendent of Government Documents. pp. 28013–28014.
5. Sen. Paul Fannin (October 20, 1966). "Legislative Achievements of Senator Simpson". Superintendent of Government Documents. pp. 28432–28433.
6. Sen. Daniel Inouye (October 20, 1966). "Senator Milward L. Simpson". Superintendent of Government Documents. p. 28436.
7. Sen. James B. Pearson (October 20, 1966). "Retirement of Senator Leverett Saltonstall and Senator Milward Simpson". Superintendent of Government Documents. p. 29005.
8. Sen. Henry M. Jackson (October 20, 1966). "Honorable Milward L. Simpson, of Wyoming". Superintendent of Government Documents. p. 29063.
9. Sen. William Proxmire (1905–2005) (October 20, 1966). "Senator Milward Simpson, of Wyoming". Superintendent of Government Documents. p. 29111.
- Congressional Quarterly's Guide to U.S. Elections → Part V: "Gubernatorial Elections". Vol. 2 (4th ed.). CQ Press. 2001. via Internet Archive (Kahle/Austin Foundation). LCCN 2001-37955; ISBN 1-5680-2602-1; OCLC 47623804 (all editions).
1. Chapter 29: "Governors of the States" → "Wyoming". 2001. p. 1413.
2. Chapter 30: "Gubernatorial General Election Returns" → "Wyoming". 2001. p. 1476.
- Dodd, William Joseph "Bill" (1991). Peapatch Politics: The Earl Long Era in Louisiana. Baton Rouge: Claitor's Publishing Division. ISBN 978-0-8751-1932-8, 0-8751-1932-8; OCLC 24234522 (all editions).
- Wakefield, Robert Wellington, PhD (born 1939) (2005). Milward L. Simpson: The Fiery Petrel. Sheridan, Wyoming: Wakefield Publishing & Wellington Press. ISBN 978-0-9754-8160-8, 0-9754-8160-6; OCLC 1059153706 (all editions).

Party political offices
Preceded by Vincent Carter	Republican nominee for U.S. Senator from Wyoming (Class 1); 1940	Succeeded by Harry B. Henderson
Preceded by Frank A. Barrett	Republican nominee for Governor of Wyoming; 1954, 1958	Succeeded by Clifford Hansen
Preceded by Edwin Keith Thomson	Republican nominee for U.S. Senator from Wyoming (Class 2); 1962	Succeeded by Clifford Hansen
Political offices
Preceded by Clifford Joy Rogers	Governor of Wyoming; January 3, 1955 – January 5, 1959	Succeeded by John J. Hickey
U.S. Senate
Preceded by John J. Hickey	U.S. senator (Class 2) from Wyoming; November 7, 1962 – January 3, 1967; Served alongside: Gale W. McGee	Succeeded by Clifford Hansen
Honorary titles
Preceded by Frank Briggs	Oldest living U.S. senator September 23, 1992 – June 10, 1993	Succeeded by Margaret Smith
