= Political party strength in Wyoming =

Politics in the US state of Wyoming

The following tables indicate the historic party affiliation of elected officials in the U.S. state of Wyoming including:

- Governor
- Secretary of State
- State Auditor
- State Treasurer
- Superintendent of Public Instruction

The tables also indicate the historical party composition in the:

- State Senate
- State House of Representatives
- State delegation to the United States Senate
- State delegation to the United States House of Representatives

For years in which a United States presidential election was held, the tables indicate which party's nominees received the State's electoral votes. Prior to statehood in 1889, there were fewer elected offices, as indicated.

== Wyoming Territory ==
Year	Executive offices		U.S. Congress
Year	Governor	Secretary of State	U.S. House (non-voting member)
1869	John Allen Campbell (R) (Note: Of Wyoming Territory.)	Edward Merwin Lee (R)	Stephen Friel Nuckolls (D)
1870	John Allen Campbell (R)	Herman Glafcke (R)	Stephen Friel Nuckolls (D)
1871	John Allen Campbell (R)	Herman Glafcke (R)	William Theopilus Jones (R)
1872	John Allen Campbell (R)	Herman Glafcke (R)	William Theopilus Jones (R)
1873	John Allen Campbell (R)	Jason B. Brown (D)	William Randolph Steele (D)
1874	John Allen Campbell (R)	Jason B. Brown (D)	William Randolph Steele (D)
1875	John Milton Thayer (R)	George W. French (R)	William Randolph Steele (D)
1876	John Milton Thayer (R)	George W. French (R)	William Randolph Steele (D)
1877	John Milton Thayer (R)	George W. French (R)	William Wellington Corlett (R)
1878	John Wesley Hoyt (R)	George W. French (R)	William Wellington Corlett (R)
1879	John Wesley Hoyt (R)	Albertis Worth Spates (R)	Stephen Wheeler Downey (R)
1880	John Wesley Hoyt (R)	Elliot S. N. Morgan (R)	Stephen Wheeler Downey (R)
1881	John Wesley Hoyt (R)	Elliot S. N. Morgan (R)	Morton Everel Post (D)
1882	William Hale (R)	Elliot S. N. Morgan (R)	Morton Everel Post (D)
1883	William Hale (R)	Elliot S. N. Morgan (R)	Morton Everel Post (D)
1884	William Hale (R)	Elliot S. N. Morgan (R)	Morton Everel Post (D)
1885	Elliot S. N. Morgan (R)	Elliot S. N. Morgan (R)	Joseph M. Carey (R)
1885	Francis E. Warren (R)	Elliot S. N. Morgan (R)	Joseph M. Carey (R)
1886	George W. Baxter (D)	Elliot S. N. Morgan (R)	Joseph M. Carey (R)
1886	Elliot S. N. Morgan (R)	Elliot S. N. Morgan (R)	Joseph M. Carey (R)
1887	Thomas Moonlight (D)	Samuel D. Shannon (D)	Joseph M. Carey (R)
1888	Thomas Moonlight (D)	Samuel D. Shannon (D)	Joseph M. Carey (R)
1889	Francis E. Warren (R)	John W. Meldrum (R)	Joseph M. Carey (R)

== State of Wyoming ==
Year	Executive offices					State Legislature		United States Congress			Electoral votes
Year	Governor	Secretary of State	Auditor	Treasurer	Supt. of Pub. Inst.	State Senate	State House	U.S. Senator (Class I)	U.S. Senator (Class II)	U.S. House	Electoral votes
1890	Francis E. Warren (R) (Note: Resigned to take an elected seat in the United States Senate.)	Amos W. Barber (R)	Charles W. Burdick (R)	Otto Gramm (R)	Stephen H. Farwell (R)	13R, 3D	26R, 7D	Francis E. Warren (R)	Joseph M. Carey (R)	Clarence D. Clark (R)	
1890	Amos W. Barber (R) (Note: As state secretary of state, acted as governor.)	Amos W. Barber (R)	Charles W. Burdick (R)	Otto Gramm (R)	Stephen H. Farwell (R)	13R, 3D	26R, 7D	Francis E. Warren (R)	Joseph M. Carey (R)	Clarence D. Clark (R)	
1891	Amos W. Barber (R)	Amos W. Barber (R)	Charles W. Burdick (R)	Otto Gramm (R)	Stephen H. Farwell (R)	13R, 3D	26R, 7D	Francis E. Warren (R)	Joseph M. Carey (R)	Clarence D. Clark (R)	
1892	Amos W. Barber (R)	Amos W. Barber (R)	Charles W. Burdick (R)	Otto Gramm (R)	Stephen H. Farwell (R)	13R, 3D	26R, 7D	Francis E. Warren (R)	Joseph M. Carey (R)	Clarence D. Clark (R)	Harrison/ Reid (R) ✗
1893	John Eugene; Osborne (D)	Amos W. Barber (R)	Charles W. Burdick (R)	Otto Gramm (R)	Stephen H. Farwell (R)	11R, 5D	16D, 12R, 5Pop (Note: A coalition of Democrats and Populists elected a Populist, L.C. Tidball, as Speaker, and organized the chamber.)	Francis E. Warren (R)	Joseph M. Carey (R)	Henry A. Coffeen (D)	Harrison/ Reid (R) ✗
1894	John Eugene; Osborne (D)	Amos W. Barber (R)	Charles W. Burdick (R)	Otto Gramm (R)	Stephen H. Farwell (R)	11R, 5D	16D, 12R, 5Pop	vacant	Joseph M. Carey (R)	Henry A. Coffeen (D)	Harrison/ Reid (R) ✗
1895	William A. Richards (R)	Charles W. Burdick (R)	William O. Owen (R)	Henry G. Hay (R)	Estelle Reel (R) (Note: Resigned.)	14R, 4D	34R, 2D, 1Pop	Clarence D. Clark (R)	Francis E. Warren (R)	Frank W. Mondell (R)	Harrison/ Reid (R) ✗
1896	William A. Richards (R)	Charles W. Burdick (R)	William O. Owen (R)	Henry G. Hay (R)	Estelle Reel (R)	14R, 4D	34R, 2D, 1Pop	Clarence D. Clark (R)	Francis E. Warren (R)	Frank W. Mondell (R)	Bryan/ Sewall (D) ✗
1897	William A. Richards (R)	Charles W. Burdick (R)	William O. Owen (R)	Henry G. Hay (R)	Estelle Reel (R)	14R, 4D, 1SvD	23R, 11D, 3Fus, 1Pop	Clarence D. Clark (R)	Francis E. Warren (R)	John Eugene; Osborne (D)	Bryan/ Sewall (D) ✗
1898	William A. Richards (R)	Charles W. Burdick (R)	William O. Owen (R)	Henry G. Hay (R)	Charles Parmelee (D) (Note: Appointed to fill vacancy.)	14R, 4D, 1SvD	23R, 11D, 3Fus, 1Pop	Clarence D. Clark (R)	Francis E. Warren (R)	John Eugene; Osborne (D)	Bryan/ Sewall (D) ✗
1899	DeForest Richards (R) (Note: Died in office.)	Fenimore; Chatterton (R)	LeRoy Grant (R)	George E. Abbott (R)	Thomas T. Tynan (R)	13R, 6D	35R, 3D	Clarence D. Clark (R)	Francis E. Warren (R)	Frank W. Mondell (R)	Bryan/ Sewall (D) ✗
1900	DeForest Richards (R)	Fenimore; Chatterton (R)	LeRoy Grant (R)	George E. Abbott (R)	Thomas T. Tynan (R)	13R, 6D	35R, 3D	Clarence D. Clark (R)	Francis E. Warren (R)	Frank W. Mondell (R)	McKinley/ Roosevelt (R) ✓
1901	DeForest Richards (R)	Fenimore; Chatterton (R)	LeRoy Grant (R)	George E. Abbott (R)	Thomas T. Tynan (R)	16R, 2D, 1Pop	36R, 2D	Clarence D. Clark (R)	Francis E. Warren (R)	Frank W. Mondell (R)	McKinley/ Roosevelt (R) ✓
1902	DeForest Richards (R)	Fenimore; Chatterton (R)	LeRoy Grant (R)	George E. Abbott (R)	Thomas T. Tynan (R)	16R, 2D, 1Pop	36R, 2D	Clarence D. Clark (R)	Francis E. Warren (R)	Frank W. Mondell (R)	McKinley/ Roosevelt (R) ✓
1903	Fenimore; Chatterton (R)	Fenimore; Chatterton (R)	LeRoy Grant (R)	William C. Irvine (R)	Thomas T. Tynan (R)	21R, 2D	46R, 4D	Clarence D. Clark (R)	Francis E. Warren (R)	Frank W. Mondell (R)	McKinley/ Roosevelt (R) ✓
1904	Fenimore; Chatterton (R)	Fenimore; Chatterton (R)	LeRoy Grant (R)	William C. Irvine (R)	Thomas T. Tynan (R)	21R, 2D	46R, 4D	Clarence D. Clark (R)	Francis E. Warren (R)	Frank W. Mondell (R)	Roosevelt/ Fairbanks (R) ✓
1905	Bryant Butler; Brooks (R)	Fenimore; Chatterton (R)	LeRoy Grant (R)	William C. Irvine (R)	Thomas T. Tynan (R)	20R, 3D	47R, 3D	Clarence D. Clark (R)	Francis E. Warren (R)	Frank W. Mondell (R)	Roosevelt/ Fairbanks (R) ✓
1906	Bryant Butler; Brooks (R)	Fenimore; Chatterton (R)	LeRoy Grant (R)	William C. Irvine (R)	Thomas T. Tynan (R)	20R, 3D	47R, 3D	Clarence D. Clark (R)	Francis E. Warren (R)	Frank W. Mondell (R)	Roosevelt/ Fairbanks (R) ✓
1907	Bryant Butler; Brooks (R)	William Schnitger (R)	LeRoy Grant (R)	Edward H. Gillette (R)	Archibald D. Cook (R)	21R, 2D	45R, 5D	Clarence D. Clark (R)	Francis E. Warren (R)	Frank W. Mondell (R)	Roosevelt/ Fairbanks (R) ✓
1908	Bryant Butler; Brooks (R)	William Schnitger (R)	LeRoy Grant (R)	Edward H. Gillette (R)	Archibald D. Cook (R)	21R, 2D	45R, 5D	Clarence D. Clark (R)	Francis E. Warren (R)	Frank W. Mondell (R)	Taft/ Sherman (R) ✓
1909	Bryant Butler; Brooks (R)	William Schnitger (R)	LeRoy Grant (R)	Edward H. Gillette (R)	Archibald D. Cook (R)	24R, 3D	49R, 7D	Clarence D. Clark (R)	Francis E. Warren (R)	Frank W. Mondell (R)	Taft/ Sherman (R) ✓
1910	Bryant Butler; Brooks (R)	William Schnitger (R)	LeRoy Grant (R)	Edward H. Gillette (R)	Archibald D. Cook (R)	24R, 3D	49R, 7D	Clarence D. Clark (R)	Francis E. Warren (R)	Frank W. Mondell (R)	Taft/ Sherman (R) ✓
1911	Joseph M. Carey (D) (Note: Helped to organize the national Progressive Party in 1912.)	Frank L. Houx (D)	Robert B. Forsyth (R)	John L. Baird (R)	Rose A. Bird Maley (R)	21R, 6D	31R, 25D	Clarence D. Clark (R)	Francis E. Warren (R)	Frank W. Mondell (R)	Taft/ Sherman (R) ✓
1912	Joseph M. Carey (Prog)	Frank L. Houx (D)	Robert B. Forsyth (R)	John L. Baird (R)	Rose A. Bird Maley (R)	21R, 6D	31R, 25D	Clarence D. Clark (R)	Francis E. Warren (R)	Frank W. Mondell (R)	Wilson/ Marshall (D) ✓
1913	Joseph M. Carey (Prog)	Frank L. Houx (D)	Robert B. Forsyth (R)	John L. Baird (R)	Rose A. Bird Maley (R)	19R, 8D	29R, 28D	Clarence D. Clark (R)	Francis E. Warren (R)	Frank W. Mondell (R)	Wilson/ Marshall (D) ✓
1914	Joseph M. Carey (Prog)	Frank L. Houx (D)	Robert B. Forsyth (R)	John L. Baird (R)	Rose A. Bird Maley (R)	19R, 8D	29R, 28D	Clarence D. Clark (R)	Francis E. Warren (R)	Frank W. Mondell (R)	Wilson/ Marshall (D) ✓
1915	John B. Kendrick (D)	Frank L. Houx (D)	Robert B. Forsyth (R)	Herman B. Gates (R)	Edith K. O. Clark (R)	18R, 9D	42R, 15D	Clarence D. Clark (R)	Francis E. Warren (R)	Frank W. Mondell (R)	Wilson/ Marshall (D) ✓
1916	John B. Kendrick (D)	Frank L. Houx (D)	Robert B. Forsyth (R)	Herman B. Gates (R)	Edith K. O. Clark (R)	18R, 9D	42R, 15D	Clarence D. Clark (R)	Francis E. Warren (R)	Frank W. Mondell (R)	Wilson/ Marshall (D) ✓
1917	Frank L. Houx (D)	Frank L. Houx (D)	Robert B. Forsyth (R)	Herman B. Gates (R)	Edith K. O. Clark (R)	16R, 11D	32R, 25D	John B. Kendrick (D)	Francis E. Warren (R)	Frank W. Mondell (R)	Wilson/ Marshall (D) ✓
1918	Frank L. Houx (D)	Frank L. Houx (D)	Robert B. Forsyth (R)	Herman B. Gates (R)	Edith K. O. Clark (R)	16R, 11D	32R, 25D	John B. Kendrick (D)	Francis E. Warren (R)	Frank W. Mondell (R)	Wilson/ Marshall (D) ✓
1919	Robert D. Carey (R)	William E. Chaplin (R)	I. C. Jefferis (R)	A. D. Hoskins (R)	Katherine A. Morton (R)	17R, 10D	43R, 11D	John B. Kendrick (D)	Francis E. Warren (R)	Frank W. Mondell (R)	Wilson/ Marshall (D) ✓
1920	Robert D. Carey (R)	William E. Chaplin (R)	I. C. Jefferis (R)	A. D. Hoskins (R)	Katherine A. Morton (R)	17R, 10D	43R, 11D	John B. Kendrick (D)	Francis E. Warren (R)	Frank W. Mondell (R)	Harding/ Coolidge (R) ✓
1921	Robert D. Carey (R)	William E. Chaplin (R)	I. C. Jefferis (R)	A. D. Hoskins (R)	Katherine A. Morton (R)	22R, 3D	53R, 1D	John B. Kendrick (D)	Francis E. Warren (R)	Frank W. Mondell (R)	Harding/ Coolidge (R) ✓
1922	Robert D. Carey (R)	William E. Chaplin (R)	I. C. Jefferis (R)	A. D. Hoskins (R)	Katherine A. Morton (R)	22R, 3D	53R, 1D	John B. Kendrick (D)	Francis E. Warren (R)	Frank W. Mondell (R)	Harding/ Coolidge (R) ✓
1923	William B. Ross (D)	Frank Lucas (R)	Vincent Carter (R)	John M. Snyder (R)	Katherine A. Morton (R)	20R, 5D	37R, 23D	John B. Kendrick (D)	Francis E. Warren (R)	Charles E. Winter (R)	Harding/ Coolidge (R) ✓
1924	Frank Lucas (R)	Frank Lucas (R)	Vincent Carter (R)	John M. Snyder (R)	Katherine A. Morton (R)	20R, 5D	37R, 23D	John B. Kendrick (D)	Francis E. Warren (R)	Charles E. Winter (R)	Coolidge/ Dawes (R) ✓
1925	Nellie Tayloe Ross (D)	Frank Lucas (R)	Vincent Carter (R)	John M. Snyder (R)	Katherine A. Morton (R)	16R, 11D	39R, 23D	John B. Kendrick (D)	Francis E. Warren (R)	Charles E. Winter (R)	Coolidge/ Dawes (R) ✓
1926	Nellie Tayloe Ross (D)	Frank Lucas (R)	Vincent Carter (R)	John M. Snyder (R)	Katherine A. Morton (R)	16R, 11D	39R, 23D	John B. Kendrick (D)	Francis E. Warren (R)	Charles E. Winter (R)	Coolidge/ Dawes (R) ✓
1927	Frank Emerson (R)	Alonzo M. Clark (R)	Vincent Carter (R)	William H. Edelman (R)	Katherine A. Morton (R)	15R, 12D	45R, 17D	John B. Kendrick (D)	Francis E. Warren (R)	Charles E. Winter (R)	Coolidge/ Dawes (R) ✓
1928	Frank Emerson (R)	Alonzo M. Clark (R)	Vincent Carter (R)	William H. Edelman (R)	Katherine A. Morton (R)	15R, 12D	45R, 17D	John B. Kendrick (D)	Francis E. Warren (R)	Charles E. Winter (R)	Hoover/ Curtis (R) ✓
1929	Frank Emerson (R)	Alonzo M. Clark (R)	Roscoe Alcorn (R)	William H. Edelman (R)	Katherine A. Morton (R)	17R, 10D	51R, 11D	John B. Kendrick (D)	Patrick J. Sullivan (R)	Vincent Carter (R)	Hoover/ Curtis (R) ✓
1930	Frank Emerson (R)	Alonzo M. Clark (R)	Roscoe Alcorn (R)	William H. Edelman (R)	Katherine A. Morton (R)	17R, 10D	51R, 11D	John B. Kendrick (D)	Robert D. Carey (R)	Vincent Carter (R)	Hoover/ Curtis (R) ✓
1931	Alonzo M. Clark (R)	Alonzo M. Clark (R)	Roscoe Alcorn (R)	Harry R. Weston (R)	Katherine A. Morton (R)	21R, 6D	36R, 26D	John B. Kendrick (D)	Robert D. Carey (R)	Vincent Carter (R)	Hoover/ Curtis (R) ✓
1932	Alonzo M. Clark (R)	Alonzo M. Clark (R)	Roscoe Alcorn (R)	Harry R. Weston (R)	Katherine A. Morton (R)	21R, 6D	36R, 26D	John B. Kendrick (D)	Robert D. Carey (R)	Vincent Carter (R)	Roosevelt/ Garner (D) ✓
1933	Leslie A. Miller (D)	Alonzo M. Clark (R)	Roscoe Alcorn (R)	Harry R. Weston (R)	Katherine A. Morton (R)	15R, 12D	42D, 20R	John B. Kendrick (D)	Robert D. Carey (R)	Vincent Carter (R)	Roosevelt/ Garner (D) ✓
1934	Leslie A. Miller (D)	Alonzo M. Clark (R)	Roscoe Alcorn (R)	Harry R. Weston (R)	Katherine A. Morton (R)	15R, 12D	42D, 20R	Joseph C. O'Mahoney (D)	Robert D. Carey (R)	Vincent Carter (R)	Roosevelt/ Garner (D) ✓
1935	Leslie A. Miller (D)	Lester C. Hunt (D)	William M. Jack (D)	J. Kirk Baldwin (D)	Jack R. Gage (D)	14D, 13R	38D, 18R	Joseph C. O'Mahoney (D)	Robert D. Carey (R)	Paul Ranous; Greever (D)	Roosevelt/ Garner (D) ✓
1936	Leslie A. Miller (D)	Lester C. Hunt (D)	William M. Jack (D)	J. Kirk Baldwin (D)	Jack R. Gage (D)	14D, 13R	38D, 18R	Joseph C. O'Mahoney (D)	Robert D. Carey (R)	Paul Ranous; Greever (D)	Roosevelt/ Garner (D) ✓
1937	Leslie A. Miller (D)	Lester C. Hunt (D)	William M. Jack (D)	J. Kirk Baldwin (D)	Jack R. Gage (D)	16D, 11R	38D, 18R	Joseph C. O'Mahoney (D)	Harry Schwartz (D)	Paul Ranous; Greever (D)	Roosevelt/ Garner (D) ✓
1938	Leslie A. Miller (D)	Lester C. Hunt (D)	William M. Jack (D)	J. Kirk Baldwin (D)	Jack R. Gage (D)	16D, 11R	38D, 18R	Joseph C. O'Mahoney (D)	Harry Schwartz (D)	Paul Ranous; Greever (D)	Roosevelt/ Garner (D) ✓
1939	Nels H. Smith (R)	Lester C. Hunt (D)	William M. Jack (D)	Mart T. Christensen (R)	Esther L. Anderson (R)	16R, 11D	37R, 19D	Joseph C. O'Mahoney (D)	Harry Schwartz (D)	Frank O. Horton (R)	Roosevelt/ Garner (D) ✓
1940	Nels H. Smith (R)	Lester C. Hunt (D)	William M. Jack (D)	Mart T. Christensen (R)	Esther L. Anderson (R)	16R, 11D	37R, 19D	Joseph C. O'Mahoney (D)	Harry Schwartz (D)	Frank O. Horton (R)	Roosevelt/ Wallace (D) ✓
1941	Nels H. Smith (R)	Lester C. Hunt (D)	William M. Jack (D)	Mart T. Christensen (R)	Esther L. Anderson (R)	16R, 11D	28R, 28D (Note: Elected a Democrat, Carl Robinson, as Speaker.)	Joseph C. O'Mahoney (D)	Harry Schwartz (D)	John J. McIntyre (D)	Roosevelt/ Wallace (D) ✓
1942	Nels H. Smith (R)	Lester C. Hunt (D)	William M. Jack (D)	Mart T. Christensen (R)	Esther L. Anderson (R)	16R, 11D	28R, 28D	Joseph C. O'Mahoney (D)	Harry Schwartz (D)	John J. McIntyre (D)	Roosevelt/ Wallace (D) ✓
1943	Lester C. Hunt (D)	Mart T. Christensen (R)	William M. Jack (D)	Earl Wright (R)	Esther L. Anderson (R)	17R, 10D	39R, 17D	Joseph C. O'Mahoney (D)	Edward V. Robertson (R)	Frank A. Barrett (R)	Roosevelt/ Wallace (D) ✓
1944	Lester C. Hunt (D)	William M. Jack (D)	Carl Robinson (D)	Earl Wright (R)	Esther L. Anderson (R)	17R, 10D	39R, 17D	Joseph C. O'Mahoney (D)	Edward V. Robertson (R)	Frank A. Barrett (R)	Dewey/ Bricker (R) ✗
1944	Lester C. Hunt (D)	William M. Jack (D)	John J. McIntyre (D)	Earl Wright (R)	Esther L. Anderson (R)	17R, 10D	39R, 17D	Joseph C. O'Mahoney (D)	Edward V. Robertson (R)	Frank A. Barrett (R)	Dewey/ Bricker (R) ✗
1945	Lester C. Hunt (D)	William M. Jack (D)	John J. McIntyre (D)	Earl Wright (R)	Esther L. Anderson (R)	21R, 6D	35R, 20D	Joseph C. O'Mahoney (D)	Edward V. Robertson (R)	Frank A. Barrett (R)	Dewey/ Bricker (R) ✗
1946	Lester C. Hunt (D)	William M. Jack (D)	John J. McIntyre (D)	Earl Wright (R)	Esther L. Anderson (R)	21R, 6D	35R, 20D	Joseph C. O'Mahoney (D)	Edward V. Robertson (R)	Frank A. Barrett (R)	Dewey/ Bricker (R) ✗
1947	Lester C. Hunt (D)	Arthur G. Crane (R)	Everett T. Copenhaver (R)	Clifford Joy; Rogers (R)	Edna B. Stolt (R)	19R, 8D	44R, 12D	Joseph C. O'Mahoney (D)	Edward V. Robertson (R)	Frank A. Barrett (R)	Dewey/ Bricker (R) ✗
1948	Lester C. Hunt (D)	Arthur G. Crane (R)	Everett T. Copenhaver (R)	Clifford Joy; Rogers (R)	Edna B. Stolt (R)	19R, 8D	44R, 12D	Joseph C. O'Mahoney (D)	Edward V. Robertson (R)	Frank A. Barrett (R)	Truman/ Barkley (D) ✓
1949	Arthur G. Crane (R)	Arthur G. Crane (R)	Everett T. Copenhaver (R)	Clifford Joy; Rogers (R)	Edna B. Stolt (R)	18R, 9D	28R, 28D (Note: Elected a Republican, Herman D. Mayland, as Speaker.)	Joseph C. O'Mahoney (D)	Lester C. Hunt (D)	Frank A. Barrett (R)	Truman/ Barkley (D) ✓
1950	Arthur G. Crane (R)	Arthur G. Crane (R)	Everett T. Copenhaver (R)	Clifford Joy; Rogers (R)	Edna B. Stolt (R)	18R, 9D	28R, 28D	Joseph C. O'Mahoney (D)	Lester C. Hunt (D)	Frank A. Barrett (R)	Truman/ Barkley (D) ✓
1951	Frank A. Barrett (R)	Clifford Joy; Rogers (R)	Everett T. Copenhaver (R)	J. R. Mitchell (R)	Edna B. Stolt (R)	17R, 10D	39R, 17D	Joseph C. O'Mahoney (D)	Lester C. Hunt (D)	William Henry; Harrison III (R)	Truman/ Barkley (D) ✓
1952	Frank A. Barrett (R)	Clifford Joy; Rogers (R)	Everett T. Copenhaver (R)	Minnie A. Mitchell (R) (Note: Initially appointed to fill vacancy; later elected in his or her own right.)	Edna B. Stolt (R)	17R, 10D	39R, 17D	Joseph C. O'Mahoney (D)	Lester C. Hunt (D)	William Henry; Harrison III (R)	Eisenhower/ Nixon (R) ✓
1953	Clifford Joy; Rogers (R)	Clifford Joy; Rogers (R)	Everett T. Copenhaver (R)	Minnie A. Mitchell (R)	Edna B. Stolt (R)	21R, 6D	45R, 11D	Frank A. Barrett (R)	Lester C. Hunt (D)	William Henry; Harrison III (R)	Eisenhower/ Nixon (R) ✓
1954	Clifford Joy; Rogers (R)	Clifford Joy; Rogers (R)	Everett T. Copenhaver (R)	Minnie A. Mitchell (R)	Edna B. Stolt (R)	21R, 6D	45R, 11D	Frank A. Barrett (R)	Edward D. Crippa (R)	William Henry; Harrison III (R)	Eisenhower/ Nixon (R) ✓
1954	Clifford Joy; Rogers (R)	Clifford Joy; Rogers (R)	Everett T. Copenhaver (R)	Minnie A. Mitchell (R)	Edna B. Stolt (R)	21R, 6D	45R, 11D	Frank A. Barrett (R)	Joseph C. O'Mahoney (D)	William Henry; Harrison III (R)	Eisenhower/ Nixon (R) ✓
1955	Milward Simpson (R)	Everett T. Copenhaver (R)	Minnie A. Mitchell (R)	Charles B. Morgan (R)	Velma Linford (D)	19R, 8D	32R, 24D	Frank A. Barrett (R)	Joseph C. O'Mahoney (D)	Keith Thomson (R)	Eisenhower/ Nixon (R) ✓
1956	Milward Simpson (R)	Everett T. Copenhaver (R)	Minnie A. Mitchell (R)	Charles B. Morgan (R)	Velma Linford (D)	19R, 8D	32R, 24D	Frank A. Barrett (R)	Joseph C. O'Mahoney (D)	Keith Thomson (R)	Eisenhower/ Nixon (R) ✓
1957	Milward Simpson (R)	Everett T. Copenhaver (R)	Minnie A. Mitchell (R)	Charles B. Morgan (R)	Velma Linford (D)	16R, 11D	30R, 26D	Frank A. Barrett (R)	Joseph C. O'Mahoney (D)	Keith Thomson (R)	Eisenhower/ Nixon (R) ✓
1958	Milward Simpson (R)	Everett T. Copenhaver (R)	Minnie A. Mitchell (R)	Charles B. Morgan (R)	Velma Linford (D)	16R, 11D	30R, 26D	Frank A. Barrett (R)	Joseph C. O'Mahoney (D)	Keith Thomson (R)	Eisenhower/ Nixon (R) ✓
1959	Joe Hickey (D) (Note: Resigned to take an appointed seat in the United States Senate.)	Jack R. Gage (D)	Minnie A. Mitchell (R)	Clifford Joy; Rogers (R)	Velma Linford (D)	16R, 11D	30D, 26R	Gale W. McGee (D)	Joseph C. O'Mahoney (D)	Keith Thomson (R)	Eisenhower/ Nixon (R) ✓
1960	Joe Hickey (D)	Jack R. Gage (D)	Minnie A. Mitchell (R)	Clifford Joy; Rogers (R)	Velma Linford (D)	16R, 11D	30D, 26R	Gale W. McGee (D)	Joseph C. O'Mahoney (D)	Keith Thomson (R)	Nixon/ Lodge (R) ✗
1961	Jack R. Gage (D)	Jack R. Gage (D)	Minnie A. Mitchell (R)	Clifford Joy; Rogers (R)	Velma Linford (D)	17R, 10D	35R, 21D	Gale W. McGee (D)	Joe Hickey (D)	William Henry; Harrison III (R)	Nixon/ Lodge (R) ✗
1962	Jack R. Gage (D)	Jack R. Gage (D)	Minnie A. Mitchell (R)	Richard J. Luman (R) (Note: As deputy state treasurer, assumed the duties of treasurer.)	Velma Linford (D)	17R, 10D	35R, 21D	Gale W. McGee (D)	Milward Simpson (R)	William Henry; Harrison III (R)	Nixon/ Lodge (R) ✗
1963	Clifford Hansen (R)	Thyra Thomson (R)	Minnie A. Mitchell (R)	Everett T. Copenhaver (R)	Cecil M. Shaw (R)	16R, 11D	37R, 19D	Gale W. McGee (D)	Milward Simpson (R)	William Henry; Harrison III (R)	Nixon/ Lodge (R) ✗
1964	Clifford Hansen (R)	Thyra Thomson (R)	Minnie A. Mitchell (R)	Everett T. Copenhaver (R)	Cecil M. Shaw (R)	16R, 11D	37R, 19D	Gale W. McGee (D)	Milward Simpson (R)	William Henry; Harrison III (R)	Johnson/ Humphrey (D) ✓
1965	Clifford Hansen (R)	Thyra Thomson (R)	Minnie A. Mitchell (R)	Everett T. Copenhaver (R)	Cecil M. Shaw (R)	13R, 12D	34D, 27R	Gale W. McGee (D)	Milward Simpson (R)	Teno Roncalio (D)	Johnson/ Humphrey (D) ✓
1966	Clifford Hansen (R)	Thyra Thomson (R)	Minnie A. Mitchell (R)	Everett T. Copenhaver (R)	Cecil M. Shaw (R)	13R, 12D	34D, 27R	Gale W. McGee (D)	Milward Simpson (R)	Teno Roncalio (D)	Johnson/ Humphrey (D) ✓
1967	Stanley K. Hathaway (R)	Thyra Thomson (R)	Everett T. Copenhaver (R)	Minnie A. Mitchell (R)	Harry Roberts (R)	18R, 12D	34R, 27D	Gale W. McGee (D)	Clifford Hansen (R)	William Henry; Harrison III (R)	Johnson/ Humphrey (D) ✓
1968	Stanley K. Hathaway (R)	Thyra Thomson (R)	Everett T. Copenhaver (R)	Minnie A. Mitchell (R)	Harry Roberts (R)	18R, 12D	34R, 27D	Gale W. McGee (D)	Clifford Hansen (R)	William Henry; Harrison III (R)	Nixon/ Agnew (R) ✓
1969	Stanley K. Hathaway (R)	Thyra Thomson (R)	Everett T. Copenhaver (R)	Minnie A. Mitchell (R)	Harry Roberts (R)	18R, 12D	45R, 16D	Gale W. McGee (D)	Clifford Hansen (R)	John S. Wold (R)	Nixon/ Agnew (R) ✓
1970	Stanley K. Hathaway (R)	Thyra Thomson (R)	Everett T. Copenhaver (R)	Minnie A. Mitchell (R)	Harry Roberts (R)	18R, 12D	45R, 16D	Gale W. McGee (D)	Clifford Hansen (R)	John S. Wold (R)	Nixon/ Agnew (R) ✓
1971	Stanley K. Hathaway (R)	Thyra Thomson (R)	Everett T. Copenhaver (R)	James B. Griffith (R)	Robert G. Schrader (R)	19R, 11D	40R, 20D, 1I	Gale W. McGee (D)	Clifford Hansen (R)	Teno Roncalio (D)	Nixon/ Agnew (R) ✓
1972	Stanley K. Hathaway (R)	Thyra Thomson (R)	Everett T. Copenhaver (R)	James B. Griffith (R)	Robert G. Schrader (R)	19R, 11D	40R, 20D, 1I	Gale W. McGee (D)	Clifford Hansen (R)	Teno Roncalio (D)	Nixon/ Agnew (R) ✓
1973	Stanley K. Hathaway (R)	Thyra Thomson (R)	Edwin J. Witzenburger (R)	James B. Griffith (R)	Robert G. Schrader (R)	17R, 13D	44R, 17D, 1I	Gale W. McGee (D)	Clifford Hansen (R)	Teno Roncalio (D)	Nixon/ Agnew (R) ✓
1974	Stanley K. Hathaway (R)	Thyra Thomson (R)	Edwin J. Witzenburger (R)	James B. Griffith (R)	Robert G. Schrader (R)	17R, 13D	44R, 17D, 1I	Gale W. McGee (D)	Clifford Hansen (R)	Teno Roncalio (D)	Nixon/ Agnew (R) ✓
1975	Edgar Herschler (D)	Thyra Thomson (R)	James B. Griffith (R)	Edwin J. Witzenburger (R)	Robert G. Schrader (R)	15R, 15D (Note: With a coin flip, the Democrats received the Senate Presidency under J.W. Myers, and control of committees alternated between each party also with a coin flip for the first committee.)	32R, 29D, 1I	Gale W. McGee (D)	Clifford Hansen (R)	Teno Roncalio (D)	Nixon/ Agnew (R) ✓
1976	Edgar Herschler (D)	Thyra Thomson (R)	James B. Griffith (R)	Edwin J. Witzenburger (R)	Robert G. Schrader (R)	15R, 15D	32R, 29D, 1I	Gale W. McGee (D)	Clifford Hansen (R)	Teno Roncalio (D)	Ford/ Dole ✗
1977	Edgar Herschler (D)	Thyra Thomson (R)	James B. Griffith (R)	Edwin J. Witzenburger (R)	Robert G. Schrader (R)	18R, 12D	32R, 29D, 1I	Malcolm Wallop (R)	Clifford Hansen (R)	Teno Roncalio (D)	Ford/ Dole ✗
1978	Edgar Herschler (D)	Thyra Thomson (R)	James B. Griffith (R)	Edwin J. Witzenburger (R)	Robert G. Schrader (R)	18R, 12D	32R, 29D, 1I	Malcolm Wallop (R)	Clifford Hansen (R)	Teno Roncalio (D)	Ford/ Dole ✗
1979	Edgar Herschler (D)	Thyra Thomson (R)	James B. Griffith (R)	Shirley Wittler (R)	Lynn Simons (D)	19R, 11D	42R, 20D	Malcolm Wallop (R)	Alan Simpson (R)	Dick Cheney (R)	Ford/ Dole ✗
1980	Edgar Herschler (D)	Thyra Thomson (R)	James B. Griffith (R)	Shirley Wittler (R)	Lynn Simons (D)	19R, 11D	42R, 20D	Malcolm Wallop (R)	Alan Simpson (R)	Dick Cheney (R)	Reagan/ Bush (R) ✓
1981	Edgar Herschler (D)	Thyra Thomson (R)	James B. Griffith (R)	Shirley Wittler (R)	Lynn Simons (D)	19R, 11D	39R, 23D	Malcolm Wallop (R)	Alan Simpson (R)	Dick Cheney (R)	Reagan/ Bush (R) ✓
1982	Edgar Herschler (D)	Thyra Thomson (R)	James B. Griffith (R)	Shirley Wittler (R)	Lynn Simons (D)	19R, 11D	39R, 23D	Malcolm Wallop (R)	Alan Simpson (R)	Dick Cheney (R)	Reagan/ Bush (R) ✓
1983	Edgar Herschler (D)	Thyra Thomson (R)	James B. Griffith (R)	Stan Smith (R)	Lynn Simons (D)	19R, 11D	38R, 25D, 1I	Malcolm Wallop (R)	Alan Simpson (R)	Dick Cheney (R)	Reagan/ Bush (R) ✓
1984	Edgar Herschler (D)	Thyra Thomson (R)	James B. Griffith (R)	Stan Smith (R)	Lynn Simons (D)	19R, 11D	38R, 25D, 1I	Malcolm Wallop (R)	Alan Simpson (R)	Dick Cheney (R)	Reagan/ Bush (R) ✓
1985	Edgar Herschler (D)	Thyra Thomson (R)	James B. Griffith (R)	Stan Smith (R)	Lynn Simons (D)	19R, 11D	46R, 18D	Malcolm Wallop (R)	Alan Simpson (R)	Dick Cheney (R)	Reagan/ Bush (R) ✓
1986	Edgar Herschler (D)	Thyra Thomson (R)	James B. Griffith (R)	Stan Smith (R)	Lynn Simons (D)	19R, 11D	46R, 18D	Malcolm Wallop (R)	Alan Simpson (R)	Dick Cheney (R)	Reagan/ Bush (R) ✓
1987	Mike Sullivan (D)	Kathy Karpan (D)	Jack Sidi (R)	Stan Smith (R)	Lynn Simons (D)	19R, 11D	44R, 20D	Malcolm Wallop (R)	Alan Simpson (R)	Dick Cheney (R)	Reagan/ Bush (R) ✓
1988	Mike Sullivan (D)	Kathy Karpan (D)	Jack Sidi (R)	Stan Smith (R)	Lynn Simons (D)	19R, 11D	44R, 20D	Malcolm Wallop (R)	Alan Simpson (R)	Dick Cheney (R)	Bush/ Quayle (R) ✓
1989	Mike Sullivan (D)	Kathy Karpan (D)	Jack Sidi (R)	Stan Smith (R)	Lynn Simons (D)	19R, 11D	43R, 21D	Malcolm Wallop (R)	Alan Simpson (R)	Craig L. Thomas (R)	Bush/ Quayle (R) ✓
1990	Mike Sullivan (D)	Kathy Karpan (D)	Jack Sidi (R)	Stan Smith (R)	Lynn Simons (D)	19R, 11D	43R, 21D	Malcolm Wallop (R)	Alan Simpson (R)	Craig L. Thomas (R)	Bush/ Quayle (R) ✓
1991	Mike Sullivan (D)	Kathy Karpan (D)	Dave Ferrari (R)	Stan Smith (R)	Diana Ohman (R)	20R, 10D	42R, 22D	Malcolm Wallop (R)	Alan Simpson (R)	Craig L. Thomas (R)	Bush/ Quayle (R) ✓
1992	Mike Sullivan (D)	Kathy Karpan (D)	Dave Ferrari (R)	Stan Smith (R)	Diana Ohman (R)	20R, 10D	42R, 22D	Malcolm Wallop (R)	Alan Simpson (R)	Craig L. Thomas (R)	Bush/ Quayle (R) ✗
1993	Mike Sullivan (D)	Kathy Karpan (D)	Dave Ferrari (R)	Stan Smith (R)	Diana Ohman (R)	20R, 10D	41R, 19D	Malcolm Wallop (R)	Alan Simpson (R)	Craig L. Thomas (R)	Bush/ Quayle (R) ✗
1994	Mike Sullivan (D)	Kathy Karpan (D)	Dave Ferrari (R)	Stan Smith (R)	Diana Ohman (R)	20R, 10D	41R, 19D	Malcolm Wallop (R)	Alan Simpson (R)	Craig L. Thomas (R)	Bush/ Quayle (R) ✗
1995	Jim Geringer (R)	Diana Ohman (R)	Dave Ferrari (R)	Stan Smith (R)	Judy Catchpole (R)	20R, 10D	47R, 13D	Craig L. Thomas (R)	Alan Simpson (R)	Barbara Cubin (R)	Bush/ Quayle (R) ✗
1996	Jim Geringer (R)	Diana Ohman (R)	Dave Ferrari (R)	Stan Smith (R)	Judy Catchpole (R)	20R, 10D	47R, 13D	Craig L. Thomas (R)	Alan Simpson (R)	Barbara Cubin (R)	Dole/ Kemp (R) ✗
1997	Jim Geringer (R)	Diana Ohman (R)	Dave Ferrari (R)	Stan Smith (R)	Judy Catchpole (R)	21R, 9D	43R, 17D	Craig L. Thomas (R)	Mike Enzi (R)	Barbara Cubin (R)	Dole/ Kemp (R) ✗
1998	Jim Geringer (R)	Diana Ohman (R)	Dave Ferrari (R)	Stan Smith (R)	Judy Catchpole (R)	21R, 9D	43R, 17D	Craig L. Thomas (R)	Mike Enzi (R)	Barbara Cubin (R)	Dole/ Kemp (R) ✗
1999	Jim Geringer (R)	Joseph Meyer (R)	Max Maxfield (R)	Cynthia Lummis (R)	Judy Catchpole (R)	21R, 9D	43R, 17D	Craig L. Thomas (R)	Mike Enzi (R)	Barbara Cubin (R)	Dole/ Kemp (R) ✗
2000	Jim Geringer (R)	Joseph Meyer (R)	Max Maxfield (R)	Cynthia Lummis (R)	Judy Catchpole (R)	21R, 9D	43R, 17D	Craig L. Thomas (R)	Mike Enzi (R)	Barbara Cubin (R)	Bush/ Cheney (R) ✓
2001	Jim Geringer (R)	Joseph Meyer (R)	Max Maxfield (R)	Cynthia Lummis (R)	Judy Catchpole (R)	20R, 10D	46R, 14D	Craig L. Thomas (R)	Mike Enzi (R)	Barbara Cubin (R)	Bush/ Cheney (R) ✓
2002	Jim Geringer (R)	Joseph Meyer (R)	Max Maxfield (R)	Cynthia Lummis (R)	Judy Catchpole (R)	20R, 10D	46R, 14D	Craig L. Thomas (R)	Mike Enzi (R)	Barbara Cubin (R)	Bush/ Cheney (R) ✓
2003	Dave Freudenthal (D)	Joseph Meyer (R)	Max Maxfield (R)	Cynthia Lummis (R)	Trent Blankenship (R)	20R, 10D	45R, 15D	Craig L. Thomas (R)	Mike Enzi (R)	Barbara Cubin (R)	Bush/ Cheney (R) ✓
2004	Dave Freudenthal (D)	Joseph Meyer (R)	Max Maxfield (R)	Cynthia Lummis (R)	Trent Blankenship (R)	20R, 10D	45R, 15D	Craig L. Thomas (R)	Mike Enzi (R)	Barbara Cubin (R)	Bush/ Cheney (R) ✓
2005	Dave Freudenthal (D)	Joseph Meyer (R)	Max Maxfield (R)	Cynthia Lummis (R)	Trent Blankenship (R)	23R, 7D	46R, 14D	Craig L. Thomas (R)	Mike Enzi (R)	Barbara Cubin (R)	Bush/ Cheney (R) ✓
2006	Dave Freudenthal (D)	Joseph Meyer (R)	Max Maxfield (R)	Cynthia Lummis (R)	Trent Blankenship (R)	23R, 7D	46R, 14D	Craig L. Thomas (R)	Mike Enzi (R)	Barbara Cubin (R)	Bush/ Cheney (R) ✓
2007	Dave Freudenthal (D)	Max Maxfield (R)	Rita Meyer (R)	Joseph Meyer (R)	Jim McBride (R)	23R, 7D	43R, 17D	Craig L. Thomas (R)	Mike Enzi (R)	Barbara Cubin (R)	Bush/ Cheney (R) ✓
2007	Dave Freudenthal (D)	Max Maxfield (R)	Rita Meyer (R)	Joseph Meyer (R)	Jim McBride (R)	23R, 7D	43R, 17D	John Barrasso (R)	Mike Enzi (R)	Barbara Cubin (R)	Bush/ Cheney (R) ✓
2008	Dave Freudenthal (D)	Max Maxfield (R)	Rita Meyer (R)	Joseph Meyer (R)	Jim McBride (R)	23R, 7D	43R, 17D	John Barrasso (R)	Mike Enzi (R)	Barbara Cubin (R)	McCain/ Palin (R) ✗
2009	Dave Freudenthal (D)	Max Maxfield (R)	Rita Meyer (R)	Joseph Meyer (R)	Jim McBride (R)	23R, 7D	41R, 19D	John Barrasso (R)	Mike Enzi (R)	Cynthia Lummis (R)	McCain/ Palin (R) ✗
2010	Dave Freudenthal (D)	Max Maxfield (R)	Rita Meyer (R)	Joseph Meyer (R)	Jim McBride (R)	23R, 7D	41R, 19D	John Barrasso (R)	Mike Enzi (R)	Cynthia Lummis (R)	McCain/ Palin (R) ✗
2011	Matt Mead (R)	Max Maxfield (R)	Cynthia Cloud (R)	Joseph Meyer (R)	Cindy Hill (R)	26R, 4D	50R, 10D	John Barrasso (R)	Mike Enzi (R)	Cynthia Lummis (R)	McCain/ Palin (R) ✗
2012	Matt Mead (R)	Max Maxfield (R)	Cynthia Cloud (R)	Joseph Meyer (R)	Cindy Hill (R)	26R, 4D	50R, 10D	John Barrasso (R)	Mike Enzi (R)	Cynthia Lummis (R)	Romney/ Ryan (R) ✗
2013	Matt Mead (R)	Max Maxfield (R)	Cynthia Cloud (R)	Mark Gordon (R)	Cindy Hill (R)	26R, 4D	52R, 8D	John Barrasso (R)	Mike Enzi (R)	Cynthia Lummis (R)	Romney/ Ryan (R) ✗
2014	Matt Mead (R)	Max Maxfield (R)	Cynthia Cloud (R)	Mark Gordon (R)	Cindy Hill (R)	26R, 4D	52R, 8D	John Barrasso (R)	Mike Enzi (R)	Cynthia Lummis (R)	Romney/ Ryan (R) ✗
2015	Matt Mead (R)	Ed Murray (R)	Cynthia Cloud (R)	Mark Gordon (R)	Jillian Balow (R)	26R, 4D	51R, 9D	John Barrasso (R)	Mike Enzi (R)	Cynthia Lummis (R)	Romney/ Ryan (R) ✗
2016	Matt Mead (R)	Ed Murray (R)	Cynthia Cloud (R)	Mark Gordon (R)	Jillian Balow (R)	26R, 4D	51R, 9D	John Barrasso (R)	Mike Enzi (R)	Cynthia Lummis (R)	Trump/ Pence (R) ✓
2017	Matt Mead (R)	Ed Murray (R)	Cynthia Cloud (R)	Mark Gordon (R)	Jillian Balow (R)	27R, 3D	51R, 9D	John Barrasso (R)	Mike Enzi (R)	Liz Cheney (R)	Trump/ Pence (R) ✓
2018	Matt Mead (R)	Edward; Buchanan (R) (Note: Karen Wheeler (R) served as Acting Secretary of State from February 9–March 1, 2018 between Murray's resignation and Buchanan's appointment.)	Cynthia Cloud (R)	Mark Gordon (R)	Jillian Balow (R)	27R, 3D	51R, 9D	John Barrasso (R)	Mike Enzi (R)	Liz Cheney (R)	Trump/ Pence (R) ✓
2019	Mark Gordon (R)	Edward; Buchanan (R)	Kristi Racines (R)	Curt Meier (R)	Jillian Balow (R)	27R, 3D	50R, 9D, 1I	John Barrasso (R)	Mike Enzi (R)	Liz Cheney (R)	Trump/ Pence (R) ✓
2020	Mark Gordon (R)	Edward; Buchanan (R)	Kristi Racines (R)	Curt Meier (R)	Jillian Balow (R)	27R, 3D	50R, 9D, 1I	John Barrasso (R)	Mike Enzi (R)	Liz Cheney (R)	Trump/ Pence (R) ✗
2021	Mark Gordon (R)	Edward; Buchanan (R)	Kristi Racines (R)	Curt Meier (R)	Jillian Balow (R)	28R, 2D	51R, 7D, 1L, 1I	John Barrasso (R)	Cynthia Lummis (R)	Liz Cheney (R)	Trump/ Pence (R) ✗
2022	Mark Gordon (R)	Edward; Buchanan (R)	Kristi Racines (R)	Curt Meier (R)	Jillian Balow (R)	28R, 2D	51R, 7D, 1L, 1I	John Barrasso (R)	Cynthia Lummis (R)	Liz Cheney (R)	Trump/ Pence (R) ✗
2023	Mark Gordon (R)	Chuck Gray (R)	Kristi Racines (R)	Curt Meier (R)	Megan Degenfelder (R)	29R, 2D	57R, 5D	John Barrasso (R)	Cynthia Lummis (R)	Harriet Hageman (R)	Trump/ Pence (R) ✗
2024	Mark Gordon (R)	Chuck Gray (R)	Kristi Racines (R)	Curt Meier (R)	Megan Degenfelder (R)	29R, 2D	57R, 5D	John Barrasso (R)	Cynthia Lummis (R)	Harriet Hageman (R)	Trump/ Vance (R) ✓
2025	Mark Gordon (R)	Chuck Gray (R)	Kristi Racines (R)	Curt Meier (R)	Megan Degenfelder (R)	29R, 2D	56R, 6D	John Barrasso (R)	Cynthia Lummis (R)	Harriet Hageman (R)	Trump/ Vance (R) ✓
2026	Mark Gordon (R)	Chuck Gray (R)	Kristi Racines (R)	Curt Meier (R)	Megan Degenfelder (R)	29R, 2D	56R, 6D	John Barrasso (R)	Cynthia Lummis (R)	Harriet Hageman (R)	Trump/ Vance (R) ✓
2027	Eric Barlow (R)	Robert Short (R)	Kristi Racines (R)	Curt Meier (R)	Steve Harshman (R)	29R, 2D	55R, 7D	John Barrasso (R)	Harriet Hageman (R)	Chuck Gray (R)	Trump/ Vance (R) ✓

Key to party colors and abbreviations for members of the U.S. Congress and other politicians or officials
Alaskan Independence (AKIP) Know Nothing (KN) American Labor (AL) Anti-Jacksonian (Anti-J); National Republican (NR) Anti-Administration (AA) Anti-Masonic (Anti-M) Conservative (Con) Covenant (Cov)	Democratic (D) Democratic–Farmer–Labor (DFL) Democratic–NPL (D-NPL) Dixiecrat (Dix), States' Rights (SR) Democratic-Republican (DR) Farmer–Labor (FL) Federalist (F); Pro-Administration (PA)	Free Soil (FS) Fusion (Fus) Greenback (GB) Independence (IPM) Jacksonian (J) Liberal (Lib) Libertarian (L) National Union (NU)	Nonpartisan League (NPL) Nullifier (N) Opposition Northern (O); Opposition Southern (O) Populist (Pop) Progressive (Prog) Prohibition (Proh) Readjuster (Rea)	Republican (R) Silver (Sv) Silver Republican (SvR) Socialist (Soc) Union (U) Unconditional Union (UU) Vermont Progressive (VP) Whig (W)	Independent (I) Nonpartisan (NP)

== See also ==
- Politics in Wyoming
