= List of United States representatives from Wyoming =

The following is an alphabetical list of United States representatives from the state of Wyoming. For chronological tables of members of both houses of the United States Congress from the state (through the present day), see Wyoming's congressional delegations. The list of names should be complete (as of January 3, 2025), but other data may be incomplete. It includes members who have represented both the state and the territory, both past and present.

== Current member ==
Updated January 3, 2025.

- Wyoming's at-large district: Harriet Hageman (R) (since 2023)

== List of members and delegates ==
Member / Delegate	Party	District	Years	Electoral history
Frank A. Barrett	Republican	At-large	January 3, 1943 – December 31, 1950	Elected in 1942; Resigned when elected Governor of Wyoming
Joseph M. Carey	Republican	Territory	March 4, 1885 – July 10, 1890	Elected in 1884; Retired when elected U.S. senator
Vincent M. Carter	Republican	At-large	March 4, 1929 – January 3, 1935	Elected in 1928; Retired to run for U.S. senator
Dick Cheney	Republican	At-large	January 3, 1979 – March 20, 1989	Elected in 1978; Resigned when appointed Secretary of Defense
Liz Cheney	Republican	At-large	January 3, 2017 – January 3, 2023	Elected in 2016; Lost renomination to Hageman
Clarence D. Clark	Republican	At-large	December 1, 1890 – March 3, 1893	Elected in 1890; Lost re-election to Coffeen
Henry A. Coffeen	Democratic	At-large	March 4, 1893 – March 3, 1895	Elected in 1892; Lost re-election to Mondell
William Wellington Corlett	Republican	Territory	March 4, 1877 – March 3, 1879	Elected in 1876; Did not seek re-election
Barbara Cubin	Republican	At-large	January 3, 1995 – January 3, 2009	Elected in 1994; Retired
Stephen Wheeler Downey	Republican	Territory	March 4, 1879 – March 3, 1881	Elected in 1878; Retired
Paul R. Greever	Democratic	At-large	January 3, 1935 – January 3, 1939	Elected in 1934; Lost re-election to Horton
Harriet Hageman	Republican	At-large	January 3, 2023 – present	Elected in 2022
Bill Harrison	Republican	At-large	January 3, 1951 – January 3, 1955	Elected in 1950; Retired to run for U.S. senator
Bill Harrison	Republican	At-large	January 3, 1961 – January 3, 1965	Elected in 1960; Lost re-election to Roncalio
Bill Harrison	Republican	At-large	January 3, 1967 – January 3, 1969	Elected in 1966; Lost primary to Wold
Frank O. Horton	Republican	At-large	January 3, 1939 – January 3, 1941	Elected in 1938; Lost re-election to McIntyre
William Theopilus Jones	Republican	Territory	March 4, 1871 – March 3, 1873	Elected in 1870; Lost re-election to Steele
Cynthia Lummis	Republican	At-large	January 3, 2009 – January 3, 2017	Elected in 2008; Retired
John J. McIntyre	Democratic	At-large	January 3, 1941 – January 3, 1943	Elected in 1940; Lost re-election to Barrett
Frank W. Mondell	Republican	At-large	March 4, 1895 – March 3, 1897	Elected in 1894; Lost re-election to Osborne
Frank W. Mondell	Republican	At-large	March 4, 1899 – March 3, 1923	Elected in 1898; Retired to run for U.S. senator
Stephen Friel Nuckolls	Democratic	Territory	December 6, 1869 – March 3, 1871	Elected in 1869; Retired
John E. Osborne	Democratic	At-large	March 4, 1897 – March 3, 1899	Elected in 1896; Retired
Morton Everel Post	Democratic	Territory	March 4, 1881 – March 3, 1885	Elected in 1880; Did not seek re-election
Teno Roncalio	Democratic	At-large	January 3, 1965 – January 3, 1967	Elected in 1964; Retired to run for U.S. senator
Teno Roncalio	Democratic	At-large	January 3, 1971 – December 30, 1978	Elected in 1970; Did not seek re-election and resigned early
William Randolph Steele	Democratic	Territory	March 4, 1873 – March 3, 1877	Elected in 1872; Lost re-election to Corlett
Craig L. Thomas	Republican	At-large	April 26, 1989 – January 3, 1995	Elected in 1989 special election Retired to run for U.S. senator
Edwin K. Thomson	Republican	At-large	January 3, 1955 – December 9, 1960	Elected in 1954; Retired to run for U.S. senator but died before Senate term began
Charles E. Winter	Republican	At-large	March 4, 1923 – March 3, 1929	Elected in 1922; Retired to run for U.S. senator
John S. Wold	Republican	At-large	January 3, 1969 – January 3, 1971	Elected in 1968; Retired to run for U.S. senator

== See also ==
- List of United States senators from Wyoming
- Wyoming's at-large congressional district
- Wyoming's congressional delegations
