= Wyoming's congressional delegations =

Map showing the location of Wyoming within the United States.

Wyoming has sent congressional delegations to the United States Senate and United States House of Representatives since it became a state in 1890. Before becoming a state, the Wyoming Territory elected a non-voting delegate at-large to Congress, beginning with the 41st United States Congress in 1869. Wyoming first sent a voting representative to Congress in the 51st United States Congress, following its statehood.

Each U.S. state elects two senators to serve for six years in general elections, with their re-election staggered. Prior to the ratification of the Seventeenth Amendment in 1913, Wyoming senators were elected by the Wyoming State Legislature; afterwards, senators were elected directly by the people of the state. Currently, Wyoming is represented in the Senate by John Barrasso and Cynthia Lummis.

Each state elects at least one member to the House of Representatives for a two-year term. The number of House members is proportional to the state's share of the national population, and changes every ten years with the results of the United States census. Wyoming has had one representative in the House since its statehood. Currently, Wyoming is represented in the House by Harriet Hageman.

Wyoming's congressional delegations have been exclusively composed of Republicans since the 96th United States Congress in 1979. The last Democrat to represent Wyoming in Congress was Teno Roncalio, who resigned in 1978 when he retired from the House of Representatives.

== Current delegation ==
Current U.S. senators from Wyoming
Wyoming CPVI (2025): R+23	Class I senator	Class II senator
Wyoming CPVI (2025): R+23	John Barrasso (Senior senator) (Casper)	Cynthia Lummis (Junior senator) (Cheyenne)
Party	Republican	Republican
Incumbent since	June 25, 2007	January 3, 2021

Wyoming's current congressional delegation in the 119th United States Congress consists of two senators, John Barrasso and Cynthia Lummis, and one representative, Harriet Hageman, all of whom are Republicans. The state has had two senators and one voting representative in the House of Representatives since its statehood in 1890.

The Cook Partisan Voting Index (CPVI) is a measure of how strongly partisan a state is. For each district or state, the CPVI measures the party leaning (Democratic or Republican) and the number of percentage points more partisan than the national average. For instance, a rating of R+4 would mean the district or state voted four percentage points more Republican than the national average, while a rating of D+9 would mean the district or state voted nine points more Democratic than the national average. As of 2025, the CPVI rated Wyoming as leaning Republican at R+23.

Current U.S. representative from Wyoming
District	Member (Residence)	Party	Incumbent since	CPVI (2025)	District map
At-large	Harriet Hageman (Cheyenne)	Republican	January 3, 2023	R+23	Map of the state of Wyoming

== United States Senate ==
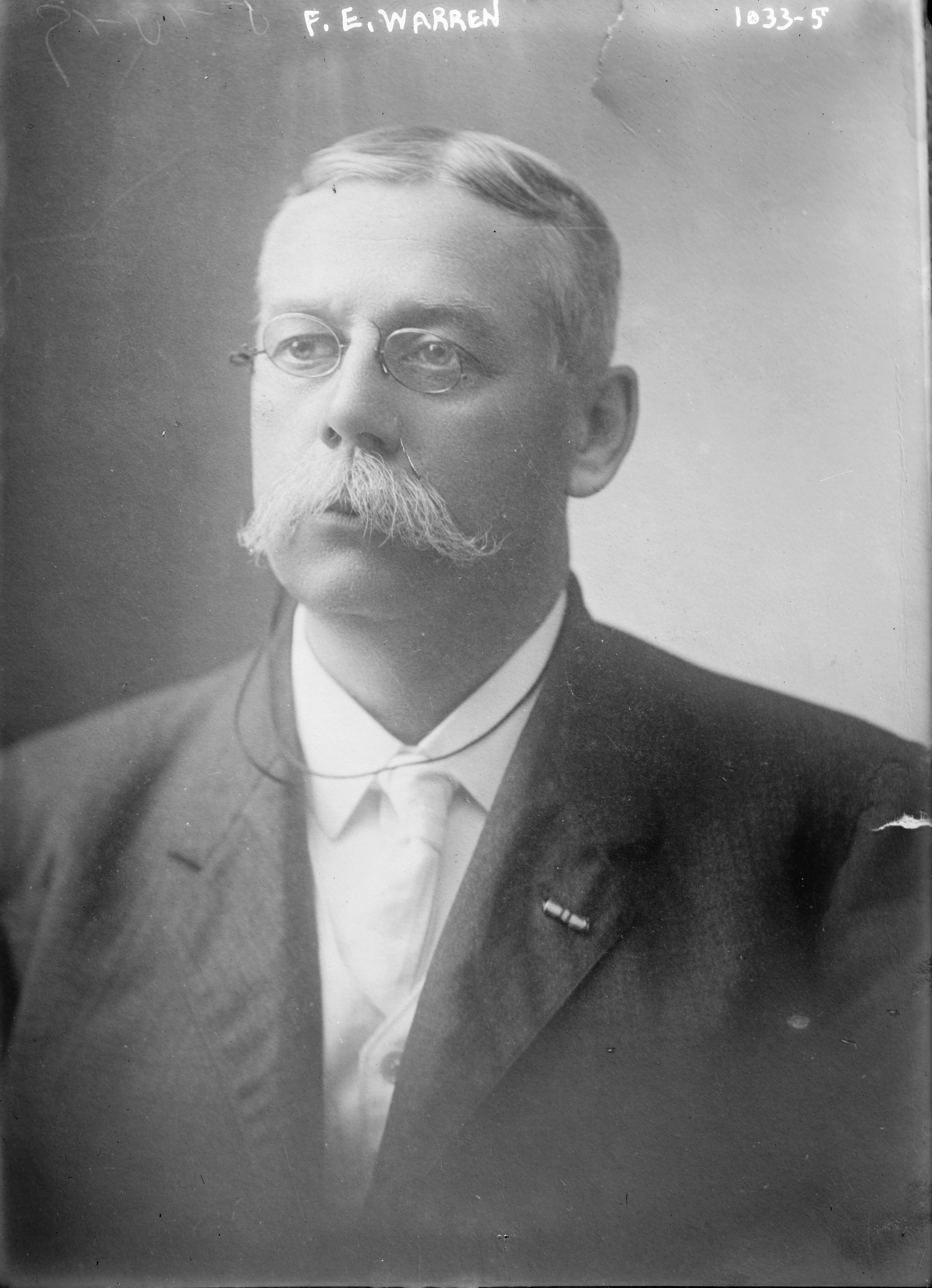
Francis E. Warren, one of Wyoming's first two senators, chaired the Senate Appropriations Committee for twelve years while he served in the Senate, and was its oldest active member upon his death in office.

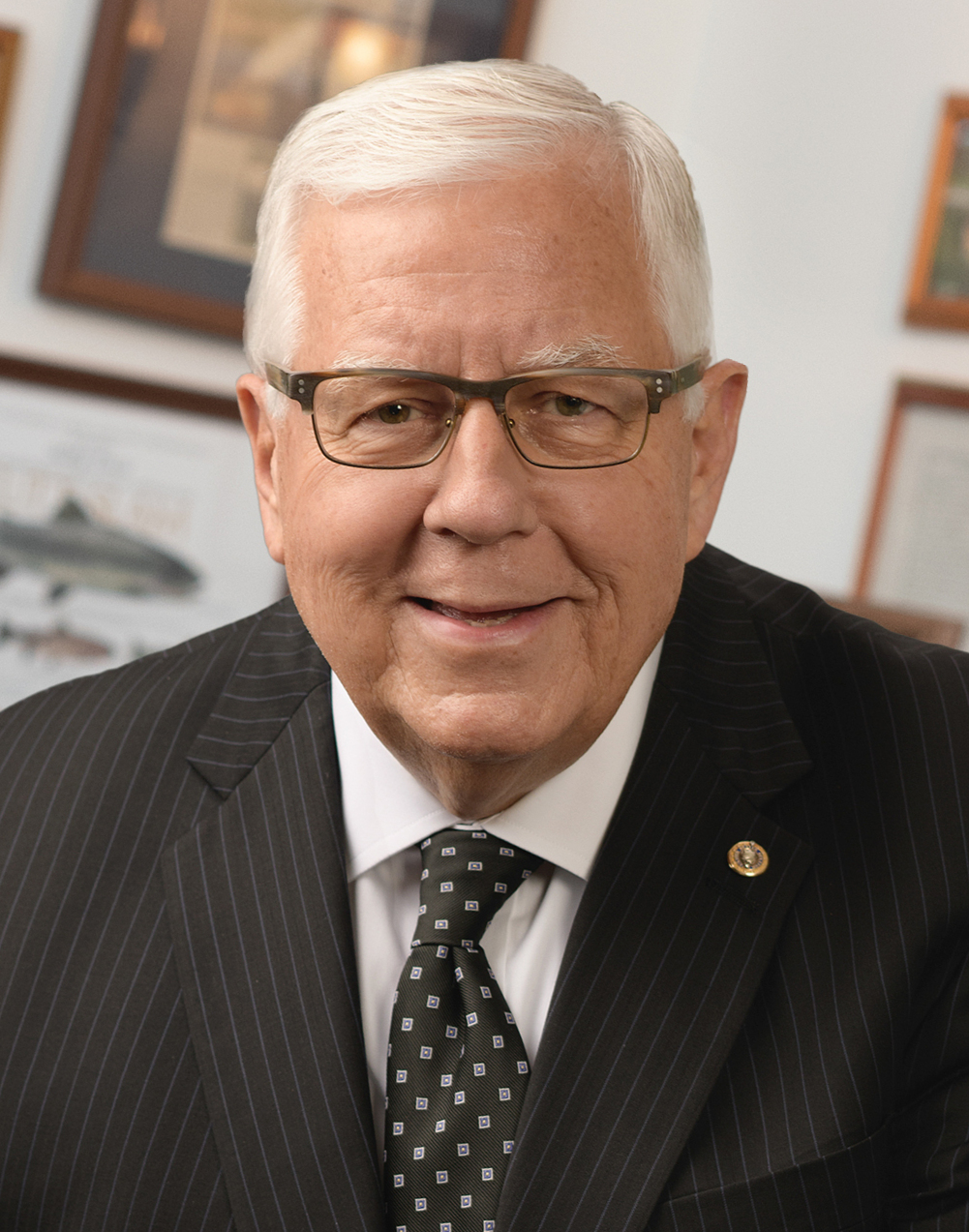
Mike Enzi, a Wyoming senator who chaired both the Health, Education, Labor and Pensions and Budget committees, also was one of the lead sponsors of the Freedom to Travel to Cuba Act.

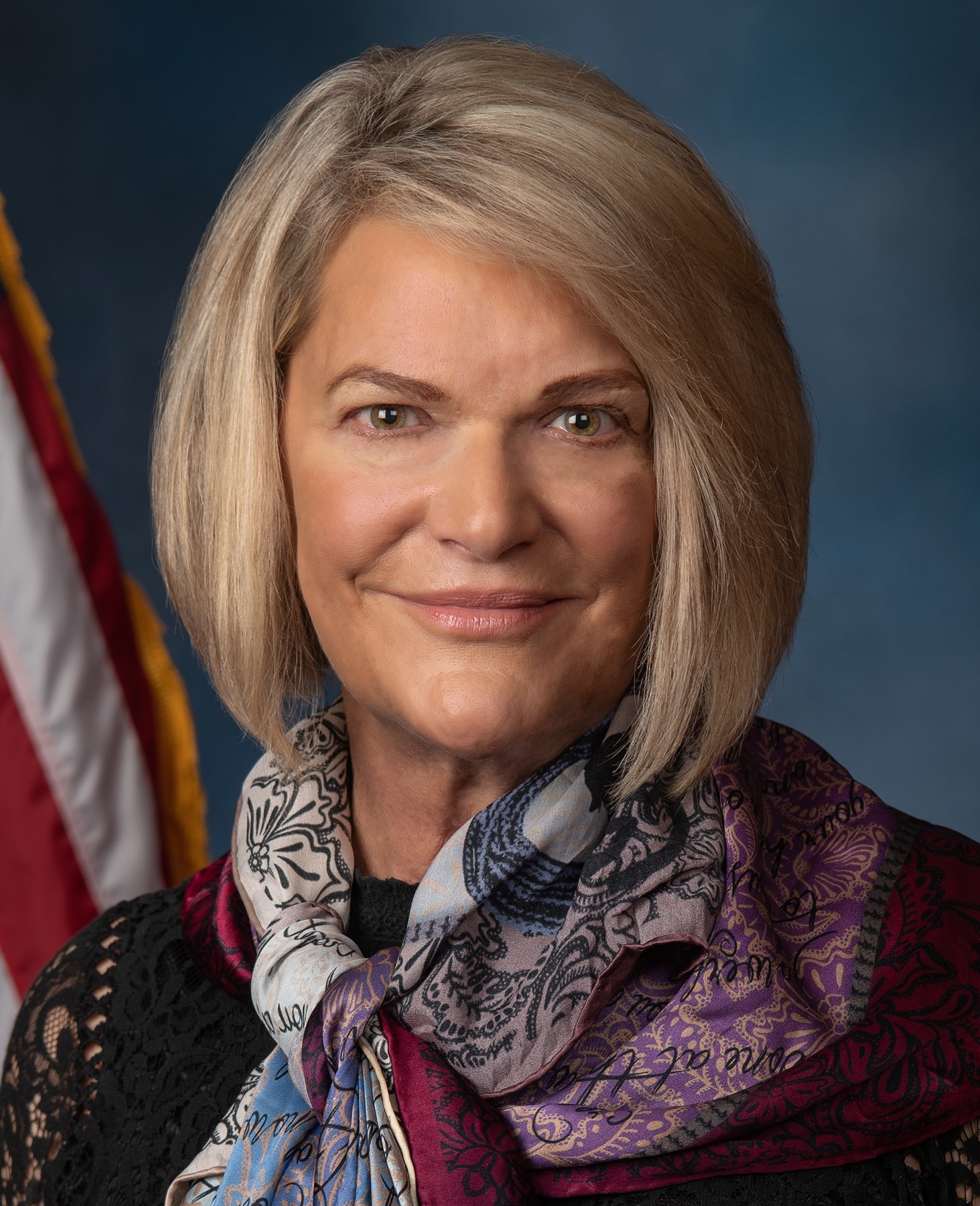
Cynthia Lummis is the first woman to represent Wyoming in the Senate.

Twenty-two people have represented Wyoming in the United States Senate, including sixteen Republicans and six Democrats. Cynthia Lummis, a sitting member, is the first woman to represent Wyoming in the Senate. Several senators from Wyoming have risen to leadership roles; for instance, both Alan Simpson and sitting senator John Barrasso have served as Senate Republican Whip, Mike Enzi chaired both the Health, Education, Labor and Pensions and Budget committees while serving in the Senate, and Francis E. Warren chaired the Senate Appropriations Committee during his tenure.

Senators are elected every six years depending on their class, with each senator serving a six-year term and elections for senators occurring every two years; the class up for re-election rotates such that each election, around one-third of the seats in the Senate are up for election. Wyoming's senators are elected in classes I and II. Currently, Wyoming is represented in the Senate by John Barrasso and Cynthia Lummis, both of whom are Republicans.

Democratic (D)
Republican (R)

Senators from Wyoming
Class I senator	Congress	Class II senator
Francis E. Warren (R)	51st (1889–1891)	Joseph M. Carey (R)
Francis E. Warren (R)	52nd (1891–1893)	Joseph M. Carey (R)
vacant (Note: The Wyoming Legislature was unable to elect a senator for the 53rd United States Congress, so Governor John Eugene Osborne appointed Asahel Beckwith to the seat. However, Beckwith never was seated in the Senate, and Clarence D. Clark was elected in 1895 to fill the seat instead.)	53rd (1893–1895)	Joseph M. Carey (R)
Clarence D. Clark (R)	53rd (1893–1895)	Joseph M. Carey (R)
Clarence D. Clark (R)	54th (1895–1897)	Francis E. Warren (R) (Note: Senator Warren died on November 24, 1929, while in office.)
Clarence D. Clark (R)	55th (1897–1899)	Francis E. Warren (R)
Clarence D. Clark (R)	56th (1899–1901)	Francis E. Warren (R)
Clarence D. Clark (R)	57th (1901–1903)	Francis E. Warren (R)
Clarence D. Clark (R)	58th (1903–1905)	Francis E. Warren (R)
Clarence D. Clark (R)	59th (1905–1907)	Francis E. Warren (R)
Clarence D. Clark (R)	60th (1907–1909)	Francis E. Warren (R)
Clarence D. Clark (R)	61st (1909–1911)	Francis E. Warren (R)
Clarence D. Clark (R)	62nd (1911–1913)	Francis E. Warren (R)
Clarence D. Clark (R)	63rd (1913–1915)	Francis E. Warren (R)
Clarence D. Clark (R)	64th (1915–1917)	Francis E. Warren (R)
John B. Kendrick (D) (Note: Senator Kendrick died on November 3, 1933, while in office.)	65th (1917–1919)	Francis E. Warren (R)
John B. Kendrick (D)	66th (1919–1921)	Francis E. Warren (R)
John B. Kendrick (D)	67th (1921–1923)	Francis E. Warren (R)
John B. Kendrick (D)	68th (1923–1925)	Francis E. Warren (R)
John B. Kendrick (D)	69th (1925–1927)	Francis E. Warren (R)
John B. Kendrick (D)	70th (1927–1929)	Francis E. Warren (R)
John B. Kendrick (D)	71st (1929–1931)	Francis E. Warren (R)
John B. Kendrick (D)	71st (1929–1931)	Patrick Joseph Sullivan (R) (Note: Senator Sullivan served from December 5, 1929, when his predecessor, Francis E. Warren, died, to November 20, 1930, when his successor, Robert D. Carey, was elected.)
John B. Kendrick (D)	71st (1929–1931)	Robert D. Carey (R)
John B. Kendrick (D)	72nd (1931–1933)	Robert D. Carey (R)
John B. Kendrick (D)	73rd (1933–1935)	Robert D. Carey (R)
Joseph C. O'Mahoney (D)	73rd (1933–1935)	Robert D. Carey (R)
Joseph C. O'Mahoney (D)	74th (1935–1937)	Robert D. Carey (R)
Joseph C. O'Mahoney (D)	75th (1937–1939)	Harry Schwartz (D)
Joseph C. O'Mahoney (D)	76th (1939–1941)	Harry Schwartz (D)
Joseph C. O'Mahoney (D)	77th (1941–1943)	Harry Schwartz (D)
Joseph C. O'Mahoney (D)	78th (1943–1945)	Edward V. Robertson (R)
Joseph C. O'Mahoney (D)	79th (1945–1947)	Edward V. Robertson (R)
Joseph C. O'Mahoney (D)	80th (1947–1949)	Edward V. Robertson (R)
Joseph C. O'Mahoney (D)	81st (1949–1951)	Lester C. Hunt (D) (Note: Senator Hunt died on June 19, 1954, while in office.)
Joseph C. O'Mahoney (D)	82nd (1951–1953)	Lester C. Hunt (D)
Frank A. Barrett (R)	83rd (1953–1955)	Lester C. Hunt (D)
Frank A. Barrett (R)	83rd (1953–1955)	Edward D. Crippa (R) (Note: Senator Crippa served from June 1954, when his predecessor, Lester C. Hunt, died, to November 1954, when his successor, Joseph C. O'Mahoney, was elected.)
Frank A. Barrett (R)	83rd (1953–1955)	Joseph C. O'Mahoney (D)
Frank A. Barrett (R)	84th (1955–1957)	Joseph C. O'Mahoney (D)
Frank A. Barrett (R)	85th (1957–1959)	Joseph C. O'Mahoney (D)
Gale W. McGee (D)	86th (1959–1961)	Joseph C. O'Mahoney (D)
Gale W. McGee (D)	87th (1961–1963)	Joe Hickey (D) (Note: Keith Thomson was elected to succeed the retiring Senator O'Mahoney, but died on December 9, 1960, before taking office. Hickey, who was governor at the time, resigned, and was appointed to the Senate seat by his successor as governor, John Gage. Hickey served until November 6, 1962, after he lost the 1962 United States Senate special election in Wyoming to his successor, Milward Simpson.)
Gale W. McGee (D)	87th (1961–1963)	Milward Simpson (R)
Gale W. McGee (D)	88th (1963–1965)	Milward Simpson (R)
Gale W. McGee (D)	89th (1965–1967)	Milward Simpson (R)
Gale W. McGee (D)	90th (1967–1969)	Clifford Hansen (R) (Note: Senator Hansen resigned from the Senate on December 31, 1978.)
Gale W. McGee (D)	91st (1969–1971)	Clifford Hansen (R)
Gale W. McGee (D)	92nd (1971–1973)	Clifford Hansen (R)
Gale W. McGee (D)	93rd (1973–1975)	Clifford Hansen (R)
Gale W. McGee (D)	94th (1975–1977)	Clifford Hansen (R)
Malcolm Wallop (R)	95th (1977–1979)	Clifford Hansen (R)
Malcolm Wallop (R)	95th (1977–1979)	Alan Simpson (R)
Malcolm Wallop (R)	96th (1979–1981)	Alan Simpson (R)
Malcolm Wallop (R)	97th (1981–1983)	Alan Simpson (R)
Malcolm Wallop (R)	98th (1983–1985)	Alan Simpson (R)
Malcolm Wallop (R)	99th (1985–1987)	Alan Simpson (R)
Malcolm Wallop (R)	100th (1987–1989)	Alan Simpson (R)
Malcolm Wallop (R)	101st (1989–1991)	Alan Simpson (R)
Malcolm Wallop (R)	102nd (1991–1993)	Alan Simpson (R)
Malcolm Wallop (R)	103rd (1993–1995)	Alan Simpson (R)
Craig L. Thomas (R) (Note: Senator Thomas died June 4, 2007, while in office.)	104th (1995–1997)	Alan Simpson (R)
Craig L. Thomas (R)	105th (1997–1999)	Mike Enzi (R)
Craig L. Thomas (R)	106th (1999–2001)	Mike Enzi (R)
Craig L. Thomas (R)	107th (2001–2003)	Mike Enzi (R)
Craig L. Thomas (R)	108th (2003–2005)	Mike Enzi (R)
Craig L. Thomas (R)	109th (2005–2007)	Mike Enzi (R)
Craig L. Thomas (R)	110th (2007–2009)	Mike Enzi (R)
John Barrasso (R)	110th (2007–2009)	Mike Enzi (R)
John Barrasso (R)	111th (2009–2011)	Mike Enzi (R)
John Barrasso (R)	112th (2011–2013)	Mike Enzi (R)
John Barrasso (R)	113th (2013–2015)	Mike Enzi (R)
John Barrasso (R)	114th (2015–2017)	Mike Enzi (R)
John Barrasso (R)	115th (2017–2019)	Mike Enzi (R)
John Barrasso (R)	116th (2019–2021)	Mike Enzi (R)
John Barrasso (R)	117th (2021–2023)	Cynthia Lummis (R)
John Barrasso (R)	118th (2023–2025)	Cynthia Lummis (R)
John Barrasso (R)	119th (2025–2027)	Cynthia Lummis (R)
John Barrasso (R)	120th (2027–2029)	Harriet Hageman (R)

== United States House of Representatives ==
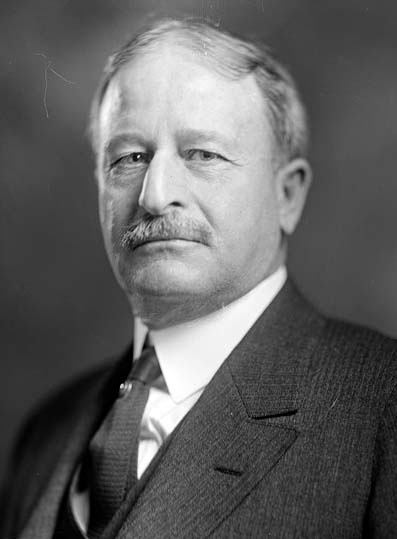
Frank W. Mondell, a representative from Wyoming, served as the House Majority Leader in the 66th and 67th United States Congress.

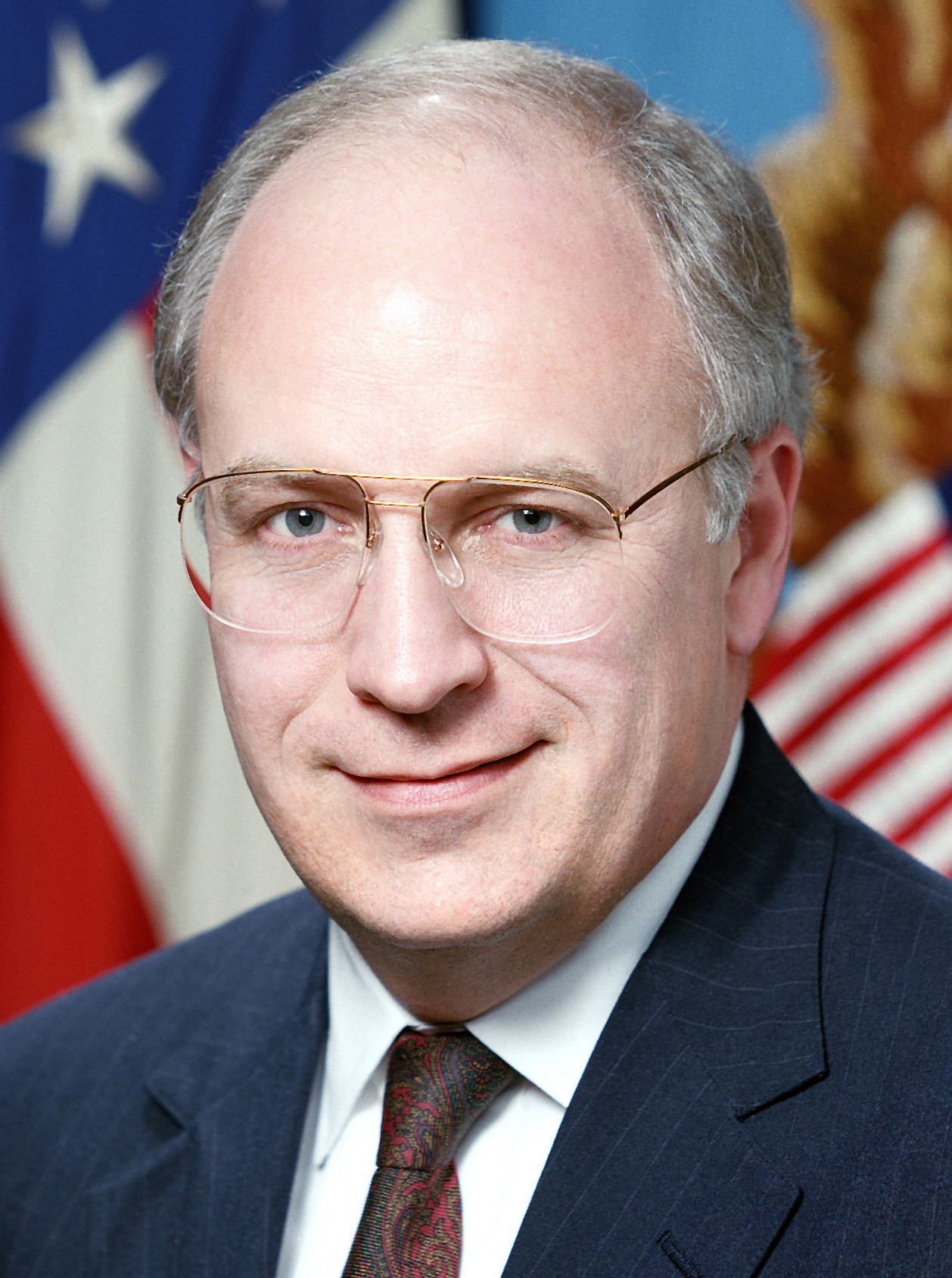
Dick Cheney, a representative from Wyoming, eventually served as the Secretary of Defense and as Vice President of the United States.

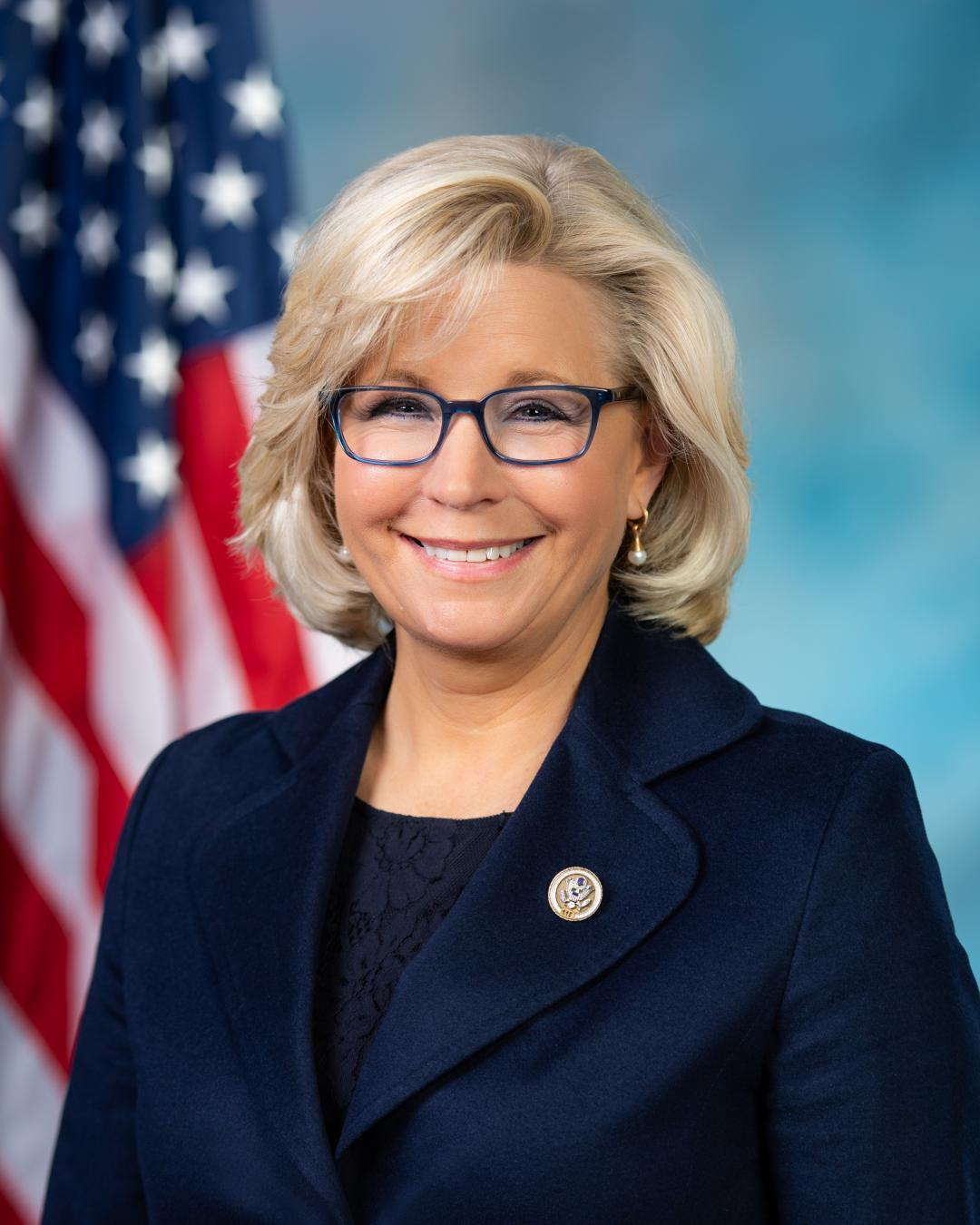
Liz Cheney, one of four women who have represented Wyoming in the House, chaired the House Republican Conference and served as vice chair on the January 6th Committee.

Twenty-seven people have represented Wyoming in the House of Representatives, including nineteen Republicans and eight Democrats. Of those, seven represented Wyoming as a non-voting delegate prior to Wyoming's statehood in 1890. The most recent four, Barbara Cubin, Cynthia Lummis, Liz Cheney, and Harriet Hageman, have all been women; they are also the only representatives from Wyoming to have been women.

Many representatives from Wyoming have held important roles in the House. For instance, Frank W. Mondell was the House Majority Leader for the 66th and 67th United States Congress; additionally, Liz Cheney chaired the House Republican Conference and served as vice chair on the January 6th Committee. Others have gone on to serve in other political offices; for example, Dick Cheney resigned from the House to become the Secretary of Defense in the George H. W. Bush administration, and later became Vice President of the United States in the George W. Bush administration.

Each district uses a popular vote to elect a member of its delegation in the House of Representatives. Districts are redrawn every ten years, after data from the US Census is collected. Wyoming has had one district representing the entire state since its statehood. Currently, Wyoming is represented by Harriet Hageman in the House.

=== Historical timeline ===
Democratic (D)
Republican (R)

==== 1869–1890: 1 non-voting delegate ====
The Wyoming Territory was created on July 25, 1868. Beginning with the 41st United States Congress, it sent a non-voting delegate to the House.

Delegates to the House of Representatives from Wyoming Territory from 1869 to 1891
Congress	Delegate
41st (1869–1871)	Stephen Friel Nuckolls (D)
42nd (1871–1873)	William Theopilus Jones (R)
43rd (1873–1875)	William Randolph Steele (D)
44th (1875–1877)	William Randolph Steele (D)
45th (1877–1879)	William Wellington Corlett (R)
46th (1879–1881)	Stephen Wheeler Downey (R)
47th (1881–1883)	Morton Everel Post (D)
48th (1883–1885)	Morton Everel Post (D)
49th (1885–1887)	Joseph M. Carey (R)
50th (1887–1889)	Joseph M. Carey (R)
51st (1889–1891)	Joseph M. Carey (R)

==== 1890–present: 1 seat ====
Since its statehood in 1890, Wyoming has been apportioned one seat in the House.

Members of the House of Representatives from the State of Wyoming from 1890 to present
Congress	At-large
51st (1889–1891)	Clarence D. Clark (R)
52nd (1891–1893)	Clarence D. Clark (R)
53rd (1893–1895)	Henry A. Coffeen (D)
54th (1895–1897)	Frank W. Mondell (R)
55th (1897–1899)	John Eugene Osborne (D)
56th (1899–1901)	Frank W. Mondell (R)
57th (1901–1903)	Frank W. Mondell (R)
58th (1903–1905)	Frank W. Mondell (R)
59th (1905–1907)	Frank W. Mondell (R)
60th (1907–1909)	Frank W. Mondell (R)
61st (1909–1911)	Frank W. Mondell (R)
62nd (1911–1913)	Frank W. Mondell (R)
63rd (1913–1915)	Frank W. Mondell (R)
64th (1915–1917)	Frank W. Mondell (R)
65th (1917–1919)	Frank W. Mondell (R)
66th (1919–1921)	Frank W. Mondell (R)
67th (1921–1923)	Frank W. Mondell (R)
68th (1923–1925)	Charles E. Winter (R)
69th (1925–1927)	Charles E. Winter (R)
70th (1927–1929)	Charles E. Winter (R)
71st (1929–1931)	Vincent Carter (R)
72nd (1931–1933)	Vincent Carter (R)
73rd (1933–1935)	Vincent Carter (R)
74th (1935–1937)	Paul R. Greever (D)
75th (1937–1939)	Paul R. Greever (D)
76th (1939–1941)	Frank O. Horton (R)
77th (1941–1943)	John J. McIntyre (D)
78th (1943–1945)	Frank A. Barrett (R)
79th (1945–1947)	Frank A. Barrett (R)
80th (1947–1949)	Frank A. Barrett (R)
81st (1949–1951)	Frank A. Barrett (R)
82nd (1951–1953)	William Henry Harrison III (R)
83rd (1953–1955)	William Henry Harrison III (R)
84th (1955–1957)	Keith Thomson (R)
85th (1957–1959)	Keith Thomson (R)
86th (1959–1961)	Keith Thomson (R)
87th (1961–1963)	William Henry Harrison III (R)
88th (1963–1965)	William Henry Harrison III (R)
89th (1965–1967)	Teno Roncalio (D)
90th (1967–1969)	William Henry Harrison III (R)
91st (1969–1971)	John S. Wold (R)
92nd (1971–1973)	Teno Roncalio (D) (Note: Representative Roncalio resigned on December 30, 1978, as he retired from politics.)
93rd (1973–1975)	Teno Roncalio (D)
94th (1975–1977)	Teno Roncalio (D)
95th (1977–1979)	Teno Roncalio (D)
95th (1977–1979)	vacant (Note: The House seat was not filled after Representative Teno Roncalio's resignation until the 96th United States Congress.)
96th (1979–1981)	Dick Cheney (R) (Note: Representative Cheney resigned on March 17, 1989, to become the Secretary of Defense in the George H. W. Bush administration.)
97th (1981–1983)	Dick Cheney (R)
98th (1983–1985)	Dick Cheney (R)
99th (1985–1987)	Dick Cheney (R)
100th (1987–1989)	Dick Cheney (R)
101st (1989–1991)	Dick Cheney (R)
101st (1989–1991)	Craig L. Thomas (R)
102nd (1991–1993)	Craig L. Thomas (R)
103rd (1993–1995)	Craig L. Thomas (R)
104th (1995–1997)	Barbara Cubin (R)
105th (1997–1999)	Barbara Cubin (R)
106th (1999–2001)	Barbara Cubin (R)
107th (2001–2003)	Barbara Cubin (R)
108th (2003–2005)	Barbara Cubin (R)
109th (2005–2007)	Barbara Cubin (R)
110th (2007–2009)	Barbara Cubin (R)
111th (2009–2011)	Cynthia Lummis (R)
112th (2011–2013)	Cynthia Lummis (R)
113th (2013–2015)	Cynthia Lummis (R)
114th (2015–2017)	Cynthia Lummis (R)
115th (2017–2019)	Liz Cheney (R)
116th (2019–2021)	Liz Cheney (R)
117th (2021–2023)	Liz Cheney (R)
118th (2023–2025)	Harriet Hageman (R)
119th (2025–2027)	Harriet Hageman (R)
120th (2027–2029)	Chuck Gray (R)

== See also ==
- List of United States congressional districts
- Wyoming's congressional districts
- Political party strength in Wyoming
