= Governor Hale =

Governor Hale may refer to:

- John Hale (British Army officer) (1728–1806), Governor of Londonderry
- Samuel W. Hale (1823–1891), 39th Governor of New Hampshire
- William Hale (Wyoming politician) (1832–1885), Governor of Wyoming Territory
