= Joseph M. Carey =

American judge and politician (1845–1924)

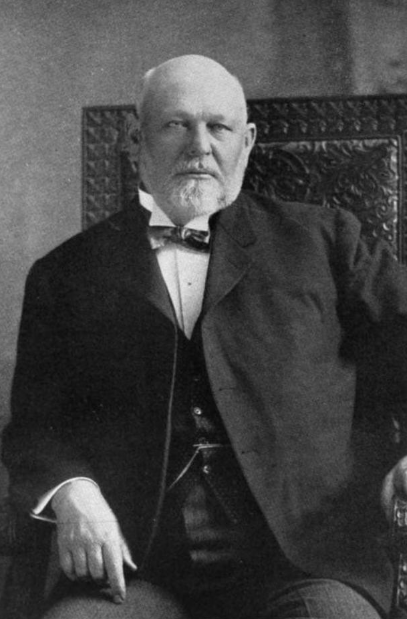

8th Governor of Wyoming
- In office January 2, 1911 – January 4, 1915
- Preceded by: Bryant Butler Brooks
- Succeeded by: John B. Kendrick

United States Senator from Wyoming
- In office November 15, 1890 – March 3, 1895
- Succeeded by: Francis E. Warren

Member of the U.S. House of Representatives from Wyoming Territory's at-large district
- In office March 4, 1885 – July 10, 1890; Delegate
- Preceded by: Morton Everel Post
- Succeeded by: (none); District Eliminated

14th Mayor of Cheyenne, Wyoming
- In office 1881–1885
- Preceded by: F. E. Addoms
- Succeeded by: Francis E. Warren

Associate Justice of the Wyoming Supreme Court
- In office January 18, 1872 – 1876
- Succeeded by: Jacob B. Blair

Personal details
- Born: January 19, 1845 Milton, Delaware, United States
- Died: February 5, 1924 (aged 79) Cheyenne, Wyoming, United States
- Party: Progressive (1912–24); Republican (Before 1910; 1912); Democratic (1910–12)
- Spouse: Louisa David
- Children: 2, including Robert D. Carey
- Parents: Robert Hood Carey (father); Susan Pitt Davis (mother)
- Education: University of Pennsylvania (LL.B.)
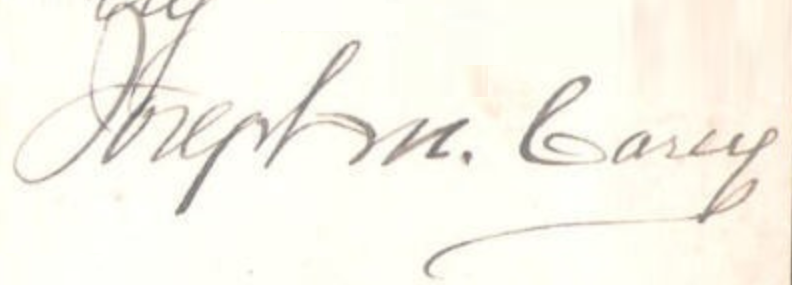
- Signature

Joseph Maull Carey (January 19, 1845 – February 5, 1924) was an American lawyer, rancher, judge, and politician, who was active in Wyoming local, state, and federal politics.

In the 1860s, Carey practiced law in the eastern United States and participated in Pennsylvania and New Jersey politics. In 1869, he was appointed by President Ulysses S. Grant as the United States attorney in the Wyoming Territory and later to the Wyoming Supreme Court. After serving as the 14th Mayor of Cheyenne, Wyoming, he was elected to serve as Wyoming's delegate to the United States House of Representatives, where he introduced legislation admitting Wyoming as a state. Upon Wyoming's statehood, he was selected to serve as the state's first senator alongside Francis E. Warren.

In 1910, he left the Republican Party and was elected as Governor of Wyoming with the Democratic nomination. He retired from politics after leaving the governorship in 1914. He is to date the last mayor of Cheyenne to be elected governor.

== Early life ==
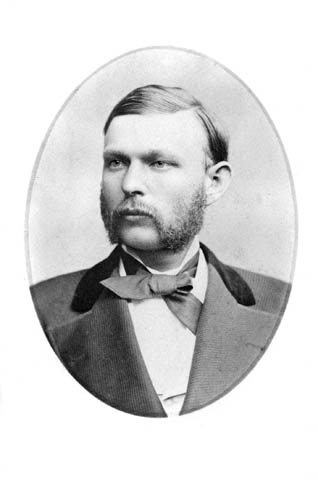
Young Joseph M. Carey

Joseph Maull Carey was born on January 19, 1845, in Milton, Delaware, to Robert Hood Carey and Susan Pitt Davis. He attended the Fort Edward Collegiate Institute until he was a sophomore in 1865. He studied law in the offices of B. F. Temple, W. L. Dennis, and Henry Flanders before graduating with a bachelor of laws from the University of Pennsylvania in 1867. On September 27, 1877, he married Louisa David and later had two children with her.

== Career ==
=== Politics ===
During the 1866 and 1869 Pennsylvania gubernatorial elections, Carey supported and gave speeches in favor of Governor John W. Geary. He cast his first vote in 1866 and was later asked by the chairman of the Republican Party of New Jersey to give speeches in multiple New Jersey towns.

On April 3, 1869, Carey was nominated by President Ulysses S. Grant as the first United States attorney in the Wyoming Territory and arrived on May 8. On December 14, 1871, he was nominated as an associate justice of the Wyoming Supreme Court by Grant, confirmed by the Senate on January 18, 1872, and served until 1876.

During the second session of the United States Centennial Commission, Carey was selected to represent the Wyoming Territory and served on the Committee on Nomination of Secretaries of Departments. Carey abstained when the commission voted on whether or not to allow the Centennial Exposition to remain open on Sundays.

In 1876, he was selected to serve as the Wyoming Territory's National Republican committeeman on the Republican National Committee and remained in the position until 1897.

=== Mayor ===
In 1880, Carey was elected as mayor of Cheyenne, Wyoming while he was out of state by running on a public works improvement platform. He was reelected in 1881, and again without opposition in 1882. During his tenure as mayor, the city's water and sewage systems were completed, an opera house was built, and the Stock Growers National Bank was organized and selected Carey to serve as its first president.

The Wyoming Development Company was founded in 1883 with the intention of bringing water to thousands of arid acres of land in the Wheatland Flats. In 1885, Carey was selected to lead the organization and built a reservoir using water from the Laramie River. Water from the reservoir was transferred throughout the flats through canals and ditches and successfully irrigated 50,000 acres of land, allowing the area to become inhabitable.

=== U.S. House of Representatives ===
On July 30, 1874, the Wyoming Republican Party unanimously nominated Carey at its state convention to serve as the territory's delegate to the United States House of Representatives from the at-large congressional district, but was narrowly defeated by incumbent Democratic Delegate William Randolph Steele.

On October 22, 1884, Carey was given the Republican nomination for the at-large congressional district after Francis E. Warren declined the nomination. In the general election, he defeated Democratic nominee William H. Holliday. During the 1886 election, the Wyoming Democratic Party did not nominate a candidate for the at-large congressional district and Carey received almost ninety percent of the popular vote with the remainder being split among Democratic write-in candidates. On October 8, 1888, he received the Republican nomination again and was reelected against Democratic nominee Caleb P. Organ.

On May 18, 1887, he gave a speech at the dedication ceremony of the Wyoming State Capitol building.

When Territorial Governor William Hale died, Carey asked President Chester A. Arthur to nominate Warren, as he was a resident of Wyoming, rather than select a non-resident. Warren was nominated and the rest of Wyoming's territorial governors until statehood were residents of Wyoming. President Benjamin Harrison offered to appoint Carey to an important position in Wyoming, but he declined as he wanted to work towards Wyoming statehood.

In 1889, Carey proposed legislation that would admit Wyoming as a state, but Congress did not act upon on his proposal. Although Carey's proposal was unsuccessful, Governor Warren still ordered an election for delegates to a constitutional convention to write a state constitution. On March 26, 1890, Carey introduced legislation to admit Wyoming as a state, passed by the House of Representatives by a vote of 139 to 127 in favor, and passed the Senate with 29 to 18 in favor. The legislation was signed into law by President Benjamin Harrison on July 10, 1890. Although Wyoming had a population of less than 60,000 at the time of its statehood, Carey stated that it did not matter as several other states had been admitted with populations lower than Wyoming's.

=== United States Senate ===
Following Wyoming's statehood, the first state legislature held a session at the order of Governor Warren. On November 12, 1890, the state legislature voted on the appointment of its two senators to the United States Senate. Carey defeated George W. Baxter while Warren defeated M. C. Brown, John McCormick, H. R. Mann, and Henry A. Coffeen. In 1895, he ran for reelection, but the state legislature unanimously voted in favor of Francis E. Warren due to Carey's opposition to the free silver movement.

=== Interlude ===
In 1894, he was named as honorary chancellor of Union College and was given an honorary LL. D. During the 1896 United States presidential election he stated that Governor William McKinley would narrowly defeat William Jennings Bryan. In 1897, a constitutional convention was held in Delaware where a letter from Carey in support of women's suffrage was read on February 16. On September 6, he and his brother, Davis Carey, were thrown from a carriage. Joseph Carey received cuts on his head while Davis was uninjured.

=== Governor ===
==== Election ====
In May 1910, Carey announced that he would seek the Republican nomination for the Wyoming gubernatorial election. In June, he and former state Treasurer William C. Irvine, who served as Carey's campaign manager, campaigned across Wyoming. On September 10, he announced that he would run as an independent in the gubernatorial election in order to break the Republican political machine that controlled Wyoming.

On September 21, he defeated William L. Kuykendall for the Democratic gubernatorial nomination. In the general election, he defeated Republican nominee William E. Mullen and Socialist nominee W. W. Paterson and won every county.

==== Tenure ====
On January 21, 1911, nine senators, six governors, and thirteen representatives from the Republican Progressive League signed a declaration of principles supporting progressive legislation. Carey was one of the signatories. On January 29, 1912, he endorsed former President Theodore Roosevelt for the Republican presidential nomination against incumbent President William Howard Taft. On July 15, he issued a call for a Progressive state convention to select delegates to attend the national convention of Roosevelt's Progressive Party. Although Wyoming had a member of Roosevelt's Progressive Party as its governor, in the presidential election, Roosevelt placed third behind Taft, who placed second, and Governor Woodrow Wilson, who won the state. In the House of Representatives election, Charles E. Winter, the Progressive Party's nominee for Wyoming's at-large congressional district, placed third behind Democratic nominee Thomas P. Fahey and incumbent Republican Representative Frank Wheeler Mondell.

On January 20, 1913, fighting broke out in the Wyoming House of Representatives during the selection of the Speaker of the House. Carey was asked to restore order to the state house, but declined to intervene. During his tenure as governor, he pardoned sixty-three people and commuted the sentences of ninety-six people.

== Later life ==
On October 14, 1916, Carey endorsed incumbent President Woodrow Wilson for reelection during the 1916 presidential election against Republican nominee Charles Evans Hughes. In 1917, he came out in support of the prohibition of alcohol in the United States.

In 1918, his son, Robert D. Carey, won the gubernatorial election with the Republican nomination, making Joseph Carey the only governor of Wyoming to be the father of another governor of Wyoming. In January 1922, Joseph and Robert Carey traveled through the eastern United States. In January 1924, he suffered a stroke and later died on February 5.

Following his death, he was honored by the Casper Kiwanis branch alongside former President Woodrow Wilson. On February 8, all business in Wyoming was suspended and members of the state government, including Governor William B. Ross, eulogized Carey. On February 13, the Wyoming Supreme Court had resolutions written by Hugo Donzelman, Thomas Hunter, and Anthony C. Campbell eulogizing Carey placed into the record.

In 1959, he was inducted into the National Cowboy Hall of Fame.

== Electoral history ==
Joseph M. Carey electoral history

1874 Wyoming Territory's at-large congressional district election
Party	Candidate	Votes	%	±%
Democratic	William Randolph Steele (incumbent)	2,506	56.53%	+2.76%
Republican	Joseph M. Carey	1,927	43.47%	−2.76%
Total votes		4,433	100.00%	

1884 Wyoming Territory's at-large congressional district election
Party	Candidate	Votes	%	±%
Republican	Joseph M. Carey	7,225	56.53%	+11.68%
Democratic	William H. Holliday	5,586	43.60%	−11.68%
Total votes		12,811	100.00%	

1886 Wyoming Territory's at-large congressional district election
Party	Candidate	Votes	%	±%
Republican	Joseph M. Carey (incumbent)	8,259	88.12%	+31.59%
Democratic	H. G. Balch (write-in)	524	5.59%	−38.01%
Democratic	T. G. Magee (write-in)	340	3.63%	−39.97%
Write-in		134	1.43%	+1.43%
Democratic	J. M. Lobban (write-in)	69	0.74%	−42.86%
Democratic	L. Kabis (write-in)	46	0.49%	−43.11%
Total votes		9,372	100.00%	

1888 Wyoming Territory's at-large congressional district election
Party	Candidate	Votes	%	±%
Republican	Joseph M. Carey (incumbent)	10,451	58.04%	−30.08%
Democratic	Caleb P. Organ	7,557	41.97%	+31.52%
Total votes		18,008	100.00%	

1890 Wyoming United States Senate special election
Party	Candidate	Votes	%
Republican	Joseph M. Carey	39	84.78%
Democratic	George W. Baxter	7	15.22%
Total votes		46	100.00%

1910 Wyoming gubernatorial election
Party	Candidate	Votes	%	±%
Democratic	Joseph M. Carey	21,086	55.60%	+20.75%
Republican	William E. Mullen	15,235	40.17%	−20.03%
Socialist	W. W. Paterson	1,605	4.23%	−0.33%
Total votes		37,926	100.00%	

Party political offices
Preceded by Stephen A. D. Keister	Democratic nominee for Governor of Wyoming; 1910	Succeeded by John B. Kendrick
Legal offices
Preceded by John H. Howe	Associate Justice of the Supreme Court of Wyoming; 1871–1876	Succeeded by Jacob B. Blair
Political offices
Preceded by ??	Mayor of Cheyenne, Wyoming; 1881–1885	Succeeded by Francis E. Warren
Preceded by Bryant B. Brooks	Governor of Wyoming; January 2, 1911 – January 4, 1915	Succeeded by John B. Kendrick
U.S. House of Representatives
Preceded by Morton Everel Post	Delegate to the U.S. House of Representatives from Wyoming Territory's at-large congressional district March 4, 1885 – July 10, 1890	Succeeded by (none); District Eliminated
U.S. Senate
Preceded by (none)	U.S. senator (Class 2) from Wyoming; November 15, 1890 – March 4, 1895; Served alongside: Francis E. Warren	Succeeded by Francis E. Warren
