= Wyoming Territory's at-large congressional district =

Coordinates: 43°N 107.5°W

- Obsolete district
- Created: 1869, as a non-voting delegate was granted by Congress
- Eliminated: 1890, as a result of statehood
- Years active: 1869–1890

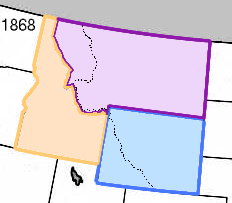
Wyoming Territory (blue) with Idaho and Montana in 1868

Wyoming Territory's at-large congressional district is an obsolete congressional district that encompassed the area of the Wyoming Territory. After Wyoming's admission to the Union as the 44th state by act of Congress on July 10, 1890, this district was dissolved and replaced by Wyoming's at-large congressional district.

== List of delegates representing the district ==
On July 25, 1868, an act of Congress gave Wyoming Territory the authority to elect a Congressional delegate, although the first delegate did not take his seat until 1869.

Delegate (District home)	Party	Years	Cong ress	Electoral history
District established December 6, 1869
Stephen Friel Nuckolls (Cheyenne)	Democratic	December 6, 1869 – March 3, 1871	41st	Elected in 1869. Retired.
William Theopilus Jones (Cheyenne)	Republican	March 4, 1871 – March 3, 1873	42nd	Elected in 1870. Lost re-election.
William Randolph Steele (Cheyenne)	Democratic	March 4, 1873 – March 3, 1877	43rd 44th	Elected in 1872. Re-elected in 1874. Lost re-election.
William Wellington Corlett (Cheyenne)	Republican	March 4, 1877 – March 3, 1879	45th	Elected in 1876. Retired.
Stephen Wheeler Downey (Laramie City)	Republican	March 4, 1879 – March 3, 1881	46th	Elected in 1878. Retired.
Morton Everel Post (Cheyenne)	Democratic	March 4, 1881 – March 3, 1885	47th 48th	Elected in 1880. Re-elected in 1882. Retired.
Joseph M. Carey (Cheyenne)	Republican	March 4, 1885 – July 10, 1890	49th 50th 51st	Elected in 1884. Re-elected in 1886. Re-elected in 1888. Retired when elected U.S. senator.
District dissolved July 10, 1890

== Elections ==
Between 1869 and 1888, the Wyoming Territory elected non-voting delegates to the United States Congress from its at-large congressional district. The district was dissolved in 1890 upon Wyoming's admission to the Union.

=== 1869 ===
Results by county Nuckolls: 50–60%; 60–70%; 80–90%

Democratic candidate Stephen Friel Nuckolls won the general election held on September 2, 1869.

County	Democratic Stephen Friel Nuckolls		Republican William W. Corlett		Total
County	Vote	%	Vote	%	Total	Maj.	%
Albany	515	61.68	320	38.32	835	+195	+23.35
Carbon	389	67.18	190	32.82	579	+199	+34.37
Carter	862	59.24	593	40.76	1,455	+269	+18.49
Laramie	886	55.10	722	44.90	1,608	+164	+10.20
Uinta	649	82.47	138	17.53	787	+511	+64.93
Total	3,301	62.71	1,963	37.29	5,264	+1,338	+25.42

=== 1870 ===
Results by county Jones: 50–60%; Wanless: 50–60%

Republican candidate William T. Jones won the general election held on September 6, 1870.

County	Republican William T. Jones		Republican John Wanless		Total
County	Vote	%	Vote	%	Total	Maj.	%
Albany	428	53.70	369	46.30	797	+59	+7.40
Carbon	150	45.05	183	54.95	333	-33	-9.91
Laramie	401	51.28	381	48.72	782	+20	+2.56
Sweetwater	363	56.54	279	43.46	642	+84	+13.08
Uinta	327	58.92	228	41.08	555	+99	+17.84
Total	1,669	53.68	1,440	46.32	3,109	+229	+7.37

=== 1872 ===
Results by county Steele: 50–60%; 60–70%; 70–80%; Jones: 60–70%

Democratic candidate William R. Steele defeated incumbent Republican delegate William T. Jones in the general election held on September 3, 1872.

County	Democratic William R. Steele		Republican William T. Jones*		Total
County	Vote	%	Vote	%	Total	Maj.	%
Albany	563	61.06	359	38.94	922	+204	+22.13
Carbon	261	76.76	79	23.24	340	+182	+53.53
Laramie	572	52.48	518	47.52	1,090	+54	+4.95
Sweetwater	186	31.79	399	68.21	585	-213	-36.41
Uinta	351	53.34	307	46.66	658	+44	+6.69
Total	1,933	53.77	1,662	46.23	3,595	+271	+7.54

An asterisk (*) denotes an incumbent.

=== 1874 ===
Results by county Steele: 50–60%; 60–70%

Incumbent Democratic delegate William R. Steele won re-election in the general election held on September 1, 1874.

County	Democratic William R. Steele*		Republican Joseph M. Carey		Total
County	Vote	%	Vote	%	Total	Maj.	%
Albany	246	66.67	123	33.33	369	+123	+33.33
Carbon	363	56.28	282	43.72	645	+81	12.56
Laramie	881	56.91	667	43.09	1,548	+214	+13.82
Sweetwater	406	57.02	306	42.98	712	+100	+14.04
Uinta	610	52.63	549	47.37	1,159	+61	+5.26
Total	2,506	56.53	1,927	43.47	4,433	+579	+13.06

An asterisk (*) denotes an incumbent.

=== 1876 ===
Results by county Corlett: 50–60%; 60–70%; No votes

Republican candidate William W. Corlett defeated incumbent Democratic delegate William R. Steele in the general election held on November 7, 1876.

County	Republican William W. Corlett		Democratic William R. Steele*		Total
County	Vote	%	Vote	%	Total	Maj.	%
Albany	1,010	65.46	533	34.54	1,543	+477	+30.91
Carbon	529	56.52	407	43.48	936	+122	+13.03
Laramie	1,242	56.92	940	43.08	2,182	+302	+13.84
Sweetwater	496	53.97	423	46.03	919	+73	+7.94
Uinta	587	56.23	457	43.77	1,044	+130	+12.45
Total	3,864	58.33	2,760	41.67	6,624	+1,104	+16.67

An asterisk (*) denotes an incumbent.

=== 1878 ===
Results by county Downey: 50–60%; 60–70%; 70–80%; Pease: 50–60%; No votes

Republican candidate Stephen W. Downey won the general election held on November 5, 1878.

County	Republican Stephen W. Downey		Democratic E. L. Pease		Total
County	Vote	%	Vote	%	Total	Maj.	%
Albany	1,118	71.62	443	28.38	1,561	+675	+43.24
Carbon	651	67.53	313	32.47	964	+338	+35.06
Laramie	1,101	51.38	1,042	48.62	2,143	+59	+2.75
Sweetwater	518	49.62	526	50.38	1,044	-8	-0.77
Uinta	474	48.82	497	51.18	971	-23	-2.37
Total	3,862	57.79	2,821	42.21	6,683	+1,041	+15.58

=== 1880 ===
Results by county Post: 50–60%; Swan: 50–60%; No votes

Democratic candidate Morton Everel Post won the general election held on November 2, 1880.

County	Democratic Morton Everel Post		Republican A. H. Swan		Total
County	Vote	%	Vote	%	Total	Maj.	%
Albany	737	44.29	927	55.71	1664	-190	-11.42
Carbon	717	52.72	643	47.28	1,360	+74	+5.44
Laramie	1,416	54.65	1,175	45.35	2,591	+241	+9.30
Sweetwater	494	48.10	533	51.90	1,027	-39	-3.80
Uinta	543	52.98	482	47.02	1,025	+61	+5.95
Total	3,907	50.96	3,760	49.04	7,667	+147	+1.92

=== 1882 ===
Results by county Post: 50–60%; 60–70%; Meldrum: 50–60%; No votes

Incumbent Democratic delegate Morton Everel Post won re-election in the general election held on November 7, 1882.

County	Democratic Morton Everel Post*		Republican John W. Meldrum		Total
County	Vote	%	Vote	%	Total	Maj.	%
Albany	1,200	48.50	1,274	51.50	2,474	-74	-2.99
Carbon	805	49.81	811	50.19	1,616	-6	-0.37
Johnson	335	60.80	216	39.20	551	+119	+21.60
Laramie	2,161	65.31	1,148	34.69	3,309	+1,013	+30.61
Sweetwater	605	47.90	658	52.10	1,263	-53	-4.20
Uinta	707	54.30	595	45.70	1,302	+112	+8.60
Total	5,813	55.28	4,702	44.72	10,515	+1,111	+10.57

An asterisk (*) denotes an incumbent.

=== 1884 ===
Results by county Carey: 50–60%; 60–70%; Holliday: 50–60%; No votes

Republican candidate Joseph M. Carey won the general election held on November 4, 1884.

County	Republican Joseph M. Carey		Democratic William H. Holliday		Total
County	Vote	%	Vote	%	Total	Maj.	%
Albany	1,424	56.76	1,085	43.24	2,509	+339	+13.51
Carbon	1,022	53.62	884	46.38	1,906	+138	+7.24
Fremont	363	55.59	290	44.41	653	+73	+11.18
Johnson	675	51.45	637	48.55	1312	+38	+2.90
Laramie	2,448	62.46	1,471	37.54	3,919	+977	+24.93
Sweetwater	654	61.35	412	38.65	1,066	+242	+22.70
Uinta	639	44.19	807	55.81	1,446	-168	-11.62
Total	7,225	56.40	5,586	43.60	12,811	+1,639	+12.79

=== 1886 ===
Results by county Carey: 50–60%; 60–70%; 80–90%; 90–100%; No votes

Incumbent Republican delegate Joseph M. Carey won re-election in the general election held on November 2, 1886.

County	Republican Joseph M. Carey*		Democratic H.G. Balch		Democratic T.G. Magee		Others		Total
County	Vote	%	Vote	%	Vote	%	Vote	%	Total	Maj.	%
Albany	1524	99.22	—	—	—	—	12	0.78	1,536	+1,512	+98.44
Carbon	1,034	94.60	—	—	25	2.29	34	3.11	1,093	+1,000	+91.49
Crook	495	57.03	371	42.74	—	—	2	0.23	868	+124	+14.29
Fremont	513	80.41	115	18.03	5	0.78	5	0.78	638	+398	+62.38
Johnson	822	84.83	38	3.92	—	—	109	11.25	969	+753	+77.71
Laramie	2,304	96.89	—	—	—	—	74	3.11	2,378	+2,258	+94.95
Sweetwater	643	67.47	—	—	310	32.53	—	—	953	+333	+34.94
Uinta	924	98.61	—	—	—	—	13	1.39	937	+911	+97.23
Total	8,259	88.12	524	5.59	340	3.63	249	2.66	9,372	+7,735	+82.53

An asterisk (*) denotes an incumbent.

=== 1888 ===
Results by county Carey: 50–60%; 60–70%; 70–80%; Organ: 50–60%; 60–70%; No votes

Incumbent Republican delegate Joseph M. Carey won re-election in the general election held on November 6, 1888.

County	Republican Joseph M. Carey*		Democratic Caleb P. Organ		Total
County	Vote	%	Vote	%	Total	Maj.	%
Albany	1,584	60.74	1,024	39.26	2,608	+560	+21.47
Carbon	1,701	64.60	932	35.40	2,633	+769	+29.21
Converse	696	53.29	610	46.71	1,306	+86	+6.58
Crook	650	56.52	500	43.48	1,150	+150	+13.04
Fremont	460	43.98	586	56.02	1,046	-126	-12.05
Johnson	362	39.52	554	60.48	916	-192	-20.96
Laramie	1928	52.18	1767	47.82	3695	+161	+4.36
Sheridan	480	55.17	390	44.83	870	+90	+10.34
Sweetwater	1,153	66.00	594	34.00	1,747	+559	+32.00
Uinta	1,437	70.54	600	29.46	2,037	+837	+41.09
Total	10,451	58.04	7,557	41.96	18,008	+2894	+16.07

An asterisk (*) denotes an incumbent.

== See also ==
- Elections in Wyoming
- List of United States House of Representatives elections (1856–present)
