= William Theopilus Jones =

American politician (1842–1882)

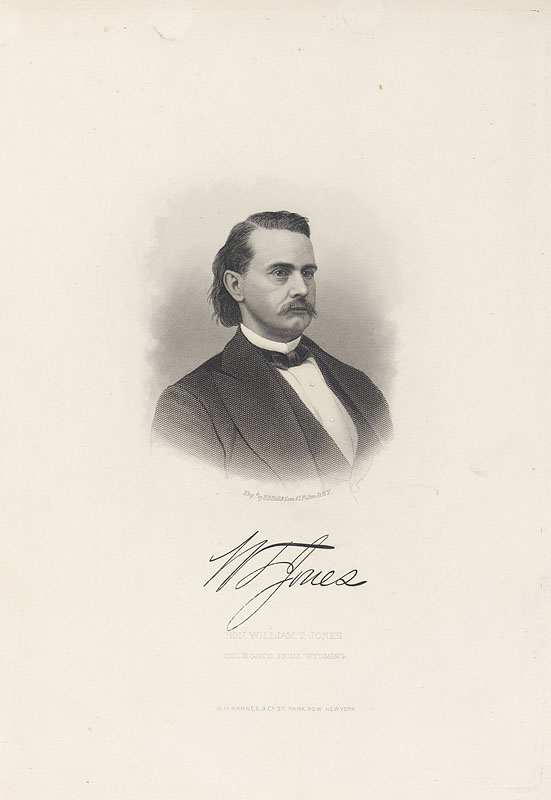
- Engraving by Henry Bryan Hall

Member of the U.S. House of Representatives from Wyoming Territory's at-large district
- In office March 4, 1871 – March 3, 1873 (Delegate)
- Preceded by: Stephen Friel Nuckolls
- Succeeded by: William Randolph Steele

Personal details
- Born: February 20, 1842 Corydon, Indiana, U.S.
- Died: October 9, 1882 (aged 40) Corydon, Indiana, U.S.
- Resting place: Cedar Hill Cemetery, Corydon, Indiana, U.S.
- Party: Republican
- Profession: Politician, lawyer, judge

Military service
- Allegiance: United States (Union)
- Branch/service: United States Army (Union Army)
- Years of service: 1861–1864
- Rank: Major
- Unit: 17th Indiana Volunteer Infantry
- Battles/wars: American Civil War; Battle of Chickamauga; Battle of Chattanooga

William Theopilus Jones (February 20, 1842 – October 9, 1882) was an American politician, lawyer, and judge who served a single term in the United States House of Representatives, representing the at-large congressional district of the Territory of Wyoming from 1871 to 1873 as a Republican delegate in the 42nd United States Congress.

== Early life and education ==
Jones was born in Corydon, Indiana on February 20, 1842. He received a liberal schooling and studied law.

== Career ==
Jones served in the Union Army during the American Civil War. He was commissioned as a first lieutenant in Company C of the 17th Indiana Volunteer Infantry on May 31, 1861; Jones was later promoted to captain on January 11, 1862, and major on February 2, 1863.

Jones's tenure with the regiment involved serving in both the Army of the Ohio and the Army of the Cumberland. Jones was involved with operations in Mississippi, Kentucky, Tennessee, and Alabama, most notably the Battle of Chickamauga and the Battle of Chattanooga. (Note: Jones was a successful combat leader having temporarily commanded the regiment on several occasions, notably several skirmishes with Rebel cavalry under Maj. Gen Joseph Wheeler during the Siege of Chattanooga.) Following his honorable discharge on March 29, 1864, Jones returned to Corydon, Indiana, where he was admitted to the bar the following year.

Jones settled in Cheyenne, Wyoming in 1869. He was appointed associate justice of the supreme court of the Territory of Wyoming that same year.

In 1870, Jones was elected as a Republican to represent the at-large congressional district of the Territory of Wyoming as a delegate in the 42nd United States Congress. His time in office began on March 4, 1871, and concluded on March 3, 1873.

Jones was an unsuccessful candidate for re-election in 1872 to the 43rd United States Congress. Following his tenure in Congress, Jones resumed practicing law in Corydon, Indiana until his death in 1882.

Jones was a member of the Republican National Convention from the Territory of Wyoming in 1872.

== Death ==
Jones died at the age of 40 in Corydon on October 9, 1882. He was interred in Cedar Hill Cemetery, located in Corydon.

== See also ==
- List of United States representatives who served a single term

U.S. House of Representatives
| Preceded by Stephen Friel Nuckolls | Member of the U.S. House of Representatives from Wyoming Territory's at-large congressional district 1871–1873 | Succeeded by William Randolph Steele |
