= William Wellington Corlett =

American politician

William W. Corlett
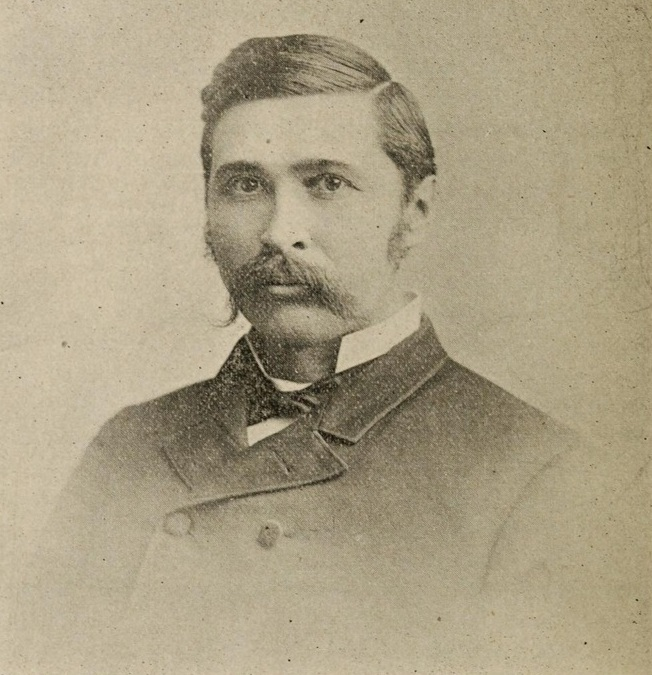

Member of the U.S. House of Representatives from Wyoming Territory's at-large district
- In office March 4, 1877 – March 3, 1879 (Delegate)
- Preceded by: William Randolph Steele
- Succeeded by: Stephen Wheeler Downey

Personal details
- Born: April 10, 1842 Concord, Ohio
- Died: July 22, 1890 (aged 48) Cheyenne, Wyoming
- Party: Republican
- Spouse: Minerva C. Franklin (m. 1873)
- Children: 1
- Education: University of Michigan; Union Law College
- Profession: Attorney

Military service
- Allegiance: United States Union
- Branch/service: United States Army; Union Army
- Years of service: 1861–1862; 1863–1865
- Rank: Corporal
- Unit: 28th Ohio Infantry; 87th Ohio Infantry; 25th Ohio Independent Light Artillery Battery; 3rd Iowa Independent Battery Light Artillery
- Battles/wars: Civil War

William Wellington Corlett (April 10, 1842 – July 22, 1890) was an American lawyer and politician who served as a congressional delegate from the Territory of Wyoming.

== Early life and education ==
Corlett was born in Concord, Ohio on April 10, 1842, a son of William Corlett and Mary Ann (Kneale), who was known as Ann. He attended the schools of Concord and taught school while attending the Willoughby (Ohio) Collegiate Institute, from which he graduated in 1861.

== Civil War service ==
With the outbreak of the Civil War, he enlisted in the Union Army in 1862 and served in the 28th Ohio Infantry and the 87th Ohio Infantry (a three-month regiment). He was captured with the regiment at the Battle of Harpers Ferry on September 15, 1862.

After receiving parole, Corlett returned to Ohio, where he taught school in Kirkland and Painesville. Corlett reentered the army with the 25th Ohio Independent Light Artillery Battery. He was later placed on detached service with the 3rd Iowa Independent Battery Light Artillery. He returned to Ohio in 1865 and mustered out of the army.

== Post-war ==
He attended law school at the University of Michigan Law School and in July 1866 he graduated from Ohio State and Union Law College in Cleveland. He was admitted to the bar the same year and became a professor in elementary law at the State University and Law College as well as lecturer at several commercial colleges in Cleveland.

== Career ==
He settled in Cheyenne, Wyoming, in 1867, and engaged in the practice of law. During some of the time in Wyoming, his law partner was John Alden Riner, who later served as a federal judge. Corlett was an unsuccessful Republican candidate for Delegate to the Forty-first Congress in 1869.

He was appointed postmaster of Cheyenne in 1870, a member of the Territorial senate in 1871 and prosecuting attorney of Laramie County from 1872 to 1876.

Corlett was elected as a Republican a Delegate to the Forty-fifth Congress (March 4, 1877 – March 3, 1879). He was not a candidate for renomination in 1878.

He resumed the practice of law and in 1879 declined the appointment as chief justice of Wyoming Territory. He served as member of the legislative council from 1880 to 1882.

== Death and burial ==
He died in Cheyenne, Wyoming, on July 22, 1890. He was interred at Lakeview Cemetery in Cheyenne.

== Family ==
In 1873, Corlett married Minerva C. Franklin in Des Moines, Iowa. They were the parents of a son, William W. Corlett Jr.

U.S. House of Representatives
Preceded by William Randolph Steele	Delegate to the U.S. House of Representatives from Wyoming Territory's at-large congressional district March 4, 1877 – March 3, 1879	Succeeded by Stephen Wheeler Downey
