= Stephen Friel Nuckolls =

American politician (1825–1879)

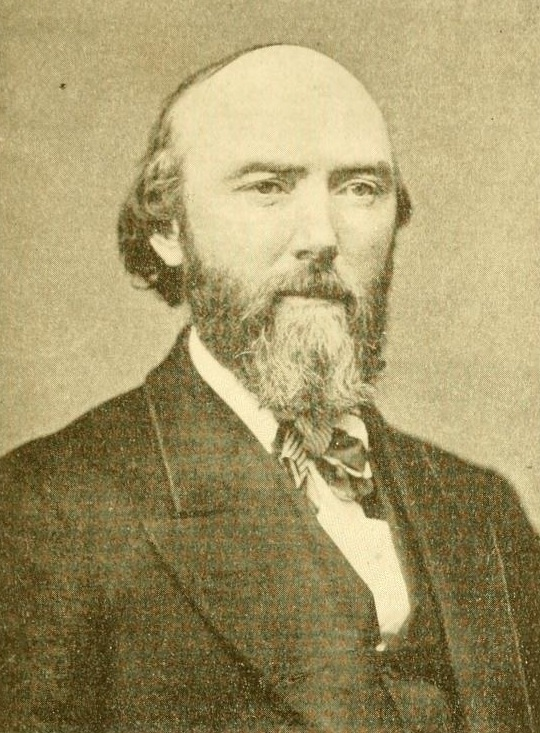
- From 1914's Pioneer Settlers of Grayson County, Virginia by Benjamin Floyd Nuckolls.

Member of the U.S. House of Representatives from Wyoming Territory's at-large district
- In office December 6, 1869 – March 3, 1871; Delegate
- Preceded by: none District created
- Succeeded by: William Theopilus Jones

Personal details
- Born: August 16, 1825 Grayson County, Virginia, US
- Died: February 14, 1879 (aged 53) Salt Lake City, Utah, US
- Party: Democratic

Stephen Friel Nuckolls (August 16, 1825 – February 14, 1879) was a Delegate from the Territory of Wyoming and co-founder of Nebraska City, Nebraska. Nuckolls County, Nebraska and Nuckolls Square Park in Nebraska City are named after him.

== Biography ==
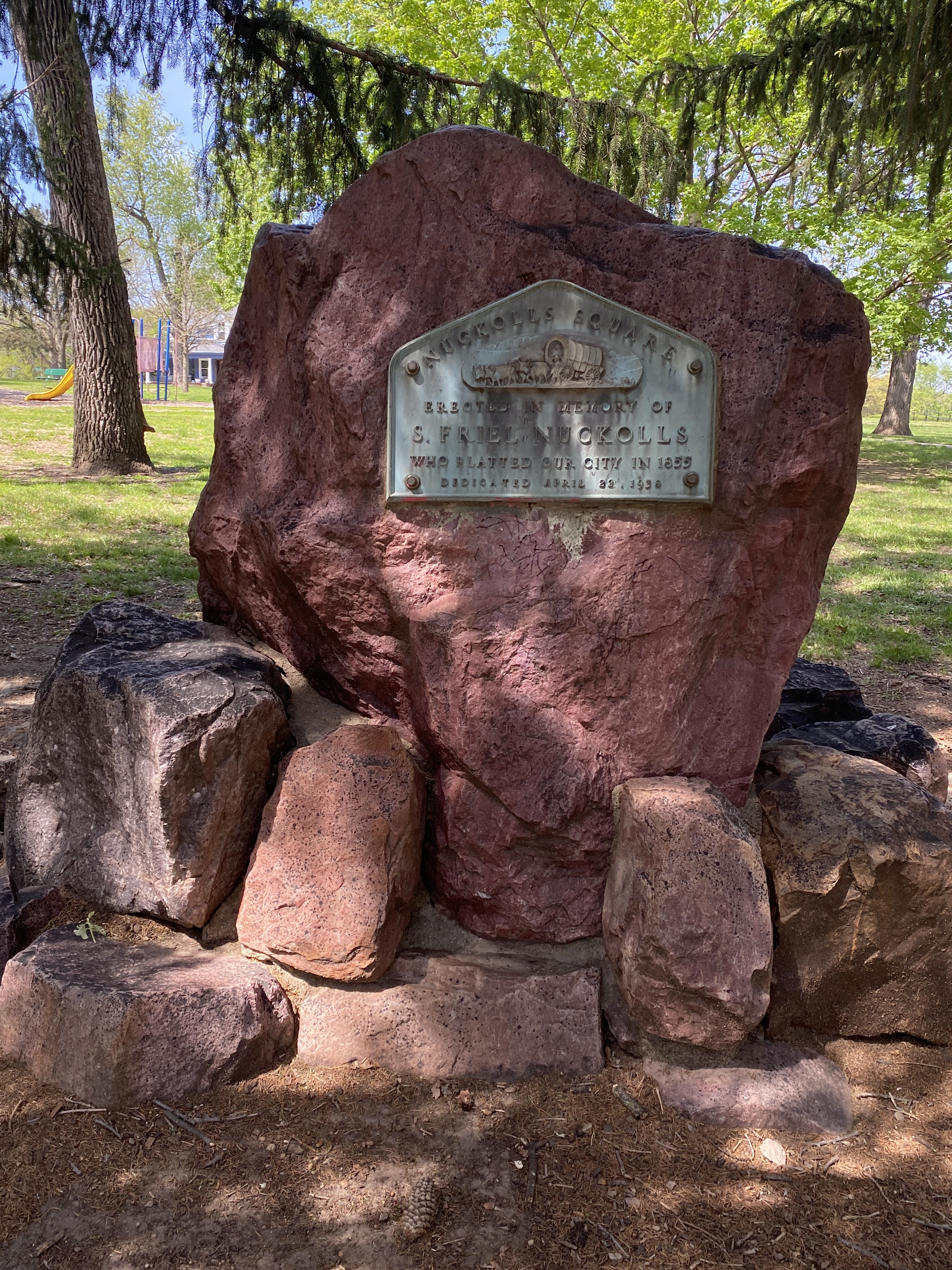
Plaque dedicated to S. Friel Nuckolls in Nuckolls Square Park, Nebraska City, 2026

Nuckolls was born in Grayson County, Virginia, where he completed preparatory studies. He moved to Linden, Missouri, in 1846. He engaged in mercantile pursuits from 1847 to 1853. After that, he moved to the Territory of Nebraska in 1854 and founded Nebraska City. He held several local offices in Nebraska City. In 1855 he established the Platte Valley Bank. Nuckolls served in the Nebraska Territorial Legislature in 1859.

Nuckolls was known for bringing the first four slaves into Nebraska, two of whom escaped in 1858. Nuckolls offered a $200 reward for the return of the two women, known as Eliza Grayson and "Celia," 14, and organized a posse that pursued the two all the way to Chicago. Eliza was initially reported to be 16, but records show she was actually 20. Nuckolls and a professional kidnapper found Eliza in Chicago two years after her escape. However, Nuckolls and Grayson were arrested by Chicago law enforcement and put into a local jail. There, an abolitionist mob broke Eliza from the jail and secured her safe travel to Canada, where she disappeared. Nuckolls also escaped, only to be hunted down by a mob of abolitionists. City councilman Hiram Joy gave him a disguise and helped him leave the city, when he went back to Nebraska. The 500-mile journey of the two young women from Nebraska City to Chicago was recreated by a group of high school students in 2016.

Nuckolls moved to the Territory of Colorado in 1860 and engaged in banking and mining. In 1864 he moved to New York City. He moved to the Territory of Dakota in 1867 and settled in Cheyenne. In Cheyenne, he engaged in mercantile pursuits. Upon the organization of the Territory of Wyoming he was elected as a Democrat to the Forty-first Congress and served from December 6, 1869, to March 3, 1871. He was an unsuccessful candidate for reelection in 1870 to the Forty-second Congress. He resumed his mercantile pursuits.

Nuckolls served as a member of the second legislative council of Wyoming in 1871 and served as presiding officer. He served as a delegate to the Democratic National Conventions in 1872 and 1876. He moved to Salt Lake City, Utah, in July 1872 and engaged in milling. In Salt Lake City he died on February 14, 1879. He is interred in Mount Olivet Cemetery in Salt Lake City.

== Sources ==
- United States Congress. "Stephen Friel Nuckolls (id: N000166)". Biographical Directory of the United States Congress.

U.S. House of Representatives
| Preceded by none District created | Delegate to the U.S. House of Representatives from Wyoming Territory's at-large congressional district December 6, 1869 – March 3, 1871 | Succeeded by William Theopilus Jones |
