= William Randolph Steele =

American politician

William R. Steele
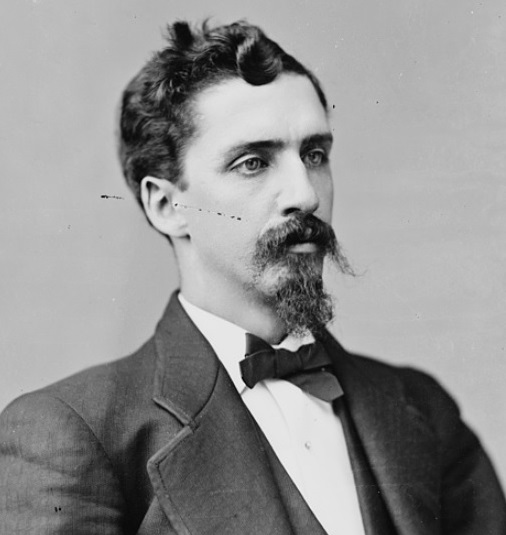

Member of the U.S. House of Representatives from Wyoming Territory's at-large district
- In office March 4, 1873 – March 3, 1877 (Delegate)
- Preceded by: William Theopilus Jones
- Succeeded by: William Wellington Corlett

Personal details
- Born: July 24, 1842 New York City, U.S.
- Died: November 30, 1901 (aged 59) Deadwood, South Dakota, U.S.
- Party: Democratic

William Randolph Steele (July 24, 1842 – November 30, 1901) was a Delegate from the Territory of Wyoming.

Born in New York City, Steele received an academic education. He studied law. He was admitted to the bar and practiced. During the Civil War served in the Second Army Corps from 1861 to 1865. He was discharged with the rank of captain and brevet lieutenant colonel. He moved to the Territory of Wyoming in 1869 and engaged in the practice of law in Cheyenne.

Steele was elected as a member of the Territorial legislative council in 1871 and served until March 4, 1873, when he resigned, having been elected to Congress.

While in the Territorial legislature, Steele led the effort to repeal woman suffrage in the territory. The repeal act passed the legislature, but was vetoed by the Governor, John Allen Campbell. Women's suffrage was thus preserved in the territory.

Steele was elected as a Democrat to the Forty-third and Forty-fourth Congresses (March 4, 1873 – March 3, 1877). He was an unsuccessful candidate for reelection in 1876 to the Forty-fifth Congress. He moved to Deadwood, South Dakota, and resumed the practice of law. He served as mayor of Deadwood 1894-1896. He died in Deadwood November 30, 1901. He was interred in Mount Moriah Cemetery.

== Sources ==
- United States Congress. "William Randolph Steele (id: S000840)". Biographical Directory of the United States Congress.

U.S. House of Representatives
Preceded by William Theopilus Jones	Delegate to the U.S. House of Representatives from Wyoming Territory's at-large congressional district March 4, 1873 – March 3, 1877	Succeeded by William Wellington Corlett
