= William Hale (Wyoming politician) =

American politician (1837–1885)

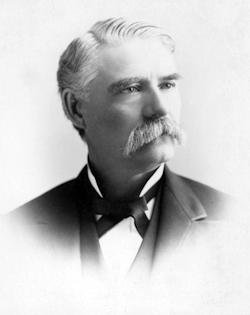
William Hale

William Hale (November 18, 1837 – January 13, 1885) was an American politician from Iowa. Hale served as Governor of Wyoming Territory from 1882 until his death in 1885.

== Early years ==
Hale was born in New London, a community in Henry County, Iowa. Hale attended public school. He was admitted to the bar association when he was twenty-one years old, and began to practice law.

== Political life ==
In 1868, Hale became a member of the Republican Party and was a presidential elector from Iowa in that year's election. He served in the Iowa House of Representatives from 1863 to 1866.

Several years later, on July 18, 1882, U.S. president Chester A. Arthur appointed Hale Governor of Wyoming Territory. Hale was sworn into office on August 3, 1882. Soon after his induction to the governorship, word came that Montana had been seeking to establish jurisdiction over Yellowstone National Park through Congress. Hearing this, Hale travelled thousands of miles in ailing health and chronic pain to reach the disputed land and physically claim it for Wyoming. This act endeared him to his constituents until his untimely death in Cheyenne, Wyoming, on January 13, 1885.
