= Wyoming Territory =

Former organized incorporated territory of the United States (1868–1890)

Territory of Wyoming
- Organized incorporated territory of the United States
- 1868–1890
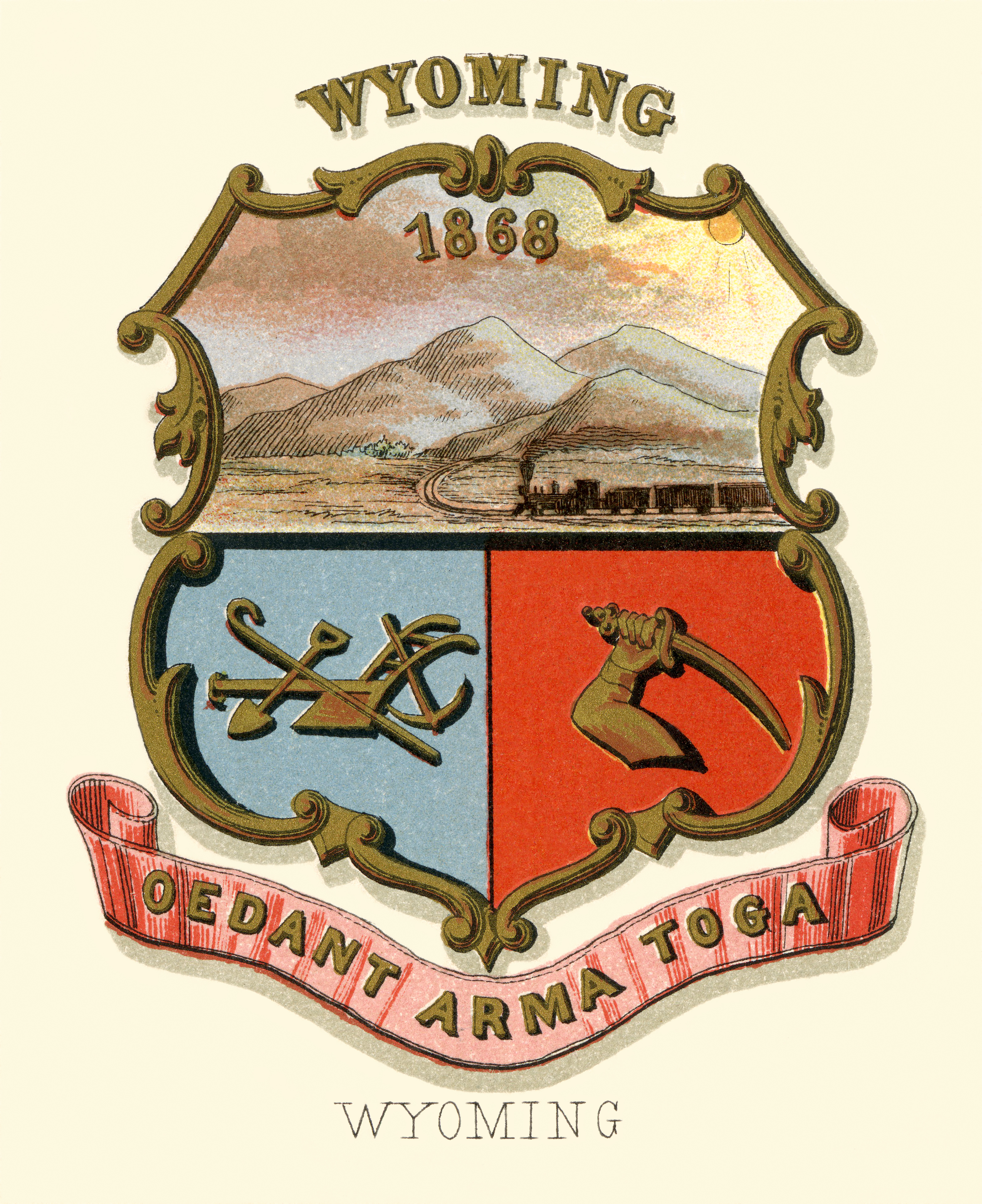
- Coat of arms

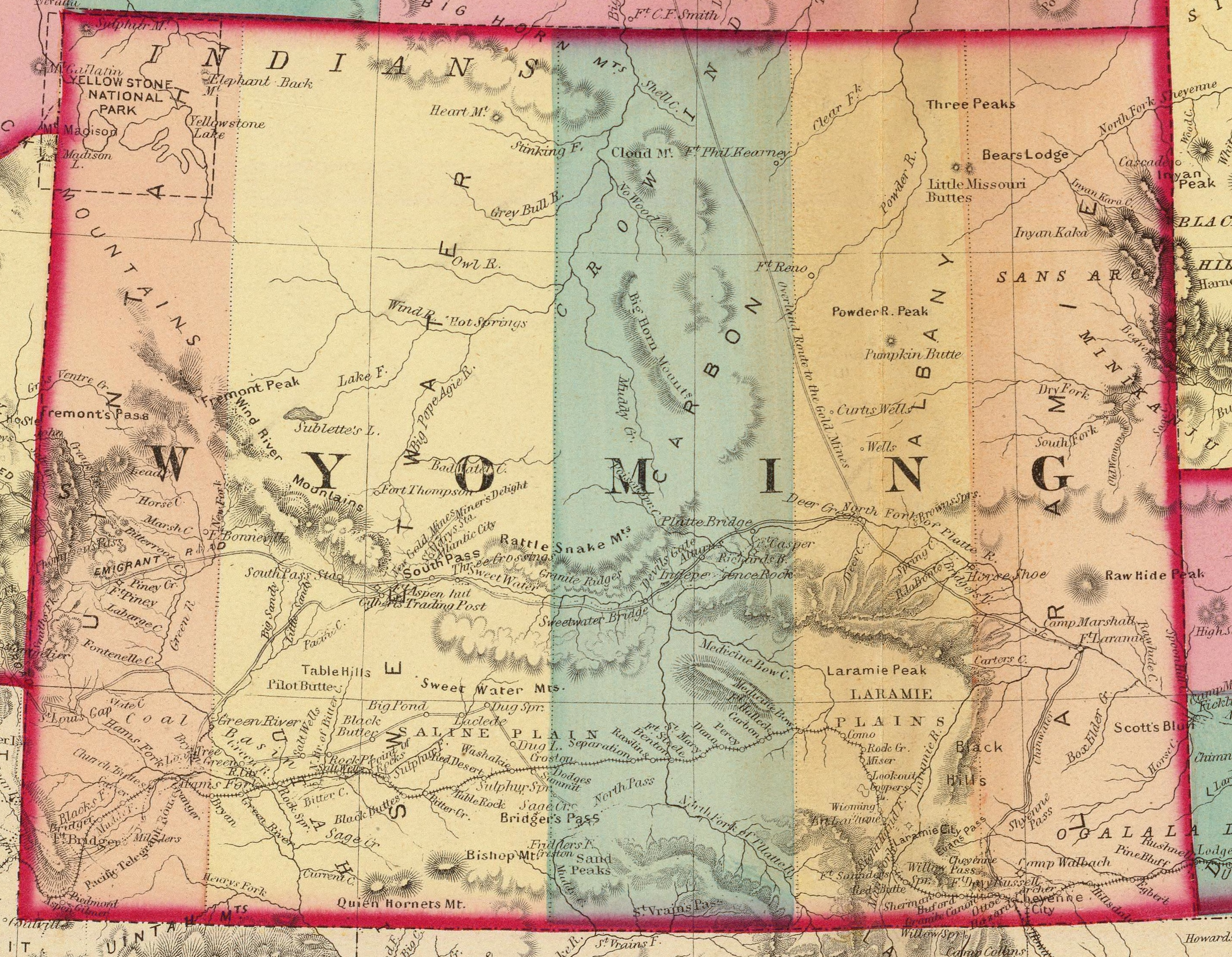
- The Wyoming Territory in 1872
- Capital: Cheyenne
- Government
  - Type: Organized incorporated territory
  - Motto: Cedant arma togae ("Let arms yield to the gown")
- History
  - Organic act: July 25, 1868
  - Statehood: July 10, 1890
Preceded by
Dakota Territory
Idaho Territory
Utah Territory
Succeeded by
Wyoming

The Territory of Wyoming was an organized incorporated territory of the United States that existed from July 25, 1868, until July 10, 1890, when it was admitted to the Union as the State of Wyoming. Cheyenne was the territorial capital. The boundaries of the Wyoming Territory were identical to those of the modern State of Wyoming.

== Background ==
Historical population
Year	Pop.	±%
1870	9,118	—
1880	20,789	+128.0%
1890	62,555	+200.9%
Source: 1870–1890;

Because of Wyoming's location as part of the Louisiana Purchase, the Oregon Country, and the Mexican Cession, the land which became Wyoming has a complicated history of territorial relationships. Portions of the territory, which eventually fell under Wyoming's jurisdiction, were at various points associated with the territories of Washington, Oregon, Idaho, Dakota, Nebraska, and Utah, and had previously belonged to the independent states of Great Britain, France, Spain, Mexico, and Texas.

The portion of the Wyoming Territory east of the continental divide was acquired by the U.S. in the 1803 Louisiana Purchase and organized into the Nebraska Territory in 1854. On March 2, 1861, the northern portion of the Nebraska Territory, including the northeastern portion of future Wyoming Territory, became part of the Dakota Territory, while the southeastern portion remained with Nebraska, forming an extended Nebraska "panhandle". In 1863, the Idaho Territory was formed; it included the entirety of the modern states of Idaho and Montana and almost all of modern Wyoming save the southwest corner.

The portion of the Wyoming Territory west of the continental divide and north of the 42nd parallel was originally part of the Oregon Country, which was organized into the Oregon Territory in 1848; when Oregon entered the union as a state under its present boundaries in 1859, this land became part of the Washington Territory. Although, its eastern part had been granted to the Nebraska Territory in 1854. The Idaho Territory subsumed this land as well, in 1863.

The southwestern corner of what became the Wyoming Territory, south of the 42nd parallel, became part of the United States with the 1848 Mexican Cession. An eastern section of this was once claimed by the Republic of Texas. In 1851, the portion of this land west of the continental divide was made part of the Utah Territory, and, with the organization of the Colorado Territory in 1861, most of it was transferred to the Nebraska Territory and subsumed into the Idaho Territory, in 1863. A small corner of Wyoming remained part of Utah until the creation of the Wyoming Territory, in 1868.

In 1864, with the formation of the Montana Territory, the southeastern section of the Idaho Territory (most of modern Wyoming) became briefly part of Dakota Territory once again, although a strip of land along the western border of what would become Wyoming remained part of the Idaho Territory.

== History ==
Native Americans lived in the region for centuries. On July 25, 1868, President Andrew Johnson signed the Wyoming Organic Act creating the Wyoming Territory using lands from the Dakota, Idaho, and Utah territories, and on April 17, 1869, the territorial government was organized. In 1869 the territory granted women's suffrage for all elections in an attempt to attract new settlers. A later attempt to repeal the law was defeated after the governor vetoed the repeal; the legislature failed to override the veto by one vote.

In 1872, Wyoming Territory had five counties: Albany, Carbon, Laramie, Sweetwater, and Uinta, each a tall narrow rectangle comprising approximately one-fifth of the territory.

On July 10, 1890, the territory was admitted as the forty-fourth state seven days after the Idaho territory was admitted by President Benjamin Harrison.

== See also ==
- Bibliography of Wyoming history
- History of Wyoming
- California Trail
- First transcontinental railroad
- Historic regions of the United States
- Mormon Trail
- Oregon Trail
- Territorial evolution of the United States
- Wyoming Territory's congressional delegations
