= 1914 Wyoming state elections =

A general election was held in the U.S. state of Wyoming on Tuesday, November 3, 1914. All of the state's executive officers—the Governor, Secretary of State, Auditor, Treasurer, and Superintendent of Public Instruction—were up for election. Governor Joseph M. Carey declined to seek re-election to a second term, and Democratic State Senator John B. Kendrick was elected as his successor. Republicans, however, won all of the other statewide executive offices, including picking up the Superintendent's office.

== Governor ==
Incumbent Democratic Governor Joseph M. Carey declined to seek re-election to a second term. State Senator John B. Kendrick won the Democratic nomination to succeed Carey unopposed, and faced former U.S. Attorney Hilliard S. Ridgely, the Republican nominee, in the general election. Kendrick defeated Ridgely by a decisive margin, but reduced from Carey's landslide victory four years earlier. Following Kendrick's election to the U.S. Senate in 1916, Secretary of State Frank L. Houx ascended to the governorship.

1914 Wyoming gubernatorial election
Party	Candidate	Votes	%	±%
Democratic	John B. Kendrick	22,387	51.61%	−3.99%
Republican	Hilliard S. Ridgely	19,174	44.20%	+4.03%
Socialist	Paul J. Paulson	1,816	4.19%	−0.05%
Majority		3,213	7.41%	−8.02%
Turnout		43,377	100.00%	
Democratic hold				

== Secretary of State ==
Incumbent Democratic Secretary of State Frank L. Houx ran for re-election to a second term. He won the Democratic primary unopposed and faced State Senate President Birney H. Sage, the Republican nominee, and attorney E.C. Raymond, the Progressive nominee, in the general election. Just as Houx's 1910 election was close, so was his re-election; he narrowly defeated Sage to win a second term, prevailing by just 120 votes. During Houx's term, Governor John B. Kendrick would be selected to the Senate, making Houx acting Governor until the 1918 gubernatorial election.

=== Democratic primary ===
==== Candidates ====
- Frank L. Houx, incumbent Secretary of State

==== Results ====
Democratic Party primary results
Party	Candidate	Votes	%
Democratic	Frank L. Houx (inc.)	6,318	100.00%
Total votes		6,318	100.00%

=== Republican primary ===
==== Candidates ====
- Birney H. Sage, President of the State Senate

==== Results ====
Republican Primary results
Party	Candidate	Votes	%
Republican	Birney H. Sage	9,573	100.00%
Total votes		9,573	100.00%

=== Progressive Party primary ===
==== Candidates ====
- E. C. Raymond

==== Results ====
Progressive Party primary results
Party	Candidate	Votes	%
Progressive	E. C. Raymond	334	100.00%
Total votes		334	100.00%

=== General election ===
==== Results ====
1914 Wyoming Secretary of State election
Party	Candidate	Votes	%	±%
Democratic	Frank L. Houx (inc.)	19,304	47.04%	−0.57%
Republican	Birney H. Sage	19,184	46.75%	−0.96%
Socialist	William Hill	1,813	4.42%	−0.26%
Progressive	E. C. Raymond	734	1.79%	—
Majority		120	0.29%	+0.19%
Turnout		41,035	100.00%	
Democratic hold				

== Auditor ==
Incumbent Republican State Auditor Robert B. Forsyth ran for re-election to a second term. He won the Republican primary unopposed and faced Douglas Mayor Campbell H. McWhinnie, the Democratic nominee, and businessman Thomas Blythe, the Progressive nominee. Forsyth won re-election by a wide margin.

=== Democratic primary ===
==== Candidates ====
- Campbell H. McWhinnie, Mayor of Douglas

==== Results ====
Democratic Party primary results
Party	Candidate	Votes	%
Democratic	Campbell H. McWHinnie	5,996	100.00%
Total votes		5,996	100.00%

=== Republican primary ===
==== Candidates ====
- Robert B. Forsyth, incumbent State Auditor

==== Results ====
Republican Primary results
Party	Candidate	Votes	%
Republican	Robert B. Forsyth (inc.)	9,779	100.00%
Total votes		9,779	100.00%

=== Progressive Party primary ===
==== Candidates ====
- M. N. Grant

==== Results ====
Progressive Party primary results
Party	Candidate	Votes	%
Progressive	M. N. Grant	332	100.00%
Total votes		332	100.00%

After M. N. Grant won the Progressive primary for State Auditor, he withdrew from consideration in protest of the Progressive Party's endorsement of John B. Kendrick for Governor. He was replaced on the ballot by Thomas Blythe, an Evanston businessman.

=== General election ===
==== Results ====
1914 Wyoming Auditor election
Party	Candidate	Votes	%	±%
Republican	Robert B. Forsyth (inc.)	20,794	51.41%	+4.79%
Democratic	Campbell H. McWhinnie	16,848	41.65%	−7.06%
Socialist	J. A. Green	1,826	4.51%	−0.16%
Progressive	Thomas Blyth	983	2.43%	—
Majority		3,946	9.76%	+7.66%
Turnout		40,451	100.00%	
Republican hold				

== Treasurer ==
Incumbent Republican State Treasurer Joseph L. Baird was barred from seeking re-election to a second term, creating an open seat. State Representative Herman B. Gates won the Republican primary over W. G. Birkhauser, and advanced to the general election, where he faced Fremont County Treasurer Fred L. Thompson, the Democratic nominee, and W. S. Knittle, the Progressive nominee. Gates narrowly defeated Thompson, winning by just 246 votes, or 0.60% of the vote.

=== Democratic primary ===
==== Candidates ====
- Fred L. Thompson, Fremont County Treasurer

==== Results ====
Democratic Party primary results
Party	Candidate	Votes	%
Democratic	Fred L. Thompson	6,123	100.00%
Total votes		6,123	100.00%

=== Republican primary ===
==== Candidates ====
- Herman B. Gates, State Representative from Big Horn County
- W. G. Birkhauser

==== Results ====
Republican Primary results
Party	Candidate	Votes	%
Republican	Herman B. Gates	6,252	62.68%
Republican	W. G. Birkhauser,	3,723	37.32%
Total votes		9,975	100.00%

=== Progressive Party primary ===
==== Candidates ====
- F. S. Knittle

==== Results ====
Progressive Party primary results
Party	Candidate	Votes	%
Progressive	F. S. Knittle	330	100.00%
Total votes		330	100.00%

=== General election ===
==== Results ====
1914 Wyoming Treasurer election
Party	Candidate	Votes	%	±%
Republican	Herman B. Gates	19,202	46.89%	−0.54%
Democratic	F. L. Thompson	18,956	46.29%	−1.70%
Socialist	William Patterson	1,803	4.40%	−0.18%
Progressive	F. S. Knittle	991	2.42%	—
Majority		246	0.60%	+0.04%
Turnout		40,952	100.00%	
Republican hold				

== Superintendent of Public Instruction ==
Incumbent Democratic Superintendent of Public Instruction Rose Bird declined to seek re-election, creating an open seat. Uinta County Superintendent Iva T. Irish won the Democratic primary unopposed. Edith K. O. Clark, the Sheridan County Superintendent of Schools, narrowly won a crowded Republican primary, and advanced to the general election as Irish's chief opponent. Clark defeated Irish by a decisive margin, picking up the office for the Republican Party.

=== Democratic primary ===
==== Candidates ====
- Iva T. Irish, Uinta County Superintendent of Schools

==== Results ====
Democratic Party primary results
Party	Candidate	Votes	%
Democratic	Iva T. Irish	5,983	100.00%
Total votes		5,983	100.00%

=== Republican primary ===
==== Candidates ====
- Edith K. O. Clark, Sheridan County Superintendent of Schools
- Frances B. Smith, Carbon County Superintendent of Schools
- Thomas B. McDonough, Superintendent of Casper City Schools
- Frank W. Lee, Superintendent of Green River City Schools
- Jessie C. Liston, Principal of the Johnson School

==== Results ====
Republican Party primary results
Party	Candidate	Votes	%
Republican	Edith K. O. Clark	3,529	34.66%
Republican	Frances B. Smith	2,500	24.55%
Republican	Thomas B. McDonough	1,685	16.55%
Republican	Frank W. Lee	1,487	14.60%
Republican	Jessie C. Liston	981	9,63%
Total votes		10,182	100.00%

=== Progressive Party primary ===
==== Candidates ====
- Minnie Williams,

==== Results ====
Progressive Party primary results
Party	Candidate	Votes	%
Progressive	Minnie Williams	336	100.00%
Total votes		336	100.00%

=== General election ===
==== Results ====
1914 Wyoming Superintendent of Public Instruction election
Party	Candidate	Votes	%	±%
Republican	Edith K. O. Clark	20,631	50.14%	+4.27%
Democratic	Iva T. Irish	17,963	43.66%	−5.87%
Socialist	Robert Hanna	1,650	4.01%	−0.60%
Progressive	Minnie Williams	903	2.19%	—
Majority		2,668	6.48%	+2.83%
Turnout		41,147		
Republican gain from Democratic				
