= 1918 Wyoming state elections =

A general election was held in the U.S. state of Wyoming on Tuesday, November 5, 1918. All of the state's executive officers—the Governor, Secretary of State, Auditor, Treasurer, and Superintendent of Public Instruction—were up for election. Republicans won all statewide offices by wide margins, and with Robert D. Carey's defeat of Frank L. Houx, picked up the governorship following two consecutive losses to Democrats.

== Governor ==
Incumbent Democratic Governor Frank L. Houx, who ascended to the governorship following John B. Kendrick's election to the U.S. Senate in 1916, ran for re-election to a full term. He was opposed by Republican nominee Robert D. Carey, the Chairman of the State Highway Commission and the son of former Governor Joseph M. Carey, in the general election. Carey defeated Houx by a decisive margin.

1918 Wyoming gubernatorial election
Party	Candidate	Votes	%	±%
Republican	Robert D. Carey	23,825	56.11%	+11.90%
Democratic	Frank L. Houx (inc.)	18,640	43.89%	−7.72%
Majority		5,185	12.21	+4.80%
Turnout		42,465		
Republican gain from Democratic				

== Secretary of State ==
Incumbent Democratic Secretary of State Frank L. Houx, who served as acting Governor, opted to run for re-election as Governor rather than as Secretary of State. Maurice Groshon, the acting Chairman of the State Council for National Defense, won the Democratic primary unopposed, and faced Republican nominee William E. Chaplin, the former Register of the Cheyenne Land Office. Chaplin defeated Groshon by a wide margin to pick up the seat for the Republican Party.

=== Democratic primary ===
==== Candidates ====
- Maurice Groshon, Acting Chairman of the State Council for National Defense, former State Dairy, Food and Oil Commissioner

==== Results ====
Democratic Party primary results
Party	Candidate	Votes	%
Democratic	Maurice Groshon	6,409	100.00%
Total votes		6,409	100.00%

=== Republican primary ===
==== Candidates ====
- William E. Chaplin, former Register of the Cheyenne Land Office, former Mayor of Laramie

==== Results ====
Republican Primary results
Party	Candidate	Votes	%
Republican	Birney H. Sage	9,573	100.00%
Total votes		9,573	100.00%

=== General election ===
==== Results ====
1918 Wyoming Secretary of State election
Party	Candidate	Votes	%	±%
Republican	William E. Chaplin	22,507	56.39%	+9.64%
Democratic	Maurice Groshon	17,408	43.61%	−3.43%
Majority		5,099	12.77%	+12.48%
Turnout		39,915	100.00%	
Republican gain from Democratic				

== Auditor ==
Incumbent Republican State Auditor Robert B. Forsyth declined to run for re-election to a third term. State Senator Ishmael Jefferis won the Republican primary unopposed, and faced Casper insurance salesman Albert H. Stewart, who defeated Deputy Secretary of State Frank H. Westcott in the Democratic primary. Jefferis defeated Stewart by a wide margin.

=== Democratic primary ===
==== Candidates ====
- Albert H. Stewart, Casper insurance salesman
- Frank H. Westcott, Deputy Secretary of State

==== Results ====
Democratic Party primary results
Party	Candidate	Votes	%
Democratic	Albert H. Stewart	3,944	59.40%
Democratic	Frank H. Westcott	2,696	40.60%
Total votes		6,640	100.00%

=== Republican primary ===
==== Candidates ====
- Ishmael C. Jefferis, State Senator from Weston County

==== Results ====
Republican Primary results
Party	Candidate	Votes	%
Republican	Ishmael C. Jefferis	11,629	100.00%
Total votes		11,629	100.00%

=== General election ===
==== Results ====
1918 Wyoming Auditor election
Party	Candidate	Votes	%	±%
Republican	Ishmael C. Jefferis	22,146	56.27%	+4.87%
Democratic	Albert H. Stewart	17,208	43.73%	+2.08%
Majority		4,938	12.55%	+2.79%
Turnout		39,354	100.00%	
Republican hold				

== Treasurer ==
Incumbent Republican State Treasurer Henry B. Gates was unable to seek a second consecutive term, thereby creating an open seat. Former State Senator A. D. Hoskins narrowly defeated George W. Perry, a banker and the former Chief Clerk of the State Senate, in the Republican primary. In the general election, he faced former State Representative John L. Jordan, whom he handily defeated to win election as Treasurer.

=== Democratic primary ===
==== Candidates ====
- John L. Jordon, former State Representative from Laramie County

==== Results ====
Democratic Party primary results
Party	Candidate	Votes	%
Democratic	John L. Jordon	6,399	100.00%
Total votes		6,399	100.00%

=== Republican primary ===
==== Candidates ====
- A. D. Hoskins, former State Senator from Uinta County
- George W. Perry, Sheridan banker, former Chief Clerk of the State Senate

==== Results ====
Republican Primary results
Party	Candidate	Votes	%
Republican	A. D. Hoskins	6,551	51.30%
Republican	George W. Perry	6,218	48.70%
Total votes		12,769	100.00%

=== General election ===
==== Results ====
1918 Wyoming Treasurer election
Party	Candidate	Votes	%	±%
Republican	A. D. Hoskins	21,840	55.45%	+8.56%
Democratic	John L. Jordan	17,545	44.55%	−1.74%
Majority		4,295	10.91%	+0.04%
Turnout		39,385	100.00%	
Republican hold				

== Superintendent of Public Instruction ==
Incumbent Republican Superintendent of Public Instruction Edith K. O. Clark declined to seek re-election, creating an open seat. Katharine A. Morton, the former State Librarian, won a plurality of the vote in the Republican primary and advanced to the general election. No Democratic candidate initially filed to run for Superintendent, but Laramie County Superintendent of Schools Mamie Hefferon won the Democratic nomination as a write-in candidate. In the general election, Morton only defeated Hefferon by a narrow margin, holding the office for the Republican Party.

=== Democratic primary ===
No Democratic candidates filed for Superintendent, but Laramie County Superintendent of Schools Mamie Hefferon announced that she would run as a write-in candidate for the nomination one week before the primary. After Hefferon received 600 write-in votes in the Democratic primary, she received the nomination and proceeded to the general election.

=== Republican primary ===
==== Candidates ====
- Katharine A. Morton, former State Librarian
- Lenore C. Harnsberger, Republican activist
- Thomas B. McDonough, Deputy State Superintendent, 1914 Republican candidate for Superintendent

==== Results ====
Republican Party primary results
Party	Candidate	Votes	%
Republican	Katharine A. Morton	5,887	43.86%
Republican	Lenore C. Harnsberger	4,037	30.08%
Republican	Thomas B. McDonough	3,498	26.06%
Total votes		13,422	100.00%

=== General election ===
==== Results ====
1918 Wyoming Superintendent of Public Instruction election
Party	Candidate	Votes	%	±%
Republican	Katharine A. Morton	20,711	51.58%	+1.44%
Democratic	Mamie E. Hefferon	19,446	48.42%	+4.77%
Majority		1,265	3.15%	−3.33%
Turnout		40,157		
Republican hold				
