= 1922 Wyoming state elections =

A general election was held in the U.S. state of Wyoming on Tuesday, November 7, 1922. All of the state's executive officers—the Governor, Secretary of State, Auditor, Treasurer, and Superintendent of Public Instruction—were up for election. Democrats improved considerably from their performances in 1918, with William B. Ross winning the gubernatorial election and almost all of their statewide candidates outpacing their 1918 nominees. However, Republicans held all of the other statewide offices.

== Governor ==
Incumbent Republican Governor Robert D. Carey ran for re-election to a second term. However, he was defeated in the Republican primary by banker Frank Hay. In the general election, William B. Ross, the Democratic nominee and the former Laramie County Attorney, narrowly defeated Hay. However, Ross would not serve a full term as Governor; he died on October 2, 1924, triggering a special election the next month, which his wife, Nellie Tayloe Ross, won.

1922 Wyoming gubernatorial election
Party	Candidate	Votes	%	±%
Democratic	William B. Ross	31,110	50.59%	+6.69%
Republican	John W. Hay	30,387	49.41%	−6.69%
Majority		723	1.18%	−11.03%
Turnout		61,497		
Democratic gain from Republican				

== Secretary of State ==
Incumbent Republican Secretary of State William E. Chaplin opted to not seek re-election, and instead managed Congressman Frank W. Mondell's unsuccessful campaign for the U.S. Senate. A crowded Republican primary developed to replace him, with State Senator Frank E. Lucas, L. Curtis Hinkle, and State Treasurer A. D. Hoskins all running. The primary was quite close, and Lucas was not declared the winner over Hinkle for several weeks. In the general election, Lucas faced Cheyenne Mayor Edwin P. Taylor, the Democratic nominee. Following a close campaign, Lucas narrowly defeated Taylor to win election as Secretary of State. During Lucas's term, Governor Ross would die in office, temporarily (and briefly) elevating Lucas to the governorship.

=== Democratic primary ===
==== Candidates ====
- Edwin P. Taylor, Mayor of Cheyenne

==== Results ====
Democratic Party primary results
Party	Candidate	Votes	%
Democratic	Edwin P. Taylor	10,219	100.00%
Total votes		10,219	100.00%

=== Republican primary ===
==== Candidates ====
- Frank E. Lucas, State Senator from Johnson County
- L. Curtis Hinkle, Deputy Secretary of State, former State Representative from Laramie County
- A. D. Hoskins, Wyoming State Treasurer

==== Results ====
Republican Primary results
Party	Candidate	Votes	%
Republican	Frank E. Lucas	9,439	34.76%
Republican	L. Curtis Hinkle	9,123	33.60%
Republican	A. D. Hoskins	8,589	31.63%
Total votes		22,825	100.00%

=== General election ===
==== Results ====
1922 Wyoming Secretary of State election
Party	Candidate	Votes	%	±%
Republican	Frank E. Lucas	30,698	53.35%	−3.03%
Democratic	Edwin P. Taylor	26,839	46.65%	+3.03%
Majority		3,859	6.71%	−6.07%
Turnout		57,537	100.00%	
Republican hold				

== Auditor ==
Incumbent State Auditor I. C. Jefferis, a Republican first elected in 1918, ran for re-election to a second term. He faced a strong challenge in the Republican primary from Deputy Attorney General Vincent Carter, and narrowly lost renomination to Carter. In the general election, he faced G. H. Little, the Democratic nominee, and defeated him by a narrow margin to win his first of two terms as State Auditor.

=== Democratic primary ===
==== Candidates ====
- G. H. Little

==== Results ====
Democratic Party primary results
Party	Candidate	Votes	%
Democratic	L. H. Little	8,243	100.00%
Total votes		8,243	100.00%

=== Republican primary ===
==== Candidates ====
- Vincent Carter, Deputy State Attorney General
- I. C. Jefferis, incumbent State Auditor

==== Results ====
Republican Primary results
Party	Candidate	Votes	%
Republican	Vincent Carter	12,060	54.89%
Republican	I. C. Jefferis (inc.)	9,911	45.11%
Total votes		21,971	100.00%

=== General election ===
==== Results ====
1922 Wyoming Auditor election
Party	Candidate	Votes	%	±%
Republican	Vincent Carter	29,807	52.76%	−3.52%
Democratic	L. H. Little	26,691	47.24%	+3.52%
Majority		3,116	5.52%	−7.03%
Turnout		56,498	100.00%	
Republican hold				

== Treasurer ==
Incumbent Republican State Treasurer A. D. Hoskins was unable to seek re-election due to term limits, and instead waged an unsuccessful campaign for Secretary of State. State Highway Commissioner John M. Snyder emerged as the Republican nominee, and faced former Sheridan City Commissioner Harry A. Loucks in the general election. Snyder, like most other statewide Republican candidates, ended up narrowly defeating Loucks.

=== Democratic primary ===
==== Candidates ====
- Harry A. Loucks, former Sheridan City Commissioner

==== Results ====
Democratic Party primary results
Party	Candidate	Votes	%
Democratic	Harry A. Loucks	9,852	100.00%
Total votes		9,852	100.00%

=== Republican primary ===
==== Candidates ====
- John M. Snyder, State Highway Commissioner
- Jesse Crosby

==== Results ====
Republican Primary results
Party	Candidate	Votes	%
Republican	John M. Snyder	13,796	61.22%
Republican	Jesse Crosby	8,740	38.78%
Total votes		22,536	100.00%

=== General election ===
==== Results ====
1922 Wyoming Treasurer election
Party	Candidate	Votes	%	±%
Republican	John M. Snyder	30,134	52.86%	−2.60%
Democratic	Harry A. Loucks	26,877	47.14%	+2.60%
Majority		3,257	5.71%	−5.19%
Turnout		57,011	100.00%	
Republican hold				

== Superintendent of Public Instruction ==
Incumbent Republican Superintendent of Public Instruction Katharine A. Morton ran for re-election to a second term. She was challenged in the Republican primary by Mrs. Cyrus Beard, the former Superintendent of Schools for the city of Evanston. Morton defeated Beard by a wide margin and advanced to the general election, where she was opposed by the Democratic nominee, teacher Cecilia H. Hendricks. Unlike every other Republican candidate, Morton won her race in a landslide, improving on her performance from 1918.

=== Democratic primary ===
==== Candidates ====
- Cecilia H. Hendricks, teacher

==== Results ====
Democratic Party primary results
Party	Candidate	Votes	%
Democratic	Cecilia H. Hendricks	9,846	100.00%
Total votes		9.846	100.00%

=== Republican primary ===
==== Candidates ====
- Katharine A. Morton, incumbent Superintendent of Instruction
- Mrs. Cyrus Beard, former Superintendent of Evanston Schools

==== Results ====
Republican Party primary results
Party	Candidate	Votes	%
Republican	Katharine Morton (inc.)	14,299	59.59%
Republican	Mrs. Cyrus Beard	9,698	40.41%
Total votes		23,997	100.00%

=== General election ===
==== Results ====
1922 Wyoming Superintendent of Public Instruction election
Party	Candidate	Votes	%	±%
Republican	Katharine A. Morton (inc.)	33,041	57.16%	+5.59%
Democratic	Cecilia H. Hendricks	24,759	42.84%	−5.59%
Majority		8,282	14.33%	+11.18%
Turnout		57,800		
Republican hold				
