= 1918 Wyoming gubernatorial election =

- November 5, 1918
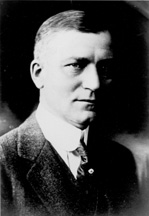

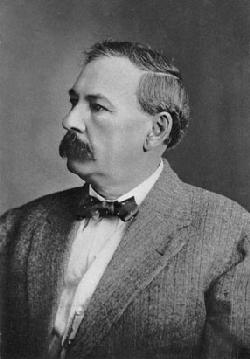
Nominee	Robert D. Carey	Frank L. Houx
Party	Republican	Democratic
Popular vote	23,825	18,640
Percentage	56.11%	43.90%
- County results Carey: 50–60% 60–70% Houx: 50–60%
Governor before election
Frank L. Houx
Democratic
Elected Governor
Robert D. Carey
Republican

The 1918 Wyoming gubernatorial election took place on November 5, 1918. Following the election of Governor John B. Kendrick to the U.S. Senate in 1916, Secretary of State Frank L. Houx served as acting Governor. He ran for re-election and faced a stiff challenge in the Democratic primary from attorney William B. Ross. After defeating Ross by a decisive margin, he faced Robert D. Carey, the Republican nominee and the son of former Democratic Governor Joseph M. Carey. However, despite Houx's past electoral success, he faced difficult headwinds as Democratic candidates did poorly across the country in 1918. He ended up losing re-election to Carey by a wide margin.

== Democratic primary ==
=== Candidates ===
- Frank L. Houx, incumbent Governor
- William B. Ross, attorney, 1910 Democratic nominee for Congress, former Laramie County Attorney

=== Results ===
Democratic primary
Party	Candidate	Votes	%
Democratic	Frank L. Houx (inc.)	4,393	56.91%
Democratic	William B. Ross	3,326	43.09%
Total votes		7,719	100.00%

== Republican primary ==
=== Candidates ===
- Robert D. Carey, Chairman of the State Highway Commission, former Converse County Commissioner
- M. B. Camplin, Mayor of Sheridan
- Leonidas R. A. Condit, former State Representative from Johnson County

=== Results ===
Republican primary
Party	Candidate	Votes	%
Republican	Robert D. Carey	8,404	57.61%
Republican	M. B. Camplin	3,874	26.56%
Republican	Leonidas R. Condit	2,309	15.83%
Total votes		14,587	100.00%

== Results ==
1918 Wyoming gubernatorial election
Party	Candidate	Votes	%	±%
Republican	Robert D. Carey	23,825	56.11%	+11.90%
Democratic	Frank L. Houx (inc.)	18,640	43.89%	−7.72%
Majority		5,185	12.21	+4.80%
Turnout		42,465		
Republican gain from Democratic				
