= Governor Gore =

Governor Gore may refer to:

- Christopher Gore (1758–1827), 8th Governor of Massachusetts
- Francis Gore (1769–1852), Governor of Bermuda from 1805 to 1806
- Howard Mason Gore (1877–1947), 17th Governor of West Virginia
- Robert Hayes Gore (1886–1972), Governor of Puerto Rico from 1933 to 1934
