= 1928 United States Senate election in Wyoming =

- November 6, 1928
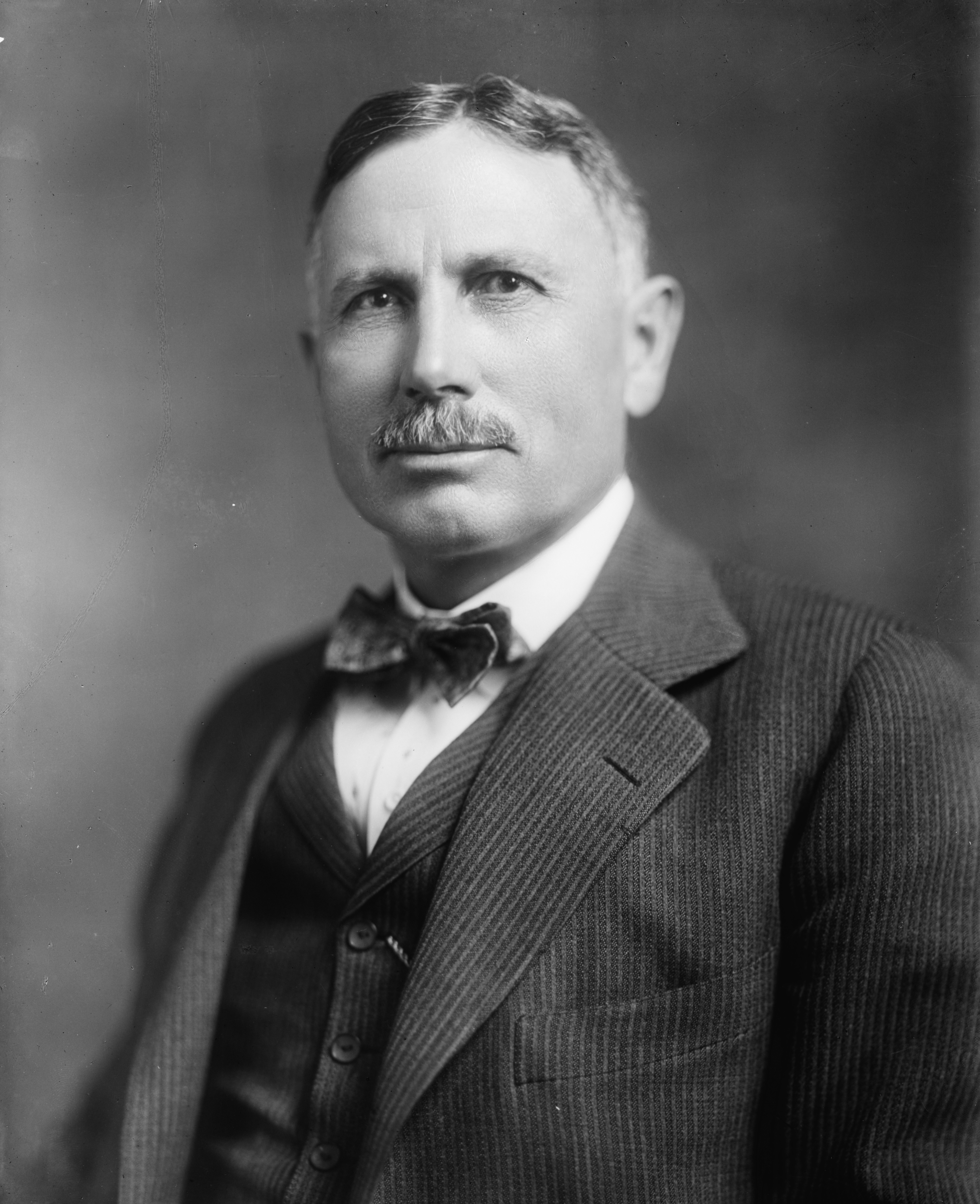

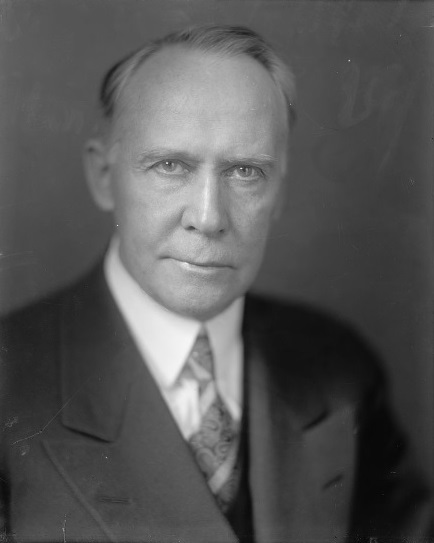
Nominee	John B. Kendrick	Charles E. Winter
Party	Democratic	Republican
Popular vote	43,032	37,076
Percentage	53.50%	46.09%
- County results Kendrick: 40–50% 50–60% 60–70% 70–80% Winter: 50–60% 60–70%
U.S. senator before election
John B. Kendrick
Democratic
Elected U.S. Senator
John B. Kendrick
Democratic

The 1928 United States Senate election in Wyoming took place on November 6, 1928. Democratic Senator John B. Kendrick ran for re-election to a third term. He faced Republican Congressman Charles E. Winter in the general election, and a competitive general election ensued. Kendrick ended up winning re-election by a narrow margin, with Winters's campaign likely assisted by the strong performance of Herbert Hoover in that year's presidential election. Kendrick's third term would turn out to be his last; he died while in office on November 3, 1933, about a year until the seat would next be up. Joseph C. O'Mahoney was appointed to serve out the remainder of Kendrick's term and would end up winning the ensuing election in 1934.

== Democratic primary ==
=== Candidates ===
- John B. Kendrick, incumbent U.S. Senator

=== Results ===
Democratic primary
Party	Candidate	Votes	%
Democratic	John B. Kendrick (inc.)	12,445	100.00%
Total votes		12,445	100.00%

== Republican primary ==
=== Candidates ===
- Charles E. Winter, U.S. Congressman from Wyoming's at-large congressional district

=== Results ===
Republican primary
Party	Candidate	Votes	%
Republican	Charles E. Winter	30,225	100.00%
Total votes		30,225	100.00%

== General election ==
=== Results ===
1928 United States Senate election in Wyoming
Party	Candidate	Votes	%	±%
Democratic	John B. Kendrick (inc.)	43,032	53.50%	−3.81%
Republican	Charles E. Winter	37,076	46.09%	+3.39%
Socialist	W. W. Wolfe	333	0.41%	—
Majority		5,956	7.40%	−7.20%
Turnout		80,441		
Democratic hold				
