= 1934 United States Senate elections in Wyoming =

- November 6, 1934
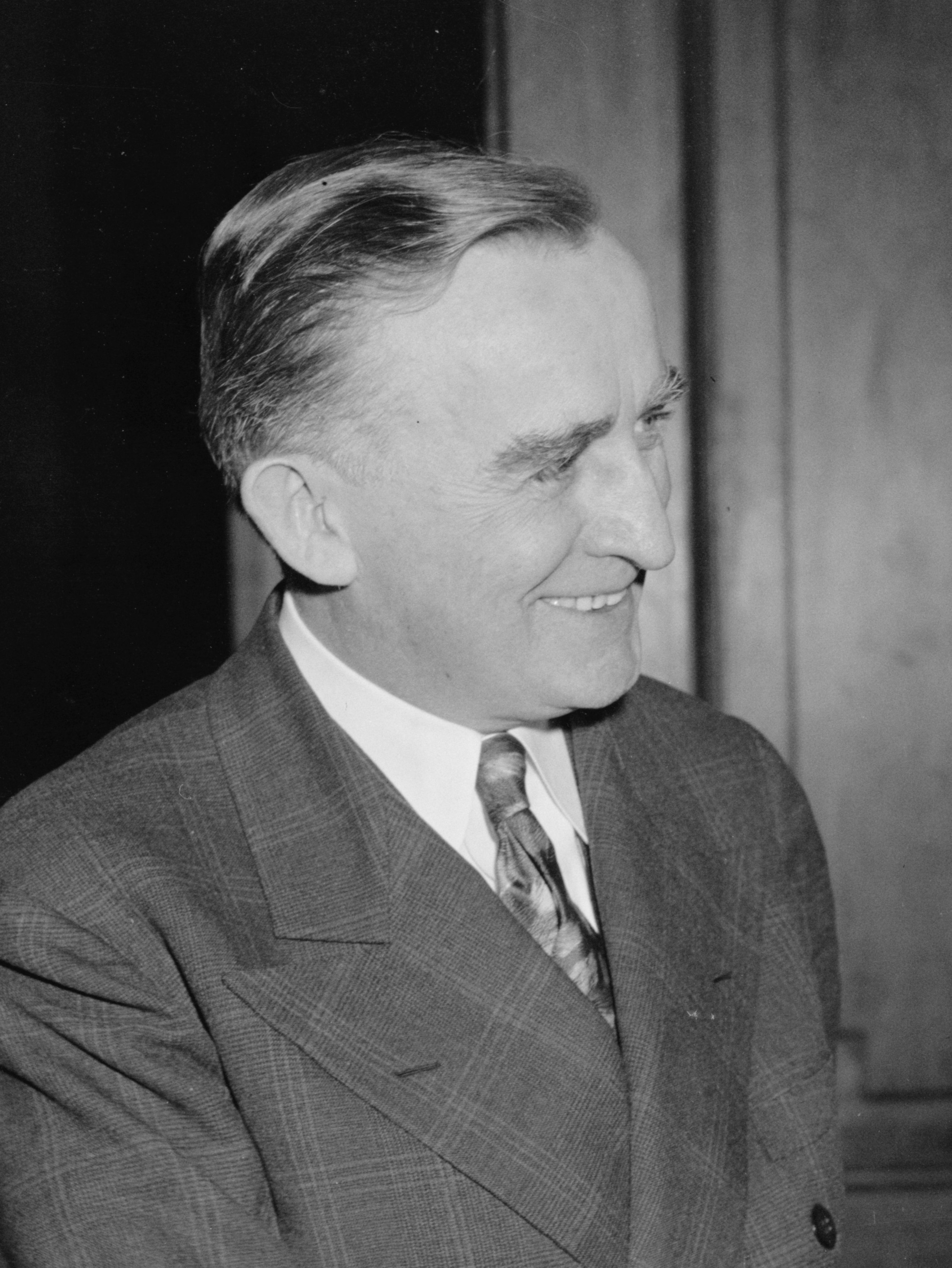

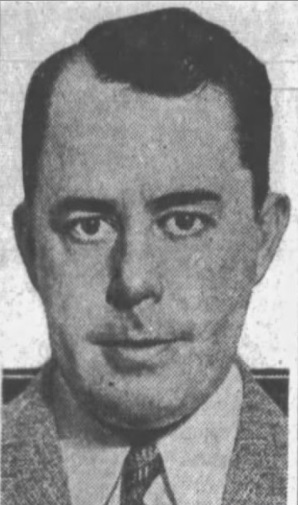
Nominee	Joseph C. O'Mahoney	Vincent Carter
Party	Democratic	Republican
Popular vote	53,806	40,819
Percentage	56.62%	42.96%
- County results O'Mahoney: 50–60% 60–70% Carter: 50–60% 60–70%
U.S. senator before election
Joseph C. O'Mahoney
Democratic
Elected U.S. Senator
Joseph C. O'Mahoney
Democratic

The 1934 United States Senate elections in Wyoming took place on November 6, 1934. Incumbent Democratic Senator John B. Kendrick died on November 3, 1933, and Joseph C. O'Mahoney was appointed by Governor Leslie A. Miller as Kendrick's replacement. Two elections for the same Senate seat were held on the same day; one as a special election to fill the remainder of Kendrick's original six-year term, and another to select a Senator to serve the next six-year term. O'Mahoney ran for re-election in both elections. He was opposed by Republican Congressman Vincent Carter. Aided by the strong performance by the Democratic Party throughout the country in 1934, and by Governor Miller's landslide re-election, O'Mahoney handily defeated Carter to win re-election.

== Democratic primary ==
=== Candidates ===
- Joseph C. O'Mahoney, incumbent U.S. Senator

=== Results ===
==== Regular election ====
Democratic primary
Party	Candidate	Votes	%
Democratic	Joseph C. O'Mahoney (inc.)	25,012	100.00%
Total votes		25,012	100.00%

==== Special election ====
Special Democratic primary
Party	Candidate	Votes	%
Democratic	Joseph C. O'Mahoney (inc.)	25,088	100.00%
Total votes		25,088	100.00%

== Republican primary ==
=== Candidates ===
- Vincent Carter, U.S. Congressman from Wyoming's at-large congressional district
- J. Elmer Brock, vice-president of the Wyoming Stock Growers Association
- Harry P. Ilsley, Judge on the Seventh Judicial District of Wyoming (only filed for the regular election)
- M. A. Underwood, rancher (only filed for the regular election)

==== Dropped out ====
- Charles E. Winter, former U.S. Congressman from Wyoming's at-large congressional district (running for Congress)

=== Results ===
==== Regular election ====
Republican primary
Party	Candidate	Votes	%
Republican	Vincent Carter	19,842	57.58%
Republican	J. Elmer Brock	6,844	19.86%
Republican	Harry P. Ilsley	6,683	19.39%
Republican	M. A. Underwood	1,093	3.17%
Total votes		34,462	100.00%

==== Special election ====
Special Republican primary
Party	Candidate	Votes	%
Republican	Vincent Carter	23,112	70.38%
Republican	J. Elmer Brock	9,728	29.62%
Total votes		32,840	100.00%

== General election ==
=== Results ===
==== Regular election ====
1934 United States Senate election in Wyoming
Party	Candidate	Votes	%	±%
Democratic	Joseph C. O'Mahoney (inc.)	53,806	56.62%	+3.13%
Republican	Vincent Carter	40,819	42.96%	−3.14%
Socialist	Joseph N. Lunn	401	0.42%	+0.01%
Majority		12,987	13.67%	+6.26%
Turnout		95,026		
Democratic hold				

==== Special election ====
1934 United States Senate special election in Wyoming
Party	Candidate	Votes	%	±%
Democratic	Joseph C. O'Mahoney (inc.)	53,859	56.88%	+3.39%
Republican	Vincent Carter	40,825	43.12%	−2.97%
Majority		13,034	13.77%	+6.36%
Turnout		94,684		
Democratic hold				
