= José E. Colom =

Puerto Rican politician

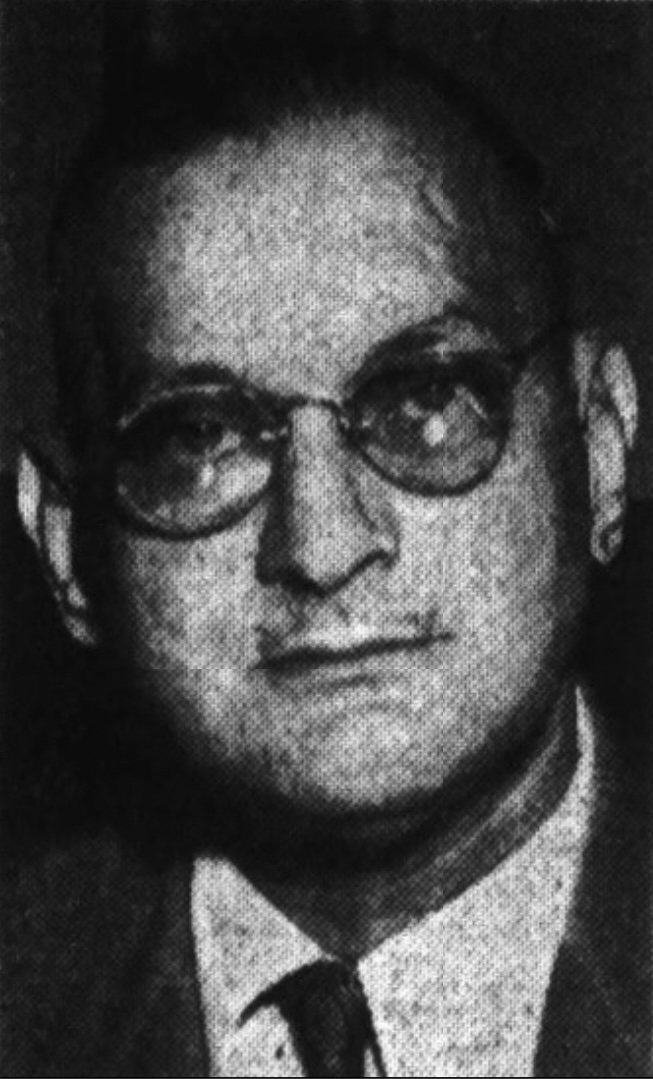
- Colom, c. 1950

Acting Governor of Puerto Rico
- In office 12 May 1939 – 11 September 1939
- Preceded by: Blanton Winship
- Succeeded by: William D. Leahy

Personal details
- Born: 5 February 1889 Ponce, Puerto Rico, New Spain
- Died: 16 November 1973 (aged 84) Hato Rey, Puerto Rico
- Education: University of Pennsylvania (BEng)

Military service
- Allegiance: United States
- Branch/service: United States Army
- Rank: Colonel
- Unit: Army National Guard • 296th Infantry Regiment

José Enrique Colom Martínez (5 February 1889 – c. 1960) was acting governor of Puerto Rico between 25 June 1939 and 11 September 1939 after the previous governor, Blanton C. Winship, was removed from office by President Franklin D. Roosevelt for abuse of his authority in depriving the people of Puerto Rico of their civil rights.

== Military career ==
Colom was born in the municipality of Ponce on 5 February 1889.

In 1912, Colom graduated from the University of Pennsylvania as a civil engineer. Upon his return to Puerto Rico, he began employment in this field, continuing this as his civil job for the following decades. As an engineer, Colom participated in project commissioned by the Departamento de Obras Públicas and a number of colonial governors, receiving funds from the former or the insular legislature.

Colom began his military career on February 28, 1929. He served in the Puerto Rico National Guard, reaching the rank of infantry captain in 1917. In 1923, he was ascended to the rank of commander, which he would retain during the following five years. On 1 July 1928, Colom was ascended to the rank of lieutenant colonel. On 15 October 1940, Colom was activated by the United States Army and assigned command of the 296th Regiment of Infantry. As a consequence, he abandoned his civil job. Colom was reassigned to command Campamento Tortuguero, where he supervised the first special training assigned to the PRNG. Afterwards, he joined the government in other functions. He died in Hato Rey. He was buried at the Puerto Rico National Cemetery in Bayamón, Puerto Rico.

== Sources ==
- Norat, José Angel (27 March 1987). Historia y Tradiciones: Guardia Nacional de Puerto Rico – Cinco Centurias... En Guardia. Esmaco Printers.

Political offices
| Preceded by Blanton Winship | Governor of Puerto Rico; Acting; 1939 | Succeeded by William D. Leahy |
