= James R. Beverley =

American politician (1894–1967)

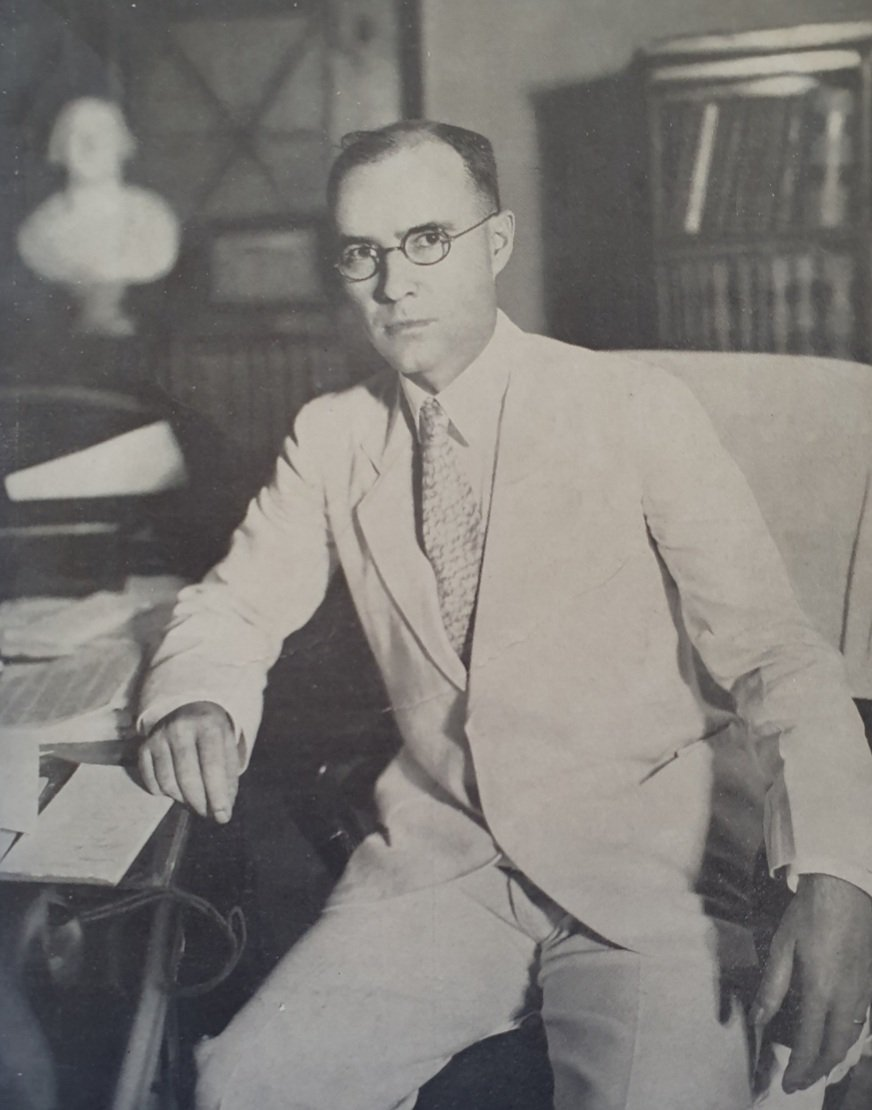
- Beverly, c. 1930

Governor of Puerto Rico
- In office January 1932 – July 3, 1933
- President: Herbert Hoover; Franklin D. Roosevelt
- Preceded by: Theodore Roosevelt Jr.
- Succeeded by: Robert Hayes Gore
- In office August 1929 – September 9, 1929 (acting)
- President: Herbert Hoover
- Preceded by: Horace Mann Towner
- Succeeded by: Theodore Roosevelt Jr.

Attorney-General of Puerto Rico
- In office 1928–1932
- Governor: Horace M. Towner
- Preceded by: George C. Butte
- Succeeded by: Charles E. Winter

Personal details
- Born: James Rumsey Beverley; June 15, 1894 Amarillo, Texas
- Died: June 17, 1967 (aged 73) Austin, Texas
- Party: Republican
- Spouse: Mary Jarmon
- Education: University of Texas
- Profession: Lawyer, politician

James Rumsey Beverley (June 15, 1894 – June 17, 1967) was an American lawyer and politician, appointed as attorney general of Puerto Rico, serving 1927 to 1932. During this period, he was appointed as acting governor of Puerto Rico in 1929 and in January 1932, he was appointed governor by President Herbert Hoover and served through 1933. He was the only non-Puerto Rican appointee of 15 from 1900 to 1952 who could speak Spanish before going there.

== Early and personal life ==
Beverley was born in Amarillo, Texas to William and Clara (Hendricks) Beverley. He attended local schools and went to college at the University of Texas in Austin. He served in the United States Army during World War I as an artillery officer, serving in France. After completing law school at the University of Texas and starting work as a lawyer, he married Mary Smith Jarmon in 1925.

== Attorney and political career ==
Beverley was active in Republican Party politics in Texas. Beverley was appointed as Assistant Attorney General of Puerto Rico in 1925, serving until 1927.

Beverley spoke Spanish as a second language. In 1927, he was appointed as Attorney General of Puerto Rico, serving until 1932. When appointed as governor of Puerto Rico for periods in 1929 and 1932-1933, he was the only one of fifteen non-Puerto Ricans to serve in that position between 1900 and 1952 who already spoke Spanish. He became close friends with Theodore Roosevelt Jr., who followed him in 1930 as governor, serving until 1932. The two men had a close relationship for the rest of their lives.

In Beverley's tenures as governor, he had to deal with a major hurricane in which several people died and there was extensive damage. He also managed through the end of Prohibition on the island.

In 1932, during his second period of governor, he provoked controversy by recommending the use of birth control. American Catholics were much more disturbed by this and raised many objections than did Puerto Ricans, who mostly ignored his comments. Soon after taking office, he had to deal with agitation resulting from charges made by Pedro Albizu Campos, president of the Nationalist Party, that Cornelius Rhoads, an American medical researcher with the Rockefeller Foundation, had been working on a United States plot to exterminate Puerto Ricans, based on Rhoads' own letter that became public. He ordered an investigation by the Attorney General José Ramón Quiñones, who found no evidence of wrongdoing by Rhoads of the American health project.

On August 11, 1931, Beverley was one of seven people, including five officials, on board a chartered Pan American Airways Sikorsky seaplane flight tour of Puerto Rico, including the wife of then-Governor Teddy Roosevelt. The plane sank on landing, but no one suffered any injuries. The people were all taken off by boats.

Following his service as governor, Beverley continued to live and work in Puerto Rico as the head of a large firm. He practiced law and served on numerous commissions and was active in the US Coast Guard reserve, helping lead efforts to protect Puerto Rican waters during World War II.

In the 1960s Beverley returned to Austin, Texas. He lived there until his death in 1967, two days after turning 73.

== Legacy and honors ==
- His papers are held by the University of Texas.

Preceded by Horace Mann Towner	Governor of Puerto Rico; August 1929 - September 9, 1929 (Acting)	Succeeded by Theodore Roosevelt Jr.
Preceded by Theodore Roosevelt Jr.	Governor of Puerto Rico; January 1932 – July 3, 1933	Succeeded by Robert Hayes Gore
Preceded by George C. Butte	Attorney General of Puerto Rico; 1928-1932	Succeeded by Charles E. Winter
