= 1922 United States Senate election in Wyoming =

- November 7, 1922
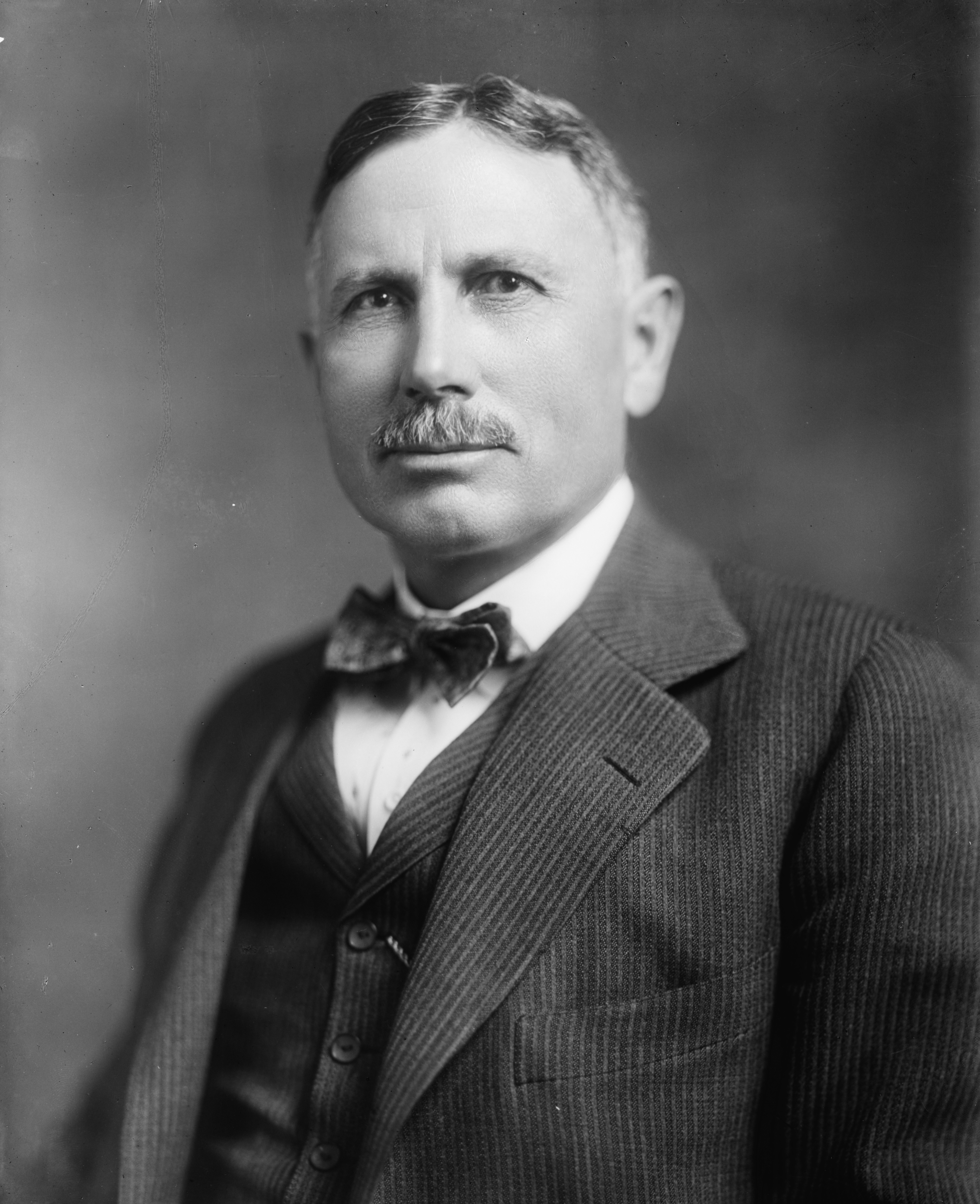

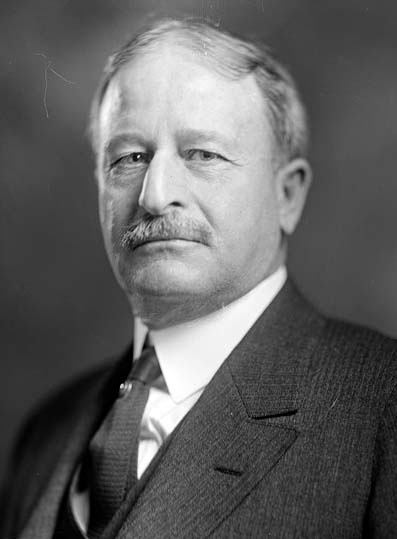
Nominee	John B. Kendrick	Frank W. Mondell
Party	Democratic	Republican
Popular vote	35,734	26,627
Percentage	57.30%	42.70%
- County results Kendrick: 50–60% 60–70% Mondell: 50–60%
U.S. senator before election
John B. Kendrick
Democratic
Elected U.S. Senator
John B. Kendrick
Democratic

The 1922 United States Senate election in Wyoming took place on November 7, 1922. First-term Democratic Senator John B. Kendrick ran for re-election to a second term. He was opposed by Republican Congressman Frank W. Mondell, the Majority Leader of the U.S. House of Representatives. Kendrick won re-election by a wide margin, defeating Mondell, despite his long record of representing the state in Congress, with 57% of the vote to Mondell's 43%. Kendrick was also able to increase his margin of victory from 1916, despite Republicans generally doing well in Wyoming in 1922.

== Democratic primary ==
=== Candidates ===
- John B. Kendrick, incumbent U.S. Senator

=== Results ===
Democratic primary
Party	Candidate	Votes	%
Democratic	John B. Kendrick (inc.)	12,782	100.00%
Total votes		12,682	100.00%

== Republican primary ==
=== Candidates ===
- Frank W. Mondell, U.S. Congressman from Wyoming's at-large congressional district

=== Results ===
Republican primary
Party	Candidate	Votes	%
Republican	Frank W. Mondell	25,055	100.00%
Total votes		25,055	100.00%

== General election ==
=== Results ===
1922 United States Senate election in Wyoming
Party	Candidate	Votes	%	±%
Democratic	John B. Kendrick (inc.)	35,734	57.30%	+5.83%
Republican	Frank W. Mondell	26,627	42.70%	−2.77%
Majority		9,107	14.60%	+8.61%
Turnout		62,361		
Democratic hold				
