= Trail End =

Historic house in Wyoming, United States

- U.S. National Register of Historic Places
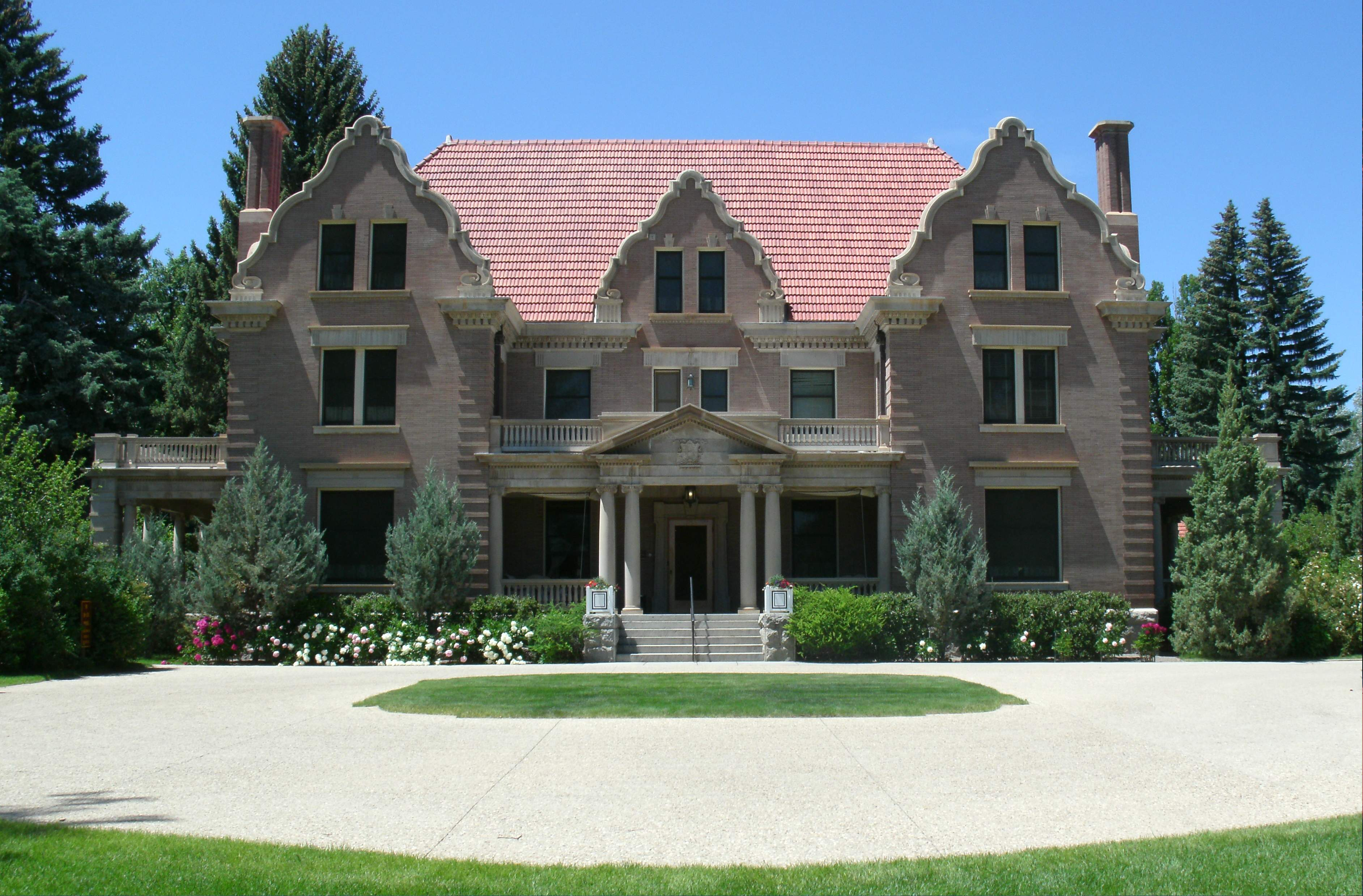

- Location within Wyoming Location within the United States
- Location: 400 Claredon Ave., Sheridan, Wyoming
- Coordinates: 44°48′5″N 106°57′58″W
- Area: 1 acre (0.40 ha)
- Built: 1908–13
- Architect: MacAlister, William
- Architectural style: Flemish Revival
- NRHP reference No.: 70000675
- Added to NRHP: February 26, 1970

Trail End, also known as the John B. Kendrick Mansion, is a historic home located at 400 Clarendon Avenue in Sheridan, Wyoming. The home was built and inhabited by Wyoming governor and U.S. Senator John B. Kendrick. Built from 1908 to 1913, the house was designed by Glenn Charles MacAlister and cost $164,000. The interiors were designed by New York City architect D. Everett Waid. Kendrick was a cattleman when he commissioned the house, and he was only beginning his political career; once he became governor in 1914 and a senator three years later, Trail End became his summer home. The house is typical of homes built by prosperous Wyoming cattlemen in the early 20th century. It was added to the National Register of Historic Places on February 26, 1970.

The home is 13,748 square feet in size. It is one of the few examples of Flemish Revival architecture in Wyoming. Because the Carriage House was completed before the main mansion, the Kendrick family lived there for three years until the main house was ready for occupancy in July 1913.

The Sheridan County Historical Society purchased Trail End in 1969, saving it from threatened destruction and subsequently opening it to the public as a community museum. The state took over ownership in 1982.

== See also ==
- Wyoming Historical Landmarks
- List of the oldest buildings in Wyoming
