= Knottsville, Kentucky =

Unincorporated community in Kentucky, United States

- Census-designated place
- Location within Kentucky
- Coordinates: 37°46′18″N 86°54′15″W
- Country: United States
- State: Kentucky
- County: Daviess
- Established: 1836
- Founder: Leonard Knott

Area
  - Total: 0.70 sq mi (1.81 km^{2})
  - Land: 0.69 sq mi (1.79 km^{2})
  - Water: 0.0039 sq mi (0.01 km^{2})
- Elevation: 568 ft (173 m)

Population (2020)
  - Total: 183
  - Density: 264.3/sq mi (102.06/km^{2})
- Time zone: UTC-6 (Central (CST))
  - Summer (DST): UTC-5 (CDT)
- ZIP code: 42366
- Area code: 270
- GNIS feature ID: 497423

Knottsville is a small unincorporated community and census-designated place (CDP) in eastern Daviess County, Kentucky. The population was 183 as of the 2020 census. The first house was built by Leonard Knott in the fall of 1827, for which the town was named. It was laid out in 1836 by William R. Griffith and James Millay.

== Demographics ==
Historical population
Census	Pop.	Note	%±
2020	183		—
U.S. Decennial Census

== Settlement ==
Leonard Knott was born in Nelson Co., Kentucky, as the son of James Knott and his wife. As a young man he moved to Daviess County, where he lived for a year in a small cabin on the Whitesville Road, and built in present-day Knottsville in 1827.

He married Mary M. Drury, by whom he had four children, James I., Mary E., Margaret A., and Mary E. The youngest daughter married John Haynes and lived in this precinct. Margaret married twice, first to John Melton, who died, and the next time to J.M. Hayden.

Knott was a lifelong Catholic and died in 1854. His descendants lived in the area for generations.

== Early times ==
James Millay opened the first store. The town was officially named 'Knottsville' by Hon. Wm. R. Griffith while he was in the legislature, and it was laid out in 1836. The 1847 the Kentucky State Register placed two physicians in Knottsville. The first resident physician was Dr. Richard Lockhart.

The first school-house was built in 1854. It was a log cabin but was replaced by a neat frame building in 1857. The first school was taught by Powhattan Ellis, whose family came from Virginia. By the end of the 19th century, the town had two general stores, one drug store, one shoe shop, a blacksmith and wagon shop, two undertakers, one flouring mill, one saw and grist mill, and three tobacco factories.

St. William Catholic Church of Knottsville had the first public circulating library in Daviess County.

== Religion ==
The early Catholic missionaries to the area were Fathers Charles Nerinx, Elisha J. Durbin, and Robert Abel. The first resident pastor was Fr. John Wathen in 1833. Many residents of Knottsville were a part of St. Lawrence Church until 1887. By that time the Knottsville area had grown to over 1000 people. Rev. Msgr. Thomas F. Gambon, Vicar General of the Diocese of Louisville, and Father John Sheridan, Dr. Drury, J.B. and H.T. Aud and W.S. Hazel, met to discuss the growing Catholic presence and the overcrowding at St. Lawrence Church. At this meeting, the Parish was divided. The area around St. Lawrence was incorporated into that parish and the new St. William congregation was founded on May 2, 1887.

The first pastor of St. William was Father James P. Cronin. He rented an old bar room located on the site where the present brick church office stands next to St. William Church, and celebrated the first mass in the parish there. Fr. Cronin lived in a house which adjoined the temporary church.

Adjoining lots were purchased and the foundation of the present brick church was laid in the fall of 1887. On May 27, 1888, the corner stone was laid by Right Reverend Bishop McCloskey. As the parish grew, the Women's Altar Society, Women's Guild, and Total Abstinence Society were organized. The Church was consecrated on May 30, 1898, by Bishop George Montgomery, a native of St. Lawrence, who became the Bishop of Los Angeles, California.

== Education ==
In 1912, the St. William's Elementary School was opened. Ursuline Sisters of Mount St. Joseph were the first teachers there. They were housed in the old parsonage from 1912 to 1915. The building was destroyed by a fire in that year.

From September 1915 the Sisters lived in the homestead of Dr. Drury, owned at that time by Mrs. Anna Lanham and Anna Spalding. The residing pastor, Rev. Francis J. Timony rented the home from them for the Sisters to reside in. During Fr. Timony's time here, an addition to the standing School and Library of St. William was made into a comfortable home for the sisters.

In April 1926 flames engulfed the school and the library that was attached there, along with the sister's residence housed in part of that building. It was a total loss. Several valuable volumes and papers were destroyed along with the building. In 1927 a new brick building was built to house the grade school. During the following years, St. William elementary was staffed by the Sisters of Charity of Nazareth and the Ursuline Sisters of Mount St. Joseph.

St. William High was established in 1937. The high school was consolidated with St. Mary of the Woods High School in the fall of 1967 to form the current Trinity High School which consists of the students from St. Lawrence, St. William and St. Mary of the Woods.

The Mary Carrico Memorial School was dedicated on May 5, 1963. The building was paid for by then Governor Robert Hayes Gore of the Virgin Islands in memory of his mother, Mary Carrico, who was a former teacher at St. William elementary school.

A brick convent was built to house the sisters in 1958 under the leadership of Fr. Robert Whelan. The Sister's residence housed the Sisters of Charity, Ursuline Sisters, and the Sisters of the Lamb of God. In 2004 the building was razed due to new safety and fire code restrictions; the expense to renovate was considered financially unfeasible. The Ursulines had left the area by that time. The Lamb of God sisters moved back into Owensboro where other members of their Order were stationed.

Mary Carrico Memorial School, which serves both St. William and St. Lawrence parishes, has 84 registered students, 55 from St. William community and 29 from the St. Lawrence community. The faculty and staff consist of a part-time principal, 6 full-time teachers, a technology teacher, a part-time music teacher, janitor, full-time secretary and two aides.

As of 2007, St. William's Parish has 395 registered families, consisting of 1,098 men, women and children.
