= Benjamin Jason Horton =

American politician (1873–1963)

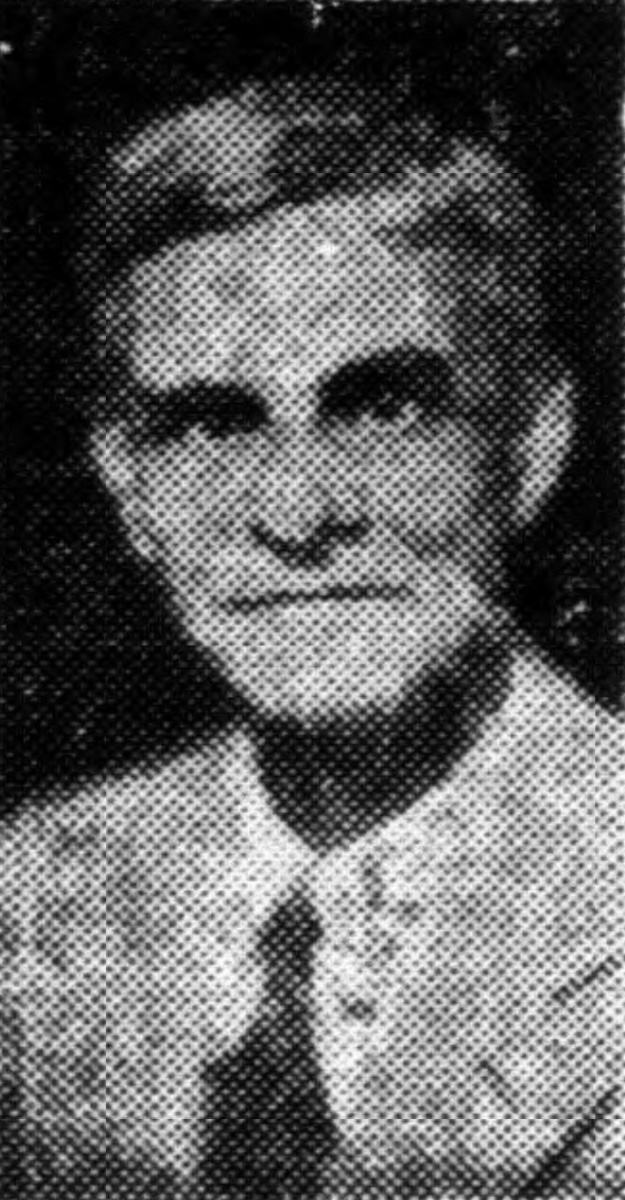
- Horton, c. 1933

Attorney General of Puerto Rico
- In office 1933–1935
- President: Franklin D. Roosevelt
- Preceded by: Charles E. Winter
- Succeeded by: Benigno Fernández García

Acting Governor of Puerto Rico
- In office January 1, 1934 – February 5, 1934
- President: Franklin D. Roosevelt
- Preceded by: Robert Hayes Gore
- Succeeded by: Blanton C. Winship

Personal details
- Born: September 18, 1873 Lawrence, Kansas, U.S.
- Died: June 29, 1963 (aged 89) Amherst, Massachusetts, U.S.

Benjamin Jason Horton (September 18, 1873 – June 29, 1963) was an American politician who served as Attorney General of Puerto Rico from 1933 to 1935, and as acting governor of Puerto Rico. He represented Puerto Rico on the Democratic National Committee from 1932 to 1940, and attended the Democratic National Convention as a delegate eight times.

== Early life ==
Benjamin Jason Horton was born in Lawrence, Kansas. He started to practice law in St. Louis in 1897, and moved to Puerto Rico in 1899.

== Career ==
From 1905 to 1916, Horton was district attorney in Mayagüez, Puerto Rico. He was the United States Commissioner in Ponce, Puerto Rico in 1909. He was a special legal adviser to the Puerto Rico Reconstruction Administration and worked in the Reconstruction Finance Corporation's legal department from 1941 to 1945.

Puerto Rico was represented on the Democratic National Committee by Horton from 1932 to 1940. He served as a delegate to the Democratic National Convention eight times.

Horton served as Attorney General of Puerto Rico from 1933 to 1935.

Governor Robert Hayes Gore took a leave of absence in November 1933, and Horton filled in as acting governor. The Democratic committee in Puerto Rico requested that Horton be appointed as governor. The price of gasoline was set at 20¢ per gallon by Horton on December 31, 1933 in response to a strike by chauffeurs.

== Personal life ==
Horton was the father of two children. Horton died in a nursing home in Amherst, Massachusetts, on June 29, 1963. He was residing in that nursing home for two months since leaving Belchertown, Massachusetts.

== Works cited ==
- "Benjamin Horton Private Rites Scheduled". The Boston Globe. July 1, 1963. p. 19 – via Newspapers.com.
- "Benjamin J. Horton, Puerto Rico Leader". The New York Times. June 30, 1963. Archived from the original on July 15, 2022.
- "Benjamin Horton Private Rites Scheduled". Redlands Daily Facts. January 1, 1934. p. 8 – via Newspapers.com.
- "Extended Leave Is Seen For Gore; Horton Indorsed". The Atlanta Journal. January 8, 1934. p. 3 – via Newspapers.com.
