= 1914 Wyoming gubernatorial election =

- November 3, 1914
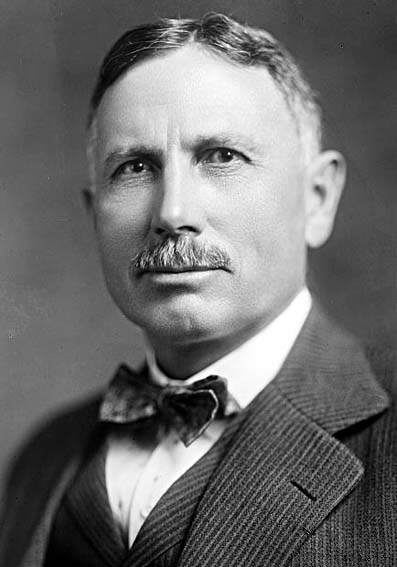

Nominee	John B. Kendrick	Hilliard S. Ridgely
Party	Democratic	Republican
Popular vote	22,387	19,174
Percentage	51.61%	44.20%
- County results Kendrick: 40–50% 50–60% 60–70% 70–80% Ridgely: 40–50% 50–60%
Governor before election
Joseph M. Carey
Progressive
Elected Governor
John B. Kendrick
Democratic

The 1914 Wyoming gubernatorial election took place on November 3, 1914. The Democratic nominee and cattleman John B. Kendrick defeated the Republican Hilliard S. Ridgely with 51.61% of the vote.

== Results ==
Wyoming gubernatorial election, 1914
Party	Candidate	Votes	%
Democratic	John B. Kendrick	22,387	51.61%
Republican	Hilliard S. Ridgely	19,174	44.20%
Socialist	Paul J. Paulson	1,816	4.19%
Total votes		43,377	100%

=== Results by county ===
County	Kendrick	Votes	Ridgely	Votes	Paulson	Votes
Albany	46.59%	1,278	51.29%	1,407	2.11%	58
Big Horn	58.04%	1,343	40.97%	948	0.99%	23
Campbell	54.88%	472	44.42%	382	0.70%	6
Carbon	41.90%	1,228	49.51%	1,451	8.60%	252
Converse	56.93%	801	41.36%	582	1.71%	24
Crook	53.80%	927	42.48%	732	3.71%	64
Fremont	55.08%	1,344	41.97%	1,024	2.95%	72
Goshen	53.58%	591	44.33%	489	2.09%	23
Hot Springs	42.42%	456	47.48%	514	9.77%	105
Johnson	55.15%	744	44.26%	597	0.59%	8
Laramie	53.97%	2,331	44.57%	1,925	1.46%	63
Lincoln	46.97%	1,563	47.09%	1,567	5.95%	198
Natrona	53.42%	907	44.82%	761	1.77%	30
Niobrara	52.93%	569	44.56%	479	2.51%	27
Park	49.64%	908	46.75%	855	3.61%	66
Platte	49.64%	908	46.75%	855	3.61%	66
Sheridan	71.70%	3,113	23.28%	1,011	5.02%	218
Sweetwater	42.63%	1,166	45.34%	1,240	12.03%	329
Uinta	51.03%	966	44.48%	842	4.49%	85
Washakie	63.51%	422	33.91%	236	2.59%	18
Weston	51.61%	738	45.94%	657	2.45%	35
