= 1910 Wyoming state elections =

A general election was held in the U.S. state of Wyoming on Tuesday, November 8, 1910. All of the state's executive officers—the Governor, Secretary of State, Auditor, Treasurer, and Superintendent of Public Instruction—were up for election. Former U.S. Senator Joseph M. Carey won the gubernatorial election, securing the first Democratic win for Governor since 1892. Democratic candidates unseated Republican incumbents in the elections for Secretary of State and Superintendent of Public Instruction, and Republicans narrowly held open seats in elections for State Auditor and Treasurer.

== Governor ==
Incumbent Republican Governor Bryant B. Brooks declined to run for re-election. Former U.S. Senator Joseph M. Carey and Attorney General William E. Mullen were the leading Republican contenders, but Carey instead successfully received the Democratic nomination, and ran against Mullen in the general election. Carey defeated Mullen by a wide margin, the first Democratic gubernatorial victory since 1892.

1910 Wyoming gubernatorial election
Party	Candidate	Votes	%	±%
Democratic	Joseph M. Carey	21,086	55.60%	+20.75
Republican	William E. Mullen	15,235	40.17%	−20.03%
Socialist	W. W. Paterson	1,605	4.23%	−0.33%
Majority		5,851	15.43%	−9.93%
Turnout		37,926	100.00%	
Democratic gain from Republican				

== Secretary of State ==
Incumbent Republican Secretary of State William R. Schnitger ran for re-election to a second term. Cody Mayor Frank L. Houx was nominated by acclamation at the Democratic convention as its nominee for Secretary of State. The contest between Schnitger and Houx was close, and initial vote tallies showed Houx up by several hundred votes, but the final count showed a considerably narrowed result, with Houx up just 37 votes. Nonetheless, Republicans did not contest Houx's election, and Schnitger conceded defeat.

=== General election ===
==== Results ====
1910 Wyoming Secretary of State election
Party	Candidate	Votes	%	±%
Democratic	Frank L. Houx	17,513	47.71%	+12.82%
Republican	William R. Schnitger (inc.)	17,476	47.61%	−12.65%
Socialist	L. Payne	1,718	4.68%	−0.17%
Majority		37	0.10%	−25.27%
Turnout		36,707	100.00%	
Democratic gain from Republican				

== Auditor ==
Incumbent Republican State Auditor LeRoy Grant declined to run for re-election to a fourth term. At the Republican convention, Robert Forsyth, a State Senator from Sweetwater County, was nominated over George Patterson, receiving 117 votes to Patterson's 59. Forsyth was then nominated by acclamation. In the general election, Senator Forsyth faced the Democratic nominee, George C. Forsythe, a Converse County Justice of the Peace. Forsyth ended up narrowly defeating Forsythe, winning by just 766 votes and a 2% margin.

=== General election ===
==== Results ====
1910 Wyoming Auditor election
Party	Candidate	Votes	%	±%
Republican	Robert B. Forsyth	17,845	48.71%	−11.20%
Democratic	G. C. Forsythe	17,079	46.62%	+11.11%
Socialist	J. A. Johnson	1,711	4.67%	+0.09%
Majority		766	2.09%	−22.31%
Turnout		36,635	100.00%	
Republican hold				

== Treasurer ==
Incumbent Republican Treasurer Edward Gillette was unable to seek re-election due to the state constitution's prohibition on state treasurers succeeding themselves. At the Republican convention, State Senator Joseph L. Baird was nominated after former State House Speaker Scott Snively and H. R. Weston both declined to seek the office. At the Democratic convention, Dr. Earl Whedon defeated former State Senator Leopold Kabis for the nomination, and advanced to the general election. In the general election, Baird narrowly defeated Whedon, winning by just 207 votes, or 0.56% of the vote.

=== General election ===
==== Results ====
1910 Wyoming Treasurer election
Party	Candidate	Votes	%	±%
Republican	Joseph L. Baird	17,610	47.99%	−12.62%
Democratic	Earl Whedon	17,403	47.43%	+12.84%
Socialist	G. Silfvast	1,682	4.58%	+0.03%
Majority		207	0.56%	−25.47%
Turnout		36,695	100.00%	
Republican hold				

== Superintendent of Public Instruction ==
Incumbent Republican Superintendent Archibald D. Cook ran for re-election to a second term. At the Democratic convention, Weston County Superintendent of Schools Rose Bird was nominated as Cook's opponent. In the general election, Rose defeated Archibald, winning 49.5% of the vote to Cook's 45.9%.

=== General election ===
==== Results ====
1910 Wyoming Superintendent of Public Instruction election
Party	Candidate	Votes	%	±%
Democratic	Rose A. Bird	18,184	49.53%	+13.86%
Republican	Archibald D. Cook (inc.)	16,841	45.87%	−13.85%
Socialist	Ludy D. Bode	1,691	4.61%	−0.01%
Majority		1,343	3.66%	−20.40%
Turnout		36,716		
Democratic hold				
