= Blanton Winship =

American military lawyer and Governor of Puerto Rico (1869–1947)

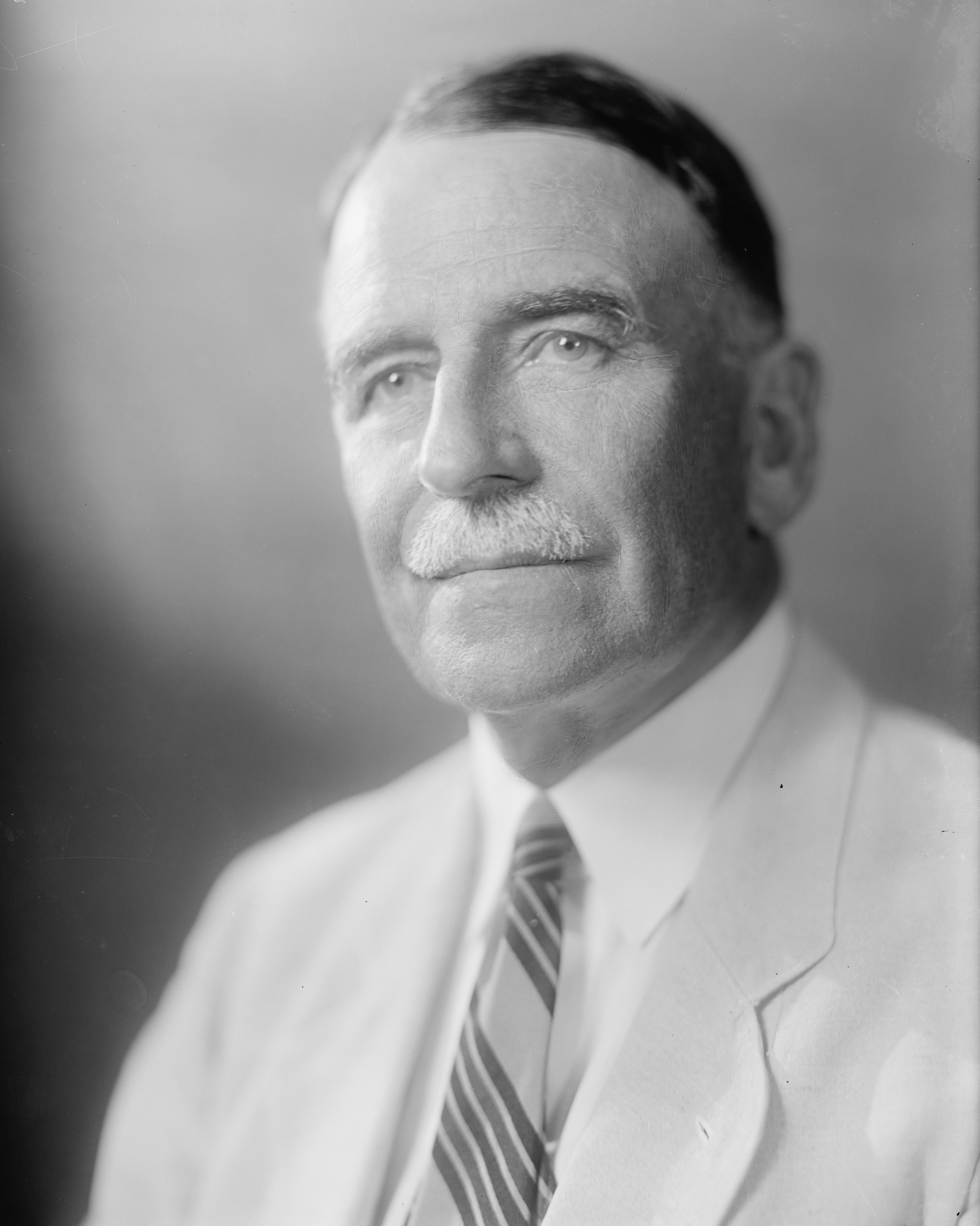

Governor of Puerto Rico
- In office February 5, 1934 – June 25, 1939
- President: Franklin D. Roosevelt
- Preceded by: Benjamin Jason Horton (acting)
- Succeeded by: José E. Colón (acting)

Personal details
- Born: November 23, 1869 Macon, Georgia, US
- Died: October 9, 1947 (aged 77) Washington, DC, US
- Resting place: Rose Hill Cemetery
- Profession: Military

Military service
- Allegiance: United States
- Branch/service: United States Army
- Years of service: 1898–1933; 1942–1944
- Rank: Major general
- Commands: Judge Advocate General; 110th Infantry Regiment; 118th Infantry Regiment
- Battles/wars: Spanish–American War; Pancho Villa Expedition; World War I World War II
- Awards: Distinguished Service Cross; Distinguished Service Medal; Silver Star (2)

Blanton C. Winship (November 23, 1869 – October 9, 1947) was an American military lawyer and veteran of both the Spanish–American War and World War I. During his career, he served both as Judge Advocate General of the United States Army and as the governor of Puerto Rico. An investigation led by the United States Commission on Civil Rights blamed him for the Ponce massacre, where 19 people were killed.

== Early life and education ==
Blanton Winship was born in Macon, Georgia, and graduated from Mercer University in 1889. He received a law degree from the University of Georgia in 1893, where he also played football for one year.

== Career ==
=== Military service ===
During the Spanish–American War, Winship joined the 1st Georgia Infantry, a volunteer force. After the war, President Theodore Roosevelt appointed Winship to become a judge advocate in the Army's Judge Advocate General's Corps. His duties, through 1917, included teaching at the United States Military Academy and authoring, with John Henry Wigmore, the dean of Northwestern University's law school, the Army's first rules of evidence for courts-martial.

Winship was a friend and roommate to Major Archibald Butt. When Butt died in the sinking of the Titanic, Winship was sent by President Taft to Halifax, Nova Scotia to attempt to identify Butt's body, which was never recovered.

When World War I broke out, he fought in France and led several campaigns. Winship commanded the 110th Infantry Regiment (United States) and 118th Infantry Regiments in the 28th Infantry Division (United States) while also serving as the Staff Judge Advocate of First Army. Winship was awarded the Distinguished Service Cross for "extraordinary heroism in action near Lachaussee, France, November 9, 1918." He also received the Silver Star for gallantry in action near Villers sur Fere, France.

Following the war, Winship returned to military law. He was appointed to serve as a military aide to President Calvin Coolidge. Eventually he became the Judge Advocate General of the Army, a position he held from 1931 to his retirement from service in 1933.

=== Governor of Puerto Rico ===
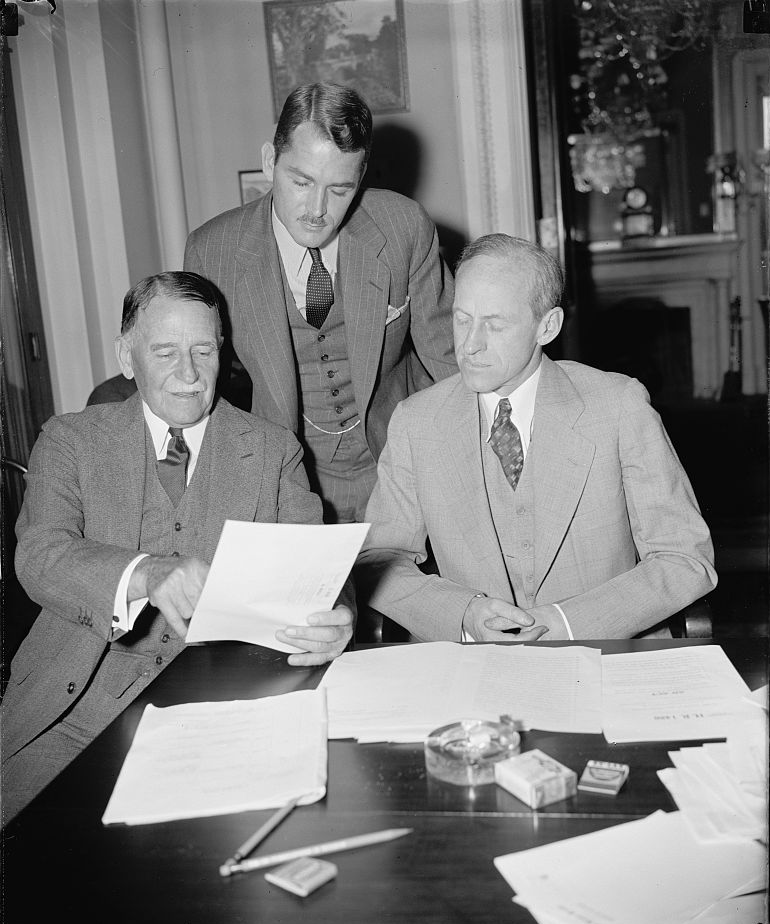
Governor Winship (left) meeting with Virgin Islands governor Lawrence W. Cramer (standing) and Senator Millard Tydings, before the Senate's Territories and Insular Affairs Committee met to consider legislation for U.S. Territories in April, 1938

In 1934, Winship was appointed by Franklin D. Roosevelt as governor of Puerto Rico, succeeding Robert Hayes Gore. This was in part due to major strikes that had taken place that year, causing the administration to fear social unrest. Colonel Francis Riggs accompanied Winship as chief of police. Riggs formerly had assisted Nicaragua's dictator Anastasio Somoza.

As governor, Winship's primary mission was to crush the Puerto Rican Nationalist Party, by imprisoning its leadership and intimidating the rank-and-file membership. Upon arrival he immediately set out to "militarize" the Insular Police force, arming it with machine guns and riot control equipment. Winship also recruited a new police chief, E. Francis Riggs, whose background was in military intelligence, and whose immediate prior occupation had been to "advise" Anastasio Somoza in Nicaragua. Together, Winship and Riggs spent their weekends inspecting the new vigorous police training camps (modeled after military boot camps) which they created throughout the island.

During his time in office, Winship fought to exclude the recently passed minimum wage laws from applying to Puerto Rico, as it would have doubled the hourly wage of 12.5 cents which was standard for sugarcane plantation workers.

Winship criticized many of Secretary of the Interior Harold L. Ickes's policies toward the island (Interior had responsibility for territories and insular affairs). Relief spending during the Great Depression for Puerto Rico was (per capita) far below either that of the mainland or Hawaii. This lack of spending contributed to the poverty of the island, and in turn to social unrest.

In October 1935, the Insular Police killed four Puerto Rican Nationalist Party members at the University of Puerto Rico in Rio Piedras, a neighboring town next to San Juan. The event became known as the Río Piedras massacre. Ramón S. Pagan, Pedro Quiñones, Eduardo Rodríguez Vera, José Santiago Barea and a bystander were killed. On February 23, 1936, the nationalists Hiram Rosado and Elías Beauchamp retaliated by killing Col. Riggs in San Juan. Captured, both Rosado and Beauchamp were executed at the police headquarters without trial. No law enforcement officer ever stood trial for the executions.

Following these events, the government rounded up numerous Nationalist Party members and charged them with sedition. The party's president, Pedro Albizu Campos, and others were sentenced to 10 years in prison by a United States federal court.

==== Ponce massacre ====
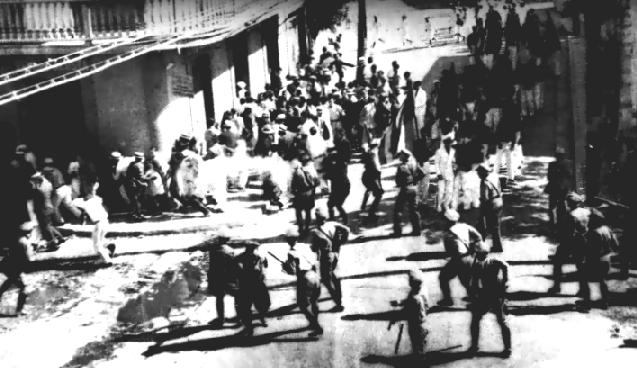
Carlos Torres Morales, a photo journalist for the newspaper El Imparcial was covering the march and took this photograph when the shooting began.

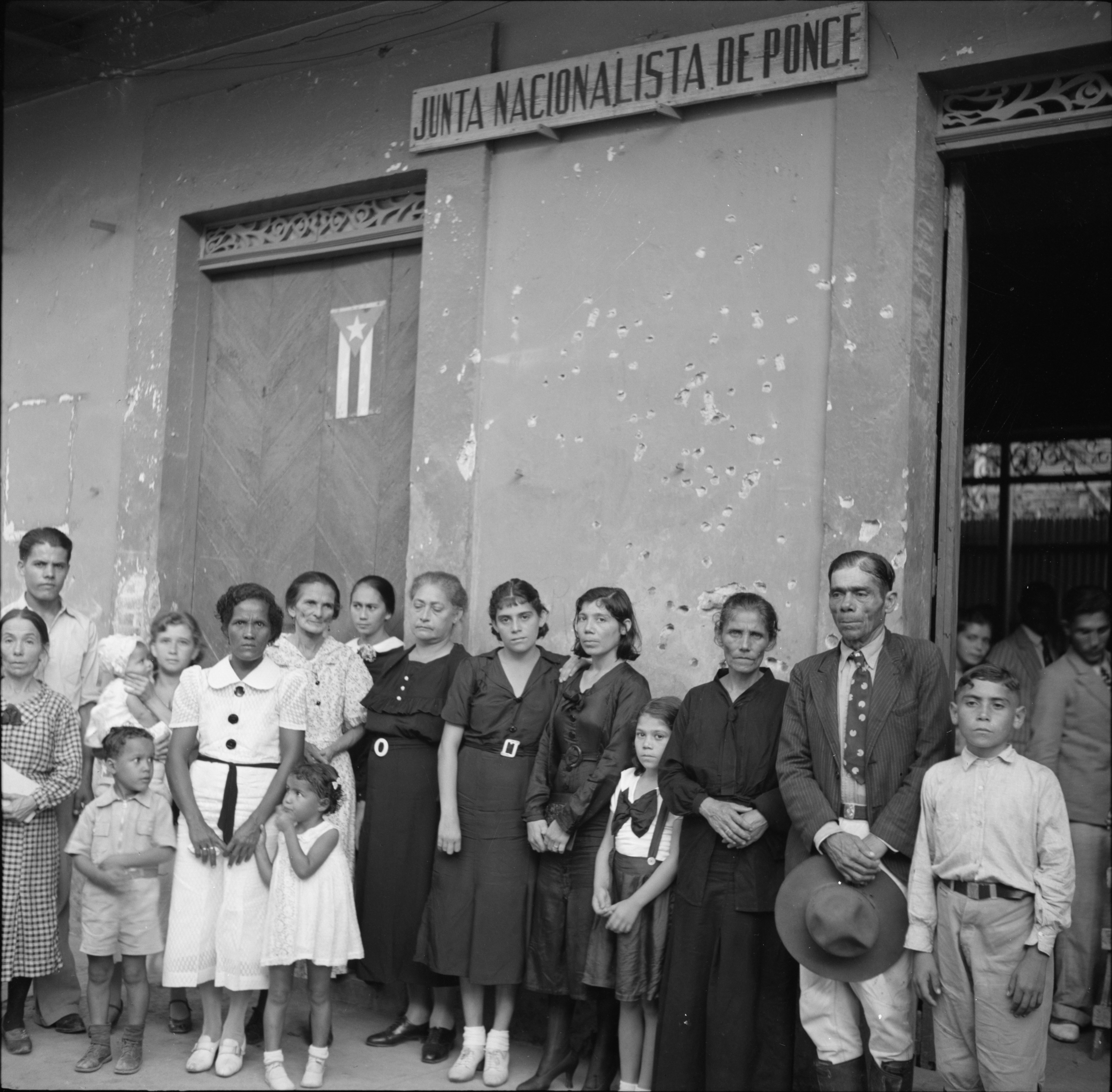
Relatives of victims killed in the Ponce massacre. Machine gun bullet holes are visible in the wall. (Ponce, Puerto Rico)

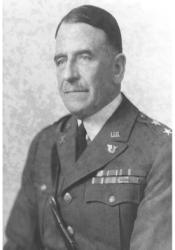

On Palm Sunday (March 21), 1937, Governor Winship cancelled a Nationalist parade, which was to have taken place in Ponce to commemorate the 1873 abolition of slavery, only an hour before it was to have begun. Winship ordered the police chief to increase the police presence in the city to stop, "by all means necessary", any demonstration by the nationalists. When the march continued anyway, the police fired upon the marchers and bystanders. They killed 19 people and wounded more than 200, all of whom were unarmed. 150 protesters were arrested. This event, called the Ponce massacre, sparked outrage across the island and in the U.S. Congress.

The Minnesota Representative John Bernard gave a speech on April 14 denouncing the action. The full speech can be seen in the Congressional Record of April 14, 1937, page 4499. Congressman Vito Marcantonio of New York also criticized Winship, and in 1939, President Roosevelt eventually replaced him as governor of Puerto Rico.

Following these events, many of the leaders of the Nationalist party were tried for insurrection, and after a hung jury and retrial, six were sentenced to life in prison. Because the prosecutors were appointed by Governor Winship, Congressmen Vito Marcantonio and John T. Bernard suggested that this may have contributed to a bias in Winship's favor.

A six-week American Civil Liberties Union investigation led by chair, Arthur Garfield Hays, with Fulgencio Pinero, Emilio Belaval, Jose Davila Rice, Antonio Ayuso Valdivieso, Manuel Diaz Garcia, and Franscisco M. Zeno, as members, concluded that the police acted as a mob, and that the events on March 21 constituted a massacre. Their report harshly criticized the repressive tactics and massive civil rights violations by the administration of Governor Winship.

==== Removal from office ====
Following the events of the Ponce massacre, a grand jury convened to investigate the Ponce events, but it was closed before it could indict anyone. The prosecutor investigating the case reported at a news conference that Governor Winship was interfering with his investigation and resigned under protest. Almost simultaneously with the prosecutor's investigation, a federal law which allowed public officials to be indicted was repealed, effectively granting Governor Winship immunity from further prosecution.

The following year, Governor Winship moved the celebration of the 40th anniversary of the United States invasion of Puerto Rico from the traditional San Juan location to the city of Ponce. During this celebration, on July 25, 1938, Ángel Esteban Antongiorgi attempted to assassinate the governor and managed to fire several shots before being killed by the police (one police officer was also killed in the attempted assassination).

Congressional turmoil continued to cloud the Winship governorship and President Roosevelt removed Winship from office on May 12, 1939, after charges were filed against him by New York Congressman Vito Marcantonio. President Roosevelt appointed William D. Leahy as Winship's successor, although Leahy did not take office for several months (during which time José E. Colóm served as acting governor).

=== World War II ===
During World War II, Winship returned to active duty. During this time, he served as one of the presiding judges of a military tribunal in the United States during the trial of eight German saboteurs who were arrested in the country. Winship retired in 1944. At 75, he was at that time the oldest Army officer on active duty.

== Death ==
Winship died in Washington, aged 77, and was buried at the Rosehill Cemetery in Georgia.

== See also ==
- List of governors of Puerto Rico

Political offices
Preceded by Benjamin Jason Horton (acting)	Governor of Puerto Rico; February 5, 1934 — June 25, 1939	Succeeded by José E. Colón (acting)
