= Clarence D. Clark =

American politician (1851–1930)

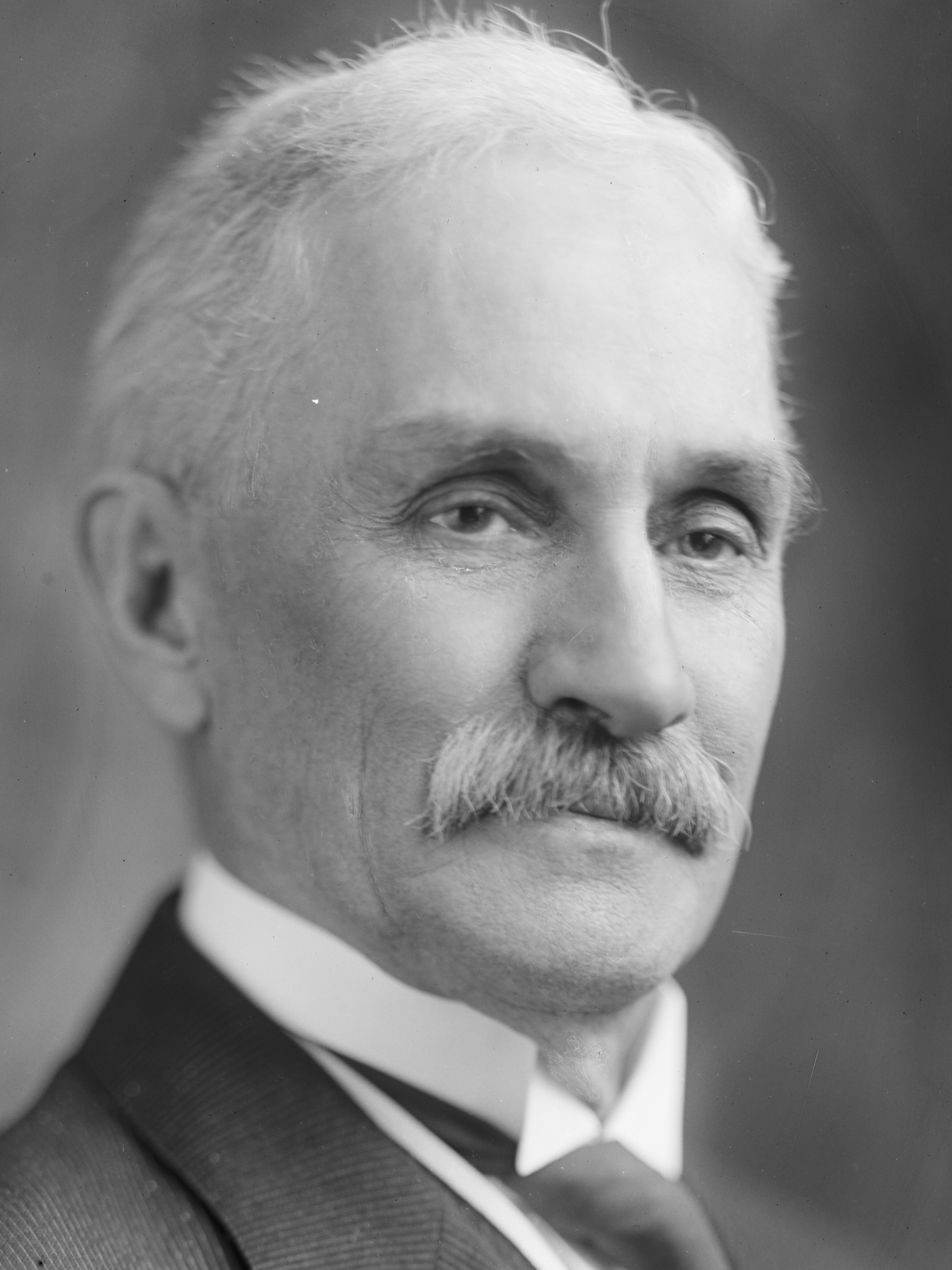

United States Senator from Wyoming
- In office January 23, 1895 – March 3, 1917
- Preceded by: Francis E. Warren
- Succeeded by: John B. Kendrick

Member of the U.S. House of Representatives from Wyoming's at-large district
- In office December 1, 1890 – March 3, 1893
- Preceded by: District Created
- Succeeded by: Henry A. Coffeen

Personal details
- Born: April 16, 1851 Sandy Creek, New York, U.S.
- Died: November 18, 1930 (aged 79) Evanston, Wyoming, U.S.
- Party: Republican
- Spouse: Alice Downs
- Education: University of Iowa
- Profession: Politician, Lawyer, Teacher

Clarence Don Clark (April 16, 1851 – November 18, 1930) was an American teacher, lawyer, and politician from New York. He participated in the constitutional convention for Wyoming's statehood and was that state's first congressman. He served as both a United States representative and United States Senator.

== Biography ==
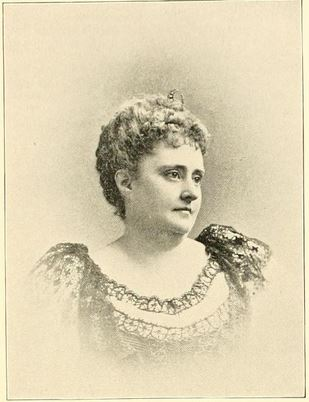
Alice Downs

Clark was born in Sandy Creek, New York to Oratia D. Clark and Laura A. (King) Clark. He attended the University of Iowa at Iowa City. He studied law and was admitted to the bar in 1874. He was a teacher and practiced law in Manchester, Iowa. Clark married Alice Downs in 1874. In 1881, he moved to Evanston in the Wyoming Territory and continued the practice of law before becoming the county attorney of Uinta County, a job he held between 1882 and 1884.

In 1889, he began his political career as a delegate to the Wyoming constitutional convention. He was elected as a Republican to the United States House of Representatives for the Fifty-first United States Congress and was reelected to the Fifty-second United States Congress. He was one of the new state's first representatives. He remained in office two terms, from December 1, 1890, until March 3, 1893. He lost his bid for reelection in 1892.

He was elected as a United States senator in a special election to fill a vacancy in 1895 and was reelected to that seat three times, serving from January 23, 1895, until March 3, 1917. After losing the election in 1916, he resumed the practice of law in Washington, D.C., but was appointed as a member of the International Joint Commission in 1919. He served as its chairman from 1923 until his retirement in 1929. After retirement, he moved back to Evanston, Wyoming where he lived until his death. Clark died on November 18, 1930, and is interred at the Masonic Cemetery in Evanston.

Party political offices
First	Republican nominee for U.S. Senator from Wyoming (Class 1); 1916	Succeeded by Frank Wheeler Mondell
Legal offices
Preceded by —	County Attorney of Uinta County, Wyoming; 1882–1884	Succeeded by —
U.S. House of Representatives
Preceded by Joseph M. Carey as Congressional Delegate	Member of the U.S. House of Representatives from Wyoming; December 1, 1890 – March 3, 1893	Succeeded by Henry A. Coffeen
U.S. Senate
Preceded by Francis E. Warren	U.S. senator (Class 1) from Wyoming; January 23, 1895 – March 4, 1917; Served alongside: Joseph M. Carey, Francis E. Warren	Succeeded by John B. Kendrick
Preceded by Orville H. Platt	Chairman of the Senate Judiciary Committee; 1905–1912	Succeeded by Charles Allen Culberson
Government offices
Preceded by Obadiah Gardner	U.S. Chairman of the International Joint Commission; April 6, 1923 – April 30, 1929	Succeeded by John H. Bartlett
