= Vincent Carter =

American politician (1891–1972)

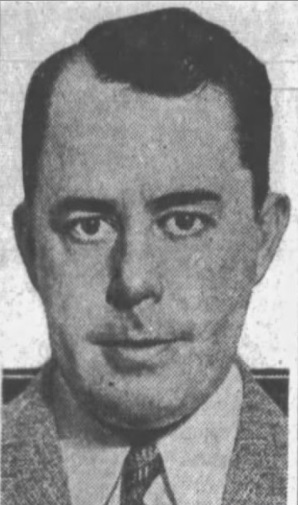
- The Salt Lake Tribune, July 12, 1931

Member of the U.S. House of Representatives from Wyoming's at-large district
- In office March 4, 1929 – January 3, 1935
- Preceded by: Charles E. Winter
- Succeeded by: Paul R. Greever

14th Wyoming State Auditor
- In office 1923–1929
- Governor: William B. Ross; Frank E. Lucas; Nellie Tayloe Ross; Frank C. Emerson
- Preceded by: Ishmael C. Jefferis
- Succeeded by: Roscoe Alcorn

Personal details
- Born: November 6, 1891 St. Clair, Pennsylvania, US
- Died: December 30, 1972 (aged 81) Albuquerque, New Mexico, US
- Party: Republican
- Spouse(s): Helen K. Carlson (m. 1921); Mary Catherine Crowley (m. 1929)
- Children: 4
- Education: Fordham University; Columbus School of Law
- Occupation: Attorney

Military service
- Allegiance: United States; Wyoming
- Branch/service: Marine Corps; Wyoming Army National Guard
- Years of service: 1917–1919 (Marine Corps); 1919–1921 (National Guard)
- Rank: First Lieutenant (Marine Corps); Captain (National Guard)
- Unit: 8th Marine Regiment (Marine Corps)
- Commands: Troop A, 58th Machine Gun Squadron (National Guard)
- Battles/wars: World War I

Vincent Michael Carter (Note: Carter appears to have been born Michael Vincent Carter, and to have inverted his first and middle names. His name appears in records as Vincent Carter, M. Vincent Carter, Vincent M. Carter, and Vincent Michael Carter.) (November 6, 1891 – December 30, 1972) was a United States representative from Wyoming.

== Early life ==
Carter was born in St. Clair, Pennsylvania on November 6, 1891, a son of William Joseph Carter and Julia Ann (Clarke) Carter. He moved with his parents to Pottsville in 1893. He attended public schools, the United States Naval Academy Preparatory School, and Fordham University.

== Military service ==
During World War I he served in the United States Marine Corps as a first lieutenant assigned to the 8th Marine Regiment. After the war, he helped organize the Wyoming Army National Guard's Troop A, 58th Machine Gun Squadron, which he commanded with the rank of captain from 1919 to 1921.

== Career ==
Carter was admitted to the bar in 1919, and commenced practice in Casper, Wyoming. He moved to Kemmerer, Wyoming in 1929 and continued the practice of law, serving as deputy attorney general of Wyoming from 1919 to 1923. In 1922, Carter was elected Wyoming State Auditor, and he was re-elected in 1926.

== Member of Congress ==
In 1928, Carter was elected as a Republican to the Seventy-first and to the two succeeding Congresses, serving from March 4, 1929, to January 3, 1935; he was not a candidate for renomination in 1934, but was an unsuccessful candidate for election to the U.S. Senate. In 1930, Carter received his LL.B. degree from He graduated in 1915 from Catholic University's Columbus School of Law in Washington, D.C. After leaving Congress, he resumed the practice of law in Cheyenne, retiring in 1965; he was a delegate to the Republican National Conventions in 1936 and 1940.

== Later life ==
Carter retired in 1965. He died in Albuquerque, New Mexico on December 30, 1972. He was buried at Mt. Calvary Cemetery in Albuquerque.

== Family ==
In 1921, Carter married Helen K. Carlson. She died in 1926, and in 1929 he married Mary Catherine Crowley.

== Notes ==
Party political offices
Preceded by Charles E. Winter	Republican nominee for U.S. Senator from Wyoming (Class 1); 1934	Succeeded by Milward Simpson
U.S. House of Representatives
Preceded by Charles E. Winter	Member of the U.S. House of Representatives from Wyoming's at-large congressional district March 4, 1929 – January 3, 1935	Succeeded by Paul R. Greever
