= Robert Hayes Gore =

American politician (1886–1972)

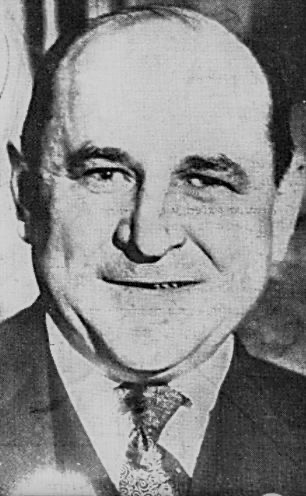
- Gore in 1933

Governor of Puerto Rico
- In office July 3, 1933 – January 1, 1934
- President: Franklin D. Roosevelt
- Preceded by: James R. Beverley
- Succeeded by: Benjamin Jason Horton (acting)

Personal details
- Born: May 24, 1886 Knottsville, Kentucky, US
- Died: December 26, 1972 (aged 86) Florida, US
- Profession: Politician, Newspaper

Robert Hayes Gore (May 24, 1886 – December 26, 1972) was an American politician and successful newspaper publisher who was appointed as the governor of Puerto Rico, serving from July 1933 to January 1934.

== Early life ==
He was born in Knottsville, Kentucky and attended local schools. He became a newspaper writer after being fascinated by papers as a boy.

== Marriage and family ==
Gore married and he and his wife had nine children.

== Newspaper career ==
He went on to become an editor-publisher in the Scripps chain, soon heading newspapers in Evansville, Indiana, and Terre Haute, Indiana. While the editor-publisher of the Terre Haute Post, Gore conceived the idea of "giving away" $1,000 travel life insurance policies with new newspaper subscriptions. After securing an underwriter, Gore took his program nationwide, later establishing another publishing house in Terre Haute and an insurance agency in Chicago to handle the business.

== Governor of Puerto Rico ==
While residing in Terre Haute, Gore met Franklin D. Roosevelt campaigning for Vice President of the U.S. That fortuitous meeting ultimately resulted in Gore's appointment as Governor of Puerto Rico. Prior to his stint in Puerto Rico, he split his time between his interests in Terre Haute, Chicago and Ft. Lauderdale, Florida. According to The Washington Post, Gore was a strong campaigner for Franklin D. Roosevelt in the 1932 election. This contributed to Roosevelt's decision to reward Gore with the appointment as governor the following year. According to his biography, Gore was a key Roosevelt supporter.

During his inaugural speech as governor, on July 1, 1933, Gore outlined his platform for the protectorate in three major elements: eventual statehood, opposition to birth control (there had been considerable controversy over this issue during the term of his predecessor, Governor James Rumsey Beverley) and legalizing cockfighting, which Gore believed would benefit tourism. (His plan included a yearly "great carnival of cockfighting" to attract mainland tourists.)

Rather than suggesting birth control to the predominantly Catholic residents, Gore advocated a plan to relocate Puerto Ricans to Florida to relieve overcrowding on the island. He also recommended greater links with his home city of Chicago, and minimizing government spending. During his term as governor, a political satire drama was written by Gustavo Jiménez Sicardó, entitled "Gore's Hell", which criticized his political views on Puerto Rico. There was an attempt against his life, organized by a group of 14 individuals from different political views on the island. On January 12, 1934, Gore's "resignation" was accepted. He was replaced by Blanton Winship.

After his stint as governor, Gore served as an alternate delegate to the 1944 Democratic National Convention.

== Orchids ==
After learning about orchids in Puerto Rico and returning to Florida, he began to cultivate and sell orchids maintaining a very large green house.

== Death and legacy ==
He died at age 86 in Florida and his remains rest at Lauderdale Memorial Park. After his death his Federal Estate Tax Return reported that upon his death his estate totaled slightly over $15 million of which he donated approximately $6.4 million to charity (in 2025 dollars approximately $114 million and $49 million respectively).

Preceded by James R. Beverley	Governor of Puerto Rico; July 3, 1933 – January 1, 1934	Succeeded by Benjamin Jason Horton (Acting)
