= Charles E. Winter =

American politician

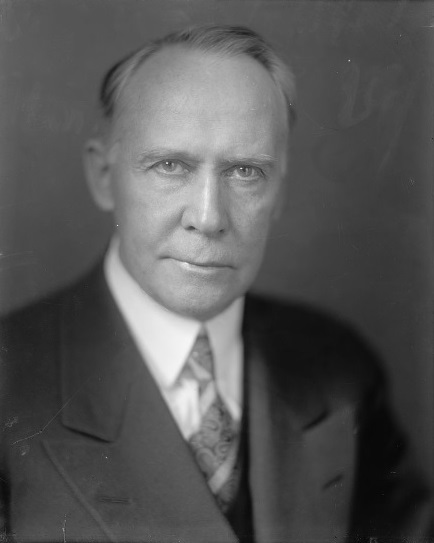

Attorney General of Puerto Rico
- In office 1932–1933
- Governor: Theodore Roosevelt Jr. James R. Beverley
- Preceded by: James R. Beverley
- Succeeded by: Benjamin Jason Horton

Member of the U.S. House of Representatives from Wyoming's at-large district
- In office March 4, 1923 – March 3, 1929
- Preceded by: Frank W. Mondell
- Succeeded by: Vincent M. Carter

Personal details
- Born: September 13, 1870 Muscatine, Iowa, U.S.
- Died: April 22, 1948 (aged 77) Casper, Wyoming, U.S.
- Party: Republican
- Education: Nebraska Wesleyan University

Charles Edwin Winter (September 13, 1870 – April 22, 1948) was an American attorney, politician, and author who served as a member of the United States House of Representatives for Wyoming's at-large congressional district from 1923 to 1929.

== Early life and education ==
Born in Muscatine, Iowa, he attended public schools and Iowa Wesleyan College in Mount Pleasant. He graduated from the Nebraska Wesleyan University in 1892, studied law, and was admitted to the bar in 1895.

== Career ==
Winter began his legal career in Omaha, Nebraska. He moved to Encampment, Wyoming, in 1902 and to Casper in 1903. He was a delegate to the Republican National Convention in 1908 and was a judge of the sixth judicial district of Wyoming from 1913 to 1919. He resigned from the bench and resumed the practice of law at Casper.

Winter was elected as a Republican to the Sixty-eighth, Sixty-ninth, and Seventieth Congresses, serving from March 4, 1923, to March 3, 1929; he was not a candidate for renomination in 1928, but was an unsuccessful candidate for election to the U.S. Senate. He was attorney general of Puerto Rico in 1932 and 1933, and served as acting governor. He later resumed the practice of law in Wyoming and died in Casper in 1948.

During the summer of 1903, while traveling on a train in Pennsylvania, Winter wrote the lyrics to "Wyoming", the official state song. His western novels included Grandon of Sierra, about a cowboy who gives up ranging to be a prospector in the Encampment copper rush, and Ben Warman, which was adapted into the 1920 film Dangerous Love. Gold of Freedom was set in Wyoming's South Pass.

Party political offices
Preceded by Frank Wheeler Mondell	Republican nominee for U.S. Senator from Wyoming (Class 1); 1928	Succeeded by Vincent Carter
U.S. House of Representatives
Preceded by Frank Wheeler Mondell	Member of the U.S. House of Representatives from Wyoming's at-large congressional district March 4, 1923 – March 3, 1929	Succeeded by Vincent Carter
