= Frank L. Houx =

American politician (1854–1941)

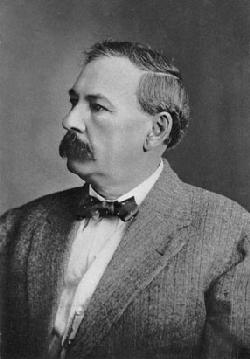

10th Governor of Wyoming
- In office February 26, 1917 – January 6, 1919
- Preceded by: John B. Kendrick
- Succeeded by: Robert D. Carey

5th Secretary of State of Wyoming
- In office January 2, 1911 – January 6, 1919
- Governor: Joseph M. Carey; John B. Kendrick; Himself
- Preceded by: William Schnitger
- Succeeded by: William E. Chaplin

Personal details
- Born: Frank Lee Houx; December 12, 1854 Lexington, Missouri, U.S.
- Died: April 3, 1941 (aged 86) Cody, Wyoming, U.S.
- Party: Democratic
- Spouse(s): Augusta Camp; Ida Mason Christy
- Children: 7
- Parents: George Washington Houx (father); Frances Pearl Price (mother)
- Relatives: Sterling Price
- Education: Shaw's Business College

Frank Lee Houx (December 12, 1854 – April 3, 1941) was an American politician from the Democratic Party who served as the tenth governor of Wyoming from 1917 to 1919 and as the fifth secretary of state of Wyoming from 1911 to 1919.

== Life ==
Frank Lee Houx was born near Lexington, Missouri to George Washington Houx, who later served in the Confederate States Army under Sterling Price, and Frances Pearl Price on December 12, 1854, although he has conflicting dates of birth that go up to 1860. He grew up on his family's ranch and in 1875 he married Augusta Camp whom he later had three children with. On April 10, 1898, Augusta died and Houx remarried in 1899 to Ida Mason Christy whom he had four children with.

He took up the study of law, reading in the office of John S. Blackwell, of Lexington, Missouri. Houx did not complete his course, however, turning his attention to commercial interests. He graduated from Shaw's Business College in Kansas City, Missouri in 1884. The next year, he moved to Montana and went into the cattle business. In 1895, he took up residence in Cody, Wyoming, where he went into politics.

=== Politics ===
He became involved with William F. Cody and helped in the creation of Cody, Wyoming. In 1901 he ran for mayor of Cody following its incorporation in its first mayoral election and defeated George T. Beck. During his first term as Mayor, he also served as police judge from 1902 to 1903. He was re-elected to a second mayoral term in 1905. During the next four years, the town built a residence for him and it now serves as a bed and breakfast known as the "Mayor's Inn". From 1902 to 1903 he served as Cody's police judge and returned to the mayoralty from 1905 to 1909.

During the 1910 elections Houx was nominated by the Democratic Party for Secretary of State and won in the general election becoming the first Democrat to hold the office in Wyoming's history and was reelected in 1914 with both of his victories being extremely narrow. When Governor John B. Kendrick resigned his office on February 26, 1917, after being elected to the United States Senate, Houx became Acting Governor, and he served until the expiration of Kendrick's term, leaving office on January 6, 1919. He sought election as governor in his own right in 1918, but was defeated by Republican candidate Robert D. Carey.

During his service as governor during World War I, Houx mobilized the National Guard of Wyoming for federal service, appointed the Wyoming Council for National Defense, and nominated persons to administer the Selective Service draft. He supported alcoholic prohibition and during the process of ratification for the 18th Amendment he wrote to thirty seven governors asking for them to support the amendment and received support from sixteen of them. On January 19, 1918, his son, Christy Houx, was found dead after multiple draggings of Lindenmeier Lake after his iceboat had capsized on January 16.

=== Later life ===
Houx then went into the oil refining business in Texas. In 1931 he became involved in gold mining and established offices in Denver, Colorado to promote gold mining development in San Juan county. He returned to Cody in 1935 and in 1938 suffered a fall that caused him to break a hip, but later recovered. On April 3, 1941, he died at the Irma Hotel after suffering from an illness for two years at the age of 86 and was interred in Cody Cemetery. The autobiography he wrote in 1939 was published in serial form by the Cody Enterprise newspaper in the months following his death.

== Electoral history ==
Frank L. Houx electoral history

1910 Wyoming Secretary of State election
Party	Candidate	Votes	%
Democratic	Frank L. Houx	17,513	47.71%
Republican	William R. Schnitger (incumbent)	17,476	47.61%
Socialist	Lyman Payne	1,718	4.68%
Total votes		36,707	100.00%

1914 Wyoming Secretary of State election
Party	Candidate	Votes	%	±%
Democratic	Frank L. Houx (incumbent)	19,304	47.04%	−0.67%
Republican	Birney H. Sage	19,184	46.75%	−0.86%
Socialist	William Hill	1,813	4.42%	−0.26%
Progressive	E. C. Raymond	734	1.79%	+1.79%
Total votes		41,035	100.00%	

1918 Wyoming Gubernatorial Democratic primary
Party	Candidate	Votes	%
Democratic	Frank L. Houx (incumbent)	4,393	56.91%
Democratic	William B. Ross	3,326	43.09%
Total votes		7,719	100.00%

1918 Wyoming Gubernatorial election
Party	Candidate	Votes	%	±%
Republican	Robert D. Carey	23,825	56.11%	+11.91%
Democratic	Frank L. Houx (incumbent)	18,640	43.90%	−7.71%
Total votes		42,465	100.00%	

Party political offices
Preceded by John B. Kendrick	Democratic nominee for Governor of Wyoming; 1918	Succeeded by William B. Ross
Political offices
Preceded by William Schnitger	Secretary of State of Wyoming; 1911-1919	Succeeded by William E. Chaplin
Preceded by John B. Kendrick	Governor of Wyoming; February 26, 1917 – January 6, 1919	Succeeded by Robert D. Carey
