= John B. Kendrick =

American politician (1857–1933)

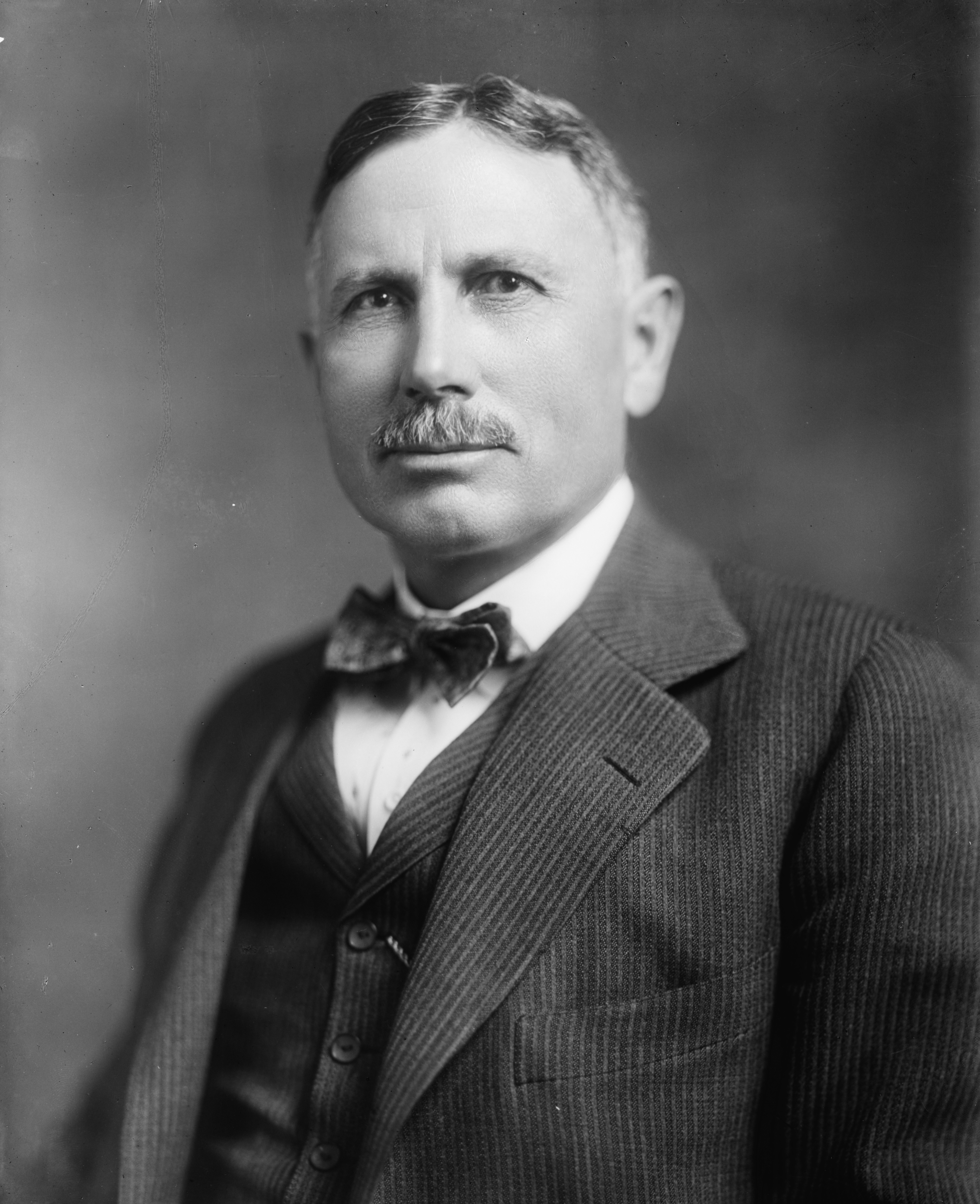

United States Senator from Wyoming
- In office March 4, 1917 – November 3, 1933
- Preceded by: Clarence D. Clark
- Succeeded by: Joseph C. O'Mahoney

9th Governor of Wyoming
- In office January 4, 1915 – February 26, 1917
- Preceded by: Joseph M. Carey
- Succeeded by: Frank L. Houx

Member of the Wyoming State Senate
- In office 1910–1914
- Succeeded by: Theodore C. Diers

Personal details
- Born: John Benjamin Kendrick; September 6, 1857 Rusk, Texas, U.S.
- Died: November 3, 1933 (aged 76) Sheridan, Wyoming, U.S.
- Party: Democratic
- Spouse: Eula Wulfjen
- Children: 2
- Parents: John Harvey Kendrick (father); Anna Maye (mother)

John Benjamin Kendrick (September 6, 1857 – November 3, 1933) was an American politician and cattleman who served as a United States senator from Wyoming and as the ninth governor of Wyoming as a member of the Democratic Party.

== Early life ==
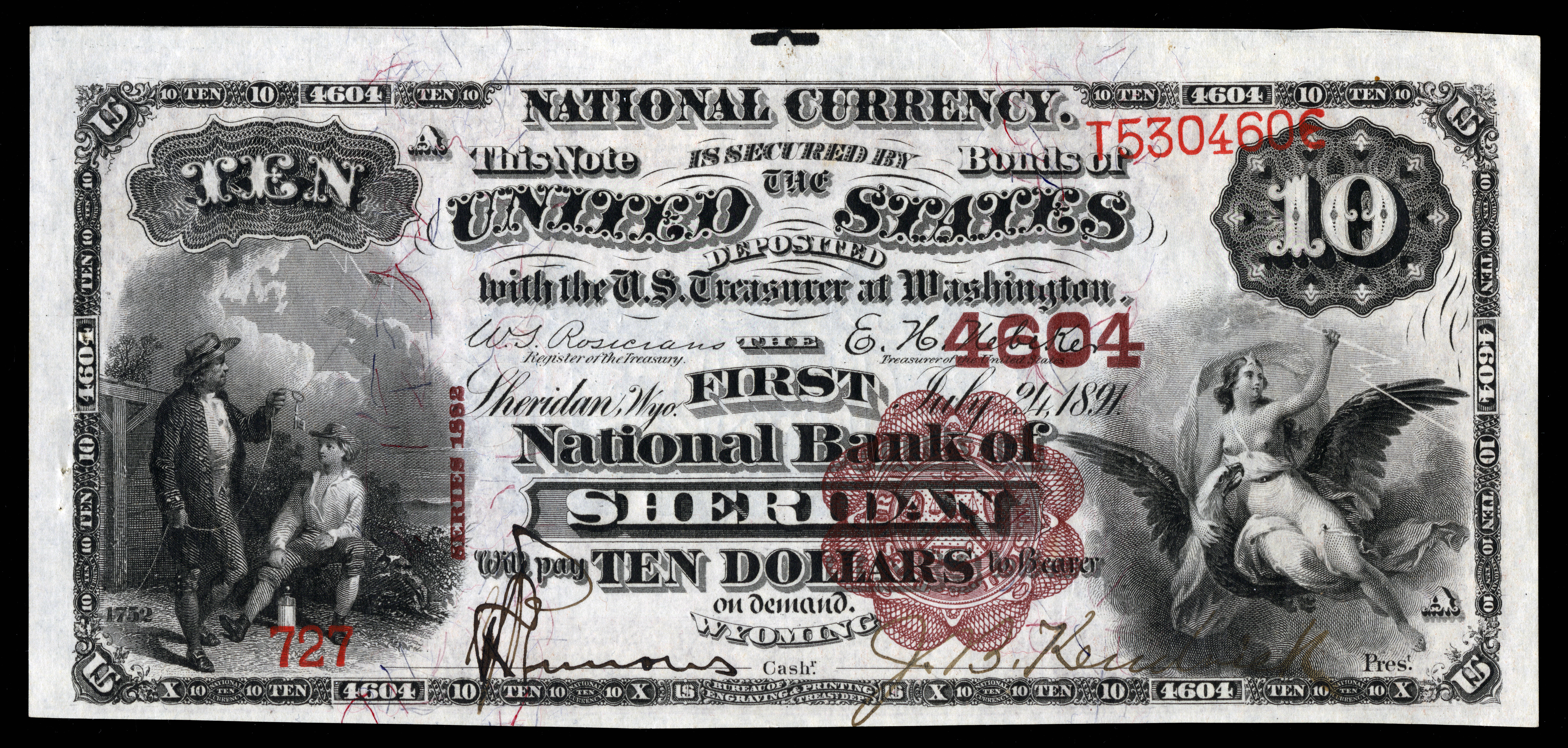
A $10 National Bank Note, Series 1882 Brown Back, from the First National Bank of Sheridan, Wyoming with the hand-signed signature of John B. Kendrick.

John Benjamin Kendrick was born near Rusk, Texas to John Harvey Kendrick and Anna Maye on September 6, 1857. He grew up on his family's ranch and attended a public school in Florence, Texas until the seventh grade.

In March 1879 he was employed by Charles W. Wulfjen to move cattle from Texas to Wyoming. He arrived in the Wyoming Territory in August 1879 and settled on a ranch near Sheridan, where he raised cattle as a cowboy, ranch foreman, and later cattle company owner. In 1883 he returned to Texas and bought a cattle herd to establish his ranch in Wyoming. He married Eula Wulfjen on January 20, 1891. In 1895 he purchased the property in Nielsen Heights for his future home, and in 1908 began construction on the home, which came to be called Trail End. In 1970, Trail End was added to the National Register of Historic Places; in 1982 it was donated to the state of Wyoming for operation as a museum.

Kendrick worked as foreman for his father-in-law's cattle company from 1879 until 1883. He was employed by and invested into the Lance Creek Cattle Company and the Converse Cattle Company which he later became owner of in 1897. Kendrick became president of the First National Bank of Sheridan in 1900 and served until 1902.

== Politics ==
In 1909 he moved to Sheridan and was elected President of the Wyoming Stock Growers Association. He was a member of the Wyoming State Senate from 1910 to 1914. In 1911 he was given the Democratic Senate nomination by acclamation by other Democratic members of the legislature, but was defeated by incumbent Senator Clarence D. Clark. He was given the nomination again in 1912, but was also defeated by Senator Francis E. Warren. He was a delegate to the Democratic National Convention from Wyoming in 1916 and 1924.

He then served as Governor of Wyoming from 1915 until he resigned in 1917, having been elected as a Democratic candidate to the United States Senate in 1916. During Kendrick's time as governor, various labor laws were introduced.

Kendrick was reelected to the Senate in 1922 and 1928 and served from March 4, 1917, until his death at Sheridan, Wyoming, in 1933. In 1932 he received an honorary law degree from the University of Wyoming.

The Kendrick Cabinet
Office	Name	Term
Governor	John B. Kendrick	1915–1917
Secretary of State	Frank L. Houx	1915–1917
State Auditor	Robert B. Forsyth	1915–1917
State Treasurer	Herman B. Gates	1915–1917
Superintendent of Public Instruction	Edith K. O. Clark	1915–1917

He was credited with beginning the investigations into the Teapot Dome scandal, a bribery incident that took place from 1922 until 1923, and was considered as a candidate in the 1924 and 1928 presidential elections. During the 1924 presidential election, Wyoming's six Democratic delegates were instructed to vote for Kendrick at the 1924 Democratic National Convention and did so for the first three ballots. During the 1928 presidential election, he was considered as a possible vice presidential nominee, but the nomination was later given to Senator Minority Leader Joseph Taylor Robinson at the convention.

He served as chairman of the Committee on Canadian Relations (Sixty-fifth Congress) and member of the Committee on Public Lands and Surveys (Seventy-third Congress). He introduced legislation that helped create the Grand Teton National Park in northwestern Wyoming.

== Personal life ==
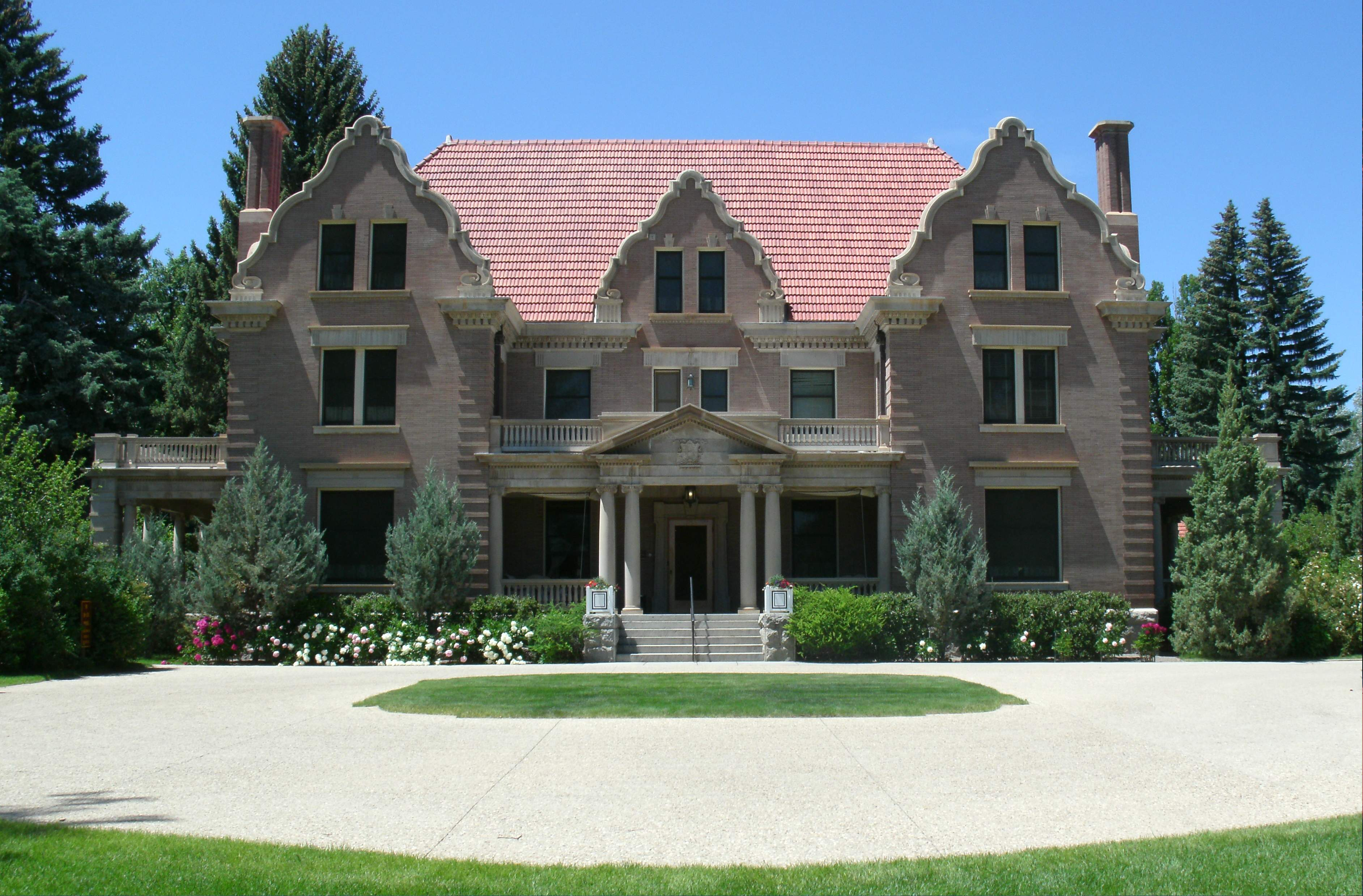
Trail End, completed in 1913, is located in Sheridan, Wyoming. Known locally as the Kendrick Mansion, it was the home of John B. Kendrick and his family. It is now a house museum operated by the Wyoming Department of State Parks and Cultural Resources

His daughter Rosa Maye married army officer Hubert Reilly Harmon.

On November 2, 1933 Kendrick fell into a coma and was initially diagnosed with a cerebral hemorrhage, but they later determined that he suffered a uremia and died the next day. Governor Edwin C. Johnson praised him for his service as senator and Kendrick was interred in Mount Hope Cemetery in Sheridan, Wyoming. First Assistant Postmaster General Joseph C. O'Mahoney was appointed by Governor Leslie A. Miller to fill the vacancy created by Kendrick's death and won the Senate special election to fill out the rest of Kendrick's term in 1934.

Kendrick was inducted into the Hall of Great Westerners in the National Cowboy Hall of Fame in 1958.

== Electoral history ==
John B. Kendrick electoral history

1911 Wyoming Senate election
Party	Candidate	Votes	%	±%
Republican	Clarence D. Clark (incumbent)	46	57.50%	
Democratic	John B. Kendrick	34	42.50%	
Total votes		'80'	'100.00%'	

1912 Wyoming Senate election
Party	Candidate	Votes	%	±%
Republican	Francis E. Warren (incumbent)	47	55.95%	
Democratic	John B. Kendrick	37	44.05%	
Total votes		'84'	'100.00%'	

1916 Wyoming Senate election
Party	Candidate	Votes	%	±%
Democratic	John B. Kendrick	26,324	51.47%	+8.97%
Republican	Clarence D. Clark (incumbent)	23,258	45.47%	−12.03%
Socialist	Paul L. Paulsen	1,334	2.61%	+2.61%
Prohibition	Arthur B. Campbell	231	0.45%	+0.45%
Total votes		'51,057'	'100.00%'	

1922 Wyoming Senate election
Party	Candidate	Votes	%	±%
Democratic	John B. Kendrick (incumbent)	35,734	56.75%	+5.28%
Republican	Frank Wheeler Mondell	26,627	42.28%	−3.19%
Socialist	William B. Guthrie	612	0.97%	−1.64%
Total votes		'62,973'	'100.00%'	

1928 Wyoming Senate election
Party	Candidate	Votes	%	±%
Democratic	John B. Kendrick (incumbent)	43,032	53.50%	−3.25%
Republican	Charles E. Winter	37,076	46.09%	+3.81%
Socialist	W.W. Wolfe	333	0.41%	−0.56%
Total votes		'80,441'	'100.00%'	

== See also ==
- List of members of the United States Congress who died in office (1900–1949)

Party political offices
Preceded by Joseph M. Carey	Democratic nominee for Governor of Wyoming; 1914	Succeeded by Frank L. Houx
First	Democratic nominee for U.S. Senator from Wyoming (Class 1); 1916, 1922, 1928	Succeeded by Joseph C. O'Mahoney
Political offices
Preceded by Joseph M. Carey	Governor of Wyoming; January 4, 1915 – February 26, 1917	Succeeded by Frank L. Houx
U.S. Senate
Preceded by Clarence D. Clark	U.S. Senator (Class 1) from Wyoming; 1917–1933	Succeeded by Joseph C. O'Mahoney
