= 1916 United States Senate election in Wyoming =

- November 7, 1916
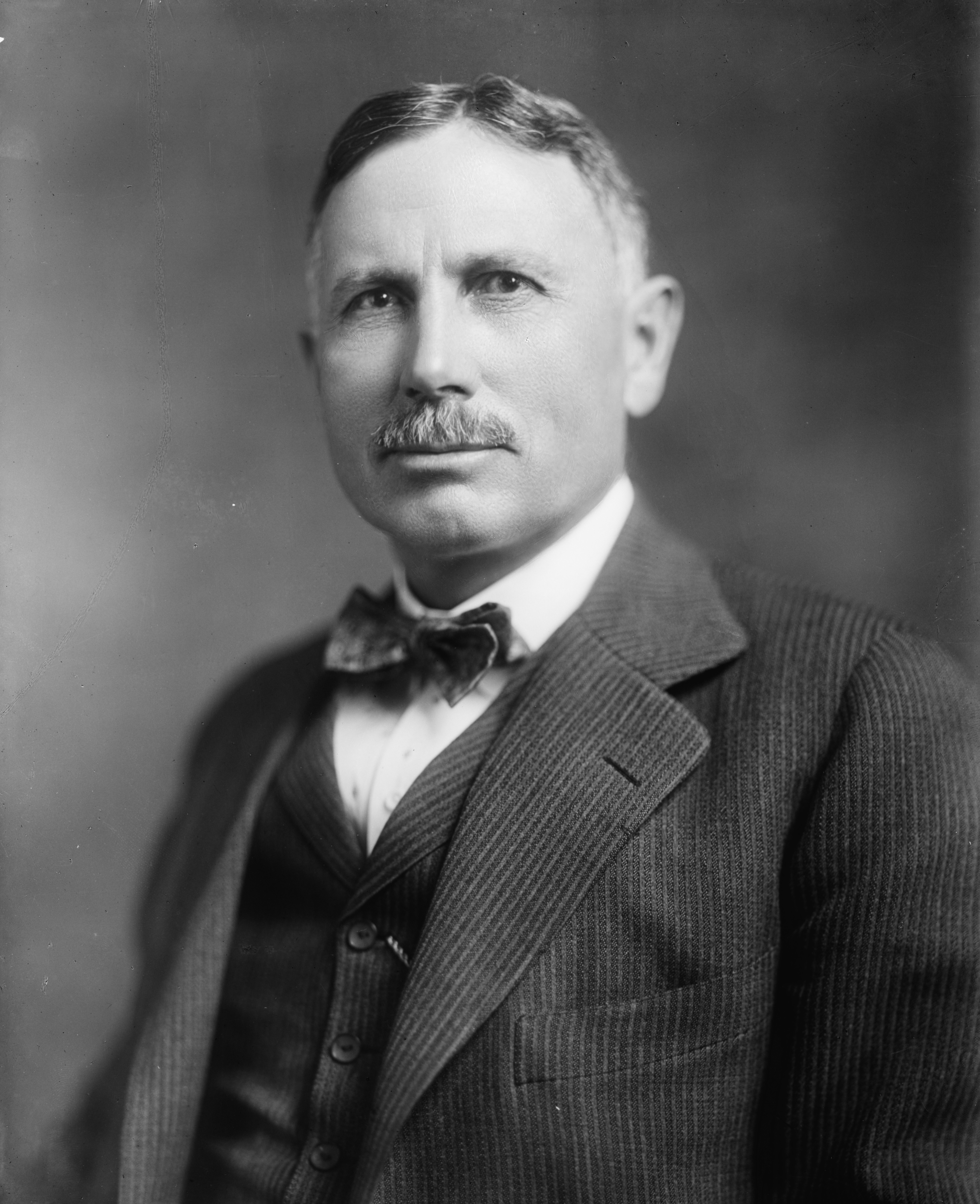

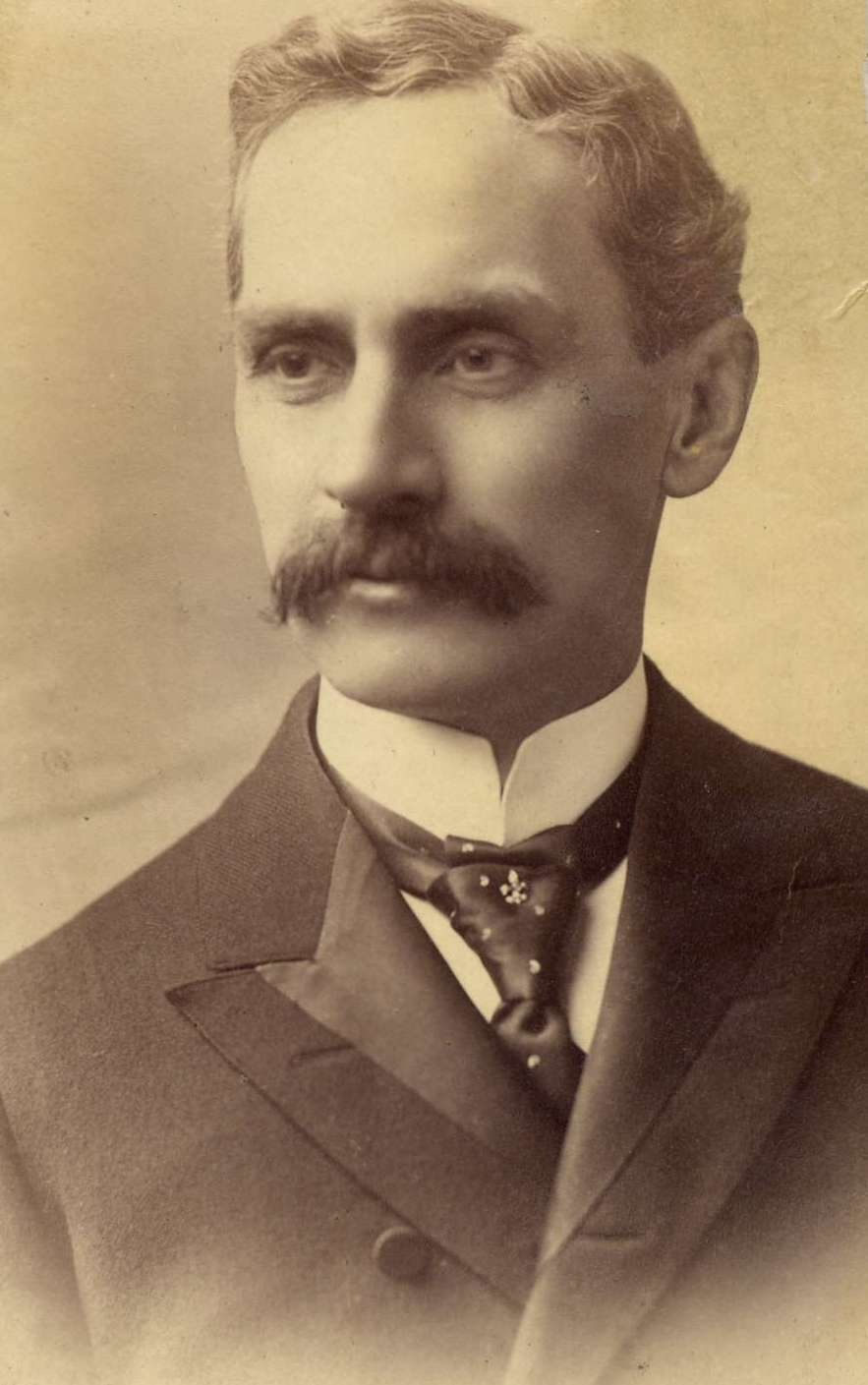
| Nominee | John B. Kendrick | Clarence D. Clark |
| Party | Democratic | Republican |
| Popular vote | 26,324 | 23,258 |
| Percentage | 51.47% | 45.47% |
- County results Kendrick: 40–50% 50–60% Clark: 40–50% 50–60%
U.S. senator before election
Clarence D. Clark
Republican
Elected U.S. Senator
John B. Kendrick
Democratic

The 1916 United States Senate election in Wyoming took place on November 7, 1916. Incumbent senator Clarence D. Clark, a Republican, sought re-election in his first popular election. He was opposed by John B. Kendrick, the incumbent governor of Wyoming and the Democratic nominee. Owing in part to President Woodrow Wilson's strong performance in the presidential election that year, Kendrick won a narrow but decisive victory over Clark, winning the first of three terms in the U.S. Senate.

== Democratic primary ==
=== Candidates ===
- John B. Kendrick, Governor of Wyoming

=== Results ===
Democratic primary
| Party | Candidate | Votes | % |
|---|---|---|---|
| Democratic | John B. Kendrick | 2,877 | 100.00% |
| Total votes | | 2,877 | 100.00% |

== Republican primary ==
=== Candidates ===
- Clarence D. Clark, incumbent U.S. Senator

=== Results ===
Republican primary
| Party | Candidate | Votes | % |
|---|---|---|---|
| Republican | Clarence D. Clark (inc.) | 14,045 | 100.00% |
| Total votes | | 14,045 | 100.00% |

== General election ==
=== Results ===
1916 United States Senate election in Wyoming
| Party | Candidate | Votes | % |
|---|---|---|---|
| Democratic | John B. Kendrick | 26,324 | 51.47% |
| Republican | Clarence D. Clark (inc.) | 23,258 | 45.47% |
| Socialist | Paul L. Paulsen | 1,334 | 2.61% |
| Progressive | Arthur B. Campbell | 231 | 0.45% |
| Total votes | | 51,147 | 100.00% |
| Democratic gain from Republican | | | |
