= William D. Leahy =

United States Navy admiral (1875–1959)

- Leahy, c. 1945

President's Representative to the National Intelligence Authority
- In office January 22, 1946 – July 26, 1947
- President: Harry S. Truman
- Preceded by: Position established
- Succeeded by: Sidney Souers (Executive Secretary of the U.S. National Security Council)

Chief of Staff to the Commander in Chief
- In office 20 July 1942 – 21 March 1949
- President: Franklin D. Roosevelt; Harry S. Truman
- Preceded by: Position established
- Succeeded by: Omar Bradley (Chairman of the Joint Chiefs of Staff)

United States Ambassador to France
- In office 8 January 1941 – 1 May 1942
- President: Franklin D. Roosevelt
- Preceded by: William Christian Bullitt Jr.
- Succeeded by: Jefferson Caffery

Governor of Puerto Rico
- In office 11 September 1939 – 28 November 1940
- President: Franklin D. Roosevelt
- Preceded by: Blanton Winship
- Succeeded by: Rexford Tugwell

Chief of Naval Operations
- In office 2 January 1937 – 1 August 1939
- President: Franklin D. Roosevelt
- Preceded by: William Harrison Standley
- Succeeded by: Harold Rainsford Stark

Personal details
- Born: William Daniel Leahy; 6 May 1875 Hampton, Iowa, U.S.
- Died: 20 July 1959 (aged 84) Bethesda, Maryland, U.S.
- Resting place: Arlington National Cemetery
- Spouse: Louise Tennent Harrington (m. 1904; died 1942)
- Children: William Harrington Leahy
- Education: United States Naval Academy

Military service
- Allegiance: United States
- Branch/service: United States Navy
- Years of service: 1893–1959
- Rank: Fleet Admiral
- Commands: Chief of Staff to the Commander in Chief; Chief of Naval Operations; Battleships Battle Force; USS New Mexico; USS Shawmut; USS St. Louis; USS Chattanooga; USS Princess Matoika; USS Dolphin; USS Mariveles
- Battles/wars: Spanish–American War; Philippine–American War; Boxer Rebellion; World War I; Occupation of Nicaragua; Occupation of Haiti; Occupation of the Dominican Republic; World War II
- Awards: Navy Cross; Navy Distinguished Service Medal (3)

William Daniel Leahy (/ˈleɪ(h)i/ LAY-(h)ee; 6 May 1875 – 20 July 1959) was an American naval officer and was the most senior United States military officer on active duty during World War II; he held several titles and exercised considerable influence over foreign and military policy. As a fleet admiral, he was the first flag officer ever to hold a five-star rank in the U.S. Armed Forces.

An 1897 graduate of the United States Naval Academy, Leahy saw active service in the Spanish–American War, the Philippine–American War, the Boxer Rebellion in China, the Banana Wars in Central America, and World War I. He was the first member of his cadet class to reach flag rank, as the Chief of the Bureau of Ordnance from 1927 to 1931. He subsequently served as Chief of the Bureau of Navigation from 1933 to 1936, and commanded the Battle Fleet from 1936 to 1937. As Chief of Naval Operations from 1937 to 1939, he was the senior officer in the United States Navy, overseeing the expansion of the fleet and preparations for war.

After retiring from the Navy, Leahy was appointed the governor of Puerto Rico in 1939 by President Franklin D. Roosevelt. In his most controversial role, he served as the Ambassador to France from 1940 to 1942. American policy was aimed at keeping the government of Vichy France free of German control, but Leahy had limited success and came to believe the United States should back Free France instead of Vichy France. He asked to be recalled to the United States after the Japanese attack on Pearl Harbor brought the United States into the Second World War.

Leahy was recalled to active duty and became the Chief of Staff to President Roosevelt in 1942, serving in that position for the rest of the war. As the de facto first Chairman of the Joint Chiefs of Staff, he oversaw all of the American armed forces and was a major decision-maker during the war. He also presided over the American delegation to the Combined Chiefs of Staff. In December 1944, he was promoted to the five-star rank of fleet admiral. In the aftermath of World War II, he served Roosevelt's successor Harry S. Truman, helping shape postwar foreign policy until he retired in 1949. Although he did not oppose the use of the nuclear weapons during the war, in the post-war period he rejected war plans that overemphasised the first use of nuclear weapons.

== Early life and education ==
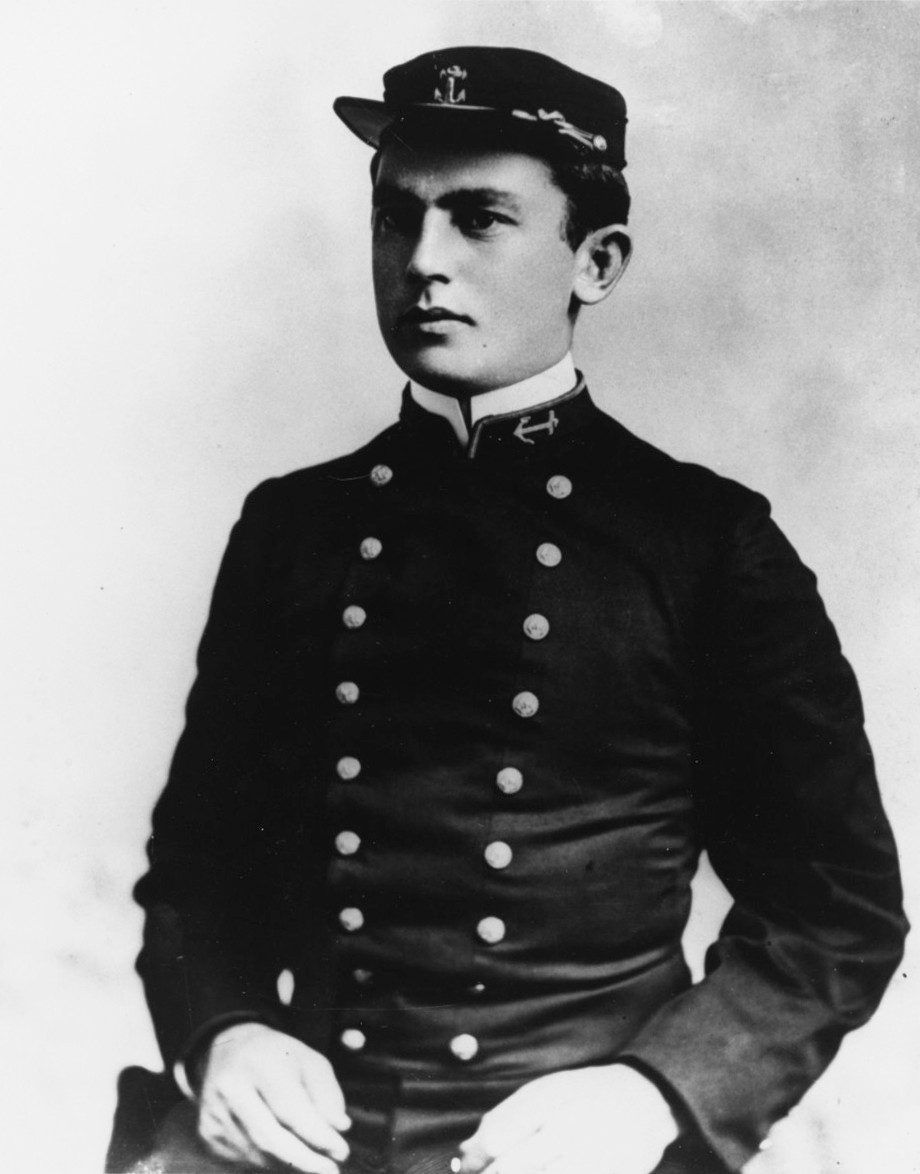
As a naval cadet

William Daniel Leahy was born in Hampton, Iowa, on 6 May 1875, the first of seven children of Michael Anthony Leahy, a lawyer and American Civil War veteran, who was elected to the Iowa Legislature in 1872, and his wife Rose Mary née Hamilton. Both parents were born in the United States but his grandparents were immigrants from Ireland. He had five brothers and a sister. His father was re-elected in 1874, but moved to Wausau, Wisconsin, in 1882. In 1889, the family moved again, this time to Ashland, Wisconsin, where Leahy attended high school. His nose was broken in an American football match and his family lacked the money to get it fixed, so it remained crooked for the rest of his life.

Leahy wanted to attend the United States Military Academy at West Point, New York, but this required a congressional appointment, and Leahy was unable to secure one. His local congressman, Thomas Lynch, offered Leahy an appointment to the United States Naval Academy in Annapolis, Maryland, which was much less popular among boys in the landlocked Midwest. Leahy passed the entrance examinations and was admitted as a naval cadet in May 1893.

Leahy learned how to sail on the USS Constellation on a summer cruise to Europe, although the vessel only made it as far as the Azores before breaking down. He graduated 35th out of 47 in the class of 1897. His class was the most successful ever: Five of its members reached four-star rank while on active duty: Leahy, Thomas C. Hart, Arthur J. Hepburn, Orin G. Murfin, and Harry E. Yarnell. As of 2022, no other class has had more than four.

== Naval service ==
=== Spanish–American War ===
Until 1912, naval cadets graduating from Annapolis had to complete two years' duty at sea and pass examinations before they could be commissioned as ensigns. Leahy was assigned to the battleship USS Oregon, which was then at Vancouver, British Columbia, for celebrations of Queen Victoria's Diamond Jubilee. He was on board when she made a dash through the Strait of Magellan, and around South America in the spring of 1898 to participate in the Spanish–American War. The Oregon took part in the blockade and bombardment of Santiago and shelled the small town of Guantánamo, which Leahy felt was "unnecessary and cruel." In the Battle of Santiago on 3 July, Leahy was in command of the ship's forward turret. This was the only naval battle Leahy witnessed in person.

Seeking further action, Leahy volunteered to serve on the gunboat USS Castine. The ship was bound for the war in the Pacific, traveling via the Mediterranean Sea and Suez Canal, but he got only as far as Ceylon when he received orders to report to Annapolis for his final ensign's examinations. He was left at Ceylon, and had to return to the United States on the USS Buffalo. He reached Annapolis in June 1899. He passed his examinations, and was commissioned as an ensign on 1 July 1899. After a few weeks' leave, spent with his parents in Wisconsin, and a few months' service on the cruiser USS Philadelphia at the Mare Island Navy Yard, he joined the monitor USS Nevada on 12 October 1899. A week later it set sail for the Philippines. It arrived in Manila on 24 November, and Leahy rejoined the crew of the Castine five days later.

=== China and Philippine–American Wars ===
On 17 December 1899, Castine sailed for Nagasaki, but it developed engine trouble on 12 February 1900 and stopped in Shanghai to make repairs. While it was there, the Boxer Rebellion broke out in China; the ship was retained in Shanghai to help British, French and Japanese forces guard the city. Leahy did not like their chances if the 4,500 Chinese troops in the vicinity joined the uprising, as they had in the Battle of Tientsin. On 28 August, the Castine was ordered to Amoy to protect American interests in fear of a Japanese coup. After the threat had passed, the Castine returned to the Philippines, arriving back in Manila on 16 September 1900.

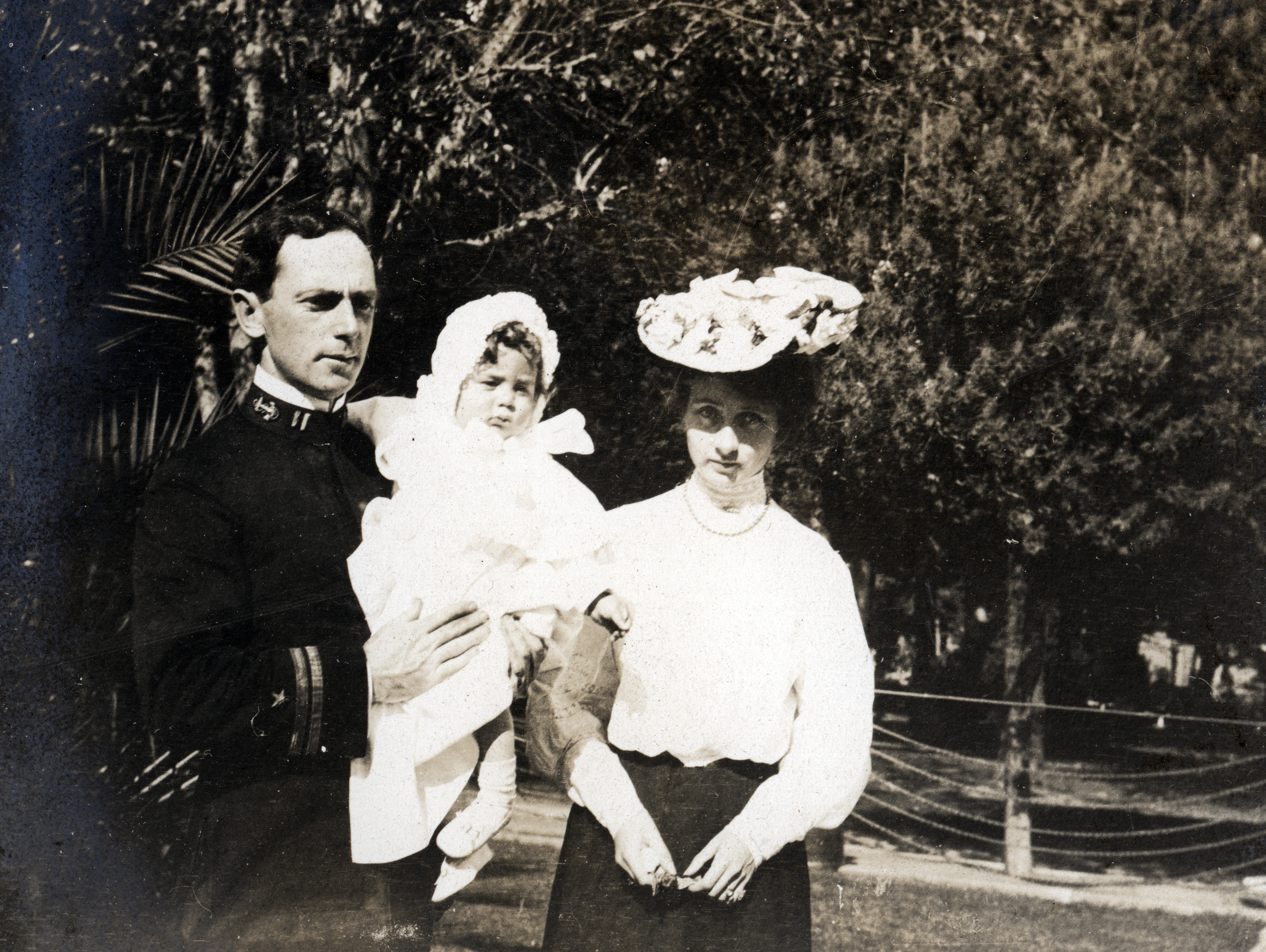
With wife Louise and son William Harrington Leahy at Mare Island, California, in October 1905

The Philippine–American War was still ongoing, and the Castine supported American operations on Marinduque and Iloilo. Leahy was appalled by American brutality and the widespread use of torture. Still an ensign, he was given his first command, the gunboat USS Mariveles, a refitted ex-Spanish vessel. It had a crew of 23. His period in command ended when the Mariveles lost one of its propellers and had to be laid up for repairs. He was then reassigned to the USS Glacier, a stores ship which was engaged in bringing supplies from Australia to the Philippines. While in the Philippines he passed the examinations required for promotion to lieutenant, junior grade, and was promoted to that rank on 1 July 1902. He made his final trip to the Philippines in September 1902, and returned to the United States later that year.

Sea duty alternated with duty ashore. Leahy was assigned to the training ship USS Pensacola in San Francisco, where he was promoted to lieutenant on 31 December 1903. He met and courted Louise Tennent Harrington. Leahy married Louise on 3 February 1904. Louise subsequently convinced him to convert to Episcopalianism.

Leahy helped commission the cruiser USS Tacoma but swapped assignments with an officer on the USS Boston so that he could remain in San Francisco with Louise, who was pregnant. Over the next two years the Boston cruised back and forth between San Francisco and Panama, where the Panama Canal was under construction. He was in Acapulco when their son and only child, William Harrington Leahy, was born on 27 October 1904, and did not see his son until five months later. He was present for the 1906 San Francisco earthquake. His family had to leave their house in the face of the resulting fires. It survived undamaged, although they had to live in a hotel for several months before they could return.

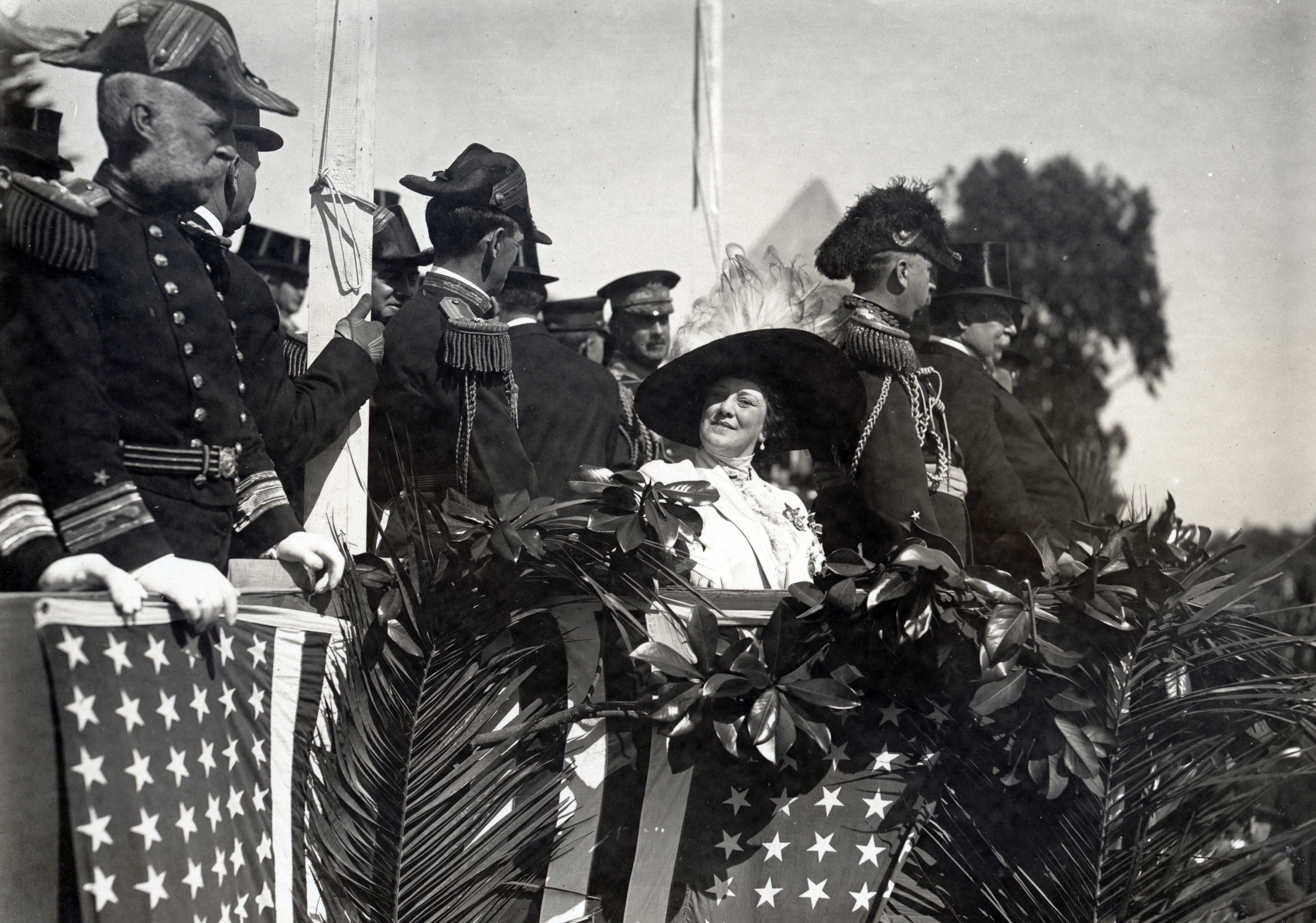
President William H. Taft reviews a parade in San Francisco, California, 14 October 1911. Left to right: Rear Admiral Chauncey Thomas Jr., Leahy, Lillian Nordica, Archibald Butt and President Taft.

On 22 February 1907, Leahy returned to Annapolis as instructor in the department of physics and chemistry. He also coached the academy rifle team. After two years ashore, he received orders on 14 August 1909, to return to San Francisco and sea duty as navigator of the armored cruiser USS California, commanded by Captain Henry T. Mayo, in whom Leahy found a patron and a role model. In September, the California was one of eight ships that paid an official visit to Japan, where Leahy saw Admiral Heihachirō Tōgō. Mayo switched Leahy's assignment from navigator to gunnery officer.

Leahy was promoted to lieutenant commander on 15 September 1909, and in January 1911, the commander-in-chief of the Pacific Fleet, Rear Admiral Chauncey Thomas Jr., chose him as his fleet gunnery officer. In October, the California returned to San Francisco for a fleet review in honor of President William Howard Taft, and Leahy served as Taft's temporary naval aide for four days.

=== Banana Wars ===
Rear Admiral William H. H. Southerland succeeded Thomas as commander of the Pacific Fleet on 21 April 1912. The California sailed to Manila and then to Japan before returning to San Francisco on 15 August. A few weeks later, Southerland received orders to proceed to Nicaragua and be prepared to deploy a landing force for the United States occupation of Nicaragua. Along with his duties as gunnery officer, Leahy became the chief of staff of the expeditionary force and the commander of the small garrison at Corinto, Nicaragua. He came under fire while repeatedly escorting reinforcements and supplies over the railroad line to León. Privately, he thought that the United States was backing the wrong side, propping up a conservative elite who were exploiting the Nicaraguan people.

In October 1912, Leahy came ashore in Washington, D.C., as assistant director of gunnery exercises and engineering competitions. Then, in 1913, Mayo had him assigned to the Bureau of Navigation as a detail officer. Mayo and then his replacement, Rear Admiral William Fullam, were reassigned, leaving Leahy as the acting chief of the bureau. It was one of the Navy's most sensitive offices, as it controlled officer assignments. Leahy's wife Louise enjoyed the social milieu of Washington, and socialized with Addie Daniels, the wife of Josephus Daniels, the Secretary of the Navy. Leahy established a close friendship with the Assistant Secretary of the Navy, Franklin D. Roosevelt.

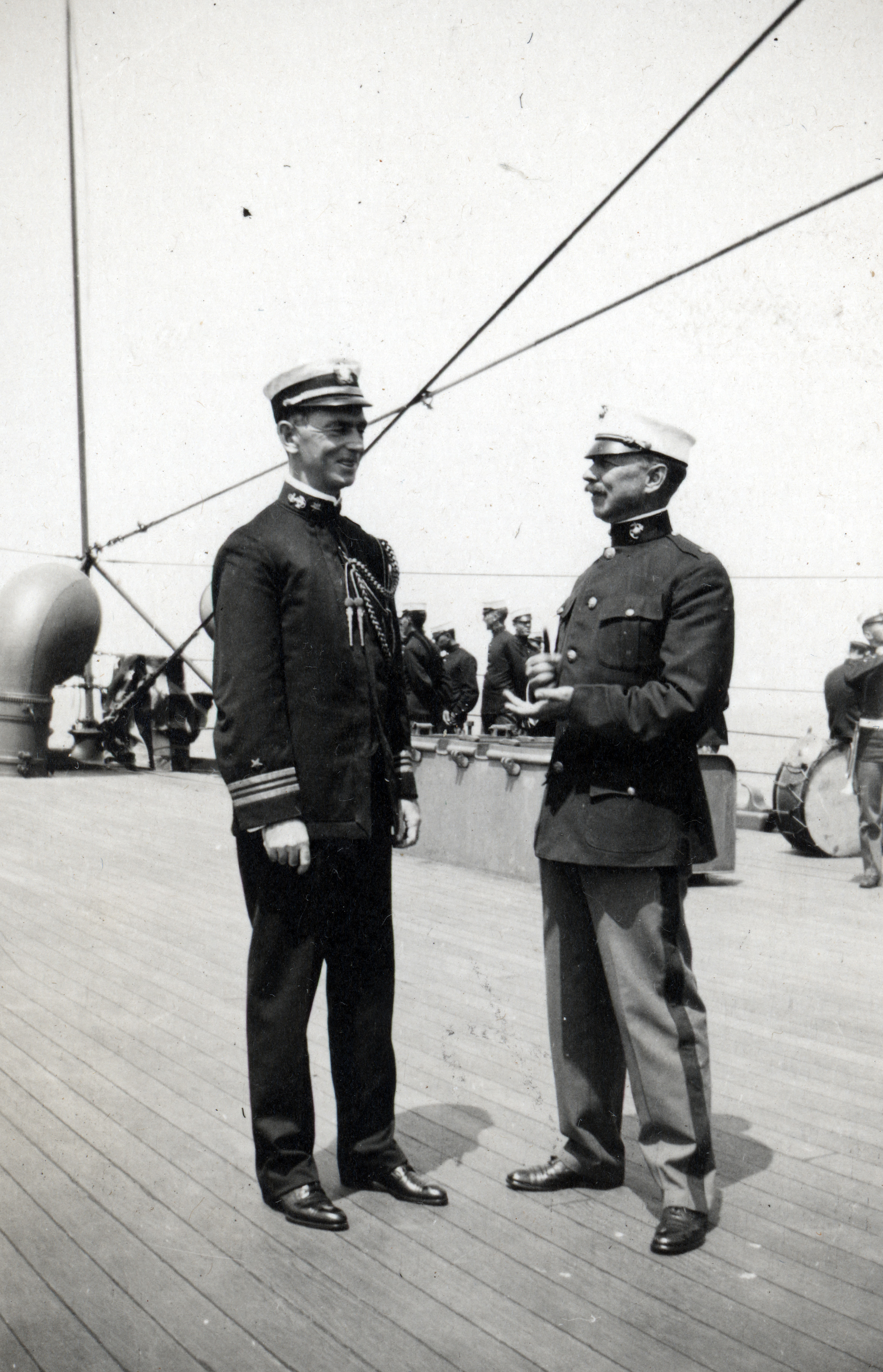
With Major C. S. Hill (right) on the deck of the USS California in August 1912

As Leahy's three-year tour of shore duty approached its end in 1915, he hoped to command the new destroyer tender USS Melville but Daniels had the assignment changed to command of the Secretary of the Navy's dispatch gunboat, the USS Dolphin. Leahy assumed command of the Dolphin on 18 September 1915. The ship took part in the United States occupation of Haiti, where Leahy again acted as chief of staff, this time to Rear Admiral William B. Caperton. In May 1916, Dolphin participated in the occupation of the Dominican Republic too. During the summer, Roosevelt used it as his family yacht, cruising down the Hudson River from the Roosevelt family estate in Hyde Park, New York, and along the coast to his holiday house on Campobello Island. Leahy was promoted to commander on 29 August 1916.

=== World War I ===
Following the United States entry into World War I In April 1917, Dolphin was sent to the United States Virgin Islands to assert America's control there. There was a rumor that a Danish-flagged freighter in the vicinity, the Nordskov, was a German merchant raider in disguise, and Dolphin was sent to investigate. If it had been, Leahy would have been outgunned, but an inspection determined that the rumors were false. In July 1917, Leahy became the executive officer of USS Nevada. It was the Navy's newest battleship, but it was not sent to Europe due to teething troubles with its new design and a shortage of fuel oil in Britain.

In April 1918 Leahy assumed command of a troop transport, the USS Princess Matoika. Shortly before it was due to depart for France, Leahy was summoned to Washington, D.C., by the Chief of Naval Operations (CNO), Admiral William S. Benson, who offered him the position of the Navy's director of gunnery. Leahy told him that he wanted to remain on the Princess Matoika. A compromise was reached; Leahy was permitted to cross the Atlantic once before becoming director of gunnery. Traveling in convoy, the Princess Matoika reached Brest on 23 May 1918, and disembarked its troops. Leahy was awarded the Navy Cross "for distinguished service in the line of his profession as commanding officer of the USS Princess Matoika, engaged in the important, exacting and hazardous duty of transporting and escorting troops and supplies to European ports through waters infested with enemy submarines and mines during World War I."

Leahy returned to the United States, where he was promoted to captain on 1 July 1918, and soon after was on his way back to Europe to confer with representatives of the Royal Navy and discuss their gunnery practices. He reached London later that month, where he reported to the U.S. Navy commander in Europe, Vice Admiral William S. Sims, who had been a critic of the Navy's gunnery in the Spanish-American War. Leahy met with his British counterpart, Captain Frederic Dreyer, and the chief gunnery officer of the Anglo-American Grand Fleet, Captain Ernle Chatfield.

Leahy was attached to the staff of Rear Admiral Hugh Rodman, the commander of the American division of the Grand Fleet, and was able to view a gunnery exercise from the British battleship HMS Queen Elizabeth. On the way home he visited Paris, where he was appalled at the German use of a long-range gun to bombard the city, which he considered an indiscriminate targeting of civilians and militarily useless. He embarked for home on the SS Leviathan at Brest on 12 August 1918.

=== Sea duty between the wars ===
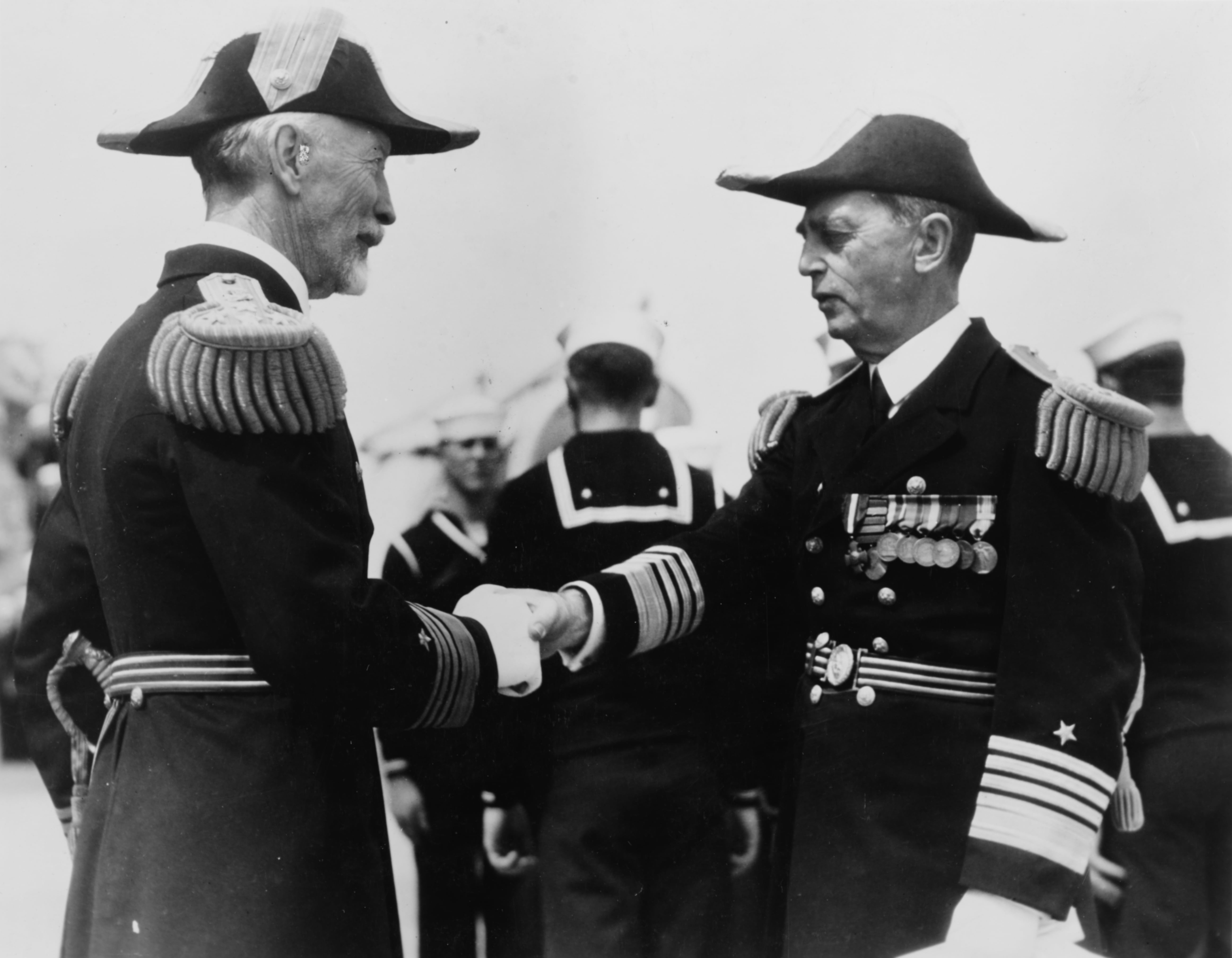
Leahy shakes hands with Admiral Joseph M. Reeves (left) on assuming command of the Battle Force in June 1936.

In February 1921, Leahy sailed for Europe, where he assumed command of the cruiser USS Chattanooga on 2 April. In May he was ordered to take command of the cruiser USS St. Louis, the flagship of the naval detachment in Turkish waters during the Greco-Turkish War. He was able to spend a couple of weeks in the French countryside with Louise, who spoke fluent French, before taking the Orient Express to Constantinople, where he reported to the American commander there, Rear Admiral Mark L. Bristol, on 30 May. Leahy had the role of safeguarding American interests in Turkey. He had to play the diplomat, attending parties and receptions, and organizing American events. He reveled in this assignment.

The next step in a successful naval career would normally have been to attend the Naval War College. Leahy submitted repeated requests but was never sent. At the end of 1921, he was given command of the minelayer USS Shawmut and concurrent command of Mine Squadron One. He then returned to Washington, D.C., where he served as director of Officer Personnel in the Bureau of Navigation from 1923 to 1926. After three years of shore duty, he was given command of the battleship USS New Mexico. In biennial competitions in gunnery, engineering and battle efficiency, the New Mexico won all three in 1927–1928.

=== Flag officer ===
On 14 October 1927, Leahy reached flag rank, the first member of his cadet class to do so, and returned to Washington as the Chief of the Bureau of Ordnance. The following year he bought a town house on Florida Avenue near Dupont Circle for $20,000 (equivalent to $300,000 in 2025). He also had assets that he had acquired through his marriage to Louise: stocks in the Colusa County Bank and agricultural land in the Sacramento Valley in California. In the wake of the Wall Street crash of 1929, President Herbert Hoover determined to effect cuts in the Navy's budget, and his representative, Rear Admiral William V. Pratt, negotiated the London Naval Treaty that limited naval construction. The list of canceled ships included two aircraft carriers, three cruisers, a destroyer and six submarines. Leahy was in charge of implementing these cuts, and he was appalled at the human toll; some 5,000 workers lost their jobs, many of them highly skilled shipyard workers who faced long-term unemployment during the Great Depression.

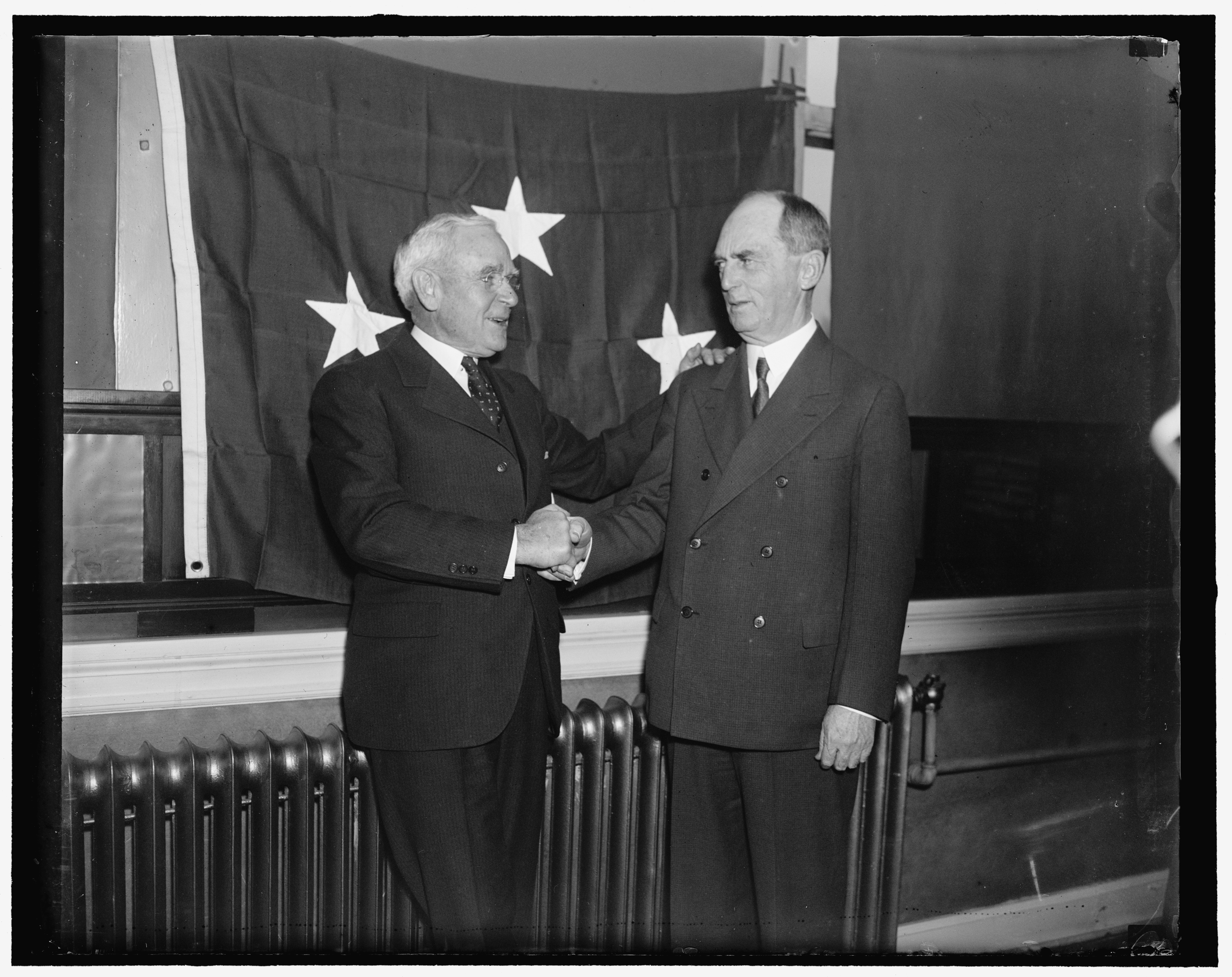
Leahy and Admiral William H. Standley shake hands after Leahy is sworn in as the Chief of Naval Operations in Washington, D.C., in January 1937.

Admiral Charles F. Hughes elected to retire rather than enforce the cuts, and he was replaced by Pratt. Pratt and Leahy soon clashed over cuts to shipbuilding, and Pratt attempted to have Leahy reassigned as chief of staff of the Pacific Fleet. Leahy had the Chief of the Bureau of Navigation block this, but decided that it would be in his best interest to get away from Pratt, and he secured command of the destroyers of the Scouting Force on the West Coast in 1931. Leahy's dislike of Hoover was intensified by his dire personal circumstances. He could not find a tenant for the Florida Avenue property at a rent that would pay for its upkeep; the price of food had fallen so much that his land in the Sacramento Valley could not generate a profit, and was seized by the government to recover unpaid taxes; and a run on the bank in January 1933 caused the Colusa County Bank to close its doors, taking with it Leahy's life savings, and leaving him with a large debt that he would not pay off until 1941.

Roosevelt was inaugurated as president on 4 March 1933, and he nominated Leahy as the Chief of the Bureau of Navigation. On 6 May 1933, Leahy and Louise boarded a train back to Washington, D.C. As bureau chief, Leahy handled personnel matters with care and consideration. When his successor as the Chief of the Bureau of Ordnance, Rear Admiral Edgar B. Larimer, suffered a mental breakdown and was hospitalized, Leahy ensured that he was kept on the active list until he reached retirement age, thereby safeguarding his pension. When two midshipmen at Annapolis, John Hyland and Victor Krulak, faced expulsion for failing to reach the required minimum height of 5 feet 6 inches (168 cm), Leahy waived the regulations to permit them to graduate with the class of 1934, and both went on to have distinguished careers.

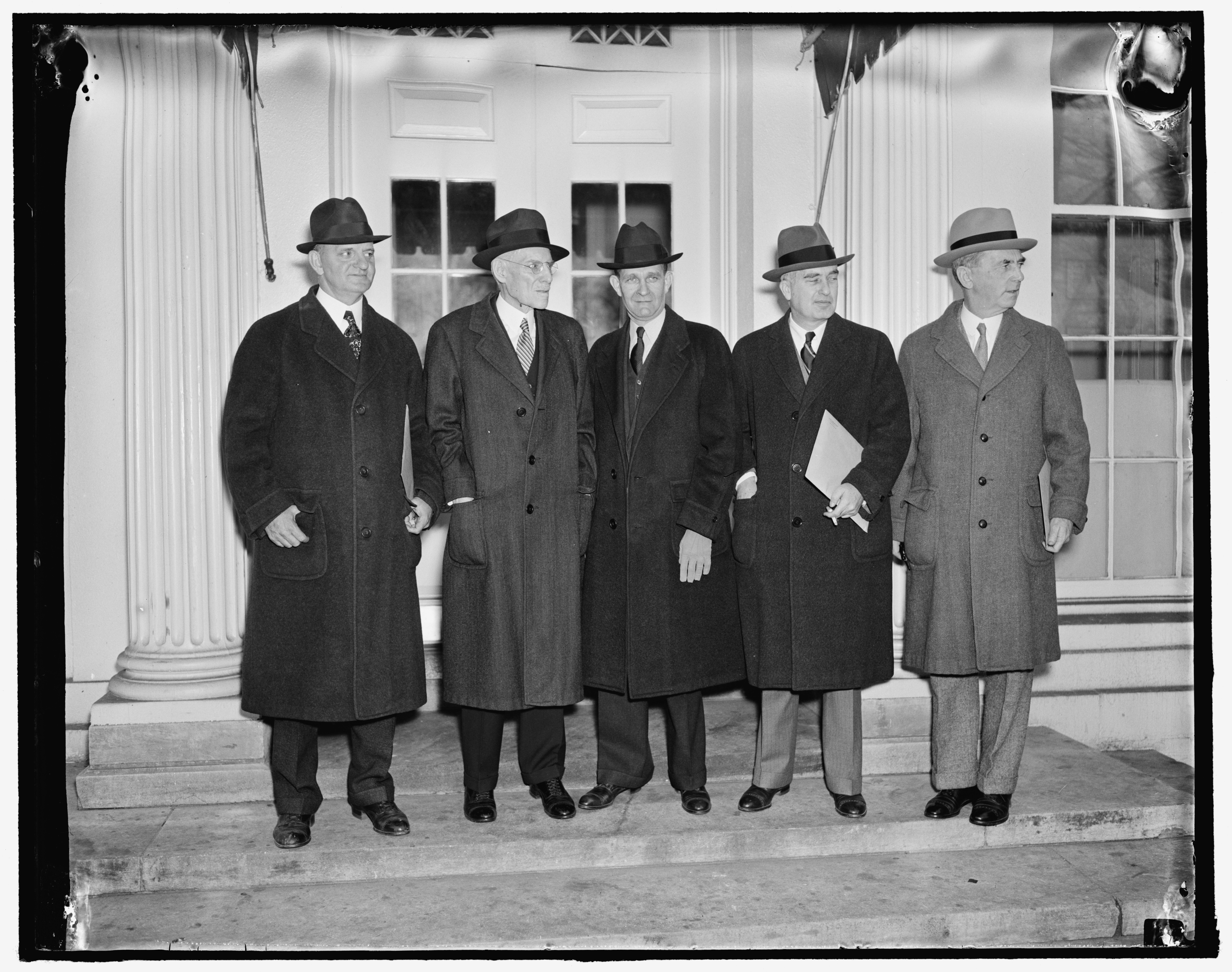
Discussing naval expansion with Congressmen and the President in Washington, D.C., on 5 January 1938: (left to right) Carl Vinson, Edward T. Taylor, William B. Umstead, Charles Edison and Leahy

Leahy formed a good working relationship with the new Assistant Secretary of the Navy, Henry L. Roosevelt, an Annapolis graduate and distant cousin of the President whom Leahy considered a close personal friend, but he clashed with the new CNO, Admiral William H. Standley, who sought to assert the power of the CNO over the bureau chiefs. In this he was opposed by Leahy and the Chief of the Bureau of Aeronautics, Rear Admiral Ernest J. King, who enlisted the aid of Henry Roosevelt and the Secretary of the Navy, Claude A. Swanson, to block it. In 1936, the commander-in-chief United States Fleet (CINCUS), Admiral Joseph M. Reeves recommended Leahy for the position of Commander Battleships Battle Force, with the rank of vice admiral. Standley was opposed to this, but was unable to persuade Swanson or the President, who invited Leahy to a private chat at the White House before proceeding to take up his new posting.

Leahy assumed his new command on 13 July 1935. In October Roosevelt came out to California for the California Pacific International Exposition. Leahy treated him to the largest fleet maneuver the U.S. Navy had ever carried out, with 129 warships, including 12 battleships, participating, which the President observed from the deck of the cruiser USS Houston. On 30 March 1936, Leahy was promoted to the temporary rank of admiral and hoisted his four-star flag on the battleship USS California as Commander Battle Force. One of his last acts in this post was a symbolic one: he transferred his flag to the aircraft carrier USS Ranger as a sign of his conviction that aircraft were now an integral part of sea power.

=== Chief of Naval Operations ===
In December 1935, Swanson told Leahy in confidence that he would be appointed the next CNO if Roosevelt won the 1936 presidential election. Roosevelt won the election with a landslide victory, and on 10 November 1936, it was announced that Leahy would succeed Standley as CNO on 1 January 1937. As CNO, Leahy was content to let the bureau chiefs function as they always had, acting as a primus inter pares. Swanson was chronically ill, and Henry Roosevelt died on 22 February 1936. Charles Edison became the new assistant secretary, but he lacked experience in naval affairs.

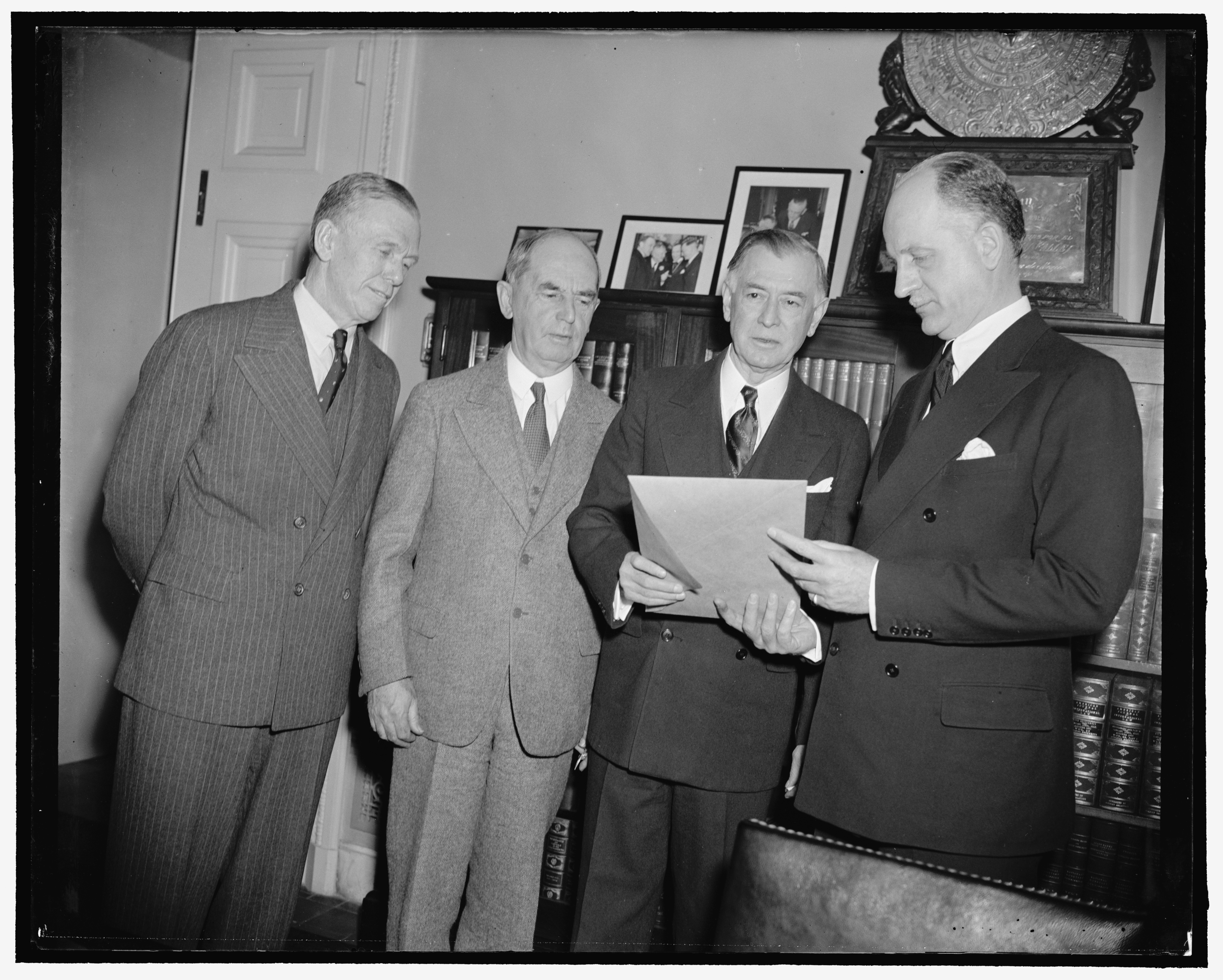
Appearing before the Senate Foreign Relations Committee in Washington, D.C., on 22 March 1939, in support of military aid to the Latin American republics: (left to right) George C. Marshall, Leahy, Key Pittman and Sumner Welles

Leahy began representing the Navy in cabinet meetings. He met with the President frequently; during his tenure as CNO, Roosevelt had 52 meetings with Leahy, compared with twelve with his Army counterpart, General Malin Craig, and none of the meetings with Craig were private lunches. Meetings between Leahy and Roosevelt were sometimes on matters unrelated to the Navy, and they frequently went on for hours. At one private lunch on 15 April 1937, Leahy and Roosevelt debated whether new battleships should have 16-inch (410 mm) or (cheaper) 14-inch (360 mm) guns. Leahy ultimately persuaded the President that the new North Carolina-class battleships should have 16-inch guns. On 22 May, Leahy accompanied the President and dignitaries including John Nance Garner, Harry Hopkins, James F. Byrnes, Morris Sheppard, Edwin C. Johnson, Claude Pepper and Sam Rayburn on a cruise on the presidential yacht USS Potomac to watch a baseball game between congressmen and the press.

The most important issue confronting the administration was how to respond to the Japanese invasion of China. The commander-in-chief of the Asiatic Fleet, Admiral Harry Yarnell, asked for four more cruisers to help evacuate American citizens from the Shanghai International Settlement, but the Secretary of State, Cordell Hull, thought this would be too provocative. Leahy went to Hyde Park to take the matter up with Roosevelt. The request was turned down: American isolationist sentiment was too strong to countenance the risk of being drawn into the conflict; Yarnell could use merchant ships, if he could find them. Leahy accepted this presidential decision, as he always did, even when he strongly disagreed. Leahy wrote in his diary that a Japanese threat to bomb the civilian population in China was "evidence, and a conclusive one, that the old accepted rules of warfare are no longer in effect."

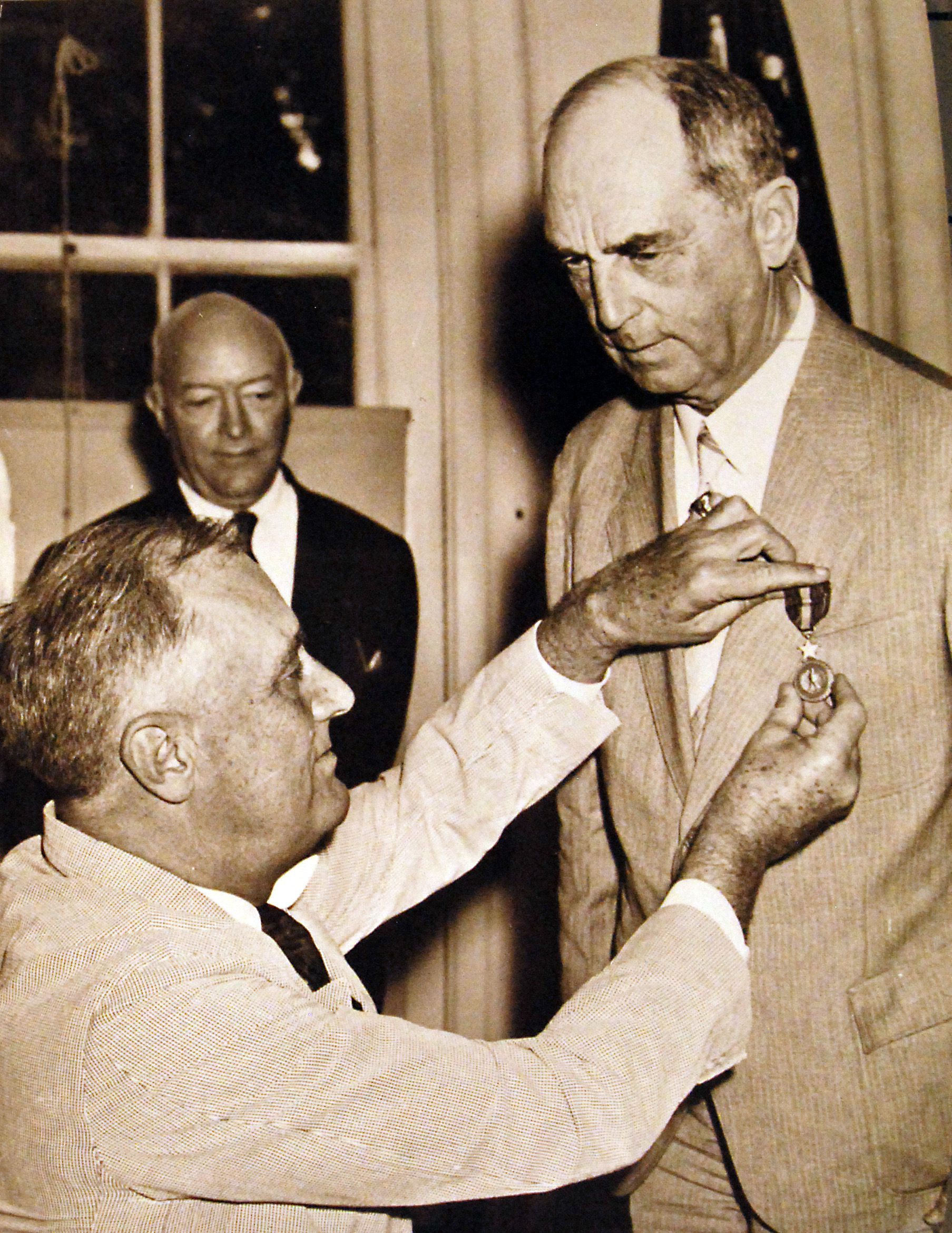
Roosevelt presents Leahy with the Navy Distinguished Service Medal on 28 July 1939.

On 12 December, Leahy was informed of the USS Panay incident, in which an American gunboat on the Yangtze River had been sunk by Japanese aircraft. He met with Hull to craft a response, and discussed the matter with Roosevelt on 14 December. Leahy saw the Panay incident as a test of American resolve. He wanted to answer it with a show of force, economic sanctions and a naval blockade of Japan. But among Roosevelt's advisors, he was the only one willing to countenance such a drastic step. Roosevelt agreed with him, but with uncertain midterm elections coming up in 1938 he felt he could not afford to antagonize the pacifists and isolationists. The Japanese apology therefore was accepted.

The Panay incident did prompt Roosevelt and Leahy to press ahead with plans for an ambitious shipbuilding program. On 5 January, Roosevelt, Leahy and Edison met with Congressman Carl Vinson to draw up a strategy for obtaining Congressional approval for a 20 percent increase in all classes of warships. The resulting Second Vinson Act was approved in May 1938, and provided for four more Iowa-class battleships. Leahy had not thought it worthwhile to build more aircraft carriers, but five were added to what became the Two-Ocean Navy Act, together with five Montana-class battleships. Leahy pushed for the construction of 24 Cimarron-class oilers, which would be needed to project American sea power across the Pacific. Leahy joined Louise when she sponsored the first of these, the USS Cimarron, which was commissioned on 20 March 1939.

Roosevelt threw a surprise party for Leahy on 28 July 1939, during which he presented him with the Navy Distinguished Service Medal. According to Leahy, Roosevelt said: "Bill, if we have a war, you're going to be right back here helping me run it." To make this easier, legislation was expedited to keep Leahy on the active list for another two years. On 1 August 1939, Admiral Harold Stark replaced Leahy as CNO.

== Government service ==
=== Governor of Puerto Rico ===
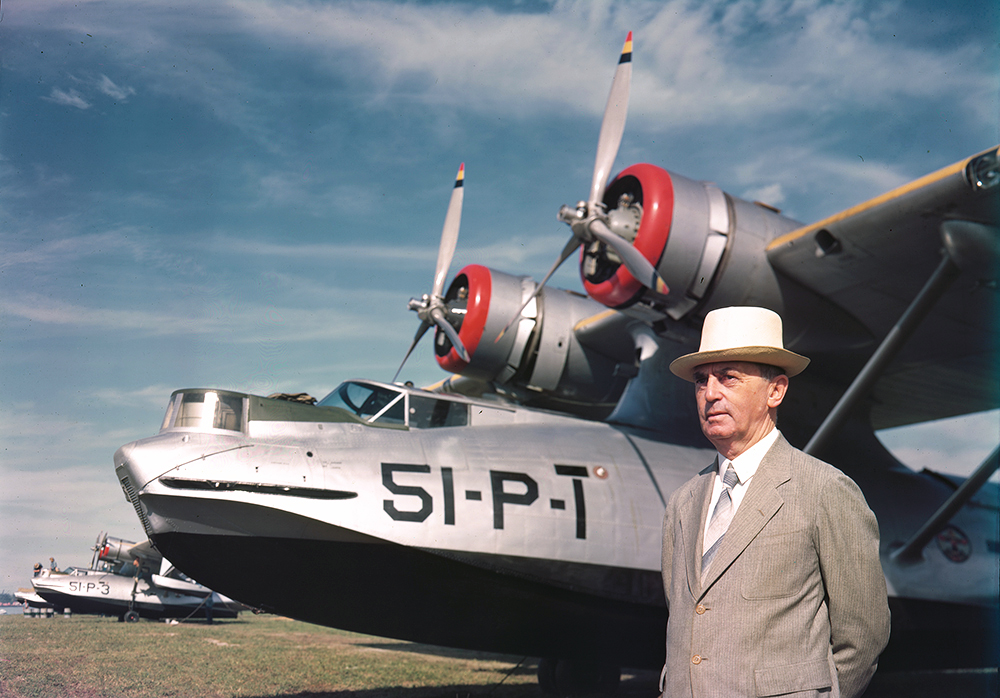
As governor of Puerto Rico in 1939

From September 1939 to November 1940, Leahy served as Governor of Puerto Rico after Roosevelt removed Blanton Winship for his role in the Ponce massacre. Winship had aligned himself with the Coalición, a pro-American electoral alliance that represented the interests of the island's wealthy elite and American sugar corporations. Roosevelt gave Leahy the objectives of developing and upgrading base installations, and of alleviating the extreme poverty and inequality. Leahy was given $10 million (equivalent to $179 million in 2025) in addition to funds already earmarked for the island and extraordinary latitude in spending it. He was also named as the head of the Puerto Rican office of the Works Progress Administration (WPA), which gave him control over New Deal funding. In October 1939, he also became the head of the Puerto Rico Cement Corporation to help it secure a $700,000 loan (equivalent to $13 million in 2025) from the Federal government's Reconstruction Finance Corporation (RFC), and in December he became the head of the Puerto Rican branch of the RFC. His power was enhanced by his direct access to the President and the Secretary of the interior, Harold L. Ickes.

Although given the unflattering sobriquet Almirante Lija ("Admiral Sandpaper") by locals, based on his surname, Luis Muñoz Marín came to regard Leahy as "by far the best governor that has been sent to Puerto Rico since the beginning of the American Regime." Leahy took an open stance of not intervening directly in the politics of Puerto Rico, although he remained involved in federal politics, doing what he could to support Roosevelt's 1940 reelection. He attempted to understand and respect local customs, and initiated major public works projects. Although his priority was developing Puerto Rico as a military base, over half the WPA funds were spent on public works such as roads and improving sanitation. He regulated prices and production in the coffee industry, and had ships traveling between the United States and the Panama Canal, where major upgrade works were being undertaken, stop over in Puerto Rico when they needed repairs or supplies. In December 1939 he met with Roosevelt and secured another $100 million in WPA funding (equivalent to $1.8 billion in 2025) for public works, which allowed him to hire another 20,000 workers. By awarding lucrative government contracts and appointing officials based on Roosevelt's preferences rather than those of the local elite, he soon earned the enmity of the Coalición.

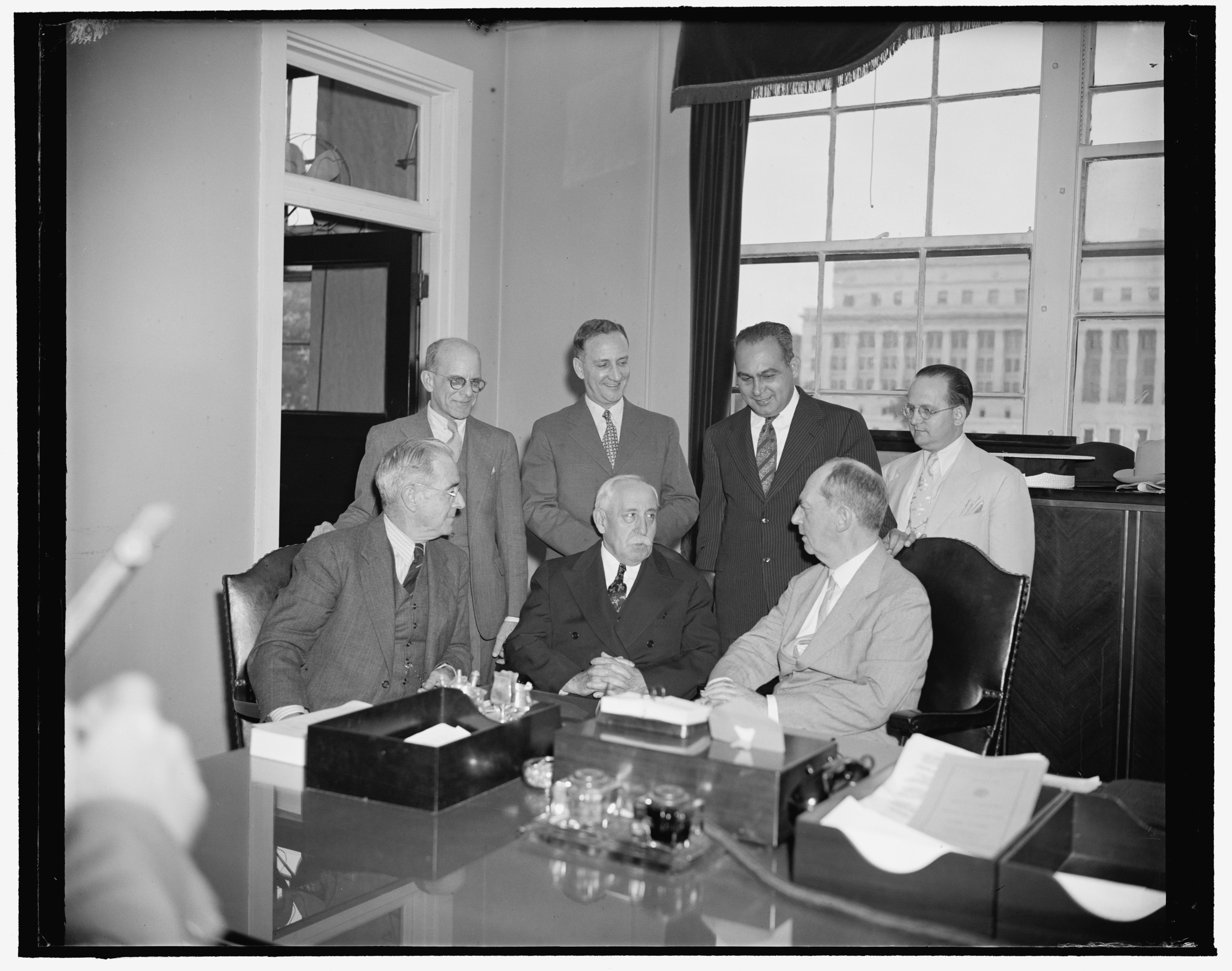
Conferring with Puerto Rican officials: (front, left to right) Rafael Martínez Nadal, Santiago Iglesias, Leahy, (standing, left to right) Fernando Geigel, Alfonso Valdez, Bolivar Pagan, and Luis Obergh

Leahy oversaw the development of military bases and stations across the island. At the time of his appointment as governor, the only naval installations were a radio station and a hydrographic office. On 30 October 1939, a fixed-price contract was awarded for construction of the Naval Air Station Isla Grande. The scope was widened to include the Roosevelt Roads Naval Station; construction work there commenced in 1941 under another fixed-price contract and the base was commissioned on 15 July 1943.

Between 1 January and 1 November 1940, Leahy met with Roosevelt six times. One of the most important was a lunch on 6 October 1940. Admiral James O. Richardson, the CINCUS, had been ordered to keep the Pacific Fleet at Pearl Harbor to act as a deterrent to the Japanese. Richardson protested that Pearl Harbor was unsuitable as a base and was too vulnerable to a surprise attack. Leahy agreed, but knew better than to press the matter with Roosevelt when his mind was made up. On 1 February 1941, Richardson was recalled.

=== Ambassador to France ===
Henry L. Stimson and McGeorge Bundy described the Fall of France in June 1940 as "the most shocking single event of the war". American security had been underwritten by Britain and France, allowing the United States to have comparatively low defense spending. Planning was based on the assumption that France would be a bulwark against Germany, as it had been in World War I, and the United States would have ample time to mobilize industry and create armies. Now, with France gone, Germany could directly threaten the United States. On 18 November 1940, Leahy was appointed United States Ambassador to France. In his message asking Leahy to accept the position, Roosevelt explained:

We are confronting [the message said] an increasingly serious situation in France because of the possibility that one element in the present French Government may persuade Marshal Petain to enter into agreements with Germany which will facilitate the efforts of the Axis powers against Great Britain. There is even the possibility that France may actually engage in the war against Great Britain and in particular that the French fleet maybe utilized under the control of Germany.

We need in France at this time an Ambassador who can gain the confidence of Marshal Petain who at the present moment is the one powerful element in the French Government who is standing firm against selling out to Germany. I feel that you are the best man available for this mission. You can talk to Marshal Petain in language which he would understand and the position which you have held in our own Navy would undoubtedly give you great influence with the higher officers of the French Navy who are now hostile to Great Britain.

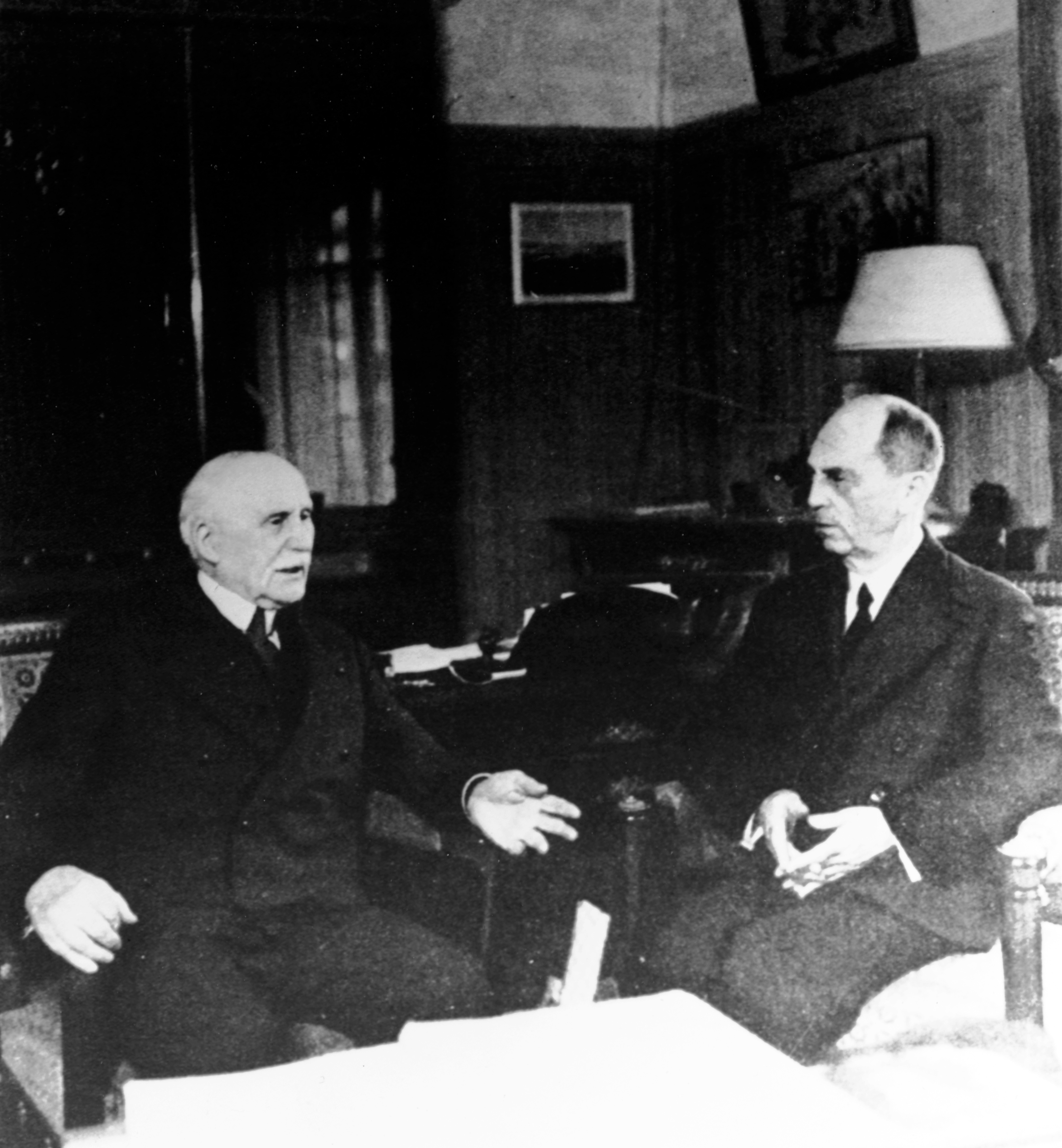
Leahy pays a farewell call on French Chief of State Marshal Philippe Pétain on 27 April 1942.

"My major task", Leahy later recalled "was to keep the French on our side in so far as possible". He hoped to convince Pétain and the Commander-in-Chief of the French Navy, Admiral François Darlan, that it was in France's best interest that Germany be defeated. He departed Norfolk, Virginia, on the cruiser USS Tuscaloosa on 17 December 1940, and presented his letter of credence to Pétain in Vichy on 9 January 1941.

Leahy had some levers with which to influence the French to moderate collaboration with the Axis Powers. He advised Roosevelt that shipments of food and medical aid to France would improve America's standing and stiffen Pétain's resolve. In his opinion, the "British blockade action which prevents the delivery of necessary foodstuffs to the inhabitants of unoccupied France is of the same order of stupidity as many other British policies in the present war." He suggested that aid to French North Africa would also strengthen the hand of General Maxime Weygand, the French Delegate-General in North Africa, in resisting Axis demands. Roosevelt compelled the British to accept the shipment of food and medicine for children, along with thousands of tons of fuel intended for their distribution.

American aid proved insufficient to buy French support. In May 1941, Darlan agreed to the Paris Protocols, which granted Germany access to French military bases in Syria, Tunisia, and French West Africa, and in July the French granted Japan access to bases in French Indochina, which directly threatened the American position in the Philippines. Although no German bombers had the range to bomb the United States from bases in Senegal, if they could deploy to Vichy-held Martinique, they could do so from there.

Weygand, the main American hope for a change in French policy, was recalled on 18 November 1941, despite Leahy's warnings that this could prompt a cessation of American aid. On 7 December, Leahy received news of the Japanese attack on Pearl Harbor. This was followed, on 11 December, by the German declaration of war against the United States. Leahy thought the United States's entry into the war would strengthen his hand with the Vichy government, but Charles de Gaulle's capture of Saint Pierre and Miquelon later that month discredited American assurances that French colonies would not be seized.

By this time Leahy was convinced that the United States should back Free France instead of Vichy France, and he unsuccessfully urged Roosevelt to use the capture of Saint Pierre and Miquelon as a pretext for recalling him to the United States. After the formation of a new government in Vichy under the pro-Axis Pierre Laval on 18 April, Leahy again requested he be recalled in order to distance the United States from Laval, and Washington officials agreed. Meanwhile, on 9 April, Leahy's wife Louise underwent a hysterectomy. While recovering from the operation, she suffered an embolism and died on 21 April. Leahy called on Pétain to say farewell on 27 April. He arrived back in New York on the Swedish-registered ocean liner SS Drottningholm on 1 June. He arranged for a funeral service for Louise at the St. Thomas Episcopal Church, where they had been members for many years, and watched her burial in Arlington National Cemetery on 3 June 1942. Reflecting on her loss, Leahy would write that Louise's death had "left me not only crushed with sorrow, but permanently less than half efficient for any work the future may have in store for me and completely uninterested in the remaining future."

== Chief of Staff to the Commander in Chief ==
=== Organization and role ===
Waging a two-ocean war as part of a coalition revealed serious deficiencies in the organization of the American high command when it came to formulating grand strategy: meetings of the senior officers of the Army and Navy with each other and with the President were irregular and infrequent, and there was no joint planning staff or secretariat to record decisions taken. Under the Constitution of the United States, the President was the Commander in Chief of the Army and Navy. At a meeting with Roosevelt on 24 February 1942, the Chief of Staff of the United States Army, General George C. Marshall, urged Roosevelt to appoint a chief of staff of the armed forces to provide unity of command, and he suggested Leahy for the role. Leahy had lunch with Roosevelt on 7 July, during which this was discussed. On 21 July, Leahy was recalled to active duty. He resigned as Ambassador to France and was appointed Chief of Staff to the Commander in Chief of the Army and Navy. In announcing the appointment, Roosevelt described Leahy's role as an advisory one rather than that of a supreme commander.

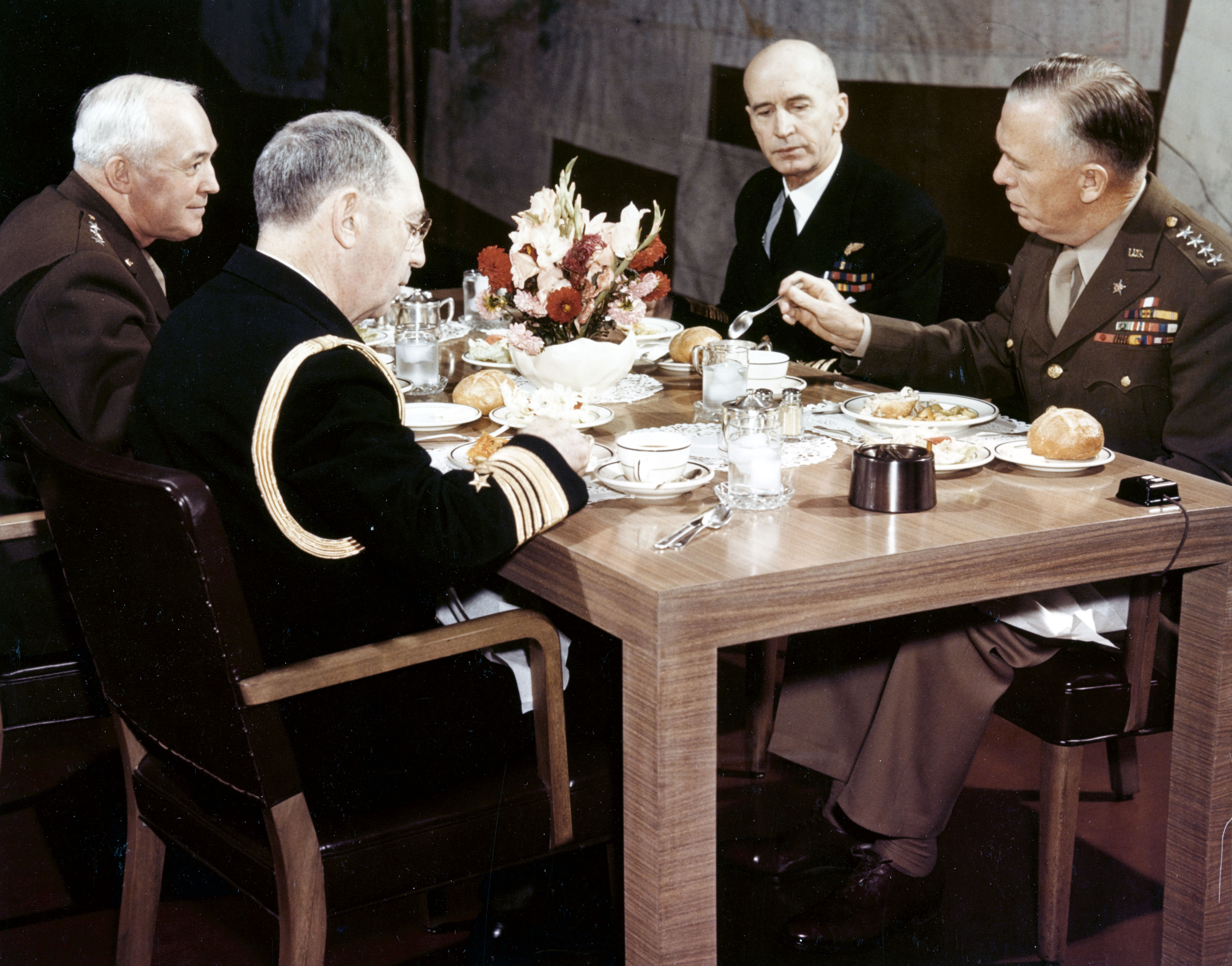
Joint Chiefs of Staff lunches were held every Wednesday. Left to right: General Henry H. Arnold, Chief of U.S. Army Air Forces; Leahy; Admiral Ernest J. King, Chief of Naval Operations and Commander in Chief, U.S. Fleet; and General George C. Marshall, Chief of Staff of the U.S. Army

Leahy attended his first meeting of the Joint Chiefs of Staff (JCS) on 28 July 1942. The other members were Marshall; King, who was now both CNO and Commander in Chief, U.S. Fleet (now abbreviated as COMINCH); and Lieutenant General Henry H. Arnold, the Chief of U.S. Army Air Forces. Henceforth, the JCS held regular meetings at noon on Wednesdays, which usually commenced with a light lunch. Leahy served as the de facto chairman. He drew up the agenda for the JCS meetings, presided over them, and signed off on all the major papers and decisions. He considered that this was due to his seniority and not by virtue of his position. He had a small personal staff of two military aides-de-camp and two or three secretaries. JCS meetings were held in the Public Health Service Building, where Leahy had an office. After some renovations were made, he was also given an office in the East Wing of the White House on 7 September 1942; the other two main offices there were occupied by Harry Hopkins and James F. Byrnes. Roosevelt had the Map Room constructed in the White House where large maps showed the progress of the war. Only Leahy and Hopkins had unrestricted access to the Map Room; everyone else had to be accompanied by Leahy or Hopkins or given special permission to enter.

Two days after his first JCS meeting, there was a meeting of the Combined Chiefs of Staff (CCS), which Leahy also chaired. In these meetings the JCS met with the leaders of the British Joint Staff Mission: Field Marshal Sir John Dill, Admiral Sir Andrew Cunningham, Air Marshal Douglas Evill and Lieutenant General Gordon Macready. CCS meetings were held every Friday. The main agendum item at his first JCS and CCS meetings was Operation Gymnast, a proposed invasion of French North Africa. Marshall and King were opposed to it on the grounds that it would divert resources necessary for Operation Roundup, a landing in northern France, but after listening to their arguments, Leahy informed them Roosevelt was adamant that it was vital American forces take the field against Germany in 1942, and that Gymnast was to proceed. Roosevelt gave his formal assent on 25 July. Marshall and King considered this to be tentative, but Leahy informed them that the decision was final.

Leahy usually arrived at his White House office sometime between 08:30 and 08:45 and went over copies of dispatches and reports. For convenience, the documents were color coded: pink for incoming dispatches from the theater; yellow for outgoing ones; green for JCS papers; white for CCS ones; and blue for papers from the Joint Staff Planners. Leahy would select the papers to be brought to the President's attention, and would meet with him each morning in the Oval Office or the Map Room. This included high-grade Ultra intelligence. Control of the flow of information gave Leahy a further source of power and influence beyond his personal relationship with the President.

=== Grand strategy ===
When Roosevelt travelled overseas, Leahy went with him. Leahy missed the Casablanca Conference in January 1943; after setting out with Roosevelt, Hopkins and Rear Admiral Ross McIntire, Leahy developed bronchitis and had to remain in Trinidad. But he was present at all the other inter-Allied conferences that the President attended. Leahy's support of Roosevelt's decision to invade French North Africa did not mean that he bought into the British Mediterranean strategy. He joined Marshall and King in their advocacy of a cross-Channel operation in 1944. At the first conference he attended, the Third Washington Conference, in May 1943 he clashed with the British chiefs of staff over their reluctance to undertake operations to reopen the overland route to China, which Leahy considered vital to both the war against Japan and the postwar era. Leahy eventually extracted a promise from the British to undertake Operation Anakim, an offensive to recapture Burma, in 1943. Leahy sided with Hopkins and Major General Claire Chennault in supporting a bombing offensive against Japan from bases in China despite Marshall's prescient warnings that this could not be sustained without adequate ground troops to protect the air bases. Marshall was proven correct when a Japanese offensive overran Chennault's bases.

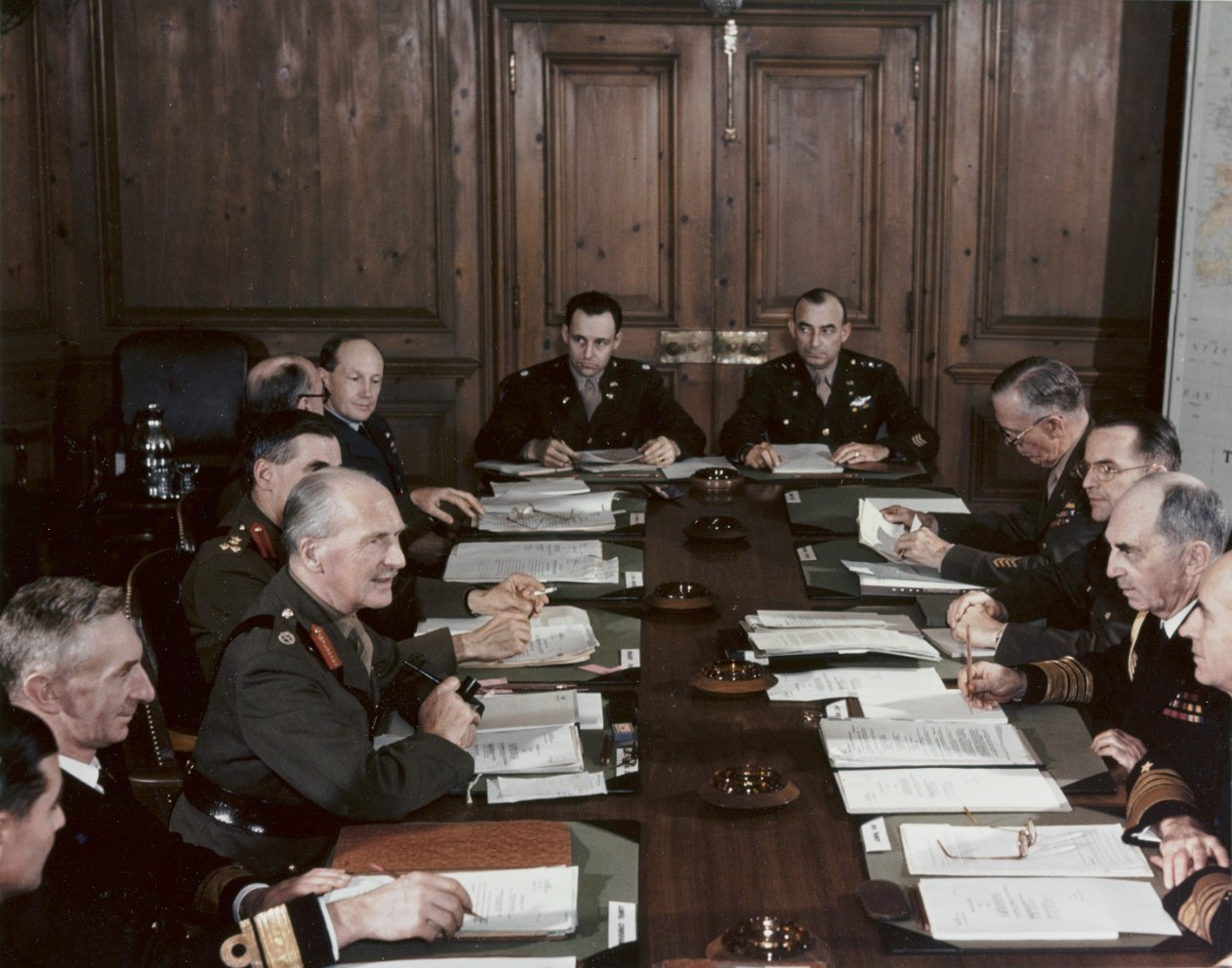
The Combined Chiefs of Staff meet in the U.S. Public Health Service Building in Washington, D.C., in October 1943; British officers, on the left side of the table, are (front to back): Wilfrid Patterson, John Dill, Vivian Dykes, Gordon Macready and Douglas Evill; U.S. officers, at the right side and head of the table, are (front to back): Ernest J. King, Leahy, John R. Deane, George C. Marshall, Joseph T. McNarney and an unidentified colonel.

On 12 November 1943, Roosevelt, Hopkins, Leahy, King and Marshall set off together from Hampton Roads on the battleship USS Iowa. Roosevelt occupied the captain's cabin, and Leahy the one for an embarked admiral. They reached Mers-el-Kebir on 20 November, from whence they flew to Tunis and then Cairo. Roosevelt stayed at the American Ambassador's compound in Cairo. Space was limited, so he took only Leahy and Hopkins with him. Discussions with the British were mainly concerned with Burma and China, about which they had much less interest than the Americans.

They then flew on to Tehran, Iran, for talks with Stalin. Roosevelt was slated to stay at the American legation there, but Stalin offered to put him up at the Soviet compound. He was allowed to bring two people with him, so he chose Leahy and Hopkins. The conference reached agreement with the Soviets on the cross-Channel operation (Operation Overlord) and an invasion of Southern France (Operation Anvil). When General Sir Alan Brooke began to back away from the commitment, Leahy lost his patience and demanded to know under what circumstances Brooke would be willing to undertake Overlord. The British, as Leahy put it, "fell into line".

Although the conservative Leahy regarded Hopkins as a "pinko", the two men worked well together, and Leahy became quite fond of Hopkins. Both were completely devoted to the President, and Leahy saw something of himself in the idealistic Hopkins. Over time, Leahy emerged as one of Roosevelt's most trusted advisors thereby becoming, in the words of historian Phillips O'Brien, "the second most powerful man in the world". The main reason for this was Hopkins' precarious health, as he had stomach cancer. Hopkins married Louise Gill Macy in the Yellow Oval Room on 30 July 1942, they moved out of the White House in December 1943. He was therefore no longer at Roosevelt's beck and call.

Leahy spent D-Day, 6 June 1944, in his home town of Hampton, Iowa. This well-publicized "sentimental journey" was part of the deception efforts surrounding the Allied invasion of Europe. The idea was to lull any German agents in the United States into believing that the operation would not take place while such an important officer was out of the capital. The following month, he accompanied Roosevelt to the Pacific Strategy Conference in Hawaii at which they met with Admiral Chester W. Nimitz, the commander in chief of the Pacific Ocean Areas, and General Douglas MacArthur, the commander in chief of the Southwest Pacific Area.

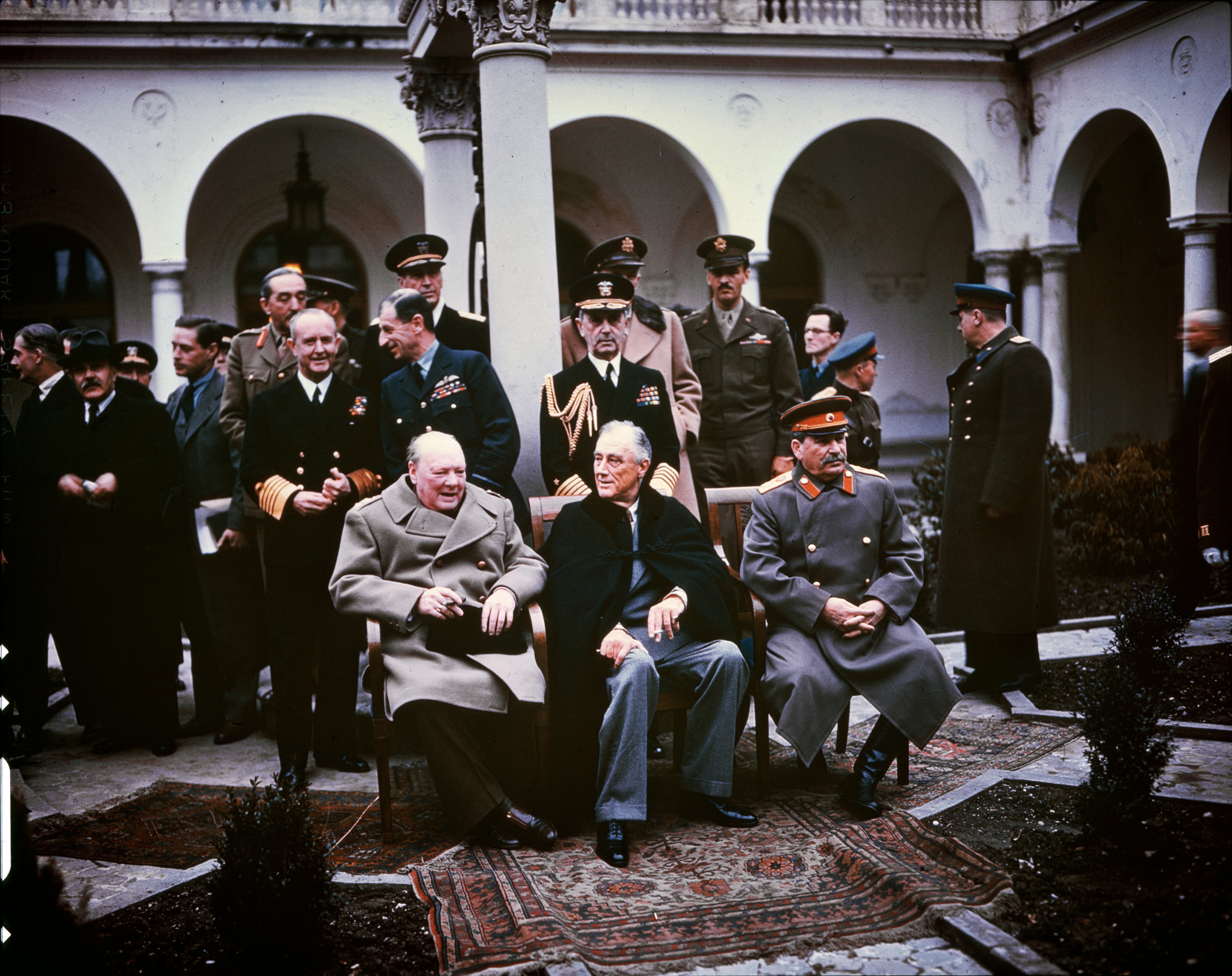
Winston Churchill, Franklin D. Roosevelt and Joseph Stalin meet at the Yalta conference in February 1945. Behind them are (left to right): Anthony Eden, Vyacheslav Molotov, unidentified, Alan Brooke, Andrew Cunningham, Charles Portal, Ernest King, Leahy, George Marshall, Laurence Kuter, Aleksei Antonov and Nikolay Kuznetsov.

Roosevelt, Leahy and presidential speech writer Samuel Rosenman (instead of Hopkins) set out from Washington in Roosevelt's personal railcar, the Ferdinand Magellan, on 13 July. They went to Hyde Park, where Roosevelt showed Leahy around his Presidential Library, then to Chicago, where Roosevelt conferred with leaders of the Democratic Party over the choice of Harry S. Truman as his vice presidential running mate in the 1944 election. In San Diego they boarded the cruiser USS Baltimore, which took them to Hawaii, where Nimitz briefed them on a proposed invasion of the island of Formosa, King's preferred target, but also spoke favorably of MacArthur's alternative of liberating the Philippines. Leahy hoped that this would facilitate a naval and air blockade that would make an invasion of Japan unnecessary. No decision was taken at this time, and the JCS continued debating the issue for months before authorizing the liberation of Luzon on 3 October.

Hopkins was not present at the Second Quebec Conference in September 1944 either, continuing Leahy's transformation into a White House advisor. Leahy did not attend the political sessions at Quebec, but at this level political and military issues were indistinguishable. For example, the JCS examined a proposal for a British fleet to participate in the Pacific War, a military proposal with a political objective. King was unenthusiastic about the idea; the U.S. Navy was performing well against the Japanese, and the addition of British forces would complicate command and logistics arrangements. Leahy and Marshall pressed for the British offer to be accepted, and in the end it was, with the proviso that the British Pacific Fleet would be self-supporting.

Another debate concerned the American occupation zone in Germany. The United States was allocated the southern part of Germany, which meant that its lines of communications would run through France, where Leahy was concerned about the prospect of a postwar Communist takeover. Roosevelt and Churchill reached a compromise, whereby the ports of Bremen and Bremerhaven would be given to the Americans, along with the right of transit through the British Zone.

Leahy was advanced to the newly created rank of Fleet Admiral on 15 December 1944, making him the most senior of the seven men who received five-star rank that month. He accompanied President Roosevelt to the Yalta Conference in February 1945. The cruiser USS Quincy took them to Malta, where Leahy chaired a CCS meeting to discuss the war against Germany, and then the President's personal aircraft, the Sacred Cow, flew them to Yalta. At Yalta, Roosevelt met Churchill and Stalin to decide how Europe was to be reorganized after the impending surrender of Germany.

On 12 April 1945, Roosevelt died. Leahy attended the ceremonies and the memorial service for his friend, which was held in the East Room of the White House.

=== Atomic bomb ===
On 13 April 1945, Leahy gave the regular morning briefing on the progress of the war to Truman, who had become president on Roosevelt's death. This was followed by a short meeting with the Joint Chiefs, the Secretary of War, Henry Stimson, and the Secretary of the Navy, James Forrestal. Afterwards, Leahy offered to resign, but Truman decided to retain him as chief of staff. On 18 June, the Joint Chiefs, along with Stimson and Forrestal, met with Truman at the White House to discuss Operation Olympic, the planned invasion of Kyushu. Truman chaired the meeting. Marshall and King strongly favored the operation, and all the others voiced their support except Leahy, who feared that it would result in high casualties. He questioned Marshall's casualty estimates, which were based on the Luzon campaign, which took place on a large land mass where there was ample room for maneuver, rather than the Okinawa campaign, which took place on an island where lack of maneuver room resulted in frontal assaults and high casualties.

According to Truman's Memoirs: Year of Decisions, Leahy was skeptical about the atomic bomb, saying: "That is the biggest fool thing we have ever done. The bomb will never go off, and I speak as an expert in explosives." After the bomb was tested and did explode, Truman consulted with Byrnes, Stimson, Leahy, Marshall, Arnold and Dwight D. Eisenhower, the commander of United States Forces, European Theater. The consensus was that the atomic bomb should be used. Although Leahy later wrote in his memoirs that his "own feeling was that in being the first to use it, we had adopted an ethical standard common to the barbarians of the Dark Ages", historian Barton J. Bernstein noted that Leahy did not oppose its use at the time:

Nor is there solid evidence that any high-ranking American military leader, other than General George C. Marshall on one occasion, expressed moral objections before Hiroshima to the use of the atomic bomb on Japanese cities. Nor, before Hiroshima, did any other top military leader – Admiral William Leahy, Admiral Ernest King, or General Henry Arnold – ever raise a political or military objection to the use of the A-bomb on Japanese cities or argue explicitly that it would be unnecessary. Only after the war would Leahy utter moral and political objections...

=== Truman administration ===
In July 1945, Leahy accompanied Truman to the Potsdam Conference where Truman met with Stalin and the new British Prime Minister Clement Attlee to make decisions about the governance of occupied Germany. Hopkins was too ill to make the journey. Leahy was disappointed in the outcome of these conferences. He considered that both Truman and Stalin had suffered defeats, with proposals that would have ensured a lasting peace in Europe being watered down or turned down. He recognized that the Soviet Union was a dominant power in Europe, and that the British Empire was in terminal decline, underscored by the mid-conference replacement of Churchill by Attlee.

Clement Attlee, Harry S. Truman and Joseph Stalin meet at the Potsdam Conference in July 1945; behind them are (left to right) Leahy, Ernest Bevin, James F. Byrnes and Vyacheslav Molotov.

On 24 January 1946, Leahy was appointed to the interim National Intelligence Authority (NIA), which oversaw activities of the nascent Central Intelligence Group. The following year the National Security Act of 1947 replaced these organizations with the National Security Council and the Central Intelligence Agency respectively, ending Leahy's involvement. He continued to chair meetings of the Joint Chiefs of Staff, and he rejected war plans that he felt placed too much emphasis on the first use of nuclear weapons.

Like many naval officers, he was opposed to the unification of the War and Navy departments into the Department of Defense, fearing that the Navy would lose its naval aviation and the Marine Corps. Nor did he agree with formalizing the role of Chairman of the Joint Chiefs of Staff, which he felt would place too much power in the hands of one individual. The position was created by amendments to the National Security Act that Truman signed into law on 10 August 1949, but the Chairman of the Joint Chiefs was not the single chief of staff the Army and Air Force wanted.

Leahy was involved in the preparation of two speeches that marked the onset of the Cold War: Truman's Navy Day address on 27 October 1945, and Churchill's "Iron Curtain" speech on 5 March 1946. The former was written by Leahy and Rosenman, and reflected Leahy's ideas about the fundamental goals of U.S. foreign policy; the latter was written by Churchill, but in consultation with Leahy, who was the only one of the "American military men" referred to in the speech with whom Churchill discussed the speech. But Leahy's non-interventionist stance on U.S. involvement in the Greek Civil War and the Israeli–Palestinian conflict were increasingly out of step with the policies of the Truman administration. On 20 September 1948, columnist Constantine Brown published allegations that White House advisors Clark Clifford and David K. Niles were urging Truman to get rid of Leahy, whom they regarded, Brown said, as an "old-fashioned reactionary".

On the day after Truman won the presidential election on 2 November 1948, Leahy asked to be retired in January. In December, doctors diagnosed Leahy with a partial blockage of the kidneys. On 28 December, he met with Truman as chief of staff for the last time. Truman officially accepted his resignation as his chief of staff on 2 March 1949, although as an officer with five-star rank, Leahy technically remained on active service as an advisor to the Secretary of the Navy.

The following year, Leahy published his war memoirs, I Was There. His unemotional, unexciting and unenlightening style did his publisher no favors. Orville Prescott the book reviewer for The New York Times wrote: "As the personal confidant of President Roosevelt and President Truman, Admiral Leahy ought to have a good story to tell. Unfortunately, he hasn't... its stiff official manner, its elaborate discretion, its desperate need of editing and its lack of any exciting new information make it dull and dusty fare... writes in a prose style as rigid as a naval cadet standing at attention in his review." The book sold poorly, and when Leahy subsequently proposed a book about his time in Puerto Rico, the publisher turned it down.

== Death and legacy ==
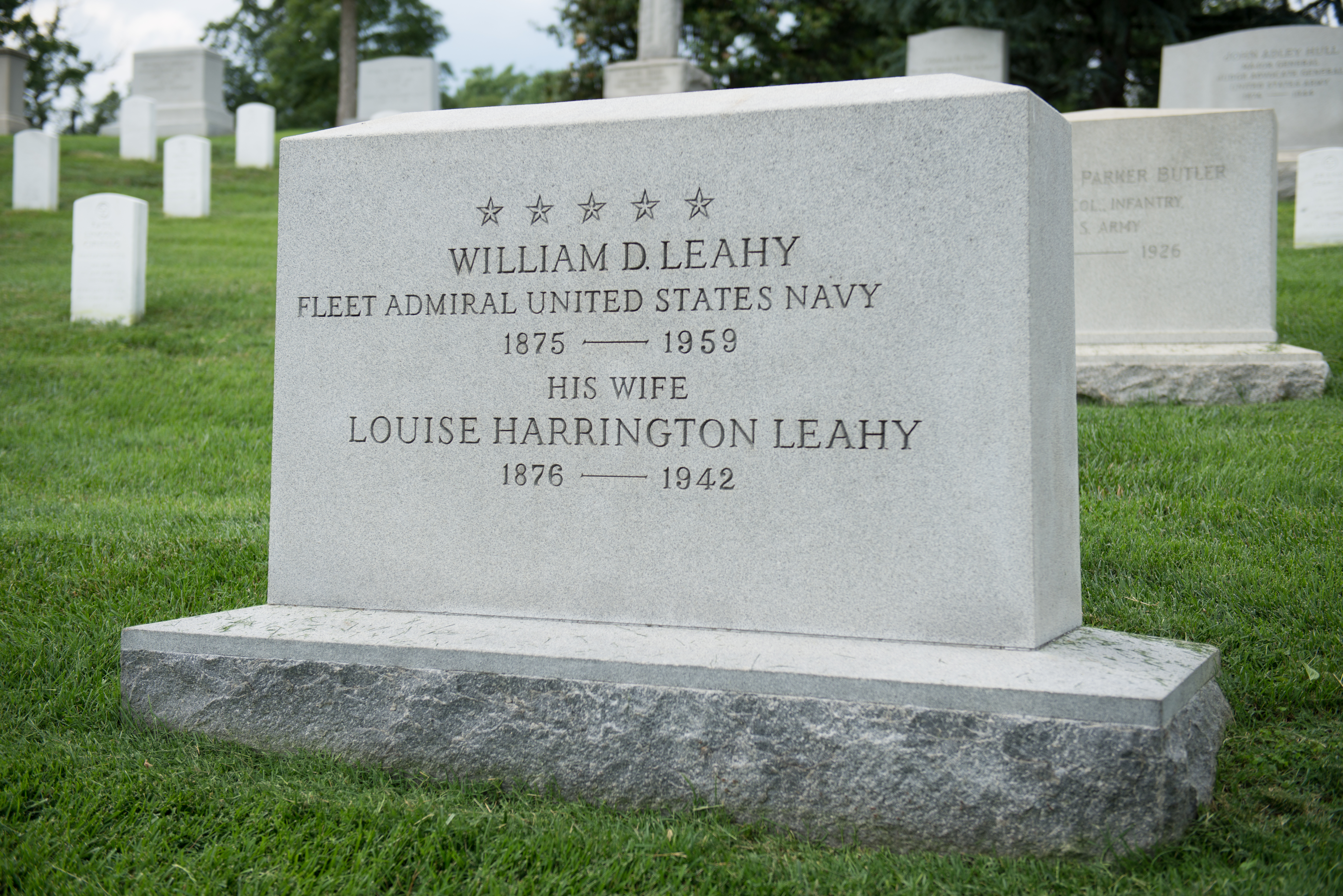
Leahy's grave at Arlington National Cemetery

Leahy died at the U.S. Naval Hospital in Bethesda, Maryland, on 20 July 1959, at the age of 84. At the time of his death, he was the oldest officer on active duty in the history of the U.S. Navy. He was given an Armed Forces military funeral. His body was viewed at the Bethlehem Chapel at the Washington National Cathedral from noon on 22 July until noon the following day. A funeral service was then held in the cathedral at 14:00, followed by the burial in Arlington National Cemetery. Honorary pallbearers were Fleet Admiral Chester W. Nimitz, Admiral Thomas C. Hart, Admiral Charles P. Snyder, Admiral Louis E. Denfeld, Admiral Arthur W. Radford, Vice Admiral Edward L. Cochrane, and Rear Admiral Henry Williams, all retired from service. Active military servicemen who were honorary pallbearers were Admiral Jerauld Wright, Admiral Robert L. Dennison, Rear Admiral Joseph H. Wellings, and close friend, William D. Hassett.

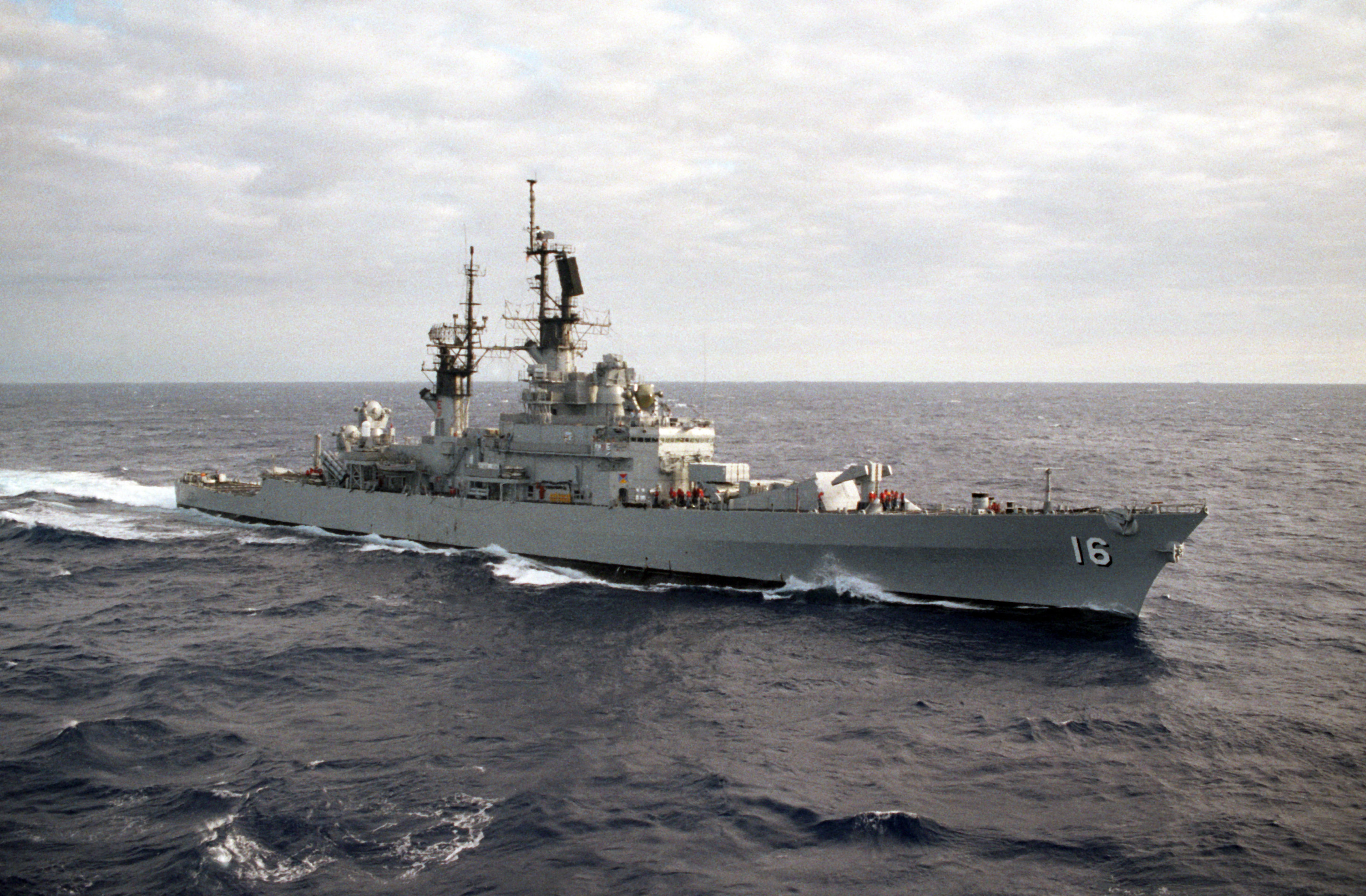
USS Leahy underway in the Pacific Ocean in June 1986

Leahy's papers are in the Naval History and Heritage Command and the Library of Congress in Washington, D.C.; some personal correspondence is held by the Wisconsin Historical Society. USS Leahy (CG-16), the lead ship of the Leahy-class cruisers, was named in his honor. In 2014, Quarters BB at the Old Naval Observatory was renamed Leahy House. The order from Leahy to King and Marshall that ended hostilities in World War II was used to decorate the house's mantelpiece.

== Dates of rank ==
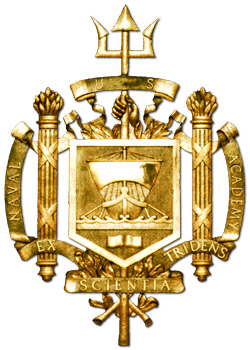
United States Naval Academy naval cadet – Class of 1897, 35th of class of 47

Ensign	Lieutenant Junior Grade	Lieutenant	Lieutenant Commander	Commander
O-1	O-2	O-3	O-4	O-5
1 July 1899	1 July 1902	31 December 1903	15 September 1909	29 August 1916

Captain	Rear Admiral	Vice Admiral	Admiral	Fleet Admiral
O-6	O-8	O-9	O-10	Special Grade
1 July 1918	14 October 1927	13 July 1935	2 January 1937	15 December 1944

== Decorations and awards ==

Navy Cross
Navy Distinguished Service Medal with two gold stars	Sampson Medal	Spanish Campaign Medal
Philippine Campaign Medal	Nicaraguan Campaign Medal (1912)	Mexican Service Medal
Dominican Campaign Medal	World War I Victory Medal with "TRANSPORT" clasp	American Campaign Medal
Asiatic–Pacific Campaign Medal	European–African–Middle Eastern Campaign Medal	World War II Victory Medal
Navy Occupation Service Medal	National Defense Service Medal	Navy Rifle Marksmanship Ribbon

- Leahy was invested as an Honorary Knight Grand Cross of the Military Division of the Most Honorable Order of the Bath on 21 November 1945.

== Bibliography ==
- Leahy, William D. (1950). I Was There: The Personal Story of the Chief of Staff to Presidents Roosevelt and Truman: Based on His Notes and Diaries Made at the Time. New York: Whittlesey House. OCLC 702607509.

== Notes ==
Military offices
Preceded by William H. Standley	Chief of Naval Operations; 1937–1939	Succeeded by Harold R. Stark
New office	Chief of Staff to the Commander in Chief; 1942–1949	Succeeded by Omar Bradley as Chairman of the Joint Chiefs of Staff
Political offices
Preceded by José E. Colón	Governor of Puerto Rico; 11 September 1939 – 28 November 1940	Succeeded by José Miguel Gallardo
Diplomatic posts
Preceded by William C. Bullitt	United States Ambassador to France; 1941–1942	Vacant German occupation of France Title next held by Jefferson Caffery in 1944
