= Joseph Wallace Oman =

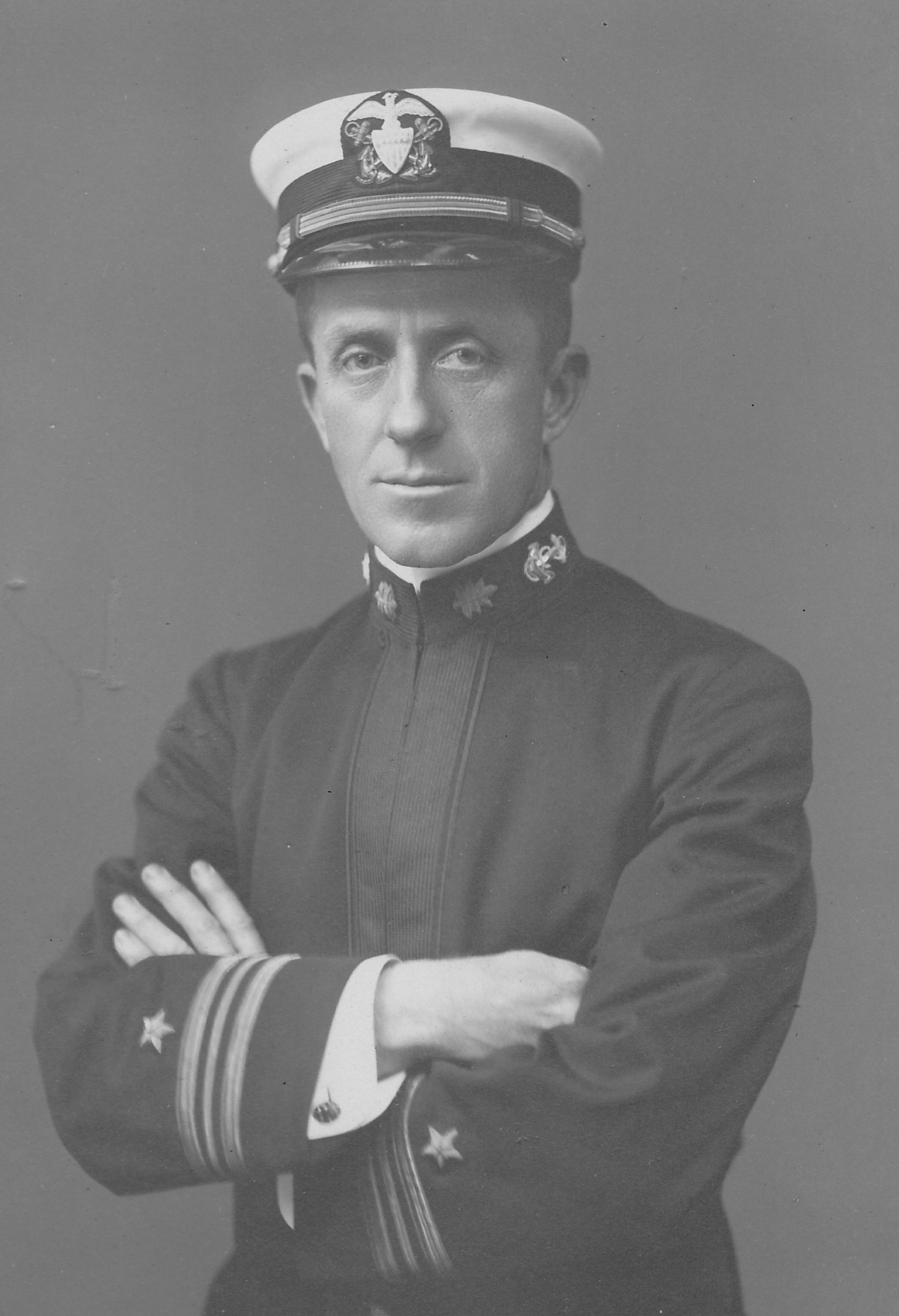
- J. Wallace Oman USN LCDR 1905
- Born: August 15, 1864; Lightstreet, Pennsylvania, U.S.
- Died: July 1, 1941 (aged 76); London, England
- Burial place: Mount Auburn Cemetery, Cambridge, Massachusetts
- Relatives: Charles Malden Oman (brother)
- Military career
- Allegiance: United States
- Branch: United States Navy
- Service years: 1886–1921
- Rank: Rear Admiral
- Nickname: Wallace
- Commands: USS Mariveles; USS Tacoma; USS Des Moines; USS Maine; USS North Carolina; USS Georgia; USS Cleveland; USS Manning; USS Leviathan; Supervisor, Harbor of New York
- Conflicts: Spanish–American War; Philippine–American War; World War I
- Awards: Navy Cross

Joseph Wallace Oman (1864–1941) was a rear admiral in the United States Navy and veteran of the Spanish–American War, the Philippine–American War, and World War I. He is a recipient of the Navy Cross. He was also the Governor of the United States Virgin Islands from 1919 to 1921.

== Biography ==
Oman was born in Lightstreet, Pennsylvania, 15 August 1864, the son of Henry Freas Oman and Mary Jane Shannon. He was brother to Charles Malden Oman.

In 1908 he married at St. Agnes Chapel in New York City, Virginia Center Morse, daughter of William Henry Morse and Sarah Virginia Center, and granddaughter of Alexander Jenkins Center, Vice President of the Panama Railway. Joseph Wallace and Virginia had four children: Virginia (died in infancy); Joseph Wallace Jr, William Morse Oman, and Virginia Morse Oman. He died 1 July 1941 in London, England. He and his wife are buried in Mount Auburn Cemetery, Cambridge, MA.

He entered the United States Naval Academy in 1882, having been appointed a naval cadet by congressman Robert Klotz, and graduated 4th in his class of 1886. He was commissioned as an ensign in 1888 and promoted to Lieutenant, Junior Grade in 1896. During the Philippine–American War, he commanded the gunboat Mariveles. He was promoted to Lt. Commander in 1905, and circumnavigated in the 1907-09 Great White Fleet as navigator and executive officer of the battleship USS Rhode Island. In 1909, he was promoted to commander. He was captain of the Boston Navy Yard in 1913. In 1916-1917 he served as Supervisor, Harbor of New York.

In July 1917, Captain Oman was given command of the former German ship, the SS Vaterland, now claimed by the United States. The Vaterland was in 1914 the largest passenger ship in the world, and by the war it was still one of the largest. Two months later, the ship was re-christened as the USS Leviathan and was used as a troop transport. During the war, USS Leviathan successfully avoided submarine patrols, despite the vessel's huge size, and managed to deliver nearly 120,000 American troops before the end of the war. Oman was awarded the Navy Cross and promoted to rear admiral in 1918. In 1918 he served as Commander of the Atlantic Fleet Cruiser Force and Commandant of the Second Naval District in Newport RI. During the 1918-20 flu pandemic, he created "Camp Admiral Oman" on the Vanderbilt Farm outside Newport to safely quarantine a thousand sailors in open air tents.

"The Governor's Own"

From 1919 until his retirement from the navy in 1921, Oman served as the military governor of the United States Virgin Islands. He is credited as having one of the most efficiently running of the early colonial governments and the island prospered, largely thanks to exports of rum. Alton Adams, the first black bandmaster of the U.S. Navy, wrote that his march, The Governor's Own (1921), had been inspired by Oman.

Oman was... liked by all who met him [and] had recently done me a singular service by persuading the Navy Department to waive my sea duty requirement and grant me permanent appointment as bandmaster. I left Government House with a wonderful feeling of gratitude, and as I walked down the hill, fragments of a march came to my mind and persisted. The ideas remained with me all afternoon, taking on shape and melody. Oman was a short, jaunty, snappy sort of fellow, and that provided me with my motif. So out of a combination of gratitude, respect, and sympathy, I went home and that night wrote him a march... it became through custom the march of all the islands' governors... It won considerable praise in the United States from bandsmen like Herbert Clarke and John Philip Sousa, and for several years it was used as the official march for commencement exercises at Howard University.

Following his retirement, Oman eventually moved to London, where he died in 1941.

Oman's brother Charles Malden Oman also served in the US Navy, also being a Rear Admiral at the time of Oman's death, and serving as commander of the Naval Medical Center in Washington, D.C.

== Bibliography ==
- ADMIRAL J. W. OMAN. Special to THE NEW YORK TIMES. New York Times. New York, N.Y.: Jul 3, 1941. pg. 19, 1 pgs

Preceded by James Harrison Oliver	Governor of the U.S. Virgin Islands; 1919–1921	Succeeded by Sumner Ely Wetmore Kittelle
