= Mariveles (disambiguation) =

Mariveles is a municipality in Bataan, the Philippines.

Mariveles may also refer to:

- Mount Mariveles, a mountain in Bataan, Philippines
- Mariveles Naval Section Base, a US Navy base in Bataan
- Mariveles Reef, a reef in the Spratly Islands, currently occupied and administered by Malaysia
- USS Mariveles, a US Navy gunboat
- Mariveles, a barangay in Dauis, Bohol, Philippines
