= USS Fullam =

US Navy Fletcher-class destroyer in service 1943-1947

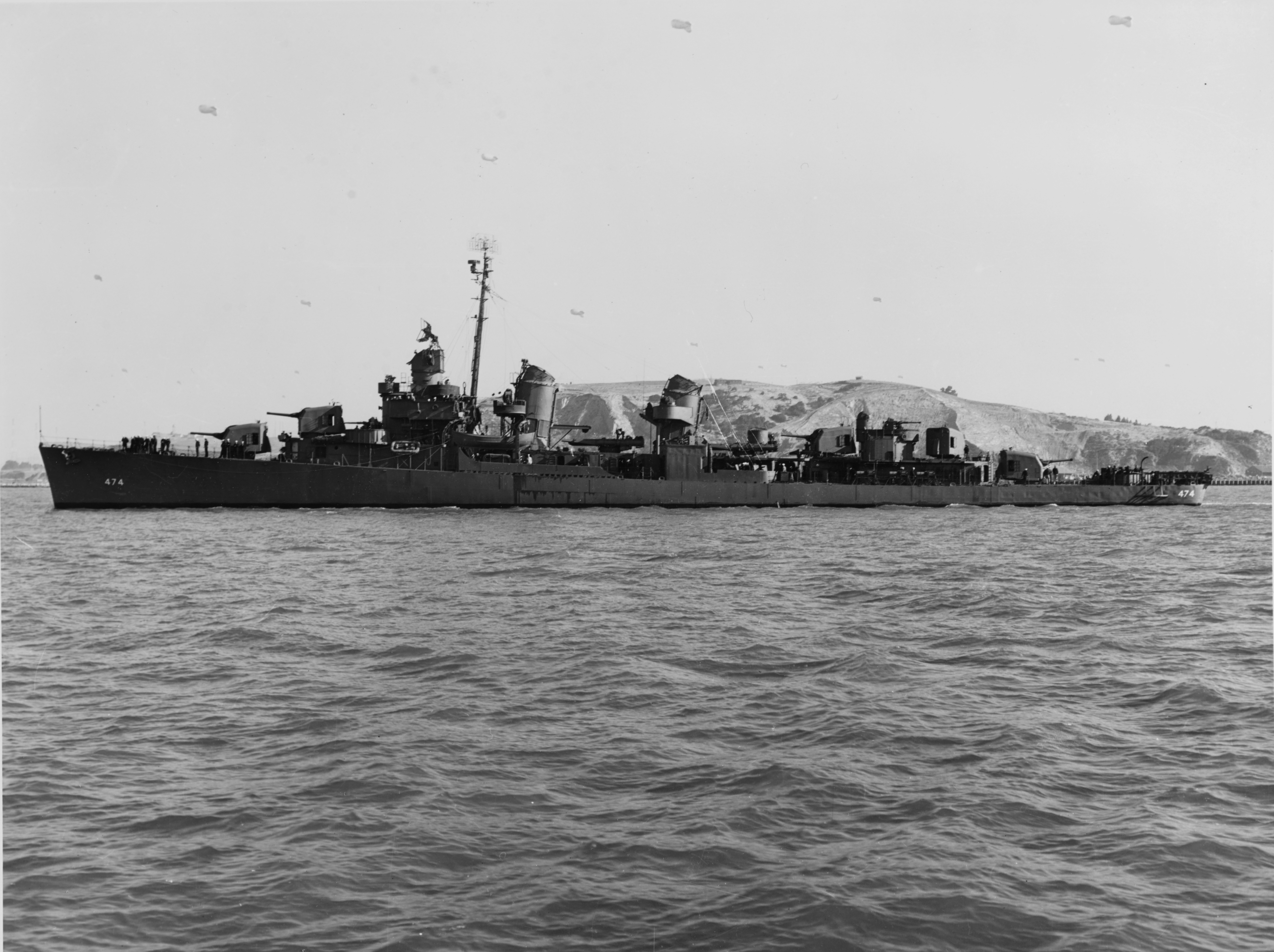

History

United States
- Namesake: William Fullam
- Builder: Boston Navy Yard
- Laid down: 10 December 1941
- Launched: 16 April 1942
- Commissioned: 2 March 1943
- Decommissioned: 15 January 1947
- Stricken: 1 June 1962
- Fate: Sunk as target, 7 July 1962

General characteristics
- Class & type: Fletcher-class destroyer
- Displacement: 2,050 tons
- Length: 376 ft 6 in (114.7 m)
- Beam: 39 ft 8 in (12.1 m)
- Draft: 17 ft 9 in (5.4 m)
- Propulsion: 60,000 shp (45 MW); 2 propellers
- Speed: 35 knots (65 km/h; 40 mph)
- Range: 6500 nmi. (12,000 km) at 15 kt
- Complement: 336
- Armament: 5 × single Mk 12 5 in (127 mm)/38 guns; 5 × twin 40 mm (1.6 in) Bofors AA guns; 7 × single 20 mm (0.8 in) Oerlikon AA guns; 2 × quintuple 21 in (533 mm) torpedo tubes; 6 × single depth charge throwers; 2 × depth charge racks

USS Fullam (DD-474) was a Fletcher-class destroyer in the United States Navy during World War II. Fullam was named for Rear Admiral William Fullam (1855–1926).

Fullam was launched 16 April 1942 by Boston Navy Yard; sponsored by Miss Mariana F. Welch, granddaughter of Rear Admiral William Fullam; and commissioned 2 March 1943.

== History ==
Fullam served briefly as an east coast escort, then arrived at San Diego, California, 28 June 1943. After training in the Hawaiian Islands, she arrived at Efate, New Hebrides, 28 August for escort and patrol duties in the Solomons. From 1 November, when she covered the landings on Cape Torokina, Fullam guarded convoys carrying reinforcements and supplies to Bougainville as well as bombarding enemy installations in the Empress Augusta Bay area 25 January 1944. Four days later, at Vella Lavella, transports Fullam screened, embarked a mixed reconnaissance party of New Zealanders and American sailors, which was landed on the Green Islands, 30 January. The party was reembarked that night, and the landings in force by New Zealand troops on the Green Islands took place 15 February, as Fullam and her task force provided protective cover.

Through the next 3 months, Fullam continued her patrol, escort, and bombardment missions in the Solomons, joining in the landings on Emirau 20 March 1944. After training and replenishment at Port Purvis on Florida Island in the Solomons, and at Espiritu Santo, the destroyer joined the 5th Fleet for the assault on the Marianas. She arrived off Tinian 12 June for the bombardments on Tinian and Saipan which began the next day and continued until the landings of 15th. Ordered west to search for an enemy task force known to be moving into position to oppose the landings, Fullam rejoined the carrier task force 19 June as the Battle of the Philippine Sea opened. During this 2-day engagement, she joined in the general firing which combined with fighter actions brought down the vast majority of the Japanese naval aviation as an effective element in the war. Completing her assignment in the Marianas with duty screening the cruisers bombarding Guam as well as firing on targets there herself, Fullam departed the Marianas 10 August for Eniwetok.

After training at Guadalcanal, Fullam sortied from Port Purvis 6 September 1944 for the assault on the Palau Islands. Six days out, she and Noa (APD-24) collided, Noa sinking in 6 hours, and Fullam being badly damaged. Despite this, Fullam not only rescued all of Noa's men, but also carried out daily shore bombardment and night harassing fire, as well as covering the work of underwater demolition teams, as Peleliu was assaulted, then sailed for temporary repairs at Manus and a west coast overhaul.

Fullam returned to Pearl Harbor for training 24 December 1944, then sailed for picket duty off Pagan Island before reaching Saipan 15 February 1945. Here she joined a task group for the Iwo Jima assault, sailing 16 February to serve as screen and fire-support ship during the assault and the bitter fighting which followed until 28 February. After replenishing at Leyte, she sailed 27 March in the screen of an escort carrier group for the Okinawa operation. After providing air cover to the landings of 1 April, her group began continual strikes on the airfields on the Sakashima Clunto from which suicide flights were launched by the Japanese. On 4 May, while screening Sangamon (CVE-26) with another destroyer, Fullam fired on a group of four kamikazes attacking the carrier. The screening destroyers shot down three of the attackers, but the fourth crashed the escort carrier's flight deck, forcing many of her men over the side. Three were saved by the destroyers, who stood by as Sangamon extinguished the huge fire.

From 13 May 1945, Fullam was assigned to antisubmarine patrol and antiaircraft fire support off Hagushi Beach, as well as antiaircraft fire support ship for fighter-director ships on radar picket stations away from the island. She sailed from Okinawa 1 July to escort landing craft to Guam, and an escort carrier from Guam to Eniwetok. Assigned to operate with carriers against northern Japan, Fullam cleared Eniwetok 11 August for Adak, but arriving after the close of hostilities, instead took up escort and patrol duties in the Aleutians until entering Puget Sound Naval Shipyard 13 November.

In March 1946 she sailed south to San Diego, where she was placed out of commission in reserve 15 January 1947.

== Honors ==
Fullam received seven battle stars for World War II service.
