= Charles Malden Oman =

American military surgeon

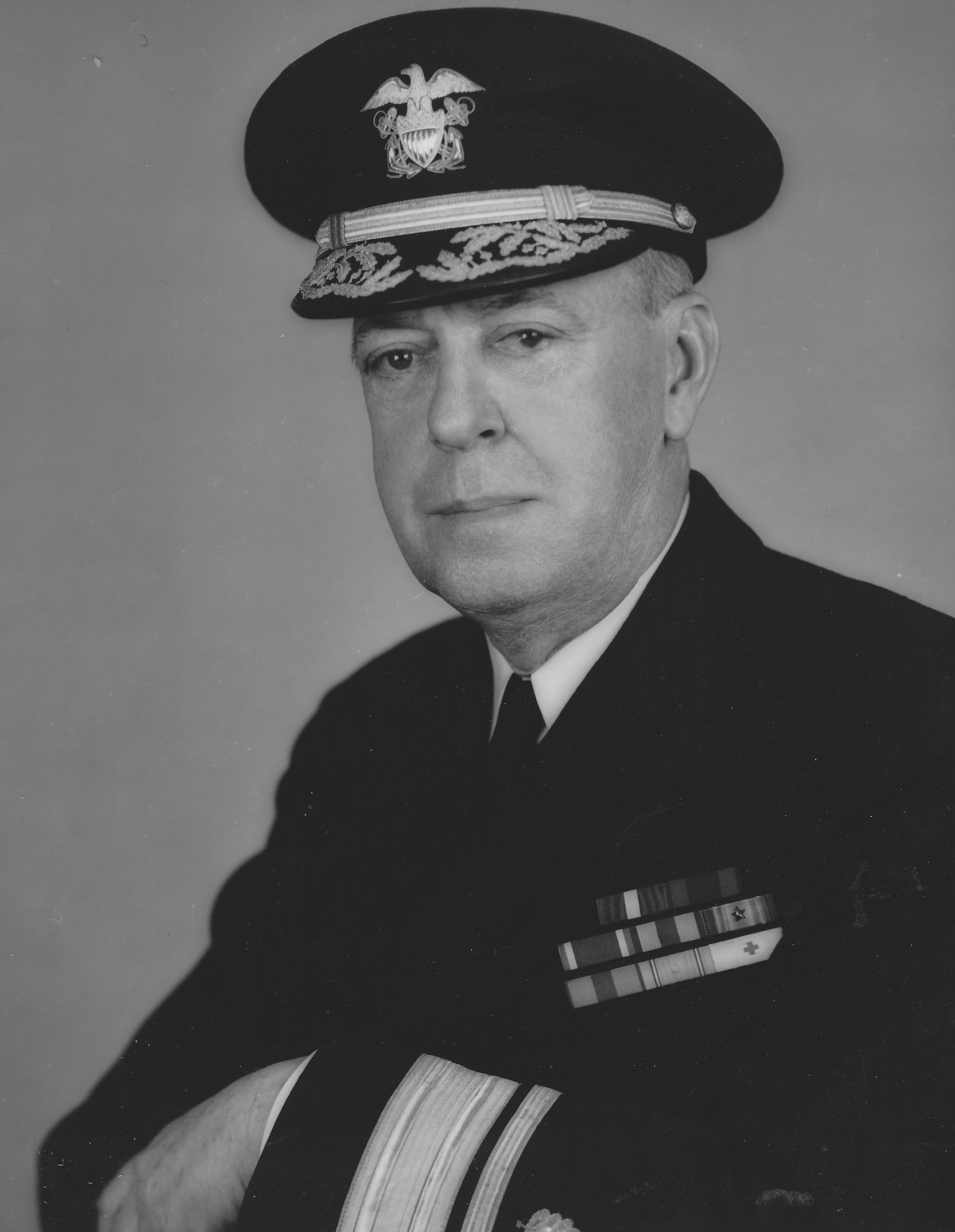
- Nickname: Charles
- Born: October 23, 1878; Lightstreet, Pennsylvania
- Died: November 1, 1948 (aged 70) Beacon, New York
- United States Navy/Medical Corps: United States Navy
- Service years: 1901–1945
- Rank: Rear Admiral
- Commands: USS Comfort (AH-3) US Naval Base Hospital Brest, France 1917–1919; Naval Medical School, Washington DC 1920-1921; Naval Hospital, Washington DC 1921–1924; Naval Dispensary, Washington DC 1928–1931; Naval Hospital, Annapolis, Washington DC 1931–1935; Naval Hospital, Brooklyn NY 1936–1937 National Naval Medical Center, Bethesda, MD 1941–1943 Naval Convalescent Hospital, Harriman NY 1943–1945
- Awards: Navy Cross
- Education: University of Pennsylvania Medical School

Charles Malden Oman (1878–1948) was a rear admiral and surgeon in the United States Navy Medical Corps, serving during the Spanish-American War, the Philippine-American War, and both World Wars. During World War I, he commanded the Naval Base Hospital No.1 in Brest, France, and received the Navy Cross. He later led several naval hospitals and served four years in Peking, China. During World War II was the first commanding officer of the US Naval Medical Center in Bethesda, MD.

== Biography ==
Oman was born in Lightstreet, Pennsylvania, 23 October, 1878, the son of Henry Freas Oman and Mary Jane Shannon. After graduating from University of Pennsylvania Medical School in 1901, he was commissioned Lieutenant Junior Grade and Assistant Surgeon in the United States Navy Medical Corps. He was immediately assigned as medical officer on USS Monadnock and USS Frolic serving during the successive Philippine Insurrection and Cuban pacification campaigns, learning to treat war injuries and tropical diseases among sailors and islanders.

In 1909, he circumnavigated on the Great White Fleet aboard USS Illinois. On the final leg he treated numerous civilians injured in the catastrophic 1908 Messina earthquake. During World War I Oman commanded the hospital ship USS Comfort and later the Naval Base Hospital No.1 at Brest France, and subsequently was awarded the Navy Cross. In 1916, he married Heloise Graham Brinckerhoff. After 1920–1924 duty at the Naval Medical School and Hospital in Washington, they moved to China where he served Medical Officer of the Peking American Legation 1924–1927. There Oman operated on hundreds of Chinese casualties of the 1925 Anti-Fengtian civil war. He advanced through grades, became Rear Admiral in 1936, and commanded several large US Navy hospitals.

In 1938, Congress authorized construction of a new naval hospital, medical and dental school and research institute in Bethesda, Maryland – the National Naval Medical Center (NNMC). Oman commissioned it in 1942 and became its first commanding officer 1941–1942. The NNMC - a tri-service facility since 2005 - is now known as the Walter Reed National Military Medical Center. Oman served on the National Board of Medical Examiners 1921-1948. He frequently contributed to medical journals and authored a textbook on wartime surgery, and for lay readers, a history of the US Naval Medical Corps. He later commanded Naval Convalescent Hospital at Harrison NY until fully retiring in 1945. Oman died November 1, 1948, in Beacon, NY.

His older brother Joseph Wallace Oman also became a US Navy rear admiral, won the Navy Cross for World War 1 service, and served as military governor of the United States Virgin Islands 1919–1921.
