= USS Tacoma =

USS Tacoma may refer to the following ships of the United States Navy:

- USS Tacoma (1893) (sometimes spelled as Takoma), a harbor tugboat built 1893 as Sebago; purchased by U.S. Navy during the Spanish–American War renamed Tacoma in 1898; reverted to original name, 1900; sold for scrapping, 1937
- USS Tacoma (CL-20) (originally Cruiser No. 18), a Denver-class protected cruiser launched in 1903 and struck in 1924
- USS Tacoma (PF-3), lead ship of Tacoma-class of patrol frigates; launched, 1943; transferred to the Republic of Korea as Taedong (PF-63), 1951; struck in 1973 and currently a museum ship
- USS Tacoma (PG-92), an Asheville-class gunboat launched in 1968 and struck in 1995
