= William Fullam =

William Freeland Fullam
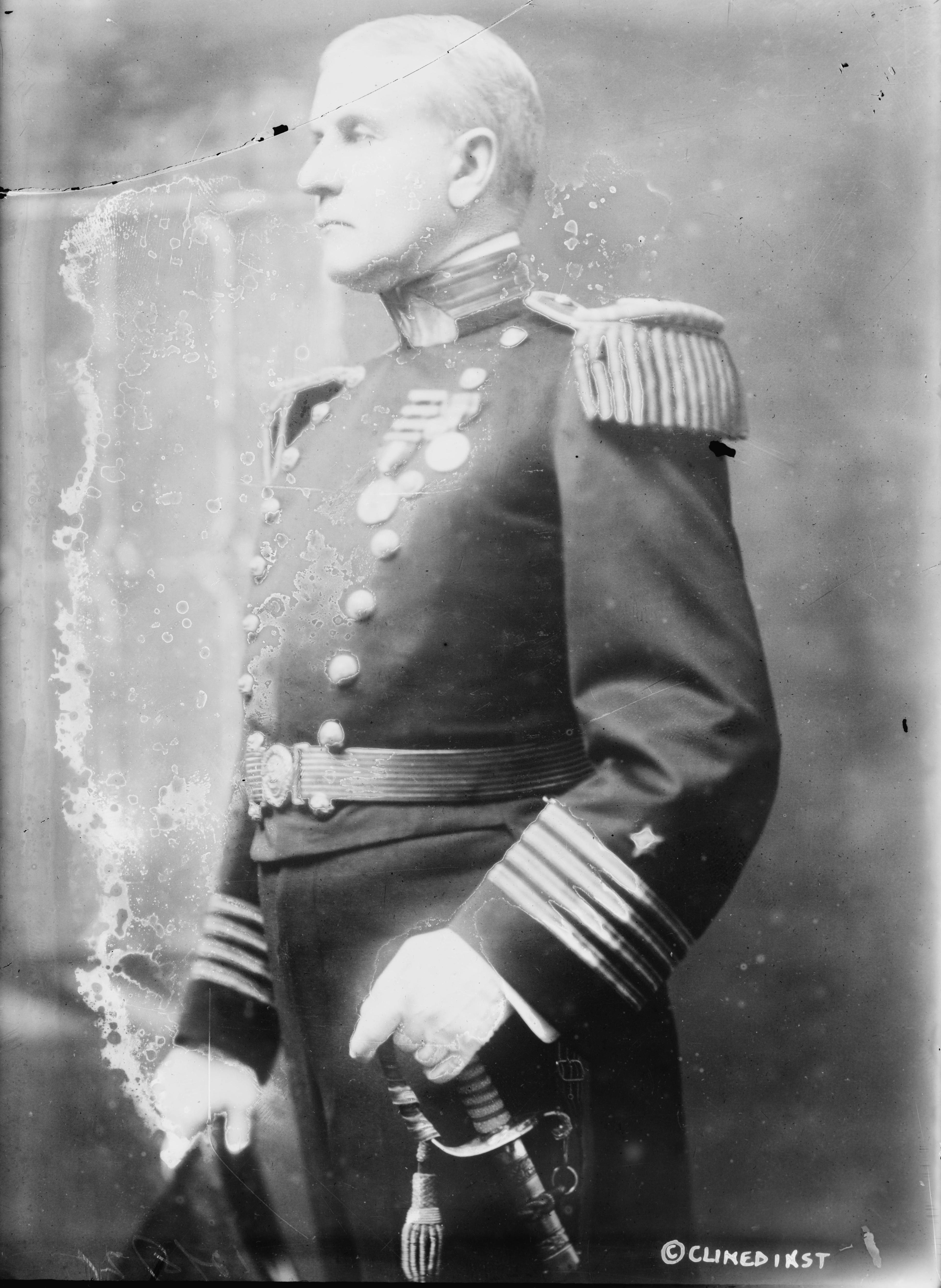
- Born: October 20, 1855; Pittsford, New York, U.S.
- Died: September 23, 1926 (aged 70); Washington, D.C., U.S.
- Burial place: United States Naval Academy Cemetery
- Military career
- Allegiance: United States of America
- Branch: United States Navy
- Service years: 1877–1919
- Rank: Rear Admiral
- Commands: USS Chesapeake; USS Mississippi
- Conflicts: Spanish–American War, World War I
- Awards: Navy Cross

William Freeland Fullam (October 20, 1855 – September 23, 1926) was an officer in the United States Navy during World War I.

== Biography ==
Born in Pittsford, New York, William Freeland Fullam was admitted into the United States Naval Academy, 24 September 1873; graduating No. 1, June 1877- Class of 1877. His commands through his long and distinguished naval career ranged from the sailing ship USS Chesapeake in 1904 to the battleship USS Mississippi in 1909. On 15 April 1888, Lieutenant (j.g.) William Fullam married Ms. Mariana Winder Robinson; they had two daughters.

During the Spanish–American War, Navy Lieutenant Fullam served aboard USS New Orleans (CL-22) during the Santiago Campaign- the blockading and bombardment of Santiago and San Juan; earning the Spanish Campaign Medal. Chief among his assignments ashore was as acting aide to Secretary of the Navy Josephus Daniels, February 1913 – late January 1914, followed by duties as Superintendent of the United States Naval Academy, which he commanded from 7 February 1914 until spring of 1915. Following this successful assignment at the USNA, Rear Admiral Fullam was ordered to report for sea duty at the San Francisco naval district to become Commander-in-Chief, U.S. Pacific Fleet Reserve Force; effective 5 June 1915. He hoisted his flag aboard USS South Dakota (ACR-9), and later aboard USS Milwaukee (C-21). As Commander-in-Chief he was highly critical of the little interest the West coast citizens held in preparing for involvement of the European war. He stated: "It was time they awoke to the necessity for adequate preparedness...In the event of war the United States Navy would need at once 175,000 trained men."

In April 1917, Rear Admiral Fullam became Commander-in-Chief Patrol Force, U.S. Pacific Fleet, and was senior officer in command of the Pacific Fleet during the absence of the Fleet's Commander-in-Chief in South Atlantic waters. The merit of his service in such responsible positions was recognized with the award of the Navy Cross. In early 1918 Vice Admiral Kantarō Suzuki (who later became the 42nd Prime Minister of Japan from April 7, 1945, to August 17, 1945) brought his two cruisers Asama and Iwate to San Francisco and "banqueted" with Rear Admiral Fullam after receiving harbor entrance by Rear Admiral Fullam. Continuing his duties as Commander-in-Chief, U.S. Pacific Fleet, throughout the World War until 1 August 1919, he coordinated with the Japanese and British forces all ship movements while patrolling the whole Pacific from Alaska to the Panama Canal Zone. This was in order to check all German activities.

During the summer of 1919, Rear Admiral Fullam, Commander, U.S. Pacific Fleet, was instrumental in arranging with the Navy Department for half of the U.S. Atlantic Fleet battleships to be assigned to the Pacific coast; bringing a total of fifteen battleships to protect our Pacific interests and communication sea lanes. Overall, during his tenure as Commander-in-Chief, Reserve Force, U.S. Pacific Fleet (1915–1919), Rear Admiral Fullam had a constant struggle with the Navy Department regarding Pacific force policy and shortages in personnel manning the ships. His communicating in personal letters to many of his fellow senior officers were forceful and were written with a freedom of expression- all wishing to prepare their units for the coming World War.

Rear Admiral Fullam retired (due to age) on Monday, October 20, 1919. At the time of his retirement, he was regarded by young and old alike as an ideal naval officer. Rear Admiral Fullam was a member of the New York Yacht Club, the Army and Navy Club, Navy League of the United States, and the United States Naval Academy alumni. Rear Admiral Fullam died at Washington, D.C., aged 70.

== Legacy ==
The destroyer USS Fullam (DD-474) was named for him.

Rear Admiral Fullam closely followed the progress and reports coming out of the Washington Naval Conference. He praised the Conference for modernizing naval thought (setting it free from the "thralldom of conservatism"), and having decreed the scrapping of 66 battleships and a holiday of ten years in battleship building. He strongly supported bringing the battleship into a lesser fleet role, allowing for increased procurement and utilization of submarines, aeroplane carriers and aeroplanes as offensive weapons- what he referred to as our "Three-Plane-Navy". Thus, a "balanced fleet" was more critical to the overall naval strength. He coined the term "battleshipitis".

At the 14th Annual Banquet of the Aero Club of America, Rear Admiral Fullam stated: "The world is facing a new era, an era which will bring aeronautics to the front and give it a proper place in peace and war...The aeroplane will be the dominating factor in future wars on land and sea...It is the duty of every naval officer to study and develop the usefulness of the aeroplane as a weapon. In this we must lead the world, we must not follow."

To the Marine Corps, then Lieutenant (j.g.) William Fullam was well known to be an enemy to the Corps's institution and organization, due to his announcement that he would see that the Marine Corps is to be destroyed. It was the professional opinion of a number of young naval officers led by Lieutenant Commander Seaton Schroeder who cordially approved and endorsed the views of Lieutenant Fullam that the day for shipboard duties for Marines had passed. The term Fullamite became a name that has long became registered in many military books denoted someone that refers to non-believers of the Marine Corps philosophy.

== Awards ==
During his distinguished career, Rear Admiral William F. Fullam, USN, received the following awards:

- Recognition for graduating No. 1, USNA Class of 1877
- Spanish Campaign Medal, 1898
- Special Letters of Commendation for work protecting American interests in the West Indies (Cuba) and Central America (Honduras), 1906
- Three Letters of Commendation for efficiency aboard USS Mississippi, 1909–1911
- World War I Victory Medal (United States), 1917–1919
- Navy Cross

== Ancestry ==
- Member of "The Empire State Society of the Sons of the American Revolution"
- Lineage listed in "Colonial Families of the United States of America, Volume VI"

William F. Fullam was a direct descendant of American Revolutionary War veteran Lieutenant Elisha Fullam II of Weston, Massachusetts. William was the son of Nathan Seymour Fullman and Rhoda Ann Stowits. Lieutenant Elisha Fullam II assisted in establishing American Independence while acting as a platoon officer within Captain Jonathan Davis' Company of Colonel Asa Whitcomb's 5th Militia of the Massachusetts Line, 23rd Continental Regiment of Foot. This unit marched on the alarm of 19 April 1775- the Battles of Lexington and Concord. Thus, on 20 October 1920 (at the age of 65 years) William F. Fullam, Rear Admiral, USN (Ret.), became a member of "The Empire State Society of the Sons of the American Revolution".

== See also ==
- List of superintendents of the United States Naval Academy

Academic offices
Preceded by John H. Gibbons	Superintendent of United States Naval Academy; 1914–1915	Succeeded by Edward Walter Eberle
