= USS Manning =

USS Manning may refer to the following ships:

- USRC Manning (1898), was commissioned 8 January 1898 and decommissioned 22 May 1930
- USS Manning (DE-199), was launched 1 June 1943 and decommissioned 15 January 1947
