= USS Mariveles =

Gunboat in the United States Navy during the Spanish–American War

History

United States
- Name: Mariveles
- Builder: Hong Kong and Whampoa Dock Company, Hong Kong
- Laid down: 1886
- Acquired: by purchase, 1898
- Commissioned: 17 June 1899
- Decommissioned: 8 August 1901
- Stricken: 8 June 1908
- Fate: Sold, 2 January 1909

General characteristics
- Type: Gunboat
- Displacement: 170 long tons (170 t)
- Length: 99 ft 9 in (30.40 m)
- Beam: 16 ft 6 in (5.03 m)
- Draft: 6 ft (1.8 m)
- Speed: 7 knots (13 km/h; 8.1 mph)
- Complement: 27 officers and enlisted
- Armament: 1 × 3-pounder (47 mm (1.85 in)) gun; 2 × 1-pounder (37 mm (1.46 in)) guns; 2 × machine guns

The first USS Mariveles was a gunboat in the United States Navy during the Spanish–American War.

A former Spanish unarmored gunboat, Mariveles was laid down in 1886 by Hong Kong and Whampoa Dock Company, Hong Kong; purchased by the War Department in 1898; transferred to the Navy on 2 May 1899; and commissioned 17 June 1899, Lt. (jg.) J. W. Oman in command.

== Service history ==
Departing Cavite shortly after commissioning, Mariveles steamed for the southern Philippines to patrol off the coasts of Leyte, Cebu, and Samar. Cooperating with the Army in suppressing the Filipino insurgents in the Philippine–American War, the gunboat served in this area for six months, and then saw duty as a convoy escort and artillery support vessel during the Kobbes Expedition against forces on Luzon in January 1900. In February, following patrol duty off the eastern coast of Luzon, the ship returned to Manila for overhaul at Cavite Navy Yard.

She decommissioned there in early March. Mariveles recommissioned briefly from 16 to 22 August to act as a ferryboat for the Army in Manila Bay, and then was placed in ordinary at Cavite.

The gunboat returned to active service on 1 May 1901, and sailed on 22 May, via Cebu, for Iloilo, Panay. She patrolled off the coast of that island and Samar cooperating with Army units ashore, protecting American lives, and suppressing piracy.

The gunboat was decommissioned on 8 August 1901 at Cavite and was held in reserve at the Navy Yard, serving intermittently as a ferry in Manila Bay, until stricken from the Navy list on 8 June 1908. She was sold to Faustino Lichauce on 2 January 1909.

== Bibliography ==
- Silverstone, Paul H. (2006). The New Navy, 1883 – 922. The U.S. Navy Warship Series. New York: Routledge. ISBN 0-415-97871-8.
