= Battelle =

Battelle may refer to:

== Places ==
- Battelle, Alabama, unincorporated community in Alabama
- Battelle Darby Creek Metro Park, metropolitan park located southwest of Columbus, Ohio
- Battelle Hall, multi-purpose arena and exhibit hall located in Columbus, Ohio

== Organizations ==
- Battelle for Kids, non-profit organization focusing on educational improvement, headquartered in Columbus, Ohio
- Battelle Memorial Institute, R&D organization that manages eight national laboratories, headquartered in Columbus, Ohio

== People ==
- Ann Battelle (born 1968), American skier
- Annie Maude Norton Battelle (1865–1925), American suffragette and philanthropist
- Ebenezer Battle also known as Ebenezer Battelle, American politician, and patriot who fought in the American Revolutionary War
- Ebenezer Battelle (1754–1815), American bookseller and patriot who fought in the American Revolutionary War
- Gordon Battelle (minister) (1814–1862), American Methodist minister, abolitionist, Union Army chaplain, and delegate to the West Virginia Constitutional Convention
- Gordon Battelle (1883–1923), American metallurgist and founder of the Battelle Memorial Institute
- John Battelle, (born 1965) American entrepreneur, author, and journalist
- Kenneth Battelle, birth name of Mr. Kenneth (1927–2013), American celebrity hairdresser
- Phyllis Battelle (1922-2005), American journalist
- Shane Battelle (born 1971), American soccer player
- Steven Battelle, lead singer, guitarist, writer, and co-founder of the British rock band LostAlone

== See also ==
- Battle (disambiguation)
