= List of ghost towns in Wyoming =

This is an incomplete List of ghost towns in Wyoming.

== Classification ==
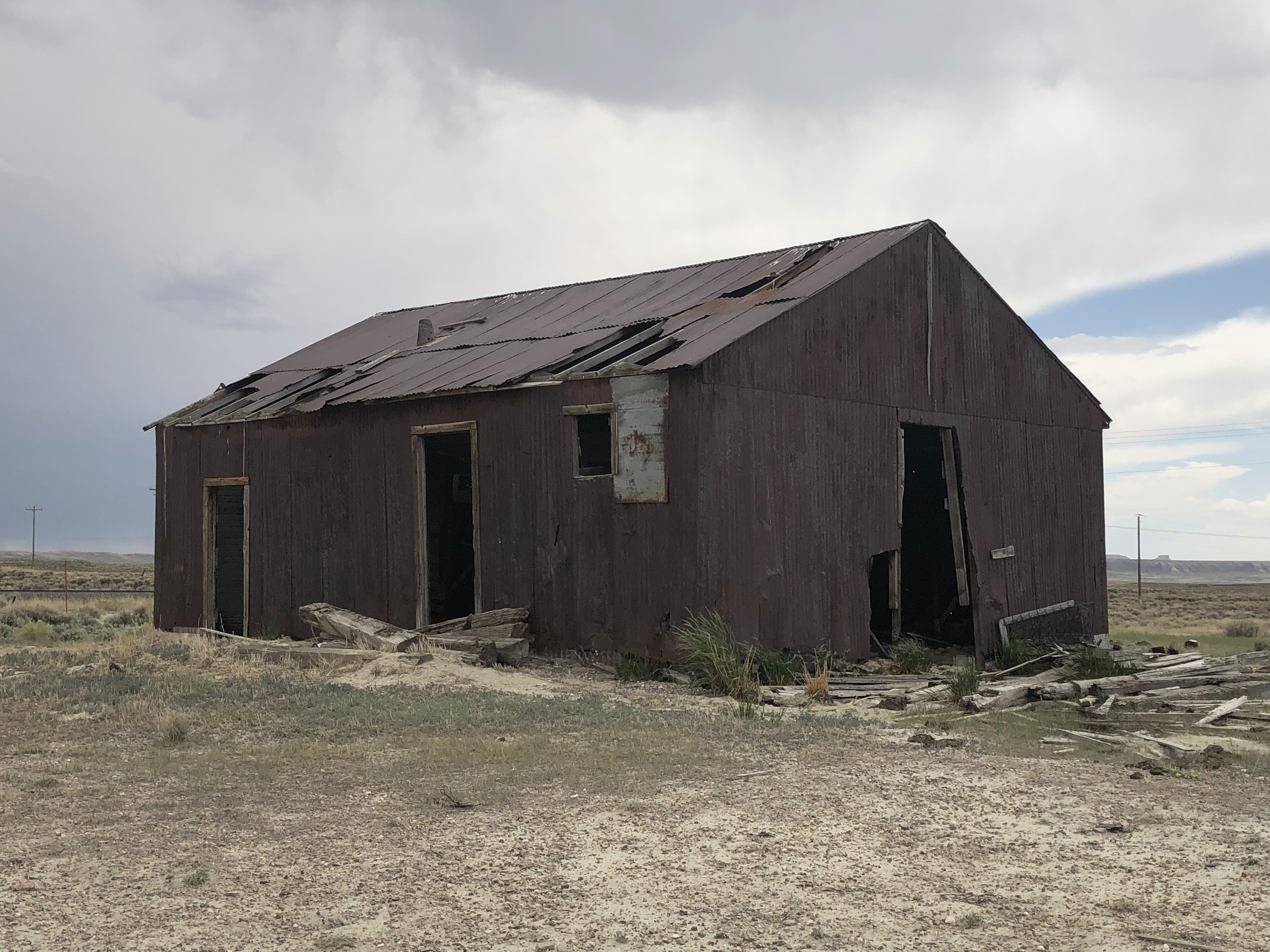
One of the buildings in Table Rock, which was bulldozed in 2011

=== Barren site ===
- Sites no longer in existence
- Sites that have been destroyed
- Covered with water
- Reverted to pasture
- May have a few difficult to find foundations/footings at most

=== Neglected site ===
- Only rubble left
- Roofless building ruins
- Buildings or houses still standing, but majority are roofless

=== Abandoned site ===
- Building or houses still standing
- Buildings and houses all abandoned
- No population, except caretaker
- Site no longer in existence except for one or two buildings, for example old church, grocery store

=== Semi abandoned site ===
- Building or houses still standing
- Buildings and houses largely abandoned
- few residents
- many abandoned buildings
- Small population

=== Historic community ===
- Building or houses still standing
- Still a busy community
- Smaller than its boom years
- Population has decreased dramatically, to one fifth or less.

== Table ==
Name	Other names	County	Location	Settled	Abandoned	Current status	Remarks
Alva		Crook County				Semi-abandoned	
Antelope Flats				1893	1912	Neglected	
Atlantic City		Fremont County		1868		Semi-abandoned	
Baker Town		Crook County	East of Aladdin				
Barrett Town		Crook County	West of Aladdin				
Battle		Carbon County		July 3, 1778			
Bear River City	Beartown	Uinta County	Approximately 10 miles southeast of Evanston, WY	1867			
Bear Rock				1906			
Benton				July to September 1868			
Bessemer				1888			
Bosler		Albany County		1900			
Bryan		Sweetwater County		September 1868			
Buckhorn				1900			
Buford		Albany County					
Cambria		Weston County		1889	1928		
Canyon Springs							
Carbon		Carbon County		1868		Abandoned	
Carter		Uinta County		December 27, 1867			
Clifton				1907			
Cumberland		Lincoln County		1900			
Eadsville				1891			
Empire		Goshen County		1908			
Forest City							
Fort Laramie		Goshen County		1834		Historic	
Fort Steele							
Gebo		Hot Springs County				Neglected	
Hecla		Laramie County					
Horton							
Jay Em		Goshen County					
Jeffrey City		Fremont County					
Jireh							A planned college town that never took off.
Kane		Big Horn County					
Kirwin		Park County				Historic	
Linwood		Daggett County	On the Wyoming-Utah state line				
Lewiston							
Lost Springs		Converse County					
Manhattan							
Mineral Hill		Crook County		1930s			
Miner's Delight		Fremont County		1867			
Moskee							
Pacific Springs							
Piedmont	Byrne	Uinta County				Abandoned	
Point of Rocks		Sweetwater County					
Rocky Ford							
Sage		Lincoln County					
South Pass City		Fremont County				Semi-abandoned	
Sherman		Albany County					
Spencer							
Sunrise		Platte County					
Table Rock		Sweetwater County		Late 1970s	2010	Barren	
Tubb Town		Weston County					
Upton		Weston County				Historic	
Van Tassell		Niobrara County					
Walcott		Carbon County					
Welcome		Crook County	Nearby to Mineral Hill Wyoming				
Whoop-Up							
