= Battle (disambiguation) =

A battle is a combat in warfare between two or more parties.

Battle, Battles, or The Battle(s) may also refer to:

== Military ==
- Battle (formation), a military formation or subdivision of troops
- Battle-class destroyer, a class of 26 destroyers of the Royal Navy and Royal Australian Navy
- Fairey Battle, a light bomber of the Royal Air Force built by Fairey Aviation in the late 1930s
- List of battles, a partial list of battles that have entries in Wikipedia

== Places ==
- Battle, East Sussex, England
- Battle, Powys, Wales
- Battle, Reading, England
- Battle, Wyoming, United States

== Music ==
- Battles (band), an experimental rock band featuring Ian Williams and John Stanier
- Battle (South Korean band), a Korean boy band
- Battle (UK band), an indie rock band from Surrey, England
- The Battle (George Jones album), a 1976 country music album by George Jones
- The Battle (Allen-Lande album), a power metal album by Symphony X vocalist Russell Allen and Masterplan vocalist Jørn Lande
- Battles (album), a 2016 album by metal band In Flames
- "Battle" (song), a 2000 song by Wookie
- "The Battle" (George Jones song), 1976
- "Battles" (La'Porsha Renae song)
- "Battles", a song by The Afters from their album Live On Forever
- "Battle", a song by Blur from their album 13
- "Battle", a song by Colbie Caillat from her album Coco
- "Battle", a song by Patrick Wolf from his album The Bachelor
- "The Battle", a song by Strawbs from their debut album Strawbs
- "Battle", an instrumental song by Wolfstone from their EP Burning Horizons
- "the battell", part of the 1591 collection of keyboard pieces My Ladye Nevells Booke by William Byrd

== Film, television and written fiction ==
- Battle (2018 film), directed by Katarina Launing
- "Battles" (Spaced), a 1999 television episode
- "The Battle" (Star Trek: The Next Generation), a Season 1 episode of Star Trek: The Next Generation
- The Battle (1911 film), directed by D.W. Griffith
- The Battle (1923 film), directed by Sessue Hayakawa and Édouard-Émile Violet
- The Battle (1934 film), also known as Thunder in the East
- The Battle (Rambaud novel), 1997 French novel La Bataille by Patrick Rambaud; winner of that year's Prix Goncourt
- The Battle (Kluge novel), 1964 German novel Schlachtbeschreibung
- The Battle, a 1908 play by Cleveland Moffett
- The Battle, a 1974 play by Heiner Müller
- The Battle (2026 play), a 2026 play by John Niven

== Other fields ==
- Battle (surname), a list of persons with the surname Battle or Battles
- Battle.net, an online gaming service
- The Battle (boxing), a WBA welterweight title bout between Miguel Cotto and Antonio Margarito
- Freestyle battle, a contest in which two or more rappers compete or battle each other using freestyle rap
- The Battle (Brack), a 1983 painting by John Brack
- "Battle" as war metaphors in cancer

== See also ==
- Battle Creek (disambiguation)
- Battle Lake (disambiguation)
- Battle River (disambiguation)
- Battle Royale (disambiguation)
- Justice Battle (disambiguation)
- Battlefield (disambiguation)
- Battel (disambiguation)
- Battell
- Battelle (disambiguation)
- Battler (disambiguation)
