= Battle Creek (disambiguation) =

Battle Creek is a city in the U.S. state of Michigan.

Battle Creek may also refer to:

== Cities ==
- Battle Creek, Iowa
- Battle Creek, Michigan
- Battle Creek, Nebraska
- Battle Creek, Utah, the original name of Pleasant Grove, Utah
- Battle Creek, Virginia

== Streams ==
- Battle Creek (Milk River tributary) in Canada and north-central United States

=== United States ===
- Battle Creek (California)
- Battle Creek (Maple River), a river in Ida County, Iowa
- Battle Creek (Minnesota)
- Battle Creek (Owyhee River), Idaho
- Battle Creek (Nebraska)
- Battle Creek (Evans Creek tributary), a stream in Oregon
- Battle Creek (Butte County, South Dakota)
- Battle Creek (Cheyenne River), a stream in South Dakota
- Battle Creek (Lake Campbell), a stream in South Dakota
- Battle Creek River in Michigan

=== Other places ===
- Battle Creek (Northern Territory), a tributary of the Victoria River in the Northern Territory of Australia

== Other ==
- Battle Creek (Amtrak station)
- Battle Creek (TV series), American television series on CBS
- Battle Creek Cypress Swamp, Maryland
- Battle Creek massacre
- Battle Creek Sanitarium, in Battle Creek, Michigan
- Battlecreek, a 2017 film directed by Alison Eastwood
- Battle Creek Brawl, alternate title for The Big Brawl, a 1980 film starring Jackie Chan

== See also ==
- Battle (disambiguation)
- Battle River (disambiguation)
- Battle Lake (disambiguation)
