= The Nightmare of Bembi =

2026 Indian Meitei language short film

The Nightmare of Bembi (Note: written in Meitei script as ꯗ ꯅꯥꯏꯠꯃꯦꯔ ꯑꯣꯐ ꯕꯦꯝꯕꯤ.) is a 2026 Indian Meitei language short film. It is directed by Tenzing Pukhrambam. It is recognized as a sensitive portrayal of the 2023 Manipur conflict’s impact on children and families, often showing the chaos’ long lasting aftermath. It is the winner of the Best Psychological Drama (War Theme) award at the Indian Panorama International Film Festival 2025–26 in Mumbai. It is also the winner of the Best Short Film at the Oceaniek Short Films Awards 2026 in Chandigarh. It won top honours, including Best Debut Director, Best Actress, Best Screenplay, and Best Music, at the Jakarta Independent Cine Awards 2026, organized in Guwahati.

It received Best Debut Short Film at the Kodaikanal International Film Festival and Special Jury Award for Best Debut Short Film at the Athvikvaruni International Film Festival in Tamil Nadu. It is also selected for screening at the Nagpur Film Festival 2026, organised by the Nagpur University.

It is 23 minutes in duration. It is a debut film project for the director.

== Cast ==
The film casts Pretty Laishram, Rantan Mayanglambam, Ragini, Valentina Sagapam, Amit Kshetrimayum, Zuleykq Naorem, and Priyalakhshmi Langpoklakpam.

== Response ==
Manipur Chief Minister Yumnam Khemchand Singh commented on the film, “It is a matter of pride that this film presents a narrative marked by depth, sensitivity, and memorable imagery.” He also commented on the film's success in achieving numerous awards in different international film festivals, "This achievement underscores the creative excellence and storytelling strength of Manipur's film fraternity".

== Awards and honours ==
Year	Award / Category	Film Festival / Organization	Venue	Status	Note(s)
2025–26	Best Psychological Drama (War Theme)	Indian Panorama International Film Festival	Mumbai	Won	
2026	Best Short Film	Oceaniek Short Films Awards	Chandigarh	Won	
2026	Best Debut Director	Jakarta Independent Cine Awards	Guwahati	Won	
2026	Best Actress	Jakarta Independent Cine Awards	Guwahati	Won	
2026	Best Screenplay	Jakarta Independent Cine Awards	Guwahati	Won	
2026	Best Music	Jakarta Independent Cine Awards	Guwahati	Won	
2026	Best Debut Short Film	Kodaikanal International Film Festival	Kodaikanal, Tamil Nadu	Won	
2026	Special Jury Award for Best Debut Short Film	Athvikvaruni International Film Festival	Tamil Nadu	Won	

== See also ==
- Battlefield (Manipuri film)
- Story of a Forest
- Toy Gun (Manipuri film)
