= Toy Gun (film) =

2025 Indian film

Toy Gun (Note: written in Meitei script as ꯇꯣꯏ ꯒꯟ.) is a 2025 Indian Meitei language short film. It is written and directed by Thingnam Parshuram in his directorial debut. It is produced by first-time producer Khumallambam Omeshwori under the banner of Freedom Ekon & Farm House Production. It stars National Film Award-winning actress Leishangthem Tonthoi, alongside child actor Thingnam Parihanba.

It shows the backdrop of a conflict-affected region of Manipur during the traditional Meitei spring festival of Yaoshang. It is 15 minutes in duration. It shows the deep psychological trauma of political unrest through the point of view of a widowed mother and her young son.

Toy Gun had its world premiere at the inaugural Hyderabad International Short Film Festival (HISFF) in December 2025. It achieved significant success at various national and regional film festivals throughout 2026.

== Plot ==
In Manipur, during Yaoshang, the traditional Meitei spring festival, a widowed mother (played by Leishangthem Tonthoi) is suffering from the emotional scars of past violence. The central conflict begins when her young son (played by Thingnam Parihanba) desperately asks for a toy gun to play with during the festival celebrations. As the child engages in seemingly innocent play, the sight and concept of the weapon trigger the mother's deeply suppressed trauma and fears.

== Cast and crew ==
- Leishangthem Tonthoi as the mother
- Thingnam Parihanba as the son
- Thingnam Parshuram – Writer and director
- Khumallambam Omeshwori – Producer
- Akhu Chingangbam – Music composer
- Production Banners – Freedom Ekon & Farm House Production

== Production and development ==
Toy Gun was the transition of Thingnam Parshuram's works from literature to filmmaking. Parshuram was previously recognized for his literary contributions, notably winning the Sahitya Akademi Yuva Puraskar in 2023. The film was financed and mounted by Imphal-based debutante producer Khumallambam Omeshwori. Production primarily took place in Manipur, aiming to realistically capture the visual atmosphere of the locality during the festive yet tense atmosphere of Yaoshang. Indie folk-rock musician Akhu Chingangbam composed the background score.

== Festivals and screenings ==
- World Premiere: The film officially debuted at the Prasads Multiplex, during the Hyderabad International Short Film Festival (HISFF) held from 19 to 21 December 2025. Out of 705 global entries, Toy Gun was selected as one of the 60 films screened.
- National Screening: It was invited to the national selection of the Drishyam National Documentary & Short Film Festival, held on 17–18 February 2026 at the Thunchath Ezhuthachan Malayalam University campus in Tirur, Kerala.
- Closing Film: Toy Gun served as the official closing film of the 3rd North East India Film Festival (NEIFF) on 22 March 2026, screened at Tanthapolis in Lamphel, Manipur.

== Awards and honours ==
Year	Festival / Organization	Category	Result	Ref.
2025	Hyderabad International Short Film Festival (HISFF)	Best Short Film of the Year (1st Runner-Up)	Won	
2026	Drishyam National Documentary & Short Film Festival	Special Jury Mention	Won	
2026	3rd North East India Film Festival (NEIFF)	Best Non-Feature Film	Won	

== See also ==
- Battlefield (Manipuri film)
- Story of a Forest
- The Nightmare of Bembi
- Meitei festivals
- Traditional Meitei weapons
- Meitei martial arts
- Manipur conflict (2023–present)
