= Phyllis Battelle =

American journalist

- Born: January 4, 1922; Dayton, Ohio, U.S.
- Died: February 25, 2005 (aged 83)
- Other names: Phyllis Van Horn
- Occupation: Journalist
- Relatives: Annie Maude Norton Battelle, Gordon Battelle

Phyllis Marie Battelle Van Horn (January 4, 1922 – February 25, 2005) was an American journalist, a columnist for the International News Service (and later United Press International). In 1957 she was described as "one of the most widely read columnists in America."

== Early life and education ==
Battelle was born in Dayton, Ohio, the daughter of Gordon Sellers Battelle and Ina Marie Sides Battelle. She graduated from Ohio Wesleyan University in 1944. She was a member of Delta Gamma sorority.

== Career ==
Battelle first worked in newspapers at the Dayton Journal-Herald; one of her colleagues there was Erma Bombeck, who was also just starting her career. Battelle moved to New York City after college, and was a fashion writer at Women's Wear Daily. She became women's editor for the International News Service, and wrote the service's "Assignment: America" column and from 1955 into the late 1980s. In 1951, Battelle won the Newswomen's Club of New York's award for distinguished writing. She was known for her celebrity interviews, and fashion reports, but she also covered diplomacy, the arts, and cultural controversies, including the Karen Ann Quinlan case.

Battelle also wrote a theatrical sketch, Hobby Op'ry, which was produced in Dayton in 1947. In 1974, she was named to the Order of the Delta Gamma Rose.

== Publications ==
In addition to her Assignment: America columns, which were widely syndicated, Battelle wrote for magazines including Good Housekeeping and The Ladies' Home Journal. She also worked with the Quinlan family on a book about Karen Ann Quinlan.

- "Two Phyllis Battelles Meet in San Francisco" (1956; one of her Assignment: America columns)
- "Americans Live by the Numbers" (1963; one of her Assignment: America columns)
- "Theatre for the Deaf" (1967)
- "'Let me sleep': the story of Karen Ann Quinlan" (1976)
- Karen Ann: The Quinlans Tell Their Story (1977)
- "Help Find Etan Patz" (1980)
- "The Triplets Who Found Each Other" (1981, about the brothers featured in the 2018 documentary Three Identical Strangers)
- "Down on the Farm with Sissy Spacek" (1985)
- "Pierce Brosnan: Please Don't Call Me a Sex Symbol!" (1985)
- "Raquel: Celebrating the Body Beautiful" (1985)
- "Karen Ann Quinlan: Ten Years Later" (1985)

== Personal life ==
Battelle married fellow journalist Arthur Honnold Van Horn in 1957. They lived in Pound Ridge, New York, and had a son, Jonathan. She died in 2005, at the age of 83.
