= Battell =

Battell is a surname. Notable people with the surname include:

- Carl Battell (1893–1988), Canadian ice hockey player
- Edward Battell British racing cyclist, bronze medal winner at the 1896 Olympic Games
- Joseph Battell (disambiguation), multiple people
- Ralph Battell (1649–1713), English theologian

== See also ==
- the battell, part of the 1591 collection of keyboard pieces My Ladye Nevells Booke by William Byrd
