= Battleground (disambiguation) =

A battleground is the site of a battle.

Battle Ground or battleground may also refer to:

== Arts, entertainment, and media ==
=== Films ===
- Battleground (film), a 1949 war film about the Battle of the Bulge
- BattleGround: 21 Days on the Empire's Edge (2004), a documentary about the Iraq War
- Forbidden Ground (2013 film), known as Battle Ground in the United States, an Australian action drama war film set in WWI

=== Games ===
- Battleground (video game series) by TalonSoft
  - Battleground: Bulge-Ardennes, the first game in the series
- Battleground – Crossbows and Catapults, a tabletop war game better known by its previous name, Crossbows and Catapults
- Magic: The Gathering – Battlegrounds, a 2003 strategy video game
- PUBG: Battlegrounds, a massively multiplayer online survival shooter previously known as PlayerUnknown's Battlegrounds
- Star Wars: Galactic Battlegrounds, a 2001 strategy game
- World War II Online: Battleground Europe, a massively multi-player online first-person shooter computer game

=== Literature ===
- "Battleground" (short story), a 1972 Stephen King short story which appears in Night Shift
- Battleground, the fourth book in The Corps Series by W.E.B. Griffin
- Battleground, the sixth book in the Code Red series by Chris Ryan
- Battleground: Fact and Fantasy in Palestine, a 1973 history book concerning the Arab-Israeli conflict
- Battle Ground (The Dresden Files), a 2020 novel by Jim Butcher

=== Music ===
- Battleground (Gary Stewart album), 1990
- Battleground (The Wanted album), 2011

=== Television ===
- Battleground (2014), a professional wrestling pay-per-view (PPV) event
- Battleground (American TV series), a 2012 documentary-style drama series about a political campaign
- Battleground (Nigerian TV series), a telenovela
- Battleground, a Pentagon Channel original series featuring historic films from World War II, the Korean War, the Vietnam War and more
- "Battleground", an episode of the 2006 TNT show Nightmares & Dreamscapes: From the Stories of Stephen King based on Stephen King's 1972 short story
- WWE Battleground, a WWE PPV show

== Places ==
- Battle Ground, Indiana
- Battle Ground, Washington
- Battleground, Alabama

== See also ==
- Battle (disambiguation)
- BattleBots
- Battlefield (disambiguation)
- Battlespace
