= Battlefield (disambiguation) =

A battlefield is the location of a present or historic battle involving ground warfare.

Battlefield may also refer to:

== Geography ==
- Battlefield, Glasgow, Scotland
- Battlefield, Missouri, United States
- Battlefield, Shropshire, England
- Battlefields, Zimbabwe

== Arts, entertainment, and media ==
=== Music ===
- Battlefield (album), an album by Jordin Sparks
  - "Battlefield" (song) by Jordin Sparks
- "Battlefield", a 1991 song by Diana Ross from The Force Behind the Power
- "Battlefield", a 2002 song by Blind Guardian from A Night at the Opera
- "Battlefield", a 2009 song by Iron Fire from To the Grave
- "Battlefield", a 2023 song by Birdy from Portraits
- Battlefield Band, a Scottish traditional music group

=== Other uses in arts, entertainment, and media ===
- Battlefield (2024 film), directed by Gianni Amelio
- Battlefield (Manipuri film), a 2025 Meitei language film about WWII
- Battlefield (upcoming film), directed by Christopher McQuarrie
- Battlefield (Doctor Who), a 1989 Doctor Who serial
- Battlefield (play), a 2015 play
- Battlefield (professional wrestling), a 1994 professional wrestling event
- Battlefield (American TV series), an American documentary series that explores battles of World War II and Vietnam that aired on PBS from 1994 to 2002
- Battlefield (video game series), a video game franchise developed by DICE and published by Electronic Arts
- The Battlefield, a 1985 Hong Kong television drama series
- Battlefield, a recurring stage featured in the Super Smash Bros. series.

== See also ==
- Battle (disambiguation)
- Battleground (disambiguation)
- Battlespace
- National Military Park
