= Battle (surname) =

Surname list

Battle or Battles are surnames that may refer to:

- Albrey Battle (born 1976), American football player
- Allen Battle (born 1968), American baseball player
- Arnaz Battle (born 1980), American football player
- Ashley Battle (born 1982), American basketball player
- Bill Battle (1941–2024), American college athletics administrator and football coach
- Cliff Battles (1910–1981), American football player
- Cormac Battle (born 1972), Irish musician and radio presenter
- Edgar Battle (1907–1977), American jazz performer, composer and arranger
- Greg Battle (born 1964), Canadian football player
- Helen Battle (1903–1994), Canadian marine biologist
- Hinton Battle (1956–2024), American actor, dancer, and dance instructor
- Howard Battle (born 1972), American baseball player
- Jackie Battle (born 1983), American football player
- Jim Battle (baseball) (1901–1965), American baseball player
- John Battle (basketball) (born 1962), American basketball player
- John Battle (politician) (born 1951), British politician
- John S. Battle (1890–1972), American politician and Governor of Virginia
- Jordan Battle (born 2000), American football player
- José Miguel Battle Sr. (1929–2007), American mobster
- Joseph F. Battle Jr. (1937–2001), American politician and judge
- Kathleen Battle (born 1948), American soprano
- Kemp P. Battle (1831–1919), American politician and historian
- Kenny Battle (born 1964), American basketball player
- Laurie C. Battle (1912–2000), American politician
- Lucius D. Battle (1918–2008), American diplomat
- Mike Battle (1946–2025), American football player
- Mike Battle (artist) (born 1978), American artist
- Miles Battle (born 2000), American football player
- Pat Battle (born 1959), American television journalist
- Ron Battle (born 1959), American football player
- Simone Battle (1989–2014), American actress and singer
- Tara Cross-Battle (born 1968), American volleyball player
- Texas Battle (born 1980), American actor
- Tyus Battle (born 1997), American basketball player
- Vincent M. Battle (born 1940), American diplomat
- William C. Battle (1920–2008), American diplomat

== See also ==
- Battle (disambiguation)
- Batlle
