= Love Is a Battlefield (disambiguation) =

"Love Is a Battlefield" is a 1983 American love song sung by Pat Benatar.

Love Is a Battlefield may also refer to:

- Love Is a Battlefield, the second book of the webcomic Erfworld, written by Rob Balder and illustrated by Xin Ye
- "Love Is a Battlefield", the first act of "Unconditional Love", an episode of This American Life hosted by Alix Spiegel
- Prom Wars: Love Is a Battlefield, a 2008 film starring Meaghan Rath

== Music ==
- Love Is a Battlefield, EP by Hi-Standard
- "Love Is a Battlefield", a song by CL Smooth from The Outsider

== Television ==
- "Love Is a Battlefield", an episode of Degrassi: The Next Generation
- "Love Is a Battlefield", an episode of Noah's Arc
- "Love Is a Battlefield", an episode of ER
- "Love Is a Battlefield", an episode of Green Lantern: The Animated Series
- "Love Is a Battlefield", an episode of The Challenge: Battle of the Exes
- "Love Is a Battlefield", an episode of Casualty
- "Love Is A Battlefield", an episode of The Flash

== See also ==
- Battlefield (disambiguation)
