= Battle Lake =

Battle Lake may refer to:

- Battle Lake, Minnesota
- Battle Lake (Alberta)

== See also ==
- Battle (disambiguation)
- Battle Creek (disambiguation)
- Battle River (disambiguation)
- Naval battle
- Battle
