= Battle River (disambiguation) =

Battle River is a river in central Alberta and western Saskatchewan.

Battle River may refer to:

== United States ==
- Battle River (Minnesota), a tributary of Red Lake in Minnesota, the United States

== Canada ==
- Rural Municipality of Battle River No. 438, Saskatchewan
- Battle River (electoral district), a former federal electoral district in Alberta, Canada

== See also ==
- Battle (disambiguation)
- Battle Creek (disambiguation)
- Battle Lake (disambiguation)
- River Battle, Dollywood amusement park ride
- Naval battle
- Battle
