= Tubb Town, Wyoming =

Tubb Town Field City
- Ghost town
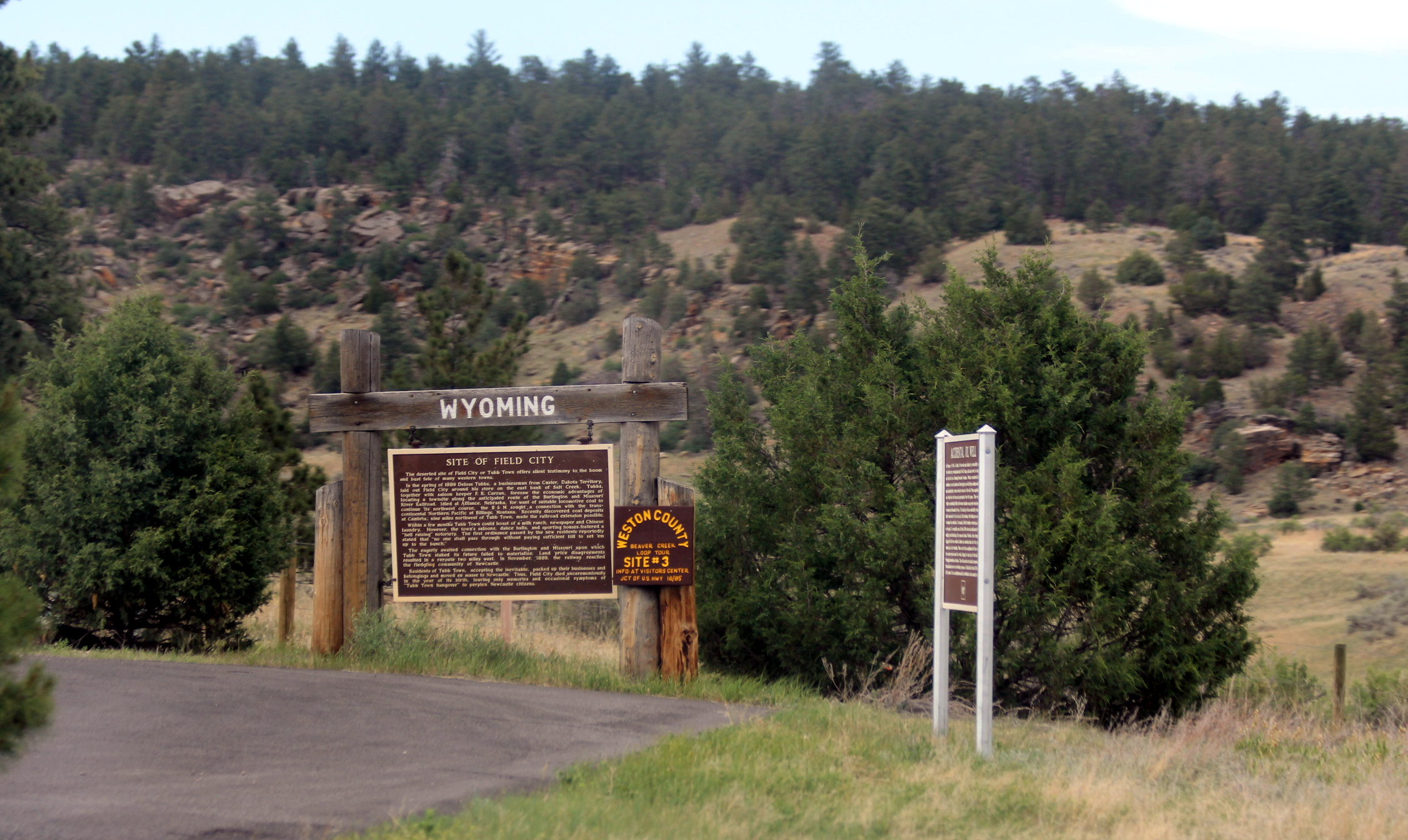
- Historical marker off U.S. 16

- Location within Wyoming Location within the United States
- Coordinates: 43°49′17″N 104°08′27″W
- Country: United States of America
- State: Wyoming
- County: Weston
- Established: spring 1889
- Abandoned: September 1889
- Founder: DeLoss Dewitt Tubbs
- Named for: founder

Population (2024)
  - Total: 0
- Time zone: UTC-7 (MST)
  - Summer (DST): UTC-6 (MDT)

Tubb Town, also known as Field City, is a ghost town in Weston County, Wyoming, United States. It was initially intended as a railroad town but quickly gained a reputation as a rough place to live, as saloons, brothels, and similar establishments became the main draw. Settled and abandoned within months during 1889, it is an early example of a boom and bust town in the Black Hills.

== Naming ==
Originally, founder DeLoss Dewitt Tubbs chose the name Field City for the new settlement. However, all residents except Tubbs called it Tubb Town in his honor, and most sources refer to it as such. Other sources refer to it as Tubtown or Tibville.

== History ==
=== Establishment and boom ===
In the late 1880s, the Chicago, Burlington, and Quincy Railroad (CBQ) made its way through Wyoming Territory, and several settlements popped up in its potential path, vying for a depot that would support a town's economy. In the spring of 1889, Field City was built by DeLoss Dewitt Tubbs, a resident of Custer, South Dakota, further down the expected site of the railroad.

At first, Field City only consisted of Tubbs's general store. Shortly thereafter, F. R. Curran, also a Custer native, arrived. He soon set up a bar, building the walls and roof over it later. Curran convinced Tubbs that the only way to encourage people to stay in town was to provide them a bar, as a general store would provide only a stopping point.

By the time construction on the saloon was complete, the town was beginning to boom. The bar was used by workers from the Burlington & Missouri River Railroad. Later, oil drilling went on in the area. The residents of Whoop-Up, Wyoming, a nearby railhead town, moved to Tubb Town, expecting it to become a large city. Tubb Town soon gained a reputation for being a very rough place to live; reportedly, the initiation was to buy drinks for everyone at the saloons. Saloons, brothels, and dance halls quickly became abundant in the town.

That always lively place, Tubtown, [sic] was the scene of unusually stirring times Saturday last. At one time a number of fights were going on in the street, and Deputy Swisher was worn out trying to stop them. No sooner would he quell one of the melees than he would see another fight going on a little ways off. He finally quit in disgust, and told the boys to fight all they wanted, but he would kill the first one who tried to use a gun. The trouble was caused by a fistic rivalry between graders and miners, large numbers of whom were in town that day. From all accounts an officer in a town like tibville [sic] couldn't be paid all he earns, as a good many frequenters there want to deal out misery to him in big chunks.

— Sundance Gazette, August 1889

Besides the bars and general store, Tubb Town sported multiple other establishments: two restaurants, a Chinese laundry, a livery stable, and a dairy farm. Frank Nelson founded the Field City Journal, which covered a political rally by Frank W. Mondell for U.S. Representative of Wyoming. The first editions of the Stockade Journal, the forerunner to Newcastle's newspaper, were published in Tubb Town. Calamity Jane is rumored to have visited the town.

Late in the summer, a makeshift school opened for the town's children, operating as a Sunday school on the weekends. (Note: Accounts differ as to how many children were enrolled. Miller (1953) claimed there were nine; Rebbeck (1968) listed ten.) F.B. Curran's brother, J.B. Curran, planned to build a Presbyterian church in Tubb Town, but a dispute between the Curran brothers delayed its establishment, and the town went bust before it could be completed.

=== Bust and abandonment ===
At the close of the summer, negotiations between local land owners and the railroad company began to break down. The plot CBQ desired for their depot was on LAK Ranch, owned by Joseph Spencer. CBQ and Spencer failed to agree on a price. On September 1, 1889, the railroad announced that it would not pass through Tubb Town in favor of Newcastle. On September 10, the first lots in Newcastle were sold, and a mass exodus from Tubb Town began. Some residents moved entire buildings from Tubb Town to Newcastle; others simply walked out of their homes. Curran reportedly set up a bar in the back of his wagon and operated for the town's residents while on the move. Within 48 hours, the town was completely deserted.

Overwhelmed by the influx of new residents, Newcastle did not have enough housing. Tubb Town's former residents largely congregated in dugouts along Cambria Creek on the outskirts of town.

=== Legacy ===
In the 1970s, local oil businessman Al Smith tried to turn the old townsite into a tourist attraction. As the post office was never actually disbanded, Smith even considered re-opening it. He bought and disassembled buildings in Newcastle and reinstalled them at the ghost town. However, this venture quickly failed and was also abandoned.

In 1980, a metal sculpture of a man panning for gold and his mule was erected in front of the Provident Federal Savings and Loan bank in Newcastle. A local contest to name the mule was held, and the winner was selected as Tubb Town Trixie.

== Geography ==
Tubb Town was located along Salt Creek and the Custer-Belle Fourche Trail, 2 miles (3.2 km) northeast of Newcastle in Weston County, Wyoming, and 7.9 miles (12.7 km) west of the South Dakota border. Today, the former townsite sits alongside U.S. Route 16. There are no remaining original buildings, and what ruins are there are the results of Smith's attempt to recreate the town. The site is now marked by a memorial commemorating the town's boom and bust.
