= Abijah Draper =

Major Abijah Draper (May 10, 1737 – May 1, 1780) was a military officer under George Washington and prominent resident of Dedham, Massachusetts.

== Personal life ==
Draper was born in Dedham, Massachusetts on May 10, 1737. On the death of his father, James, he inherited an estate at Green Lodge.

He married Alice Eaton on April 8, 1762. She was the daughter of John Eaton and Elizabeth Lovering of Purgatory in Dedham. She was born January 31, 1741, and died January 22, 1777. He then married Desire (née Metcalf), the widow of Nathaniel, March 25, 1778. Her parents were Ebenezer and Desire Cushman Foster. Desire was born at Attleboro, Massachusetts on August 12, 1746, and died at Dedham on October 23, 1815. Draper and both his wives are buried in the Old Village Cemetery. With Alice, he had children, Abijah, Ira, Rufus, James, Alice, and Abijah. With Desire, he had Lendamine.

Draper died May 1, 1780, in Dedham. He was a member of the Sons of Liberty.

== Public service ==
He was one of three, along with Nathaniel Ames and Ebenezer Battelle who erected the Pillar of Liberty in Dedham in 1766 to commemorate the repeal of the Stamp Act. The pillar stated:

To the Honor of William Pitt Esq
& other Patriots Who saved
America from impending slavery
and confirmed our most loyal Affections
to King George III by pro
curing the repeal of the Stamp Act
18th March 1766

Beginning in 1769, he served five terms as selectman.

== Military service ==
Draper held every office in the militia up to that of major and commanded a body minute men in Roxbury under George Washington. He enlisted in the revolution from Suffolk County as senior major of the First Regiment and on February 14, 1776, entered the as second major First Regiment. While at Roxbury, he was exposed to smallpox and it was supposed that he carried it to his home on one of his furloughs as his first wife, Alice, died of that disease.

== Works cited ==
- Worthington, Erastus (1827). The History of Dedham: From the Beginning of Its Settlement, in September 1635, to May 1827. Dutton and Wentworth.
- Hanson, Robert Brand (1976). Dedham, Massachusetts, 1635-1890. Dedham Historical Society.
