= Standpatter Republican =

U.S. political term

"Standpatter", or "stand-patter", was a term used in US political history in the early 20th century, during the Progressive Era, to describe the more conservative members of the Republican Party than other members, who were called "insurgents" or "progressives". The former were said to be philosophically similar to those of the earlier Stalwart faction.

== History ==
The term is said to have first been used in a political context by Joseph G. Cannon in 1896 with regard to US tariffs. It was popularised following Senator Mark Hanna's "stand pat speech" in 1901, which suggested that "all that was necessary for Republican victory was, in poker parlance, to stand pat". In poker, a player who does not want to trade any cards declares his intention to "stand pat." A standpatter Republican was particularly conservative and was unwilling to trade or compromise. The poker parlance "stand pat" has since been used in political contexts to refer to a conservative viewpoint although the description of individuals as "standpatters" is less common.

After the term's popularisation, even those unfamiliar with the game of poker understood the description.

== Prominent members ==
- Nelson Aldrich
- William B. Allison
- Joseph Foraker
- Mark Hanna
- Frank W. Mondell
- Boies Penrose
- Thomas C. Platt
- John Coit Spooner

== See also ==
- Progressive Era
- Glossary of poker terms
