= Pillar of Liberty =

Monument

Coordinates: 42°14′56″N 71°10′36″W

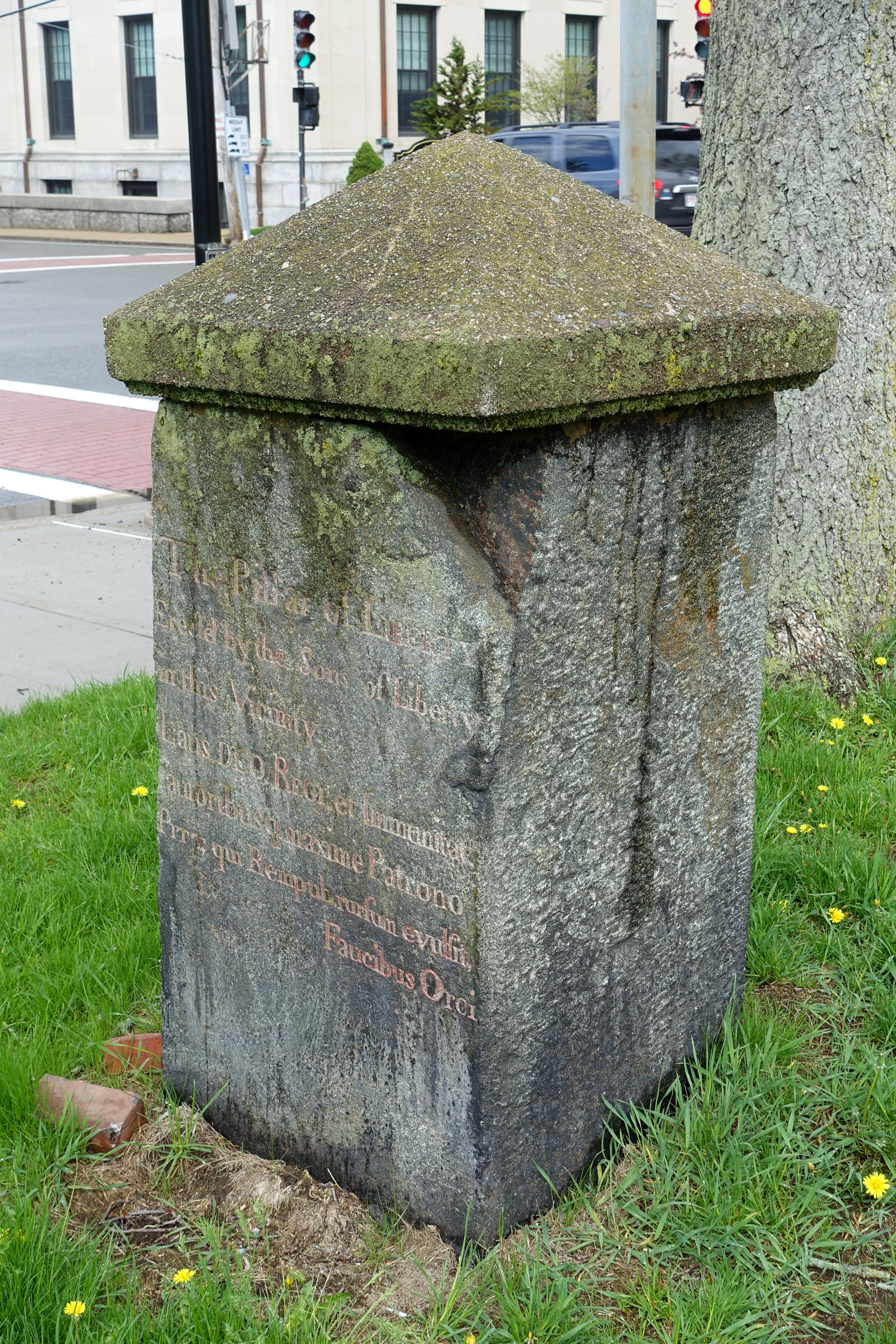
The base of the Pillar of Liberty

The Pillar of Liberty is a monument in Dedham, Massachusetts, commemorating the repeal of the Stamp Act. Erected by the Sons of Liberty, it originally had a pillar with a bust of William Pitt on top.

== Background ==
When Parliament imposed the Stamp Act 1765 on the 13 colonies, there was little effect in Dedham and thus little outcry. The one person most affected was Dr. Nathaniel Ames who would have to pay for each sheet of paper used in his almanac, his liquor license, and for his medical papers. He began stirring up his fellow townsmen, and Town Meeting appointed a committee to draft a set of instructions to Samuel Dexter, their representative in the Great and General Court. Seven men were appointed to the committee, but their draft was likely written by Ames. The letter, which instructed Dexter to oppose the Act, was unanimously approved on October 21, 1765.

When the act was repealed, there was great rejoicing in Boston but just an "illumination" at the Ames Tavern. Some of those celebrating included the Sons of Liberty, whose Dedham Chapter included Nathaniel Ames, Ebenezer Battelle, Abijah Draper, and Dr. John Sprague, as well as the Free Brothers, a similar group which included Ames, Battelle, Sam West, Manasseh Cutler, Nat Fisher, and Joseph Ellis Jr.

== Erection ==
Word arrived in Boston about the repeal of the Stamp Act on May 16, 1766. Five days later, Nathaniel Ames recorded in his diary that a stone cutter was at work on a monument memorializing the repeal. It took 11 or 12 days worth of work throughout the spring and summer to create the base.

On July 22, 1766, Ames, Ebenezer Battelle, and Abijah Draper and the Sons of Liberty placed the base of the Pillar of Liberty on the church green at the corner of High and Court streets. A "vast concourse of people" attended its erection. The base, made out of a block of granite from Battelle's farm that had been squared, polished, had an inscription written by Ames. It was painted on July 28.

Seven months later, a 10-12' classical pillar of dark New England granite, likely dug from somewhere between the central village and West Dedham, was added with a bust of William Pitt the Elder. The bust was carved by Simeon Skilling, a Boston craftsman best known producing figureheads for ships. The column was carved by Daniel Goodkin, and the base was made by a local stone cutter named Howard. It was known thereafter as Pitt's Head.

Pitt was credited, according to the inscription on the base, of having "saved America from impending slavery, and confirmed our most loyal affection to King George III by procuring a repeal of the Stamp Act." It is the only monument known to have been erected by the Sons of Liberty.

In inscription stated on the base's north face:

The Pillar of Liberty
To the Honor of William Pitt Esq^{r}
& other Patriots who saved
America from impending slavery
and confirmed our most loyal Affections
to King George III by pro
curing the repeal of the Stamp Act
18th March 1766

And on its west face:

The Pillar of Liberty
Erected by the Sons of Liberty
in this Vicinity
Laus DEO REGI et Immunitat^{m}
autoribusq. maxine Patrono
Pitt, qui Rempub. rurfum evulfit
Faucibus Orci.
[Praise to God, the King, and the
exceptional work of Pitt, the great-
est benefactor, who plucked the
republic from the jaws of Hell.

The easterly face shows signs of being worked upon with tools, possibly to sink a plaque into it.

== Destruction ==
The monument was destroyed on the night of May 11, 1769, when Parliament again tried to tax the colonies. Samuel Doggett offered a $12 reward for any information on who may have destroyed it.

It is said that the boys of the town used Pitt's head as a football for years after it was destroyed.

== 250th anniversary of Dedham ==
In 1828, the pillar was moved across Court Street and was later moved back to its original location for the 250th anniversary of the Town. For the 200th and the 250th anniversaries of the Town of Dedham, the letters inscribed into the stone were painted so that they might be better read. At the 250th in 1886, a bronze tablet was inserted bearing the inscription:

THIS STONE WAS FIRST
PLACED NEAR THIS SPOT
JULY 22, 1766. IT SUPPORTED
A WOODEN COLUMN SURMOUNTED
BY A BUST OF WILLIAM PITT.
BOTH COLUMN AND BUST DISAPPEARED ABOUT THE
CLOSE OF THE LAST CENTURY.
THE STONE WAS
REMOVED FROM THE OPPOSITE
CORNER IN 1886.

== Works cited ==
- Clarke, Wm. Horatio (1903). Mid-Century Memories of Dedham. Dedham Historical Society.
- Hanson, Robert Brand (1976). Dedham, Massachusetts, 1635-1890. Dedham Historical Society.
- Parr, James L. (2009). Dedham: Historic and Heroic Tales From Shiretown. The History Press. ISBN 978-1-59629-750-0.
- Worthington, Erastus; Hildreth, Henry O; Hill, Don Gleason (1887). "The Pillar of Liberty". Proceedings at the Celebration of the Two Hundred and Fiftieth Anniversary of the Incorporation of the Town of Dedham, Massachusetts, September 21, 1886. J. Wilson and son, University Press.
