= Battelle, Alabama =

- Unincorporated community
- Location within Alabama
- Coordinates: 34°38′58″N 85°33′55″W
- Country: United States
- State: Alabama
- County: DeKalb
- Elevation: 912 ft (278 m)
- Time zone: UTC-6 (Central (CST))
  - Summer (DST): UTC-5 (CDT)
- Area code: 256
- GNIS feature ID: 156036

Battelle is an unincorporated community in DeKalb County, Alabama, United States. Battelle was once a thriving mining community which was spread in a north – south line along the foot of Lookout Mountain five miles north of Valley Head, Alabama.

At the beginning of the 20th century, Battelle included hundreds of houses, a school, a commissary, a hotel and post office, in addition to the furnace and coke ovens. Battelle had a water system with water from a spring that was pumped into a large wooden tank and then piped into the surrounding homes.

Mining prospectors found pockets of a fairly good grade of iron ore, coal and limestone, all the ingredients for making pig iron. The Lookout Mountain Iron Company was consequently formed by a group of Ohio mining speculators, headed by Colonel John Gordon Battelle. Although he already had large investments in the iron and steel industry in Ohio and the Midwest, Battelle took a great personal interest in the operation to which he gave his name. He moved there and personally supervised the mine activity until it was determined that the mineral deposits were of insufficient quality or quantity to compete with the mines being developed in the Birmingham area. In 1905 the furnace was placed on a standby basis and the houses and other properties gradually liquidated.

During World War I, the British government purchased the furnace, which was then dismantled and shipped to Calcutta, India.

Although Battelle's financial venture in DeKalb County proved unsuccessful; he did very well with other investments. When he died in 1918 he left $4,000,000 to his only son, Gordon Battelle. The younger Battelle, who died in 1923, willed the fortune to the Battelle Memorial Institute of Columbus, Ohio.

After the mining company ceased operations at Battelle and the better homes were sold and moved, there was never much activity in the community. The Belcher Lumber Company of Centerville operated there for a few years in the 1940s. In 1969 when the Alabama Great Southern Railroad train derailed and propane tanks exploded there, news accounts gave the site of the wreck as Battelle.
