= Battel (disambiguation) =

Battel is a term used at the University of Oxford for the food ordered by members of the college.

Battel may also refer to:

- Battel, a hamlet of Mechelen, historical part of the Lordship of Mechelen
- Kaiju Big Battel, American performance entertainment troupe based in Boston

== People ==
- Albert Battel (1891–1952), German Wehrmacht officer, lawyer, and humanitarian
- Carlo Battel (b. 1972), Italian ski mountaineer
- Edward Battel or Battell, British racing cyclist

== See also ==
- Battle (disambiguation)
