= Gordon Battelle (minister) =

American clergyman (1814–1862)

- Born: November 14, 1814; Newport, Washington County, Ohio, US
- Died: August 7, 1862 (aged 47); Washington, D. C., US
- Education: Allegheny College
- Occupations: Methodist Minister, educator, chaplain
- Known for: abolitionist, helped establish West Virginia
- Spouse: Maria Louise Tucker

Gordon Battelle (November 14, 1814 – August 7, 1862) was a Methodist minister, educator, abolitionist, chaplain and one of the founders of the state of West Virginia during the American Civil War.

== Early life and education ==
Born in Newport, Washington County, Ohio on November 14, 1814, to Ebenezer Battelle and his wife Mary (Molly) Greene Battelle, Gordon Battelle had both older and younger brothers and sisters. He attended the Marietta Collegiate Institute (now Marietta College) in his Ohio county's seat, where he met fellow student Francis Pierpont, who became his lifelong friend. Battelle then continued his education (for Christian ministry) at Allegheny College at Meadville, Pennsylvania, graduating with the highest rank in his class and receiving a B.A. degree in 1840. Allegheny College later awarded him a master's degree in 1843, and Ohio University awarded him an honorary Doctor of Divinity degree in 1861.

Battele married Maria Louise Tucker from Vermont some time after his graduation. They had several children, not all of whom reached adulthood: Mary S. (b. 1844), John Gordon Battelle (b. 1845), Ellen V. Battelle Dietrick (1847-1895), Julia E. (b. 1849), Fannie (b.1851), James Waldo Battelle (1853 - 1854), Emma (b. 1855) and Cora Battelle Fenton (b. 1859).

== Career and Ministry ==
The young graduate moved across the Ohio River and taught at the newly established Asbury Academy in Parkersburg in what was then the Commonwealth of Virginia (although sponsored by the East Ohio Conference of the Methodist Church). Battelle received his preaching license in 1842 and was ordained as a Methodist deacon in 1847 and minister in 1849. By that time Battelle had become the principal of the Northwestern Virginia Academy at Clarksburg, a position he held until 1851, when he resigned to concentrate on his ministry (at a church in Charleston). The Clarksburg academy was also technically new, but had the same board of Trustees as the Randolph Academy chartered there in 1787.

Battelle led the Charleston congregation for two years before accepting another position in Clarksburg. In 1855, he accepted an appointment as presiding elder of the church's Clarksburg District. He also served as a delegate to the Methodist Episcopal Church general conferences in 1856, 1859 and 1860. In 1859, he accepted a call to serve a congregation in Wheeling and became involved in the growing division between slaveholding Virginians who proposed to secede from the Union. Battelle wrote articles in the Wheeling Intelligencer against disunion, as well as against slavery.

== American Civil War ==
After the Virginia Secession Convention of 1861 approved secession despite the opposition of many delegates from the Commonwealth's northwest corner, the Wheeling Convention established the Restored Government of Virginia, and Rev. Battelle's old schoolmate Francis Pierpont became its Governor. Battelle continued to write and publish about the difficulties in establishing a new state.

In October 1861, Gov. Pierpont appointed Rev. Battelle as an official visitor to Federal military camps to investigate reports of poor conditions, particularly concerning medical supplies and a shortage of doctors and nurses. His reports on conditions at Philippi, Elkwater, and Cheat Mountain helped alleviate those conditions.

Beginning November 1, 1861, Rev. Battelle also served as chaplain of the 1st West Virginia Infantry.

Battelle was also among the many Methodist ministers elected in October 1861 to serve as delegates to the West Virginia Constitutional Convention. Beginning on November 26, 1861, he represented Ohio County and served on the Committee on Education. He advocated establishing a system of free public schools in the new state (which was adopted), but his two proposals forbidding bringing slaves into the new state and gradually abolishing slavery within it were tabled. Partly as a result, however, of his published"An Address to the Constitutional Convention and the People of West Virginia" Congress refused to admit West Virginia as a new state until its people adopted a resolution against slavery (the Waitman Willey amendment) in March 1863.

== Death and legacy ==
However, that occurred after Battelle's unexpected death. During a trip to investigate sanitary conditions in the military camps around Washington, D.C., Rev. Battelle died of typhoid fever on July 5, 1862.

His grandson Gordon Battelle founded Battelle Memorial Institute.

Battelle Township in Monongalia County, West Virginia was named in his honor.
