= Battlefields, Zimbabwe =

Coordinates: 18°36′S 29°50′E

Battlefields is a small settlement in Mashonaland West province in Zimbabwe. It is located off the main road from Harare to Bulawayo between Kadoma and Kwekwe. The name Battlefields was given not on account of any fighting which took place there, but because many of the mining claims and reefs were named after famous battles, such as Trafalgar and Tel el-Kebir.

== 2019 mining accident ==
In February 2019, at least 38 illegal gold panners were trapped by flood water in two mine shafts, after heavy rainfall caused a dam wall to burst. By 17 February, 8 people had been rescued and 24 bodies recovered, with dozens more still missing and feared dead.
