= Cambria, Wyoming =

Ghost town in Wyoming, US

- Town
- Location of Cambria within Wyoming. Cambria (the United States)
- Coordinates: 43°56′21″N 104°12′27″W
- Country: United States
- State: Wyoming
- County: Weston County
- Founded: 1889
- Post office established: 1890
- Abandoned: c. 1928
- Founder: Kilpatrick Brothers & Collins
- Elevation: 5,121 ft (1,561 m)

Population (2024)
  - Total: 0
- Time zone: UTC-7 (MST)
  - Summer (DST): UTC-6 (MDT)

Cambria (1889–1928) is a ghost town located in the Black Hills of Weston County, Wyoming, United States. It was a successful coal mining town for decades.

== History ==
=== Founding ===
Cambria started out as a mining town. It is possible that the coal in the area was used by early Western settlers to heat their homes. After the American Civil War, demand for coal skyrocketed as railroads began westward expansion. The Chicago, Burlington & Quincy Railroad stopped its westward expansion in Alliance, Nebraska, due to high eastern coal costs. Kilpatrick Brothers & Collins (KB&C) sent prospectors into the Black Hills to search for coal in the hopes of securing a railroad contract with the railroad. In 1887, high-grade anthracite deposits were discovered by Frank Mondell inside Coal Creek Canyon or Little Oil Creek Canyon, Wyoming. This area was renamed Cambria Canyon. The Cambria Fuel Company was founded by KB&C with Frank Mondell as its manager. The Chicago, Burlington & Quincy Railroad signed the contract and laid tracks north from Newcastle, Wyoming to the new mine, which were completed in 1889.

=== Life in Cambria ===
KB&C took over the building of Cambria. One of the first buildings was a hospital with four beds, an operation room, and eventually an x-ray room. The company also built a 2,345-foot (715 m) deep well that could pump 325,000 US gallons (1,230,000 L; 271,000 imp gal) of water per day and used compressed air to bring the water to the top; a reservoir; a school; three churches; two hotels (one of which was three stories high); a lodge hall; a bank; a courthouse; offices; a concert band; a boarding house for bachelor workers; an opera house, which once sold out a production of Faust; a recreation building that included billiard and pool tables and a bowling alley; and about 150 houses for miners and their families. There was a commissary store at which Company script could be used. The company issued small, cheap coins called "clackers", so named for the noise they made. This store was even visited by people who were not from the Black Hills. In June 1889, the first property patents were signed to Joseph M. and Robert J. Kilpatrick. A post office was added in 1890. As the town grew, several other stores sprang up, many of which had false fronts. A cemetery was located northeast of town. Many deaths in Cambria resulted from disease (most of these victims were children) and mining disasters. The mining company later placed a prohibition on all alcohol stronger than beer, and saloons and dance halls were banned. This resulted in bootlegging. Fatal brawls were not uncommon in the town. However, a daily beer wagon arrived from Newcastle to satisfy the miners.

The first Catholic church service in Cambria was held in 1891 and was led by Reverend P. Cassidy, a resident of Hot Springs, South Dakota. The church services were attended by members of several different denominations. The St. James Roman Catholic Church was constructed by Reverend P. J. Lynch in 1903, under a 99-year lease from the company that cost $2,000. Cambria was also home to an Episcopal church, which was once visited by Ethelbert Talbot.

The Grand Lodge was home to three fraternities: the Independent Order of Odd Fellows, the Knights of Pythias, and the Improved Order of Red Men, which was not added until 1894. This hall also included a swimming pool and gym. Among the more famous members of the Hall were Solomon Star, the business partner of Seth Bullock; Edward McDonald, the sheriff of Lawrence County, South Dakota, mayor of Deadwood, South Dakota, and secretary of the Deadwood Lodge; and J. F. Edmonds, the Past Grand Chancellor and Past Grand Prelate of Dakota Territory.

In 1904, the Cambria Coal Company announced that the population of the town was about 1,400, but the official 1900 census counted 966 residents. In 1923, the company started building a small resort facility known as Cambria Casino Park, which would cost $250,000 to finish. Construction was completed in 1928.

=== The mining operations ===
In 1878, James LeGraves began panning for salt on Salt Creek, Wyoming. This salt pan was 6 by 60 feet (1.8 m × 18.3 m), and the site became famous as salt licks for deer where his wagons stopped. The salt was mainly used for chlorination of the gold ore. However, the salt was impure, and his operation failed. The Cambria Fuel Company, which consisted of six mines built throughout the valley, began operation on December 4, 1889. The mining equipment was shipped from Nebraska using wagon trains and lowered into place by block and tackle. The coal was hauled using trestles and grounded railroad tracks that connected to bins, which were located over the central railroad. 74 beehive ovens were built to convert waste coal into coke, which was then shipped to smelters throughout the Black Hills. The boilers were emptied by an electric conveyor system, and could only be operated by one person. At one point, the coke was worth $5.60 a ton in gold. Cambria coal included small amounts of gold ore, which sold for $2 per ton. Horses and mules were brought into town for mine use by a KB&C-owned ranch. An electrical system was installed, which was powered by 1,800 horsepower steam engines. One of the first requirements to work in the mine was to buy a homestead adjacent to the mine and then sell the property and mineral rights to the Cambria Fuel Company. Through this method, the company eventually accumulated 17,000 acres. The company later contracted workers from Sicily, Greece, Macedonia, Slovenia, and other European countries. The company paid for their passage to the United States and gave them clothing and housing. Between 1900 and 1904, about 550-750 men were working at the mine. In 1907, the Cambria Salt Company opened in an attempt to revive the old salt mines, but the operation failed within four years. In 1910, KB&C sold the mines to investors in the East. Overall, the Cambria Fuel Company produced about 13 million tons of bituminous coal worth $20 million.

=== Decline and abandonment of Cambria ===
By 1928, the anthracite vein had been thinned down to less than three feet. In February 1928, Cambria Fuel Company announced the closing of the mine by April 1, unless new deposits were found. At 4:30 P.M. on March 15, 1928, the whistle blew for the final time and reportedly sounded the disaster warning, which consisted of a series of short blasts. According to legend, the town went into a sort of chaos. Many miners didn't pack up their belongings before they left to find new work. Other miners, sure the mine would reopen, went on vacation. By the evening, the shop owners and clerks had left town. The town was deserted so quickly that the courthouse lawn sprinkler was said to have been left running until the reservoir was emptied. However, the exodus was not actually that quick. Closing ceremonies were done on April 28, 1928. Cambrians marked the occasion with a dance, music, and speeches. The post office was discontinued on December 31, 1928. The Cambria Casino Park was sold to Cambria Park Commissioners; the facility survived until 1932, when it was leased. In 1929, the railroad tracks were removed by the company with the permission of the Interstate Commerce Commission. Several buildings were sold and their businesses moved. Others were salvaged for lumber or vandalized. The town wasn't thoroughly dismantled until World War II.

=== Today ===
The Cambria Casino Park is now a resort sometimes leased to the Flying V Ranch, and still operates as a bed and breakfast known as the Flying V Cambria Inn. Several houses are still standing on the site today. The home of the superintendent, the church steeple, the mule stables, the bank and office vaults, a few garages, many mine buildings, and cold cellars are also among the ruins. The 365 steps leading up to where the school and residential area once stood are still intact. Clearings through the trees mark where the paths and roads were.

== Geography ==
Cambria was located 8 miles (13 km) north of Newcastle, just off U.S. Highway 85.

== Demographics ==
In 1895, Cambria had a population of 329. In 1900, official U.S. Census records counted 966 people living in Cambria, but the company reported an approximate number of 1,400. In 1904, somewhere between 550 and 750 men were employed at the site. In 1928, the town became abandoned.

== Notable person ==
- Franklin Wheeler Mondell (1860–1939), manager of Cambria Fuel Company and U.S. representative of Wyoming
