= Battle Creek (Lake Campbell) =

Stream in South Dakota, U.S.

Coordinates: 44°11′27″N 96°52′04″W

Battle Creek is a stream in the U.S. state of South Dakota. It is a tributary of Lake Campbell.

Battle Creek was named for a skirmish between Indians and incoming whites.

== See also ==
- List of rivers of South Dakota
