= Story of a Forest =

- Poster
- Meitei: ꯁ꯭ꯇꯣꯔꯤ ꯑꯣꯐ ꯑ ꯐꯣꯔꯦꯁ꯭ꯠ
- Directed by: Trishul Yumnam and Yaso Sharma
- Produced by: National Film Development Corporation of India
- Starring: Soma Laishram; Khwairakpam Bishwamittra
- Release date: 2026
- Running time: 15 minutes
- Country: India
- Language: Meitei (Manipuri)

Story of a Forest, officially known as Story of A Forest, (Note: with capital letter "A" in its official name) is a 2026 Indian Meitei language animation film. It is 15 minutes long in duration. It is a children's short film. It is about a story of a boy named Ayangba who travels across the hills and plains of Manipur. It is directed by Trishul Yumnam and Yaso Sharma, and produced by the National Film Development Corporation of India.

The film director Trishul Yumnam relates the film with the beliefs of Meitei people that forests are sacred spaces, inhabited by Umang Lai, the forest deities.

== Design ==
The Story of a Forest is made in two-dimensional hand-drawn animation form.

== Plot ==
Deep in the hills of the Imphal Valley, a young boy named Ayangba dreams of becoming strong and proving himself. He loves football and is very eager to win and show his skills. One day, he ignores his coach and friends and takes a shortcut through a thick, forbidden forest during practice. He believes this will save time, but he does not know that the forest is a sacred place and full of life. As Ayangba goes deeper inside, strange things begin to happen. The forest feels alive. He sees and feels nature responding to him, the trees, bees, water, and flowers seem to notice his presence. Slowly, he enters a magical world hidden within the forest. There, he meets a mysterious being made of light and nature. This being challenges him and shows him that not everything must be controlled or conquered. Through a special, almost magical game of football, Ayangba learns to move with patience, respect, and awareness. In the end, he understands that nature is not something to fight against. It is something to live with in balance. His football is no longer just about pride or winning, it becomes a way to connect with the world around him. Ayangba returns changed, with a new respect for the forest, nature, and life itself.

== Cast and crew ==
- The following artists take the voice roles of the characters:
  - Soma Laishram - voices as Ayangba.
  - Khwarakpam Biswamittra - as a teacher.
- Lead animator of the film is Sachindra Moirangthem. He is helped by the animators, Umarani Soraisam and Bidyananda Kumar Ngangbam.
- Other background artists (painters) are Rahul Laishram and Saikhom Nongpokhenba Meitei.

== Media response ==
The Sangai Express and The Assam Tribune remark about the film as "Visually poetic and deeply resonant, Story of A Forest is a lyrical ode to nature, childhood curiosity, and the awakening of an environmental conscience, an intimate yet universal tale, woven with magic, wonder, and wisdom."

== International reception ==
Story of a Forest got the official selection among the 15 films selected for the national animation film competition of the 19th Mumbai International Film Festival (MIFF), 2026 organised by the Union Ministry of Information and Broadcasting, of the Government of India, in Mumbai.

== See also ==
- Battlefield (Manipuri film)
- Keibu Keioiba (film)
