= The Battle (Brack) =

Painting by John Brack

- Artist: John Brack
- Year: 1983
- Medium: oil on canvas
- Dimensions: 203 cm × 274 cm (80 in × 108 in)
- Location: National Gallery of Australia, Canberra
- Website: artsearch.nga.gov.au

The Battle is a 1983 painting by Australian artist John Brack.

The painting is part of a series of works by Brack symbolically depicting the 1815 Battle of Waterloo. These works represents combatants as drawing tools—officers as pens and soldiers as pencils. It depicts British troops attempting to encircle French forces while the Prussians attack the eastern flank.

Composed between 1981 and 1983, The Battle is Brack's largest painting.

The work was influenced by Brack's experience as an artillery officer in World War II where he observed the difficulty of rendering a battle in a single painting

One could either paint a single event very close up, like an exploding shell blowing people into horrible mutilated fragments, or alternatively paint a very general view where the reality of the battle would be totally lost. When [Brack] was in Europe and saw at first hand some of the famous battle paintings, he felt these observations were confirmed

— Sasha Grishin,

The National Gallery of Australia notes Brack saw a battle as "a metaphor for general conflict in human life, our power relations, organisational structures, oppression, futility and the teetering relationship between balance and instability."

== Reception ==
The work was first unveiled at an exhibition in Melbourne in 1983. The initial reviews were "overwhelmingly positive".

The Age art critic Memory Holloway stated the work was "one of the most important pictures painted in Australia over the past five years".

Robery Rooney from The Australian described the work as "a rich tapestry of superbly organised order and disorder as one of history's war games is played with comic precision by opposing armies of optically dazzling pens and pencils - the instruments of his profession."

== Provenance ==
Brack's family donated the work to the National Gallery of Australia in 1992 and it remains part of their collection.
