= Frank W. Mondell =

American politician, businessman and lawyer (1860–1939)

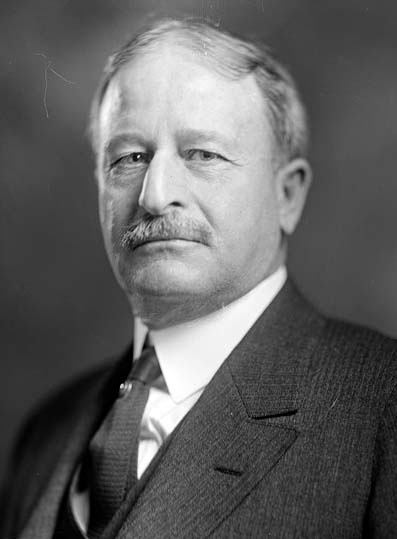
- Harris & Ewing portrait of Mondell, taken between 1905 and 1939

House Majority leader
- In office March 4, 1919 – March 3, 1923
- Preceded by: Claude Kitchin
- Succeeded by: Nicholas Longworth

Member of the U.S. House of Representatives from Wyoming's at-large district
- In office March 4, 1899 – March 3, 1923
- Preceded by: John E. Osborne
- Succeeded by: Charles E. Winter
- In office March 4, 1895 – March 3, 1897
- Preceded by: Henry A. Coffeen
- Succeeded by: John E. Osborne

President of the Wyoming Senate
- In office January 10 – February 18, 1893

Member of the Wyoming Senate from the Crook and Weston County district
- In office November 12, 1890 – February 10, 1891
- In office January 10 – February 18, 1893

Personal details
- Born: Frank Wheeler Mondell; November 6, 1860 St. Louis, Missouri, US
- Died: August 6, 1939 (aged 78) Washington, D.C., US
- Resting place: Cedar Hill Cemetery
- Party: Republican
- Occupation: Politician, businessman, lawyer

Frank Wheeler Mondell (November 6, 1860 – August 6, 1939) was an American politician, businessman, and lawyer. A Republican, he was a member of the United States House of Representatives from Wyoming. He also served as the House Majority leader.

Born in St. Louis, Mondell was orphaned as a child and grew up in Iowa. He moved about the Western United States, where he worked construction jobs. The discoverer of a large coal deposit in Wyoming, he became a noted figure in the state, serving in its state senate. He represented the state's at-large district in the House for 13 terms, from 1895 to 1897, and again from 1899 to 1923.

A conservative, Mondell was prominent among standpatter Republicans. He primarily developed legislation regarding land management. He was chairman of the Committees on Irrigation and Arid Lands, as which he pushed for large irrigation projects in the Western United States. After serving in Congress, he remained in Washington, D.C., becoming a lawyer there.

== Early life and early career ==
Mondell was born on November 6, 1860, in St. Louis, the son of Ephraim Wheeler Mondell and Nancy Brown Mondell. He was orphaned at some point between the ages of five and seven; his mother died from unknown causes, and his father served in the Union army during the American Civil War, dying from his injuries shortly thereafter.

Mondell then moved to Iowa with distant family, later being adopted by a Congregational minister and pioneer named Upton. He lived in Monona for two years before the family moved onto a farm in Excelsior Township, Dickinson County, Iowa. There, he was homeschooled and later attended a one-room school. At age 15, he began working as a trapper.

At age 18, Mondell moved to Chicago, working odd jobs there for a year. For the eight years that followed, he relocated throughout the Western United States. He worked as a construction manager near Leadville, Colorado, among other odd jobs in construction and engineering.

In 1887, Mondell moved to northeastern Wyoming. In September of that year, he discovered the Cambria coal mine, which led to an extension of the Chicago, Burlington and Quincy Railroad reaching the section of Wyoming. He also developed oilfields. Through the late 1880s, he helped establish the city of Newcastle, and served as its first mayor, from 1888 to 1895.

== Political career ==
=== Wyoming State Legislature ===
Early in his political career, Mondell was disinclined to holding political office, with Wyoming Public Radio later describing him as a "reluctant politician". He declined attending a political convention in Sundance, in order to not be nominated for the Wyoming Senate, but was nominated despite that.

During the early Wyoming legislatures, Crook and Weston Counties were consolidated into one Senate district, which led to fears that Republicans would be under-represented in the Legislature. To counteract this, Mondell agreed to run for the State Senate. He won, serving in the first and second Wyoming legislature, from November 12, 1890, to January 10, 1891, and again from January 10, to February 18, 1893. He served as its president during the second legislature, from January 10, to February 18, 1893. He was the youngest member of the first Wyoming legislature. After holding the Senate office, he began to more actively pursue electoral politics.

=== United States House of Representatives ===
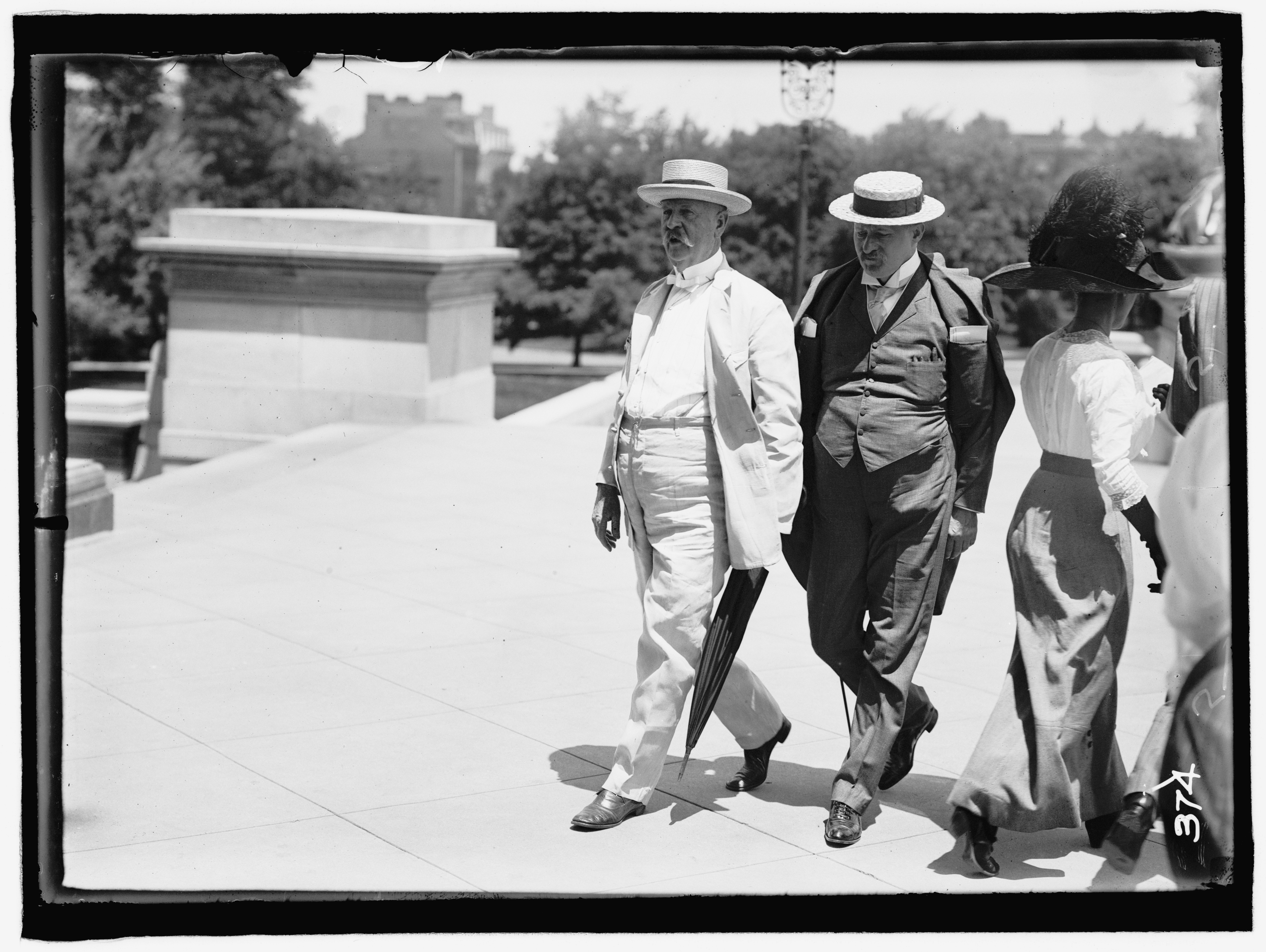
Mondell (right) with Senator Augustus O. Bacon, 1911

Mondell planned to run in the 1894 Wyoming gubernatorial election, but later shifted to the 1894 United States House of Representatives elections in Wyoming. He won, and became a member of the House representing Wyoming's at-large district. He served from March 4, 1895, to March 3, 1897. While serving, he was a member of the Committees on Mines and Mining and on Irrigation and Arid Lands. He lost the following election.

In 1898, Mondell was re-elected to the House, serving from March 4, 1899, to March 3, 1923. He was House Majority leader from March 4, 1919, to March 3, 1923. While in the House, he was chairman of the Committees on Irrigation and Arid Lands and on Public Lands and Surveys. He was also a member of the Committiee on Appropriations and on Military Affairs.

Mondell declined to run in the following election, instead running for the United States Senate, losing to Democrat incumbent John B. Kendrick. At some previous point, he anticipated to run for Senator, but dropped out to let Francis E. Warren run again.

== Policy and views ==
Ideologically conservative, Mondell was a standpatter Republican. He was a delegate to the Republican National Conventions of 1892, 1900, 1904, 1908, 1912, and 1924; at the 1924 Convention, he was a permanent chairman. He stated that he went along with the Republican Party, so long as it benefitted the Western United States. He supported individualism and states' rights.

=== Economy ===
Economically, Mondell was a protectionist who supported tariffs. He opposed the federal government giving funding to states. During the Panic of 1893, he said the crisis was caused by bimetallism and lowered tariffs. He was free silver, which is believed to have caused his Congressional defeat in 1897. While Representatives questioned if a tariff on Puerto Rican sugar was constitutional, he argued that the Constitution did not extend to United States territories, so a tariff on Puerto Rico was allowed.

In 1906, Republican Representatives introduced a bill to make a more relaxed tariff on sugar beet imports from the Philippines. Mondell was a staunch opponent of the bill, a rare instance of him opposing Republican economic policy. He argued against it, as it would have endangered American industry. He opposed the Revenue Act of 1913.

=== Land management ===
As a politician, Mondell used his powers primarily to push land development legislation. On land policy, he believed that private land was what made the United States a free country. As a result, he believed that all public lands in the United States should be transferred to private, individual ownership. He, in retrospect, supported the Homestead Acts, as they allowed this transition to occur, and opposed the Desert Land Act and the Timber and Stone Act, for reversing parts of the Homestead Acts. He authored the Enlarged Homestead Act of 1909, later saying he believed it to have been the best law he introduced to Congress.

In his first term in the House, Mondell opposed the General Revision Act due to the land that it declared public area was uninspected, with the declarative Bighorn Mountains being vastly unforested. On Wyoming's Indian reservations, he wished the tribes respected the state's hunting laws.

In Congress, Mondell focused on legislation to build irrigation systems. In 1902, he reported and piloted the Newlands Reclamation Act through the House. In 1904 and 1905, he proposed that 1.5 million acres be taken from the Wind River Indian Reservation in order to create the Wind River Irrigation Project. The proposal was negotiated by James McLaughlin, and the price of the land was set at $2,200,000. The land was sold to the United States government in early 1904.

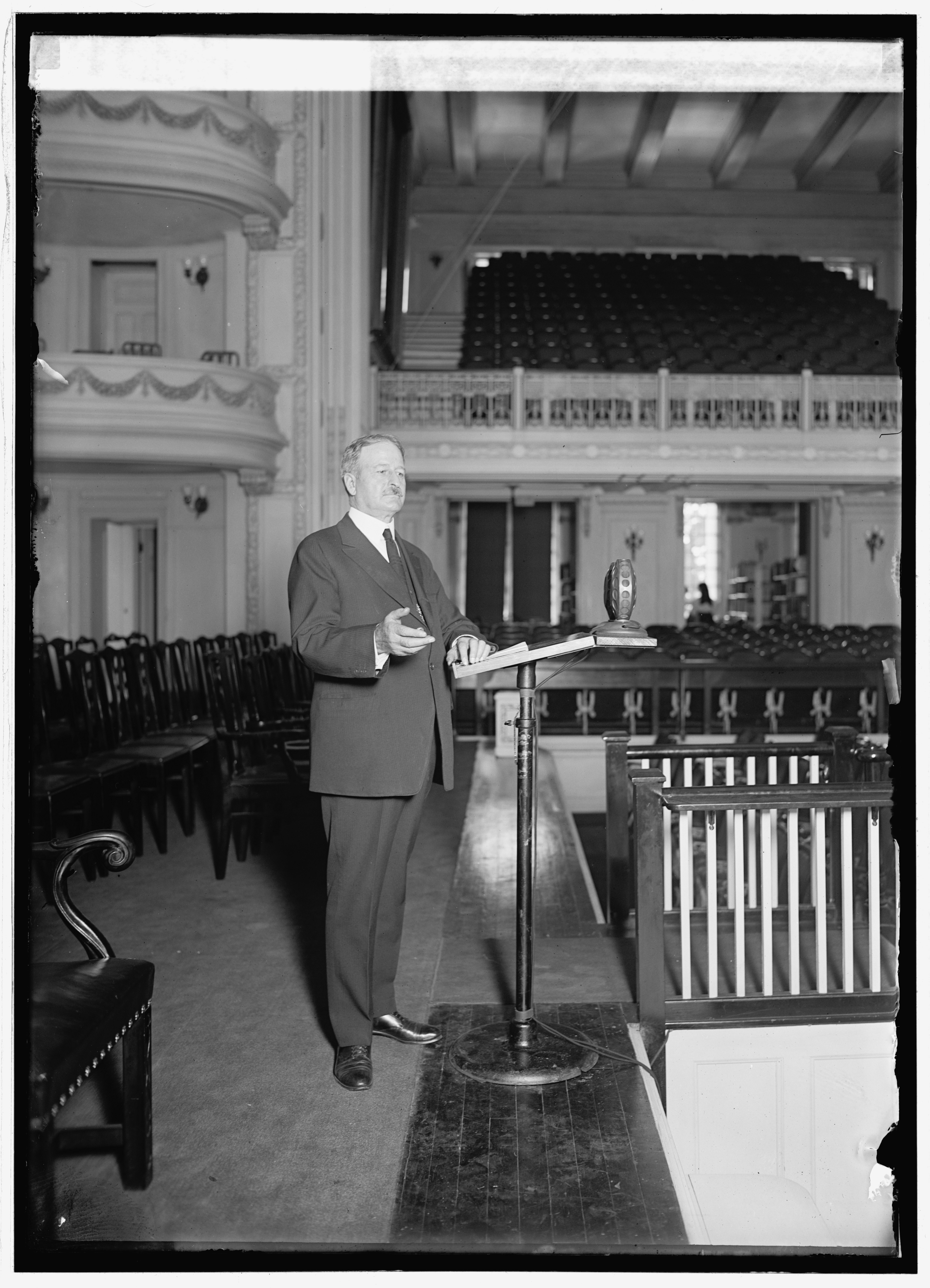
Mondell speaking before the Memorial Continental Hall, 1924

Mondell was a supporter of national forest system by reason of stopping overexploitation. However, he was against the broader conservation movement. He pushed for the Newlands Reclamation Act, a conservation bill, but because it furthered the land rights of individuals and recognized waterbodies as belonging to states. As President Theodore Roosevelt expanded his conservation policy, Mondell became a critic of his administration. In the early 1900s, he wrote a bill proposing that all National forests be transferred to the control from the United States Department of Agriculture, to the United States Forest Service.

As chairman of the Committee on Public Lands and Surveys, Mondell was an early supporter in making Devils Tower the first National monument. It was Mondell's efforts which led to Roosevelt declaring it as such.

Mondell did not assist in the fight against the Teapot Dome scandal, despite it taking place in Wyoming. In his autobiography, he stated that he did not know of it before it became public knowledge. In 1922, he proposed a bill to pay a royalty of 37.5% to the Wyoming government for the Teapot Dome leasing. However, the royalty was lowered to 5% by Senator Kendrick. During his 1922 Senate campaign, Wyoming Republican Party chairman P. C. Spencer suggested to Mondell that he use the scandal to smear Kendrick, as Kendrick had voted for the bill allowing the scandal to happen; Mondell refused.

=== Military and foreign affairs ===
During his tenure, the United States participated in the Spanish–American War and World War I. As a member of the Committee on Military Affairs, Mondell helped shape American military policy. He also influenced military policy as a member of the Committee on Appropriations, which gave him deciding power over the federal budget.

Mondell opposed stationing American troops in foreign countries, with him arguing that Americans being a difference nationality and race would be "galling" to the natives the soldiers would oversee. On the issue of Puerto Rico, he proposed creating a permanent regiment made up, preferably, solely of Puerto Ricans. In 1905, he supporter the building of two new battleships. He opposed the building of two more in 1906, as he believed the United States required no more than 25 warships. On the issue of Naval fueling, he proposed that the United States Navy get its oil from Alaska, as opposed to the Western United States, which includes Wyoming.

Beginning in the early 1910s, Mondell began to oppose naval spending, as he believed European countries would refuse to war with each other in fear of bankrupting themselves over naval defeats. In early 1913, he supported ceasing Naval spending for one year. As World War I began and continued on, he remained opposed. He was a fierce critic of President Woodrow Wilson, namely regarding Wilson's stances on the military. In 1915, he expressed supporting naval expansion while still not pushing it legislatively, and in 1916, supported the building of more submarines. He supported arming merchant ships, voting in favor of a bill requiring such in 1917, though later stated he felt it to be unnecessary. Mondell opposed the Selective Service Act of 1917.

Mondell opposed the militarization of the Panama Canal, for economic reasons. In 1920, he criticized Wilson's military development during World War I, calling it late-coming and mismanaged. He supported paying a bonus to World War I veterans. On February 23, 1920, he proposed consolidating all bill discussions to the Committee on Ways and Means in order to veteran benefit bills at a quicker pace. On May 15, Franklin Knight Lane agreed to expedite the bill. On April 19, he introduced the Mondell Soldier Settlement Bill, which was met with mixed reception among Republican Representatives.

On foreign policy, Mondell supported American expansionism for economic reasons. He pushed for expansion into the Far East, the Middle East, and South America. In 1898, he supported the annexation of the Philippines. In 1912, he opposed allowing for universal passage through the Panama Canal. On April 11, 1914, in a speech given before the American Academy of Political and Social Science, he stated it was the United States' duty to guide Mexican politics by means of the Monroe Doctrine. He also requested that President Wilson recognize the presidency of Victoriano Huerta. Early into World War I, Mondell supported neutrality.

=== Miscellaneous policy and positions ===
Mondell opposed Republican Speaker Joseph Gurney Cannon, calling for his powers stripped from him. He had previously supported Cannon, but felt his power as Speaker had grown too large.

Mondell was an early supporter of women's suffrage in Congress, having come from a state which supported it. In 1904, he introduced the first resolution to give women voting rights.

Mondell supported Prohibition. He voted in favor of the Volstead Act and Eighteenth Amendment to the United States Constitution.

== Later career and personal life ==
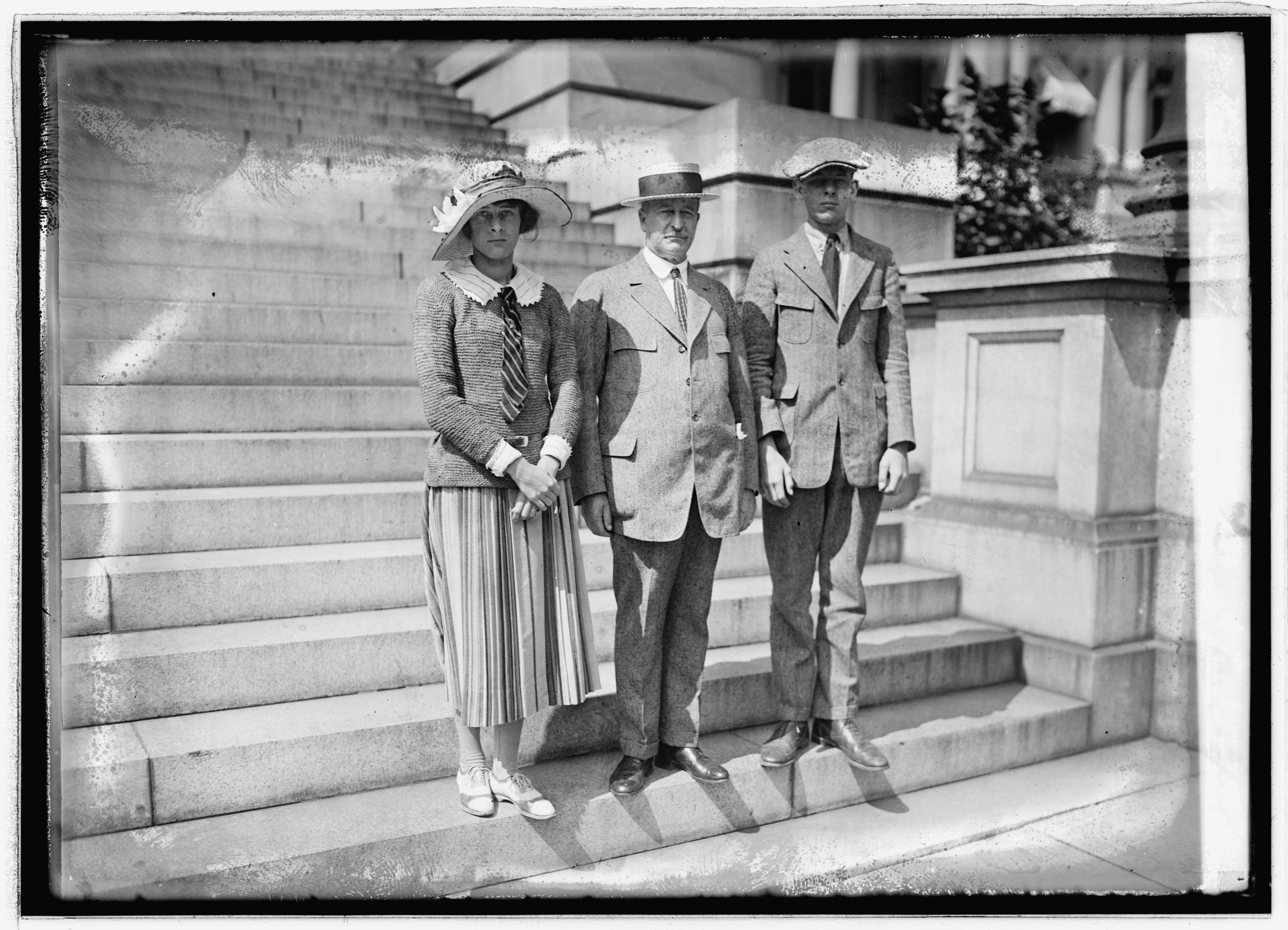
Mondell (center) with his family, 1922

Between his terms in the House, Mondell was appointed assistant commissioner of the United States General Land Office, serving from November 15, 1897, to March 3, 1899. From 1923 until his resignation in July 1925, he was director of the War Finance Corporation. He declined roles as ambassador to Japan and Governor of Puerto Rico from President Warren G. Harding. In 1924, he was considered by President Calvin Coolidge for United States Secretary of the Interior, though was not chosen. He studied at the National University School of Law, though never graduated. In 1924, he was admitted to the Wyoming State Bar, later being permitted to practice in Washington, D.C. He then practiced law in the latter until his death.

On May 13, 1899, Mondell married Ida Harris; had five children together. His daughter, Dorothy, married Alexander White Gregg Jr., the son of politician Alexander W. Gregg. He was a member of the Lions Clubs International, with the club having endorsed him form Congress. He died on August 6, 1939, aged 78, in Washington, D.C., from leukemia, and was buried at Cedar Hill Cemetery, in Suitland, Maryland. An archive of his papers is held by the American Heritage Center, at the University of Wyoming.

== Sources ==
- Wernimont, Donald H. (August 1956). Frank W. Mondell As A Congressman (MA thesis). University of Wyoming (published 1956).

Party political offices
Preceded by Clarence D. Clark	Republican nominee for U.S. Senator from Wyoming (Class 1); 1922	Succeeded by Charles E. Winter
U.S. House of Representatives
Preceded by Henry A. Coffeen	Member of the U.S. House of Representatives from Wyoming's at-large congressional district March 4, 1895 – March 3, 1897	Succeeded by John E. Osborne
Preceded by John E. Osborne	Member of the U.S. House of Representatives from Wyoming's at-large congressional district March 4, 1899 – March 3, 1923	Succeeded by Charles E. Winter
Political offices
Preceded by Claude Kitchin; North Carolina	House Majority Leader; 1919–1923	Succeeded by Nicholas Longworth; Ohio
