= Mining industry of Zimbabwe =

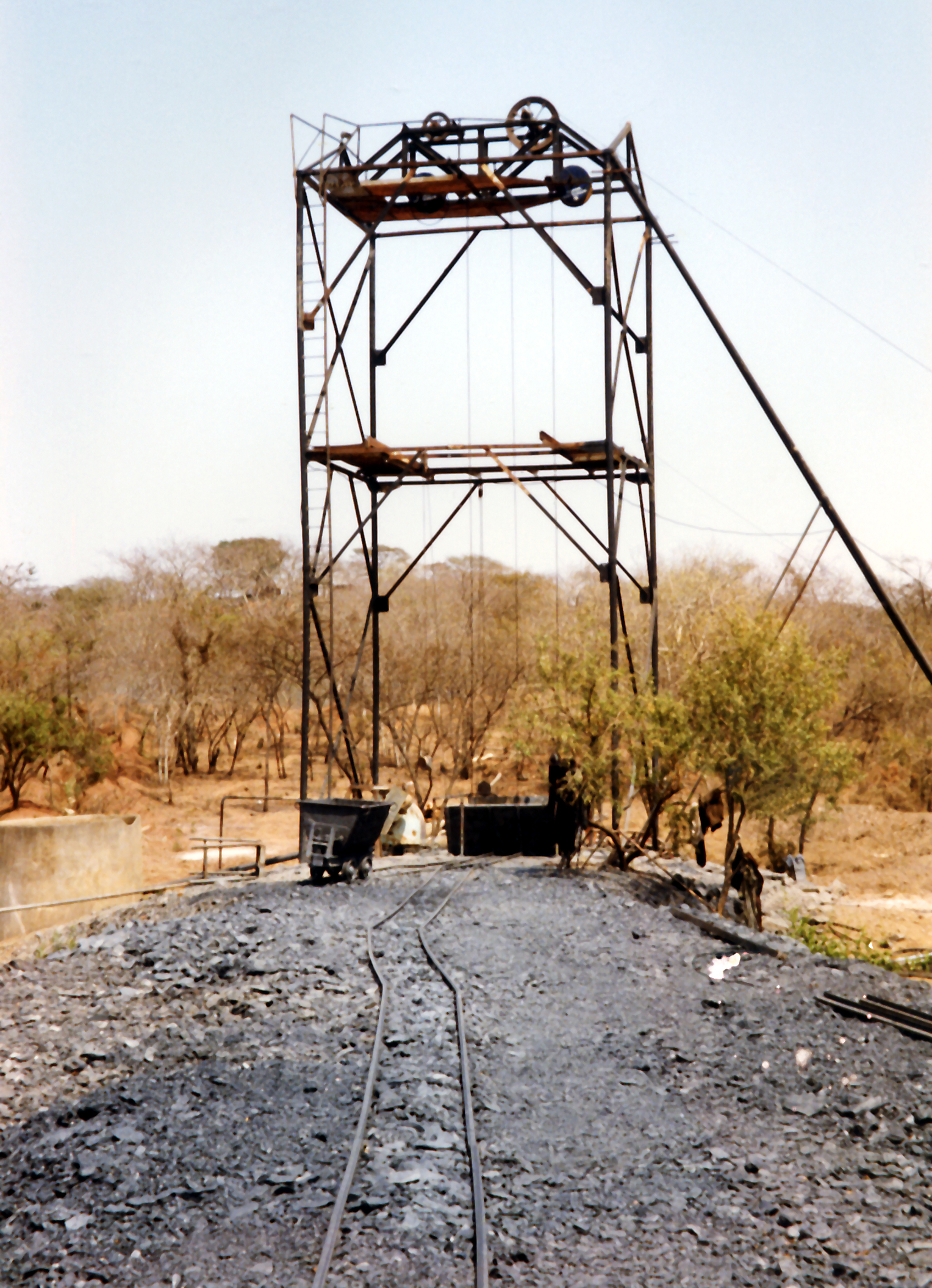
Agincourt Mine, Mberengwa

The mining industry of Zimbabwe is highly diversified, with close to 40 different minerals. The predominant minerals mined by the industry include platinum, chrome, gold, coal, and diamonds. The country boasts the second-largest platinum deposit and high-grade chromium ores in the world, with approximately 2.8 billion tons of platinum group metals and 10 billion tons of chromium ore. Zimbabwe holds the largest reserves of lithium in Africa and ranks fifth globally (estimates vary). The sector accounts for about 12 percent of the country's gross domestic product (GDP).

Early development of the country was spurred by the European discovery of gold, in many cases they found evidence of previous gold mining.

== Social conditions ==
=== Medicine ===
In Zimbabwean mines, Malawian and Mozambican men were seen to possess muthi because many engaged in sexual relationships with other men, often through intercrural sex. Semen released during sex would be used in muthi, because it possessed magic and/or protective charms.

== Gallery ==
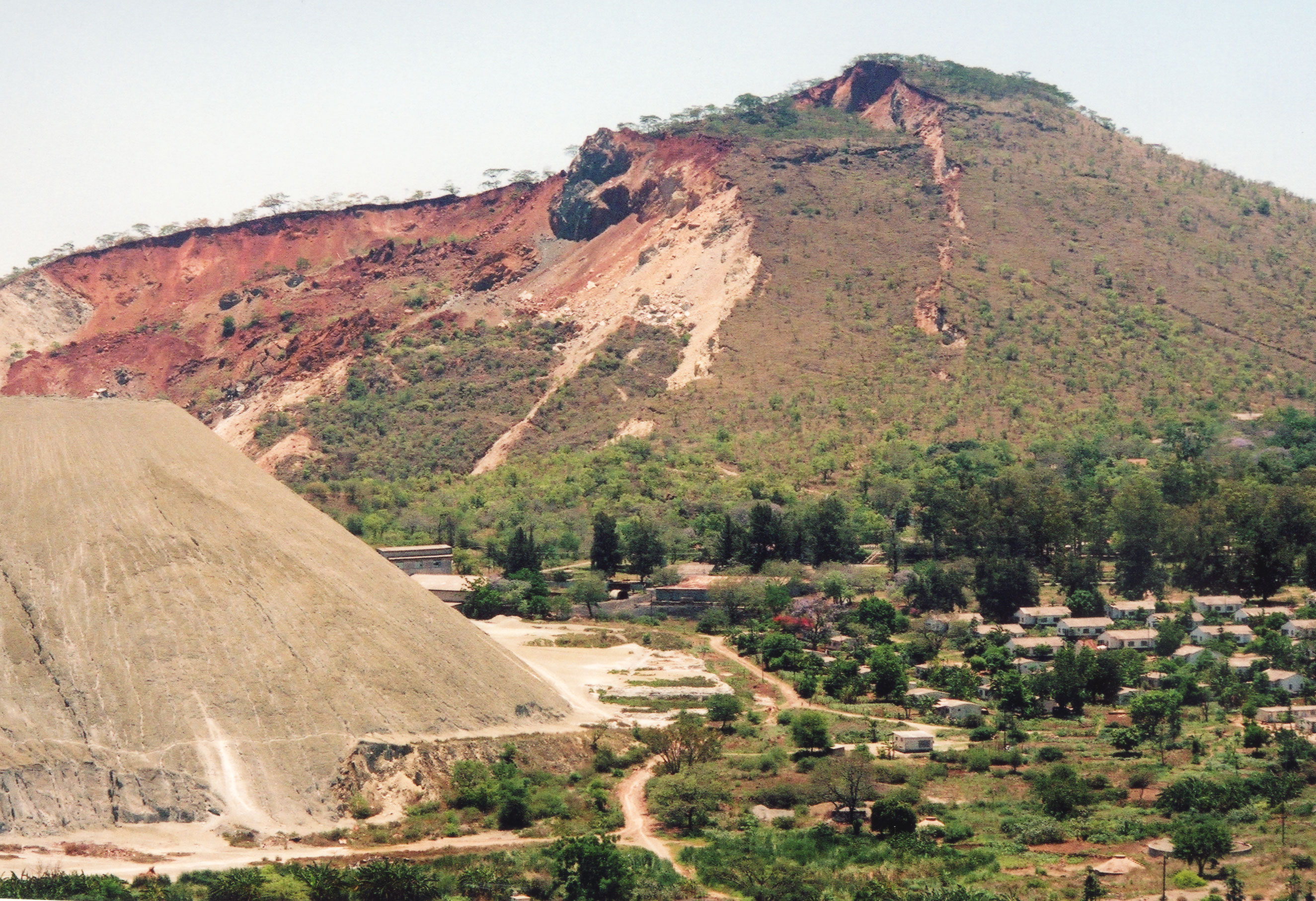
Mashava asbestos mine

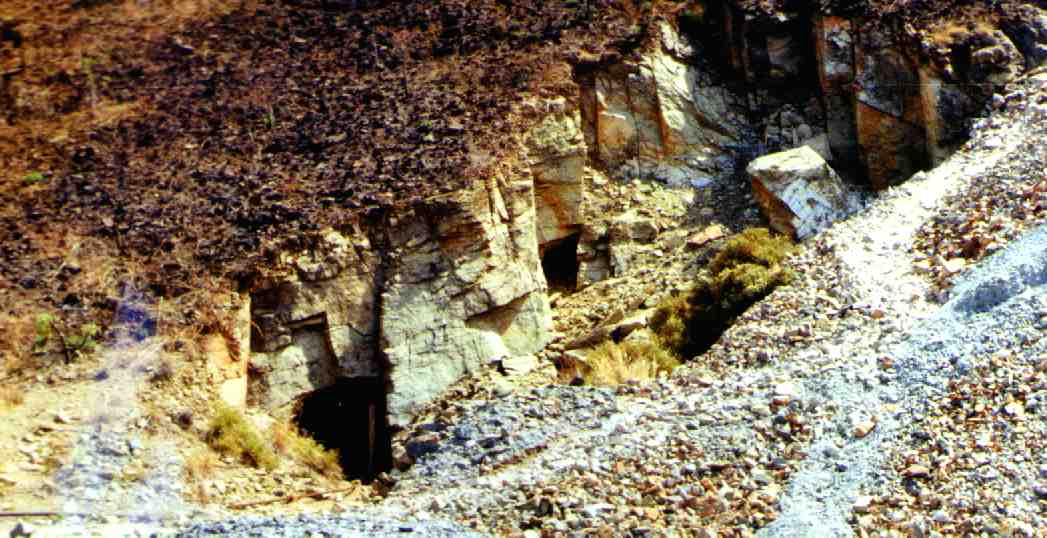
Mutorashanga mine
