= Joseph Battell (disambiguation) =

Joseph Battell (1839–1915) was an American publisher and philanthropist.

Joseph Battell may also refer to:

- Joseph Battell (1774–1841), namesake of Battell Chapel at Yale University, see Gustave J. Stoeckel
- Joseph Battell (1806–1874), his son, funder of Battell Chapel at Yale University, uncle of the wildlands philanthropist
