= Justice Battle =

Justice Battle may refer to:

- Burrill B. Battle (1838–1917), associate justice of the Arkansas Supreme Court
- William Horn Battle(1802–1879), associate justice of the North Carolina Supreme Court
