= Ralph Battell =

English divine

Ralph Battell, D.D. (1649–1713) was an English divine.

Battell was the son of Ralph Battell, M.A., rector of All Saints' and St. John's, Hertford. was born on 11 April 1649, and received his education at Peterhouse, Cambridge (B.A., 1669; M.A., 1673; D.D., comitiis regiis, 1705). He became rector of St. Peter's Church, Canterbury, and of Edworth, Bedfordshire; subdean of the Chapel Royal; sub-almoner to Queen Anne; and prebendary of Worcester (1680).

He died on 20 March 1712–13, and was buried in the cemetery of All Saints', Hertford. There is a mezzotint engraving of him by J. Simon from a painting by Michael Dahl.

== Works ==
- Vulgar Errors in Divinity removed, London, 1683, 8vo. William Haworth, in his Absolute Election of Persons, not upon foreseen conditions, stated and maintained (London, 1694, 4to), criticised the ‘Pelagian errors' contained in this book.
- A Sermon on Matt. vii. 12, 1684, 4to.
- The Lawfulness and Expediency of Church-Musick asserted, in a sermon on Ps. c. 1, 2, London, 1694, 4to.
