= Mike Battle (artist) =

American restoration artist (born 1978)

Mike Battle (born September 16, 1978, in Rochester, New York) is an American digital restoration artist and animation color modelist. He is best known for his work on The Simpsons. He currently works and resides in Los Angeles, CA.

== Education ==
He attended Rochester Institute of Technology School of Film and Animation, graduating in 2002.

== Career ==
In 2003, Battle got his start working in animation as a post-production coordinator on the 8th Season of King of the Hill. Two years later, he was hired as a production coordinator for The Simpsons and The Simpsons Movie. At the start of the nineteenth season, he began working as animation color modelist. That same year, he animated the LEGO couch gag for "Midnight Towboy" (episode# JABF21), in which the family is built out of LEGO bricks, in a LEGO living room. It first aired on October 7, 2007.

== Conservation/Restoration work ==
In 2008, Battle started collecting vintage postcard images of his Rochester, New York hometown. A year later, he established "FlourCityPost.com," a website featuring his digital restoration work. The website currently showcases 150 restored views of the 1,500+ images that he owns.
