= Battle Creek (Butte County, South Dakota) =

Stream in South Dakota, United States

Coordinates: 45°06′28″N 103°27′35″W

Battle Creek is a stream in the U.S. state of South Dakota.

Battle Creek was named for a skirmish between two Indian tribes.

== See also ==
- List of rivers of South Dakota
