= Ebenezer Battelle =

American bookseller

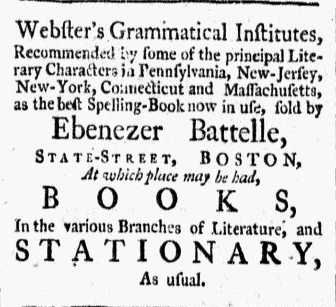
Advertisement for Noah Webster's Grammatical Institutes, for sale by Ebenezer Battelle, bookseller, State Street, Boston, 1784

Ebenezer Battelle (1754–1815) was an American Revolutionary War veteran, a bookseller in Boston, Massachusetts, and a settler of Marietta, Ohio, in the late 18th century.

== Life in Dedham ==
Battelle was born in 1754 in Dedham, Massachusetts, to Ebenezer Battle (d.1776) and Prudence Draper. He attended Harvard College (class of 1775); schoolmates included Fisher Ames and Benjamin Bourne. He was a member of the Sons of Liberty and the Free Brothers in Dedham.

He was also town clerk for a total of two years, having first been elected in 1778, and selectman for two terms, with his first election the same year.

He was one of three, along with Nathaniel Ames and Abijah Draper who erected the Pillar of Liberty in Dedham in 1766 to commemorate the repeal of the Stamp Act.

== Military ==
He "was a volunteer at the battle of Lexington. ... [In 1776, he] served nineteen days at Castle Island, Dec. 11 to Dec. 30, 1776; went on the expedition to Providence, R.I., May 8 to July 8, 1777; re-enlisted, and served from March 23 to April 5, 1778, and was commissioned captain of the Eighth Company in the Suffolk Regiment, July 2, 1778. He was promoted to be major, April 1, 1780, and became colonel of the Boston regiment in 1784." He joined the Ancient and Honorable Artillery Company of Massachusetts in 1786.

== Bookseller ==
After the war Battelle sold and published books from his shop in Boston on State Street (ca.1783-1785) and Marlboro Street (1785-ca.1787). In addition to books imported from London, he stocked American publications such as Isaiah Thomas' Almanack and Noah Webster's Grammatical Institutes.

== Personal life ==
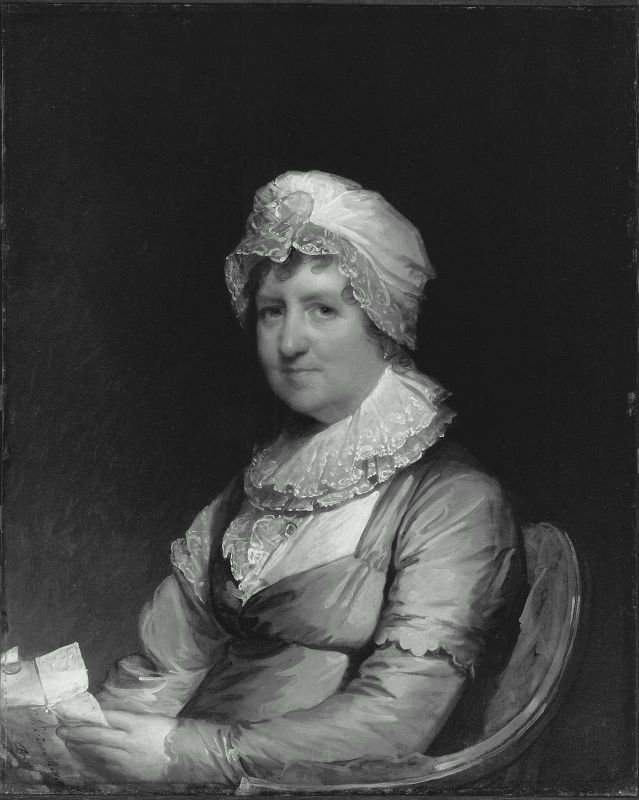
Portrait of Anna Durant, wife of Ebenezer Battelle; by Gilbert Stuart, 1810 (Museum of Fine Arts, Boston)

Battelle married Anna Durant; children included Ebenezer Battelle (b.1778) and Thomas Battelle (b.1781). Battelle and his family settled in Marietta, Ohio, around 1789.

On July 26, 1783, Henry Belcher of Boston wrote to Battelle asking to be paid $8 ($257.74 in 2025) for a beaver skin hat that Belcher sold to Battelle but for which he had not yet received payment.

== See also ==
- List of booksellers in Boston

== Works cited ==
- Worthington, Erastus (1827). The history of Dedham: from the beginning of its settlement, in September 1635, to May 1827. Dutton and Wentworth.
- Hanson, Robert Brand (1976). Dedham, Massachusetts, 1635-1890. Dedham Historical Society.
- Clarke, Wm. Horatio (1903). Mid-Century Memories of Dedham. Dedham Historical Society.
