= Annie Maude Norton Battelle =

American suffragette and philanthropist

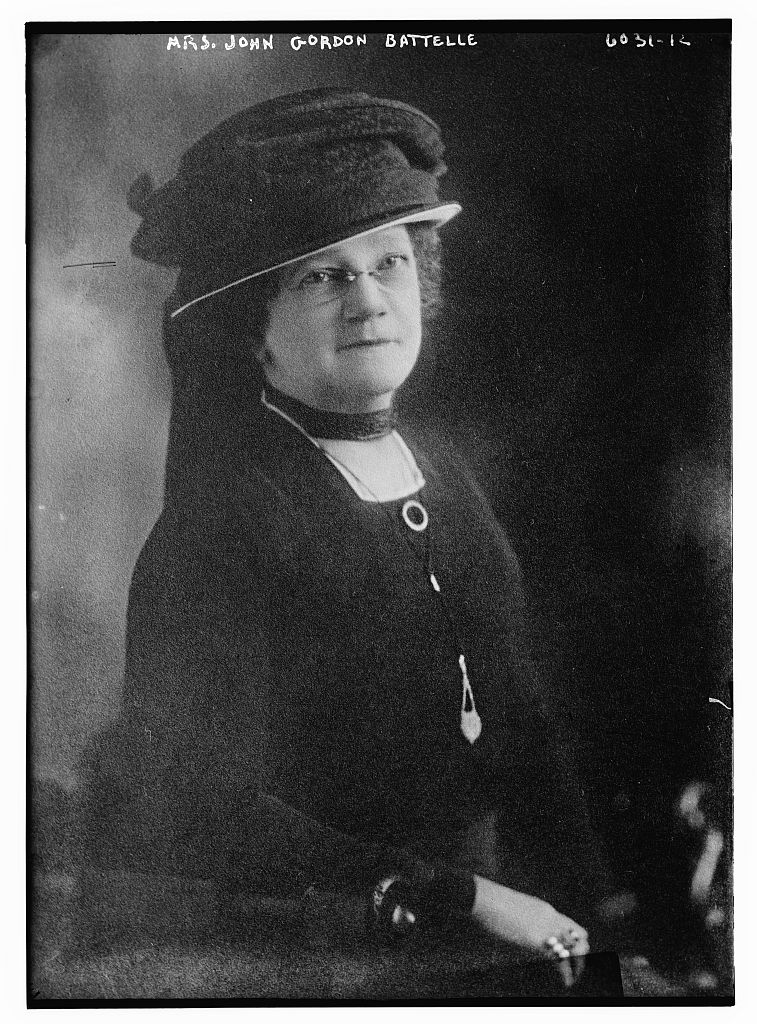
- Battelle in 1920
- Born: January 26, 1865; Birmingham, Alabama
- Died: March 23, 1925 (aged 60); Washington D.C.

Annie Maude Norton Battelle (January 26, 1865 – March 23, 1925) was a suffragette and philanthropist.

Battelle, a Republican, became very active politically after the death of her husband in 1918. She was at protester at the Republican National Convention in 1920 to lobby for endorsement of women’s suffrage before a presidential nomination was made.

She was president of the Women's Republican Club of Ohio as well as a delegate at large to the Republican National Convention of 1924. She was also an Honorary founding member of The Junior League of Columbus, established in 1923. The Battelles had been friends with Warren and Florence Harding and Battelle headed up the women's bureau at Harding's election headquarters. Battelle served on the Annual Assay Commission for 1923, appointed by President Harding.

She helped establish Battelle Memorial Institute, leaving her fortune of about $2 million (equivalent to $35.86 million in 2024) to the organization when she died. She was the first female trustee of the Columbus Metropolitan Library.

Battelle was born Annie Maude Norton in Birmingham, Alabama, to Samuel Edwin Norton and Julia Justina Alston Norton. She married Colonel John Gordon Battelle, a steel magnate in Memphis, Tennessee, in 1881. They moved to Cincinnati and Piqua before settling in Columbus, Ohio in 1905. They had one son Gordon Battelle, who died in 1923. Battelle died of heart disease in Washington, D.C., on March 23, 1925.
