= Battle, Wyoming =

- Unincorporated community
- Location within the state of Wyoming Battle (the United States)
- Coordinates: 41°9′21″N 106°58′56″W
- Country: United States
- State: Wyoming
- County: Carbon
- Elevation: 9,924 ft (3,025 m)
- Time zone: UTC-7 (Mountain (MST))
  - Summer (DST): UTC-6 (MST)
- GNIS feature ID: 1597963

Battle was an unincorporated community and coal town located in Carbon County, Wyoming, United States. The Battle community and Old Battle mining site are located around the summit of Battle Pass, at an elevation of 9,924 ft (3,025 m).

The town of Battle was founded in 1898, one of the old towns in the Encampment district of Carbon County. The town had a wagon road that ran between the Ferris-Haggarty mine and the town of Encampment. A town post office ran from 1898 to 1905. The town of Battle was a resting stop on the wagon road. In 1902 a 16 mile tramway was completed, which bypassed the town. By 1905 the town became a ghost town.

== Climate ==
There is a SNOTEL weather station for Old Battle situated at an altitude of 10,000 ft (3,048 m). Old Battle has a subalpine climate (Köppen Dfc).

Climate data for Old Battle, Wyoming, 1991–2020 normals, 1986-2020 extremes: 10000ft (3048m)
Month	Jan	Feb	Mar	Apr	May	Jun	Jul	Aug	Sep	Oct	Nov	Dec	Year
Record high °F (°C)	45 (7)	45 (7)	56 (13)	64 (18)	73 (23)	79 (26)	83 (28)	80 (27)	76 (24)	66 (19)	66 (19)	43 (6)	83 (28)
Mean maximum °F (°C)	33.5 (0.8)	36.8 (2.7)	47.8 (8.8)	57.4 (14.1)	64.2 (17.9)	71.7 (22.1)	76.6 (24.8)	74.4 (23.6)	69.3 (20.7)	57.8 (14.3)	44.1 (6.7)	33.9 (1.1)	77.2 (25.1)
Mean daily maximum °F (°C)	21.3 (−5.9)	23.7 (−4.6)	32.7 (0.4)	40.8 (4.9)	50.3 (10.2)	60.8 (16.0)	68.2 (20.1)	66.1 (18.9)	56.6 (13.7)	42.0 (5.6)	28.8 (−1.8)	20.7 (−6.3)	42.7 (5.9)
Daily mean °F (°C)	15.9 (−8.9)	17.3 (−8.2)	24.5 (−4.2)	31.1 (−0.5)	40.2 (4.6)	50.0 (10.0)	57.5 (14.2)	56.1 (13.4)	47.5 (8.6)	34.8 (1.6)	23.1 (−4.9)	15.5 (−9.2)	34.5 (1.4)
Mean daily minimum °F (°C)	10.5 (−11.9)	10.8 (−11.8)	16.3 (−8.7)	21.4 (−5.9)	30.2 (−1.0)	39.2 (4.0)	46.8 (8.2)	46.0 (7.8)	38.4 (3.6)	27.6 (−2.4)	17.4 (−8.1)	10.3 (−12.1)	26.2 (−3.2)
Mean minimum °F (°C)	−6.9 (−21.6)	−6.1 (−21.2)	−0.2 (−17.9)	6.5 (−14.2)	16.1 (−8.8)	27.8 (−2.3)	37.9 (3.3)	37.3 (2.9)	23.5 (−4.7)	9.3 (−12.6)	−1.5 (−18.6)	−8.1 (−22.3)	−12.7 (−24.8)
Record low °F (°C)	−21 (−29)	−38 (−39)	−18 (−28)	−11 (−24)	6 (−14)	16 (−9)	27 (−3)	25 (−4)	9 (−13)	−10 (−23)	−18 (−28)	−36 (−38)	−38 (−39)
Average precipitation inches (mm)	6.19 (157)	5.55 (141)	5.25 (133)	5.74 (146)	4.32 (110)	1.91 (49)	1.28 (33)	1.35 (34)	2.57 (65)	3.92 (100)	5.08 (129)	6.30 (160)	49.46 (1,257)
Source 1: XMACIS2
Source 2: NOAA (Precipitation)
