= Gordon Battelle =

American metallurgist (1883–1923)

Gordon Battelle (10 August 1883 – 21 September 1923) was the founder of Battelle Memorial Institute, a non-profit independent research and development organization.

== Birth, death and family ==
Gordon Battelle was born in Covington, Kentucky, to Ohio industrialist Colonel John Gordon Battelle (1845–1918) and his wife Annie Maude Battelle née Norton (1865–1925). He was named for his grandfather, prominent Methodist minister Gordon Battelle, who had helped found the state of West Virginia before dying of disease as a chaplain in the American Civil War. John Gordon Battelle had become a pioneer in the steel industry as owner of Columbus Iron & Steel Company. His wife, Annie Maude Norton Battelle, was a suffragette. They married in Memphis, Tennessee in 1881, where John Gordon Battelle had moved from Wheeling, West Virginia to establish an iron manufacturing company. The family moved to the Cincinnati, Ohio metropolitan area (which includes Covington) as John Gordon Battelle established the Piqua Rolling Mill Company and the Cincinnati Corrugating Company. In 1905, the family moved to Columbus, Ohio, where John Gordon Battelle died in 1918. Annie Maude Norton Battelle died in March 1925 (outliving her son Gordon by two years).

== Education ==
As the only son of John and Annie Battelle, Gordon was trained to inherit and manage his father's holdings in the steel industry. He attended military school in Chester, Pennsylvania, and later studied metallurgy at the Sheffield Scientific School of Yale University.

== Career ==
After working for his father for several years, young Gordon Battelle struck out on his own and invested in lead mining and smelting operations near Joplin, Missouri.

While there, he became acquainted with a scientist and former professor, George Waring, who was trying to develop a process to recover saleable minerals from mine tailings and mine water. Battelle became interested in the experimental work and built a small laboratory for Waring. This resulted in the successful completion of the process, which was then taken to a commercial laboratory for economic appraisal.

== Death and legacy ==
In 1923, at age 40, Gordon Battelle died following appendectomy surgery at a Columbus, Ohio hospital. He was buried in his father's mausoleum at Green Lawn Cemetery in Columbus, Ohio.

Battelle willed the bulk of his estate, about $1.6 million (equivalent to $34.25 million in 2025), to establish the Battelle Memorial Institute. He had developed a strong sense of social responsibility from his parents and hearing about his grandfather. His father led many charitable endeavors in the community. His mother devoted many hours to church, charitable work and benevolent political movements, and had become one of the largest donors to private charities in Columbus.

Gordon Battelle believed that the way to achieve lasting impact and benefit from his wealth was to use it in a way that would benefit mankind through science. He regarded scientific research as not only a means of making industry more efficient, but also of solving social problems and uplifting the common man. Thus, he established the institute "for the purpose of education in connection with and the encouragement of creative and research work and the making of discoveries and inventions in connection with the metallurgy of coal, iron, steel, zinc and their allied industries." Battelle Memorial Institute opened its doors on King Avenue in Columbus, Ohio, in October 1929.

== Battelle Memorial Institute today ==
Battelle Memorial Institute has its headquarters in Columbus, Ohio. It supports and promotes science and math education, and conducts research and development through contract research, laboratory management, and technology commercialization. Every year, Battelle Memorial Institute donates 20 percent of its net income to the communities in which it works.

The Institute conducts research in areas such as global climate change, sustainable energy technologies, high performance materials, next generation healthcare diagnostics and therapeutics, and advanced security products and services for people, infrastructure, and the nation. The Institute has also helped develop commercial products ranging from products to fight diabetes, cancer, and heart disease to the office copier machine (Xerox).
