= Battlefield (Manipuri film) =

Battlefield is a 2025 Indian Meitei language feature-length, documentary film. It tells stories of the history and myths of World War II happened in Manipur. It shows the incidents of 1944 Battle of Imphal between the Allied Forces and Japan. It is directed by Borun Thokchom. It was produced by Manjoy Lourembam and co-produced by Radheshyam Oinam, of Network Services Imphal, and Vishwamitra Universals. It is 80 minutes in duration.

According to director Borun Thokchom, the filming took more than ten years. In "The Hindu" report, it is said to be thirteen years.

== Cast ==
Rajeshwor Singh was the main character (protagonist) of the film. He was shown doing deep research and fieldwork, making the backbone of the documentary. He took the role of helping the audiences through important locations, archival remnants, and stories related to the Battle of Imphal.

The film also casts renowned writer Late Khuraijam Nimaicharan Singh.

== Making ==
The film was begun to be made in Imphal Documentor, a 2022 project development lab, functioning for five days, developed by the collaboration between the Manipur State Film Development Society (MSFDS), the Documentary Resource Initiative (DRI), Kolkata, and the Television Cine Foundation Manipur.

== World premiere ==
The film had its world premiere on November 22, 2025, at 9:30 a.m. at INOX – Audi II, Old GMC Building, Campal, Panjim.

== International receptions ==
The film was selected for the Indian Panorama section of the 56th International Film Festival of India (IFFI) 2025, that took place in Goa.

The film was shown at the 19th edition of the International Film Festival of India (IFFI), also known as Mumbai International Film Festival (MIFF), on June 20, 2026, which was the oldest and largest celebration of cinema in South Asia. It was considered as one of the two "non-feature" films, that had "drawn attention" in the event, with the other one, being a Marathi language film "Hamsafar", as per the reports of the Press Information Bureau (PIB) of the Government of India.

== Legacy ==
The film Battlefield, along with another Manipuri film Oitharei, simultaneously held the legacy of breaking a year's hiatus (gap) of Manipuri film industry, being absent from annually participating in the International Film Festival of India (IFFI) list. It was announced by the Manipur State Film Development Society (MSFDS) as a "triumphant comeback".

== See also ==
- My Japanese Niece
- Imphal 1944
- Imphal Peace Museum
