= Patrice Wymore =

American actress (1926–2014)

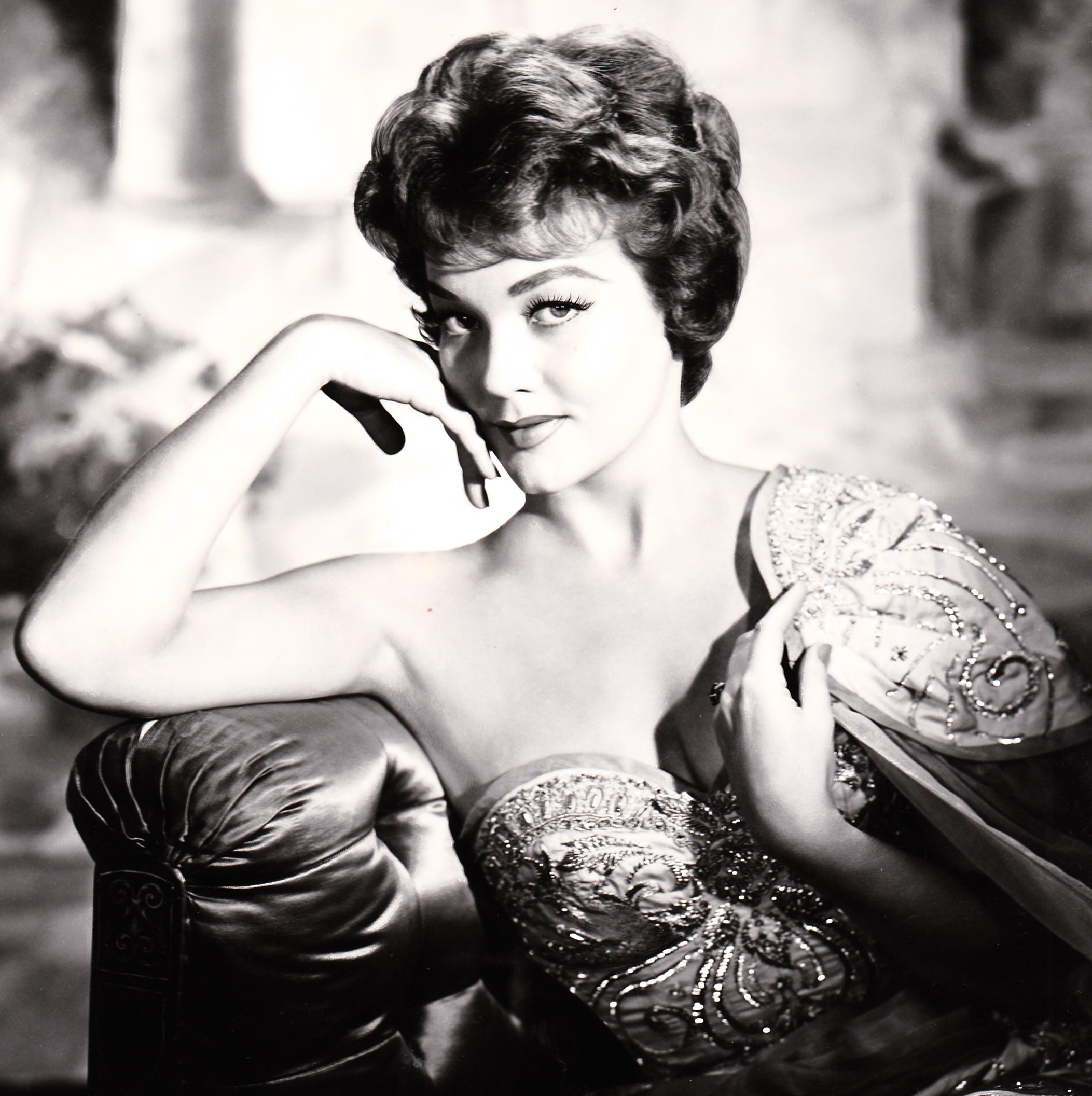
- Wymore in the 1950s
- Born: Patricia Wymore; December 17, 1926; Miltonvale, Kansas, U.S.
- Died: March 22, 2014 (aged 87); Portland Parish, Jamaica
- Other names: Patrice Wymore Flynn; Trice Wymore
- Occupations: Actress, singer
- Years active: 1947–1967
- Spouse: Errol Flynn (m. 1950; died 1959)
- Children: 1

Patrice Wymore Flynn (born Patricia Wymore; December 17, 1926 – March 22, 2014) was an American film, television and stage actress of the 1950s and 1960s, known for her marriage to Errol Flynn.

== Early life ==
Born Patricia Wymore in Miltonvale, Kansas, to a family of vaudeville performers; her parents were Mr. and Mrs. J. A. Wymore. She began touring with them at the age of six. in 1945 she was Homecoming Queen at Kemper Military School. Following that selection she was booked for a week's engagement as a dancer at the Tower Theatre in Kansas City, Missouri in December 1945.

== Career ==
=== Stage beginnings ===
By the time she reached adulthood, she was an accomplished dancer with a good singing voice. She auditioned in New York City for a part in Up in Central Park, in which she performed in 1947.

Still "Patricia Wymore," she then starred, fourth billed, with Johnny Downs, Red Buttons, and Jet McDonald in the 1948 Broadway musical Hold It!, for which she won a Theatre World Award for "Promising Actress". This was followed by a five-month stint in the revue All for Love in 1949, where she was discovered by a talent scout from Warner Bros. who signed her up.

=== Film ===
Her first film appearance under the name "Patrice Wymore" was in the 1950 film Tea for Two, opposite Doris Day and Gordon MacRae, where she made an impression with the Latin-flavoured rendition of "Crazy Rhythm". That same year she starred in Rocky Mountain opposite Hollywood legend Errol Flynn, with whom she would become romantically involved. Flynn and Wymore were traveling and living in Europe, mainly in Mallorca aboard Zaca, Flynn's yacht. At the age of 23, she married the 41-year-old actor in a civil ceremony in Monte Carlo, Monaco, on October 23, 1950, followed by a religious service at the Lutheran Church, Nice, France. Wymore continued to act to fulfill her contract with Warner, appearing in several films over the next few years, including the musical I'll See You in My Dreams (1951), her second film alongside Doris Day. She also guest-starred as herself in the 1951 musical film Starlift, performing the song "Liza (All the Clouds'll Roll Away)." It was followed by a role as saloon singer in the Kirk Douglas feature The Big Trees (1952) and a part in the musical comedy She's Working Her Way Through College, starring Virginia Mayo, in the same year. In 1953, she appeared alongside Mayo in the musical dramedy She's Back on Broadway, and that same year she starred opposite Randolph Scott in The Man Behind the Gun. She was then released by Warners.

She temporarily retired from Hollywood after giving birth to her daughter, Arnella Roma Flynn, born December 25, 1953. The daughter would later become a fashion model in Europe. In 1955 Wymore appeared with her husband Errol Flynn and Anna Neagle in the film version of King's Rhapsody. Although only in his forties, Flynn was already in a physical and mental decline by the time they married. Wymore took a break from acting to care for her now ailing husband, and to better raise their daughter, while settling on their estate in Jamaica. However, due to Flynn's alcohol and drug addictions, the couple separated. They never divorced, however, and were still married at the time of his death on October 14, 1959.

In 1958 Wymore sang and danced in a night club act, performing at venues in Hollywood, Las Vegas, and Phoenix. During that time she was working on the film The Sad Horse and making plans for a national club tour in 1959. In addition to her work in the United States, she was "a favorite entertainer in some of Europe's most glamorous supper clubs".

=== Later performances ===
Following Flynn's death, Wymore returned to acting, mostly in summer stock musicals such as Carnival!, Guys and Dolls, Irma La Douce, and Gentlemen Prefer Blondes. She made a memorable appearance as Adele Elkstrom, Frank Sinatra's character's girlfriend, in the hit film Ocean's 11 in 1960. In 1960 she told syndicated newspaper columnist Sheilah Graham, "I need to work, emotionally and financially. When I went off to be a housewife, I was doing well in my profession. I came back thinking the same doors would be open. Not at all. I had to start from the bottom again."

She made three guest appearances on Perry Mason. In 1963 she appeared twice: as Maureen Norland in "The Case of the Libelous Locket," and as Jane Alder in "The Case of the Badgered Brother." In 1965 she played murder victim and title character Victoria Dawn in "The Case of the Murderous Mermaid." That year she was also cast in the short-lived soap opera Never Too Young, and in 1966 she appeared in the film Chamber of Horrors. Her last appearance was on the television series F Troop in 1967, after which she retired.

== Personal life ==
Wymore's late husband Errol Flynn had left her a 2,000-acre (8.1 km^{2}) coconut plantation near Castle, in the parish of Portland, Jamaica, as well as a mansion and a cattle ranch. After her retirement she returned to Jamaica, where she opened a boutique and wicker furniture manufacturing business. She continued to be active in Flynn's estate, and often appeared at dedications in his honor up to the time of her death. Her grandson Luke noted 'she was as passionate about her farm as much as the movies'.

Wymore's daughter Arnella was found dead of an apparent drug overdose on September 21, 1998. After suffering with a pulmonary disease for a year, Wymore, aged 87, died of natural causes in Portland, Jamaica, on March 22, 2014. She is survived by her grandson Luke Flynn, who remembered her as 'a tough, resilient and elegant woman'.

== Filmography ==
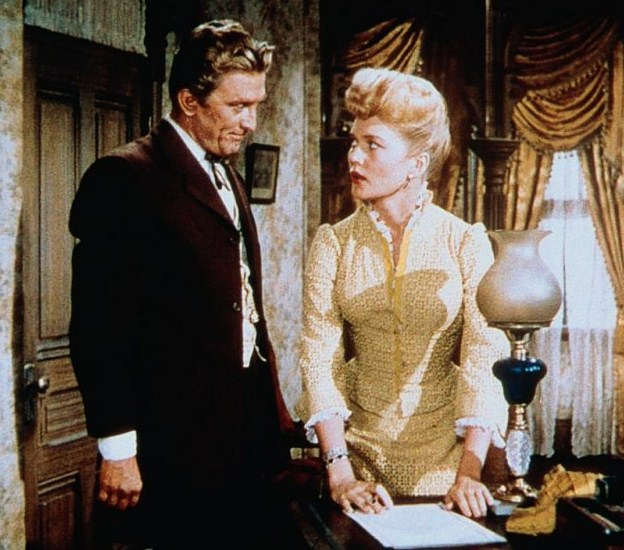
Wymore with Kirk Douglas in The Big Trees

Film
Year	Title	Role	Notes
1950	Tea for Two	Beatrice Darcy	Credited as Pat Wymore
1950	Rocky Mountain	Johanna Carter	
1951	I'll See You in My Dreams	Gloria Knight	
1951	Starlift	Herself	Credited as Pat Wymore
1952	The Big Trees	Daisy Fisher / Dora Figg	
1952	She's Working Her Way Through College	'Poison' Ivy Williams	
1953	The Man Behind the Gun	Lora Roberts	
1953	She's Back on Broadway	Karen Keene	
1955	King's Rhapsody	Princess Cristiane	
1959	The Sad Horse	Leslie MacDonald	
1960	Ocean's 11	Adele Ekstrom	
1966	Chamber of Horrors	Vivian	
Television
Year	Title	Role	Notes
1953	Lux Video Theatre		1 episode
1957	The Errol Flynn Theatre	Various	5 episodes
1958	Jefferson Drum	Goldie	1 episode
1960	The Roaring 20's	Maxine "Bunny" Mallory	1 episode
1960	The Deputy	Lucy Ballance	1 episode
1961	Cheyenne	Harriet Miller	1 episode
1961	Tales of Wells Fargo	Pearl Harvey	1 episode
1961	77 Sunset Strip	Barbara Wentworth	1 episode
1963–1965	Perry Mason	Various	3 episodes
1965	Never Too Young	Rhoda	Unknown episodes
1965–1967	F Troop	Various	2 episodes
1966	Mister Roberts		1 episode
1967	The Monkees	Madame Quagmeyer	S1:E24, "Monkees a la Mode"
