= John F. Storr =

American oceanographer (1916–1993)

Dr. John Frederick (Jack) Storr (1915–1993) was a Canadian marine biologist, oceanographer and limnologist. He taught at the University of Miami and, from 1959 until his retirement, at the University of Buffalo. Storr carried out extensive research in Florida, the Bahamas, as well as research in the Finger Lakes in New York and in the Gulf of Mexico. He was an avid proponent of underwater photography and produced a television series called "Survival in the Sea" from his footage, which aired on stations across the United States.

== Early life ==
Storr was born in Ontario, Canada on 15 August 1915. He obtained a bachelor of arts degree from Queen's University in Kingston in 1942 followed by a masters of arts in physiology from Columbia University in New York in 1947 and a Ph.D in marine ecology and oceanography from Cornell University in 1955.

== Career ==
Storr was an assistant professor at the University of Miami for 3 years. He researched reef zonation in the Bahamas. He also carried out a study of sponge ecology for the US Fish and Wildlife Service. He was also the director of the Adelphi College Bahamian Biological Expedition.

In Florida and the Bahamas, he pursued underwater photography and videography. Between 1957 and 1959, Storr amassed 3,500-4000 hours of underwater footage in the Bahamas. He turned the footage into a 12 part television series called "Survival in the Sea" that aired across the country, and was still being aired in 1966. The show was made for the National Education and Television Center.

Storr also presented an episode of Bold Journey called "Coral Reef".

In 1959, Storr was appointed an assistant professor of biology at the State University of New York at Buffalo (also known as the University of Buffalo). In 1968, he was hired by Rochester Gas and Electric to carry out ecological tests on Lake Ontario potentially affected by the Ginna Power Plant.

== Death ==
Storr died in Hope Town, Abaco, Bahamas on 18 August 1993. He was 78. He was survived by his wife Rhoda, whom he had married in 1942, and one son.

== Publications ==
- Storr, John F., Patricia J. Hadden-Carter, Julian M. Myers, and A. Garry Smythe. "Dispersion of Rock Bass along the South Shore of Lake Ontario." Transactions of the American Fisheries Society 112, no. 5 (1983): 618–28.
- Storr, John F., Alexander L. Costa, and David A. Prawel. "Effects of Temperature on Calcium Deposition in the Hard-Shell Clam, Mercenaria Mercenaria." Journal of Thermal Biology 7, no. 1 (1982): 57–61.
- Storr, John F. "Tagging Yellow Perch in Lake Ontario." Underwater Naturalist 11, no. 1 (1978): 8.
- Storr JF. Ecological factors controlling sponge distribution in the Gulf of Mexico and the resulting zonation. In: Harrison FW, ed. Aspects of sponge biology. New York, NY: Academic Press; 1976. pp. 261–276.
- Storr JF. Ecology and Oceanography of the Coral-Reef Tract, Abaco Island, Bahamas. Geological Society of America. Boulder, Colorado. 1964. Library of Congress catalog no. 64-66221.
- Storr JF. Ecology of the Gulf of Mexico Commercial Sponges and its Relation to the Fishery. Washington, DC: U.S. Department of the Interior, Fish and Wildlife Service; 1964. Special Scientific Report—Fisheries no. 466.
- Storr, John F. "Delta structures in the New York Finger Lakes and their relation to the effects of currents on sediment distribution and aquatic organisms." Proceedings 1962 Conference on Great Lakes Research. International Association for Great Lakes Research. pp. 129–138
- Gans C, Storr JF. Comparative anatomy atlas. New York, NY: Academic Press; 1962. Library of Congress catalog no. 62-18532.
- Storr JF. The Sponge Industry of Florida. Marine Laboratory, University of Miami; 1957.
