= She's Back on Broadway =

1953 film by Gordon Douglas

- Directed by: Gordon Douglas
- Written by: Orin Jannings
- Produced by: Henry Blanke
- Starring: Virginia Mayo; Gene Nelson; Frank Lovejoy; Steve Cochran; Patrice Wymore; Virginia Gibson
- Cinematography: Edwin B. DuPar
- Edited by: Folmar Blangsted
- Music by: David Buttolph
- Production company: Warner Bros. Pictures
- Distributed by: Warner Bros. Pictures
- Release date: March 14, 1953
- Running time: 95 minutes
- Country: United States
- Language: English
- Box office: $1.9 million (US)

She's Back on Broadway is a 1953 musical comedy-drama Warnercolor film starring Virginia Mayo in her final musical film, although her singing voice was dubbed by Bonnie Lou Williams. The film was Mayo's unofficial successor to her 1952 musical hit She's Working Her Way Through College.

== Plot ==
When Catherine Terris' career in Hollywood begins to falter, she returns to Broadway, where her first great triumphs occurred. She takes the lead in a play directed by Rick Sommers, with whom she had a romantic past. Sommers is still bitter that she left him to become the toast of Hollywood years earlier. They try to overcome their mutual animosity to make the play a success.

== Cast ==
- Virginia Mayo as Catherine Terris
- Gene Nelson as Gordon Evans
- Frank Lovejoy as John Webber
- Steve Cochran as Rick Sommers
- Patrice Wymore as Karen Keene
- Virginia Gibson as Angela Korinna
- Larry Keating as Mitchell Parks
- Paul Picerni as Jud Kellogg
- Nedrick Young as Rafferty
- Jacqueline deWit as Lisa Kramer
- Steve Condos as Specialty Dancer (as Condos)
- Jerry Brandow as Specialty Dancer (as Brandow)
- Douglas Spencer as Lew Ludlow
- Mabel Albertson as Velma Trumbull
- Lenny Sherman as Ernest Tandy
- Cliff Ferre as Lyn Humphries
- Ray Kyle as Mickey Zealand
- Sy Milano as Baritone Singer

== Musical numbers ==
- 1) Overture/I'll Take You/Behind the Mask - Played by Orchestra
- 2) I May Be Wrong - Sung by Gene Nelson
- 3) I'll Take You - Sung and Danced by Virginia Mayo (dubbed by Bonnie Lou Williams) and Gene Nelson
- 4) One Step Ahead - Sung and Danced by Patrice Wymore, Steve Condos and Jerry Brandow
- 5) Break the Ties That Bind You - Sung by Virginia Mayo (dubbed by Bonnie Lou Williams)
- 6) Breakfast in Bed - Sung and Danced by Virginia Mayo (dubbed by Bonnie Lou Williams) and Chorus
- 7) Mardi Gras - Sung by Sy Milano and Chorus, then Danced by Patrice Wymore and Chorus
- 7.1) Behind the Mask - Sung by Sy Milano, then Danced by Virginia Mayo and Chorus
- 7.2) Mardi Gras (reprise) - Danced by Gene Nelson
- 7.3) Behind the Mask (reprise) - Sung by Chorus, Danced by Virginia Mayo, Gene Nelson and Chorus
- 8) I'll Take You (reprise) - Sung and Danced by Virginia Mayo (dubbed by Bonnie Lou Williams), Gene Nelson and Chorus
