= Wonder Man (film) =

1945 film by H. Bruce Humberstone

- Original 1946 cinema poster
- Directed by: H. Bruce Humberstone
- Screenplay by: Don Hartman; Melville Shavelson; Philip Rapp; Jack Jevne (adaptation); Eddie Moran (adaptation)
- Story by: Arthur Sheekman
- Produced by: Samuel Goldwyn
- Starring: Danny Kaye; Virginia Mayo; Vera-Ellen
- Cinematography: Victor Milner; William E. Snyder
- Edited by: Daniel Mandell
- Music by: Ray Heindorf; Heinz Roemheld
- Color process: Technicolor
- Production company: Samuel Goldwyn Productions
- Distributed by: RKO Radio Pictures
- Release date: June 8, 1945 (US)
- Running time: 98 minutes
- Country: United States
- Language: English
- Budget: $1,450,000

Wonder Man is a 1945 supernatural musical film directed by H. Bruce Humberstone and starring Danny Kaye and Virginia Mayo. It is based on a short story by Arthur Sheekman, adapted for the screen by a staff of writers led by Jack Jevne and Eddie Moran, and produced by Samuel Goldwyn. Mary Grant designed the film's costumes.

== Plot ==
Danny Kaye plays a double role as a pair of estranged "super-identical twins". Despite their almost indistinguishable looks, the two have very different personalities. Buster Dingle, who goes by the stage name "Buzzy Bellew", is a loud and goofy performer at the Pelican Club, while Edwin Dingle is a studious, quiet bookworm writing a history book. The two brothers have not seen each other for years.

Buster becomes the witness to a murder committed by mob boss "Ten Grand" Jackson and is promptly murdered himself. He comes back as a ghost, calling on his long-lost brother for help to bring the killer to justice. As a result, the shy Edwin must take his brother's place until after his testimony is given.

In the meantime, he has to dodge Jackson's hitmen and fill in for Buster at the nightclub. To help him out, Buster – who cannot be seen or heard by anyone but Edwin – possesses him, with outrageously goofy results.

Edwin, possessed by Buzzy, performs a bit where he pretends to be a famous Russian singer allergic to flowers. A vase of flowers is nonetheless placed on a table near him, and his song, "Otchi Chornya", is frequently interrupted by his loud and goofy-sounding sneezes.

The love interests of the brothers further complicate the situation; while the murdered Buster was engaged to entertainer Midge Mallon, librarian Ellen Shanley admires Edwin.

In the end, Ellen marries Edwin, while Midge consoles herself by marrying the owner of the Pelican Club.

== Cast ==
- Danny Kaye as Edwin Dingle and Buzzy Bellew
- Virginia Mayo as Ellen Shanley
- Vera-Ellen as Midge Mallon
- Donald Woods as Monte Rossen
- S. Z. Sakall as Schmidt
- Allen Jenkins as Chimp
- Edward Brophy as Torso
- Otto Kruger as District Attorney
- Steve Cochran as Ten Grand Jackson
- Richard Lane as Asst. District Attorney
- Natalie Schafer as Mrs. Hume
- Gisela Werbezirk as Mrs. Schmidt
- Alice Mock as Prima Donna
- The Goldwyn Girls as Themselves
- Huntz Hall as Sailor
- Virginia Gilmore as the Sailor's Girlfriend

In addition, an uncredited June Hutton provided the singing voice for Vera-Ellen.

== Production credits ==
- Director – H. Bruce Humberstone
- Producer – Samuel Goldwyn
- Writing – Don Hartman, Melville Shavelson and Philip Rapp (screenplay); Jack Jevne and Eddie Moran (adaptation); Arthur Sheekman (original story)
- Cinematography – Victor Milner and William Snyder (directors of photography)
- Music – Sylvia Fine (music and lyrics); Ray Heindorf (musical orchestration and conducting)
- Art direction – Ernst Fegté (art director), McClure Capps (associate art direction), Howard Bristol (set decoration)
- Film editor – Daniel Mandell
- Music – Louis Forbes (musical director)
- Choreography – John Wray
- Costumes – Travis Banton
- Makeup – Robert Stephanoff
- Special effects – John P. Fulton (special photographic effects)
- Technicolor color director – Natalie Kalmus
- Sound – Fred Lau (sound recorder)

== Awards ==
The film won an Academy Award for Best Special Effects at the 18th Academy Awards in 1946, and was also nominated for Best Original Song, Best Musical Score, and Best Sound Recording.

The film was also entered into the 1946 Cannes Film Festival.

== See also ==
- List of ghost films
