= Stop, You're Killing Me =

1952 film by Roy Del Ruth

- 1953 Theatrical Poster
- Directed by: Roy Del Ruth
- Written by: Damon Runyon (play); Howard Lindsay (play); James O'Hanlon
- Starring: Broderick Crawford
- Cinematography: Ted D. McCord
- Edited by: Owen Marks
- Music by: David Buttolph; Ray Heindorf; Howard Jackson
- Production company: Warner Bros. Pictures
- Distributed by: Warner Bros. Pictures
- Release dates: December 10, 1952 (New York City); January 17, 1953 (General release)
- Running time: 86 minutes
- Country: United States
- Language: English

Stop, You're Killing Me is a 1952 American black comedy film directed by Roy Del Ruth and starring Broderick Crawford, Claire Trevor and Virginia Gibson.

The film is set shortly after the Repeal of Prohibition in the United States (1933). A former rum-runner attempts to operate a legitimate brewery, but is soon bankrupt due to poor sales. He has to deal with several personal and professional problems at the same time, including his daughter's engagement to a police officer.

== Plot ==
When the Eighteenth Amendment of the Constitution is repealed, former prohibition baron Remy Marko ventures into the legal production and marketing of beer. The poor quality of his product leads him to bankruptcy.

His daughter Mary intends to marry policeman Chance Whitelaw, heir to a wealthy family. Remy and his wife Nora organize a lavish reception at a fancy hotel in Saratoga, but the party is disrupted by the murder of four gangsters at the hands of a mobster who works for Remy's creditors. Remy must juggle his family, his daughter's future marriage, his bankrupt business and the police investigation in order to save his new image.

== Cast ==
- Broderick Crawford as Remy Marko
- Claire Trevor as Nora Marko
- Virginia Gibson as Mary Marko
- Bill Hayes as Chancellor "Chance" Whitelaw
- Margaret Dumont as Mrs. Harriet Whitelaw
- Harry Morgan as Innocence

== Production ==
The script is based on the 1935 play A Slight Case of Murder by Damon Runyon and Howard Lindsay. Warner Bros. had previously adapted Runyon and Lindsay's play into a 1938 film under the play's title starring Edward G. Robinson and directed by Lloyd Bacon.

The film was in production from mid-June to late August 1952.
