= The West Point Story (film) =

1950 film by Roy Del Ruth

- Theatrical release poster
- Directed by: Roy Del Ruth
- Screenplay by: Irving Wallace; Charles Hoffman; John Monks Jr.
- Story by: Irving Wallace
- Produced by: Louis F. Edelman
- Starring: James Cagney; Virginia Mayo; Doris Day
- Cinematography: Sidney Hickox
- Edited by: Owen Marks
- Music by: Ray Heindorf
- Distributed by: Warner Bros. Pictures
- Release dates: November 22, 1950 (Los Angeles); December 22, 1950 (New York)
- Running time: 107 minutes
- Country: United States
- Language: English
- Budget: $1,632,000
- Box office: $2,890,000 $1.8 million (US rentals)

The West Point Story (also known as Fine and Dandy) is a 1950 musical comedy film directed by Roy Del Ruth and starring James Cagney, Virginia Mayo and Doris Day.

== Plot ==
Producer Harry Eberhart offers unemployed Broadway musical director and past nemesis Elwin "Bix" Bixby the job of staging the annual 100th Night show at the United States Military Academy in West Point, New York. Eberhart wishes for his talented nephew Tom Fletcher, a cadet at the academy, to become a Broadway star.

Bix and his assistant and girlfriend Eve Dillon travel to West Point to make a Broadway-level production of a show written by Tom and his friend Hal Courtland. After Bix coldcocks cast member Cadet Bull Gilbert, the Academy's Commandant wants to ban him from the Academy's grounds; but the cadets in the show, led by Tom, appeal to the Commandant, requesting that Bix might be permitted to live as one of them as a temporary cadet. The Commandant is dubious because of Bix's history – during his World War II service, Bix earned a Distinguished Service Cross, a Silver Star, and the French Medaille Militaire, but also sold a B-17 to an Arab sheikh and went Absent Without Leave from a rest camp to fight with the French Resistance – but agrees to the request.

Bix persuades Jan Wilson, a chorus girl whom he had discovered who has become a movie star, to accompany Tom to a dance at the academy. She is given the role of a princess in the show after Bix persuades the Commandant to break with the tradition of only permitting male cadets to appear in shows. (At the time the movie was made, West Point was a males-only school.) After Jan and Tom fall in love, Tom submits his resignation to the Academy and flees to New York to be with Jan. Tom proposes marriage but Jan declines, believing that Tom must graduate and serve his commitment. Bix, Bull and Hal travel to New York without approved leave in order to retrieve Tom, who is devastated by Jan's rejection.

Bix intercepts and destroys Tom's resignation letter before it is received, but Tom, Bull and Hal are arrested on their return to the academy by order of the commandant and confined to quarters except when on duty or in class. The show is threatened with cancellation.

Bix and the cadets in the show arrange a meeting with the French Premier, who is visiting the country on a diplomatic mission. They know that a visiting dignitary can request amnesty for cadets' disciplinary offenses and approach the Premier as the one man who can save the show. After Bix shows him his Medaille Militaire, the Premier agrees and the show will go on.

Harry visits West Point to see the show, presuming that he will return with his nephew who will then begin his Broadway career. Deciding that her love for Tom is more important than her career, Jan arrives at the academy just in time to appear in the show and reconcile with Tom.

Backstage, Bix defiantly tells Harry that Tom will remain a cadet. Harry tells him he will never work in show business again. Bix tries to punch Harry but instead strikes Hal, knocking him unconscious and injuring his leg. With Hal unable to perform, Bix takes the stage with Eve for the dance number "It Could Only Happen in Brooklyn."

Before the show's finale, Tom calls Bix to the stage and presents him with the show's book and libretto so that Bix can produce it on Broadway. The Finale is then performed and the curtain falls.

== Cast ==
- James Cagney as Elwin 'Bix' Bixby
- Virginia Mayo as Eve Dillon (singing voice dubbed by Bonnie Lou Williams)
- Doris Day as Jan Wilson
- Gordon MacRae as Tom Fletcher
- Gene Nelson as Hal Courtland
- Alan Hale Jr. as Bull Gilbert
- Roland Winters as Harry Eberhart
- Raymond Roe as Bixby's "Wife" - his roommate who teaches him cadet customs and lore
- Wilton Graff as Lieutenant Colonel Martin
- Jerome Cowan as Mr. Jocelyn

== Production ==
The film project, with a working title of Classmates, was developed by producer Louis F. Edelman starting in 1948, with Irving Wallace writing the screenplay. The United States Military Academy in West Point, New York appointed a committee of four officers and 24 cadets to assist with the production, and Major Robert Bringham consulted with Edelman and Wallace in Hollywood. Colonel William Proctor from the academy served as the film's technical advisor. The production staff attempted to convey the human aspects of the academy rather than relying on film clichés involving strict discipline and order.

In December 1948, Jack Carson, Gordon MacRae and Doris Day were slated as the stars of the film. James Cagney was announced as the lead in March 1949 after signing a contract with Warner Bros. Pictures, the studio for whom he had worked for many years, having departed after his Academy Award-winning performance in Yankee Doodle Dandy (1942). The deal included Cagney's starring role in White Heat and another feature, speculated to be John Paul Jones, a film that was not produced until 1959 and without Cagney. The contract also included a three-film commitment for Cagney's struggling production company, which yielded Kiss Tomorrow Goodbye (1950) and A Lion Is in the Streets (1953) for Warner Bros. before folding.

Warner Bros. location head William Guthrie consulted with the Department of War in Washington, D.C. to receive the agency's approval. Songwriters Sammy Cahn and Jule Styne visited the U.S. Military Academy for inspiration, and Wallace and fellow writer Charles Hoffman traveled to West Point to review the script with the academy's leaders. The academy granted 40 cadets a leave of absence to appear in the film as extras.

Cagney reported to the studio long before production began for three weeks of intensive dance rehearsal, as he had not danced in a film since Yankee Doodle Dandy in 1942.

Director Roy Del Ruth supervised location shooting at West Point, which was completed in May 1950. Studio production began in June and wrapped by mid-August.

== Music ==
1. "Hail Alma Mater", sung by chorus behind titles
2. "It's Raining Sundrops", sung by chorus, danced by James Cagney, Virginia Mayo and chorus in rehearsal
3. "One Hundred Days 'Til June", sung by Gordon MacRae and chorus
4. "By the Kissing Rock", sung by Gordon MacRae, danced by Gordon MacRae, Alan Hale Jr. and chorus
5. "By the Kissing Rock" (Reprise 1), sung and danced by James Cagney and Virginia Mayo (dubbed by Bonnie Lou Williams)
6. "Long Before I Knew You" , sung by Gordon MacRae, danced by Gene Nelson
7. "Long Before I Knew You", danced by Gene Nelson
8. "Ten Thousand Four Hundred Thirty-Two Sheep", sung by Doris Day and chorus
9. "The Military Polka", sung and danced by Doris Day, Gordon MacRae, James Cagney, Virginia Mayo (dubbed by Bonnie Lou Williams), Gene Nelson and chorus
10. "You Love Me", sung by Gordon MacRae
11. "By the Kissing Rock" (Reprise 2), sung by Gordon MacRae and Doris Day
12. "By the Kissing Rock" (Reprise 3), sung by Virginia Mayo (dubbed by Bonnie Lou Williams)
13. "The Corps", sung by Gordon MacRae and chorus
14. "The Toy Trumpet", danced by Gene Nelson and chorus
15. "You Love Me" (Reprise), sung by Gordon MacRae and Doris Day
16. "B 'Postrophe K No 'Postrophe L-Y-N / It Could Only Happen in Brooklyn", sung by James Cagney and chorus, danced by James Cagney, Virginia Mayo and chorus
17. "This Is the Finale", sung and danced by Doris Day, Gordon MacRae, James Cagney, Virginia Mayo (dubbed by Bonnie Lou Williams), Gene Nelson and chorus

== Reception ==
In a contemporary review for The New York Times, critic Bosley Crowther wrote: "The measure of Mr. Cagney's impact upon the whole tenuous show is patently indicated when he is not on the screen. For then the thing sags in woeful fashion, the romance becomes absurd and the patriotic chest-thumping becomes so much chorus-boy parade. ... However, the show is Mr. Cagney's — as much as there is of it. And he makes it twirl like a baton when he has it in his veteran hands."

Critic Philip K. Scheuer of the Los Angeles Times wrote: "The tortuous, hard-to-follow story seems forever struggling to impose an authentic, documentary quality on the light framework of a happy-go-lucky musical. ... The overall treatment reflects little glory on West Point — not because of such a break in precedent (one expects these liberties in a movie) so much as because the whole approach is brassy and tasteless."

According to Warner Bros. records, the film earned $2,146,000 domestically and $744,000 internationally.

== Awards ==
The film received two award nominations. Ray Heindorf was nominated for the 1950 Academy Award for Best Music, Scoring of a Musical Picture, losing to Annie Get Your Gun, and John Monks Jr., Charles Hoffman and Irving Wallace were nominated for the 1951 Writers Guild of America award for Best Written American Musical.
