= Starlift =

1951 film by Roy Del Ruth

- Theatrical release poster
- Directed by: Roy Del Ruth
- Screenplay by: John D. Klorer; Karl Kamb
- Story by: John D. Klorer
- Produced by: Robert Arthur
- Starring: Doris Day; Gordon MacRae; Ruth Roman; Janice Rule; Dick Wesson; Ron Hagerthy
- Cinematography: Ted McCord
- Edited by: William H. Ziegler
- Music by: Howard Jackson
- Production company: Warner Bros. Pictures
- Distributed by: Warner Bros. Pictures
- Release dates: November 14, 1951 (Travis Air Force Base); November 16, 1951 (Los Angeles); December 14, 1951 (New York)
- Running time: 103 minutes
- Country: United States
- Language: English
- Box office: $1.9 million (rentals)

Starlift (also known as Operation Starlift) is a 1951 American Warner Bros. Pictures musical film directed by Roy Del Ruth and written by John D. Klorer and Karl Kamb from a story by Klorer, who died before the film was released. The film stars Doris Day, Gordon MacRae, Virginia Mayo, Dick Wesson and Ruth Roman. Produced at the inception of the Korean War, Starlift centers on an Air Force flyer's wish to meet a film star who performs with other stars for injured men at the base.

== Plot ==
United States Air Force flyers Rick Williams and Mike Nolan attempt to meet Nell Wayne, a film star performing in a star-studded musical in San Francisco. Rick and Nell both hail from Youngstown, Ohio, but they have never met. Mike attempts to convince the staff and cast members at the theater that Rick and Nell are close best friends. Ruth Roman takes them to meet Nell, but the men first meet with Doris Day and Gordon MacRae.

When they find that Nell is not there, Mike claims that they are leaving for to the Korean front that night. Ruth and Doris feel guilty and they invite the boys to lunch. Nell arrives, but not knowing Mike, she attempts to cut the visit short.

Waiting for Nell caused the boys to miss their bus, so Doris, Ruth and Nell drive them back to Travis Air Force Base. However, the boys are not headed for Korea; they instead operate routine transport flights to Honolulu. At the transport terminal, many soldiers are waiting for their flights. Doris takes the stage to dance to and sing "'S Wonderful", while Nell and Ruth head to the runway to kiss Rick goodbye. Nell gives Rick a good-luck charm from her bracelet. As they watch the aircraft depart, their driver, a colonel, suggests that they greet wounded soldiers at the hospital, where Doris sings a medley of "You Oughta Be in Pictures" and "You Do Something to Me".

The ladies return to San Francisco to perform. When an aircraft with wounded soldiers arrives from Honolulu, with Rick and Mike aboard but uninjured, Nell is furious that Rick had lied about their assignment. However, she keeps a positive face for gossip columnist Louella Parsons, and the "Operation Starlift" celebrities perform at the base. The next morning, they sing "Liza (All the Clouds'll Roll Away)" and dance while the aircraft leave.

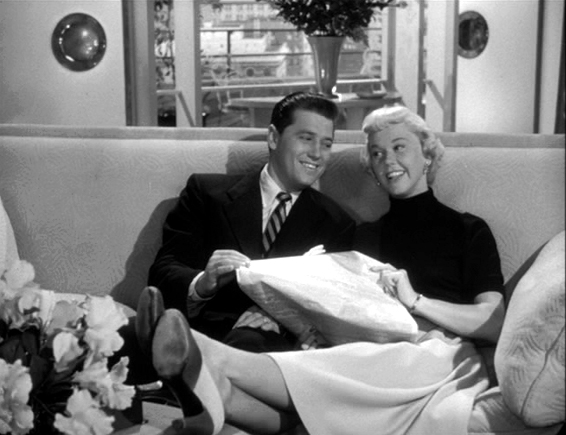
Doris Day and Gordon MacRae

The cast perform "God's Green Acres of Home" and "It's Magic" for the men at the base. The next day, the Warner Bros. president arranges for several actors to perform at the base that night. While visiting her parents, Nell finds that Rick and his parents are at her home. After dinner, the Waynes take the Williamses to a movie, leaving Nell and Rick in the house alone together. They quarrel and Rick returns the charm. The next morning, when the Williamses arrive, Nell finds that Rick has been sent overseas ahead of schedule. She rushes to the base, but his flight had already left.

The Starlift, the aircraft containing the film stars, arrives with Virginia Mayo and Phil Harris, who intentionally loses $750 to a soldier while playing gin rummy before performing "Look Out, Stranger, I'm a Texas Ranger". Rick's aircraft arrives, but he runs from the hangar where Nell is waiting. While writing a letter to him, Nell sees Rick and pursues him into a cafeteria, where she poses as a waitress and prepares a chocolate malt just as she had done in Youngstown, where her family owned a malt shop. They drink the malt together and forgive each other. The next day, when Rick finally departs, Nell is there to kiss him goodbye.

== Cast ==
- Dick Wesson as Mike Nolan
- Janice Rule as Nell Wayne
- Hayden Rorke as Chaplain
- Ruth Roman as herself
- Doris Day as herself
- Gordon MacRae as himself
- Ron Hagerthy as Cpl. Rick Williams
- Richard Webb as Col. Callan
- Howard St. John as Steve Rogers

=== Guest stars ===
Guest stars appearing in the film include James Cagney, Gary Cooper, Virginia Gibson, Phil Harris, Frank Lovejoy, Lucille Norman, Louella Parsons, Randolph Scott, Jane Wyman and Patrice Wymore.

== Production ==
Beginning in 1950, the real Operation Starlift was a program created by Special Services and the Hollywood Coordinating Committee (successor to the Hollywood Victory Committee) to bring film stars to Travis Air Force Base to entertain wounded soldiers from the Korean War. Ruth Roman was the forerunner of the project, which included stars such as Jane Russell, Shirley Temple, Shelley Winters, Alan Ladd, Jack Benny, Danny Kaye, Claudette Colbert, Keenan Wynn, Donald O'Connor, Janet Leigh, Debbie Reynolds and Bob Hope.

The flights flew the entertainers from Burbank every Saturday and returned them the following day. Shows performed for departing servicemen would usually last between two and three hours. The stars would then perform for men in the hospital auditorium. Operation Starlift concluded in November 1951 after the program had exhausted its funding. It was revived in November 1999 by the USO, with stars including Salma Hayek, Dennis Haskins, Danica McKellar, Garrett Morris and Sheeri Rappaport.

The film was titled Starlift rather than Operation Starlift to avoid confusion with the titles of other contemporary films such as Operation Haylift and Operation Pacific.

Nearly half of Starlift was filmed on location at Travis Air Force Base.

== Music ==
- "You're Gonna Lose Your Gal" — performed by Doris Day and Gordon MacRae
- "'S Wonderful" — performed by Doris Day
- "Lullaby of Broadway" — sung partially by Doris Day
- "You Oughta Be in Pictures / You Do Something to Me" — performed by Doris Day
- "What Is This Thing Called Love?" — sung by Lucille Norman and Gordon MacRae, danced by Gene Nelson and Janice Rule
- "Liza (All the Clouds'll Roll Away)" — sung and danced by Patrice Wymore (singing dubbed by Bonnie Lou Williams)
- "God's Green Acres of Home" — performed by Gordon MacRae
- "It's Magic" — sung and danced by Gene Nelson (singing dubbed by Hal Derwin) and Janice Rule with vocal quartet
- "I May Be Wrong (But I Think You're Wonderful)" — performed by Jane Wyman
- "Noche Caribe (Caribbean Night)" — danced by Virginia Mayo and Dancers
- "Look Out, Stranger, I'm a Texas Ranger" — performed by Phil Harris, Gary Cooper, Virginia Gibson and Frank Lovejoy

== Release ==
The film was first screened at Travis Air Force Base in Fairfield, California on November 14, 1951, with numerous Hollywood stars in attendance, including Gary Cooper, Eddie Bracken, Marie Windsor and Virginia Gibson. A crowd of nearly 1,000 base personnel and injured servicemen assembled for the screening, which was preceded by a radio program featuring Queen for a Day host Jack Bailey.

== Reception ==
In a contemporary review for The New York Times, critic Bosley Crowther called the film a "fruitless picture" and wrote: "The acts are unspeakably slapdash and the romance is painful beyond words ... Let's be brief about it: the performances given by Miss Rule and Ron Hagerthy as the flier are as sappy as they could possibly be, and Dick Wesson as a pushy pal of the flier is downright insufferable. ... The washout of Operation Starlift is understandable if it depended on such 'entertainment' as is exhibited in this film."

Critic Philip K. Scheuer of the Los Angeles Times wrote: "The film, a Warner Bros. production in the style of 'Hollywood Hotel' and 'Hollywood Canteen,' proceeds, like them, on the assumption that seeing high-salaried talent on the screen and hearing It called by its right name gives us folks out front the same vicarious thrill we'd get if those big shots were up there 'in person.' I believe this assumption to be largely erroneous. ... The comedy is, in my opinion, perfectly terrible ... The most frequently expressed criticism of 'Starlift' is that it needs color. In today's competitive market, it needs more than color."

== Home video ==
On April 7, 2009, Warner Archive released Starlift as a Region 1 DVD as part of the Doris Day Spotlight Collection. The five-disc set contains digitally remastered versions of It's a Great Feeling (1949), Tea for Two (1950), April in Paris (1952) and The Tunnel of Love (1958).
