= Jack Douglas (television host) =

Television pioneer, host and producer (1921–1994)

Jonathon Aivaz (May 1, 1921 – April 13, 1994), known professionally as Jack Douglas, was an Iranian-born American pioneer in the television industry. He produced and hosted a variety of travel and adventure television series, ultimately establishing the style typically used by travel shows today. Douglas also pioneered in producing television shows in color, rather than in black and white, before the practice became common. He would pay the extra cost to shoot his films in color, even when they were still being projected in black and white on television.

== Biography ==
Douglas was born in Kermanshah, Iran on May 1, 1921, to parents who were both Assyrians from Iran. The family fled to France in the early 1920s. By 1928, Douglas and his family had settled in New Britain, Connecticut, where Douglas grew up.

Douglas eventually moved to Los Angeles, where he entered the television industry. In 1954, he created a travel series called I Search for Adventure, and then submitted it to seven independent television stations in Los Angeles. Only one of those seven stations, KCOP, accepted his series. With the success of I Search for Adventure, Douglas continued to create other travel and adventure series for television including Bold Journey, America!, Seven League Boots, Kingdom of the Sea, Seven Seas, and Keyhole. For his pioneering efforts in the television industry, Douglas was awarded a star on the Hollywood Walk of Fame, which is embedded on the 6700 block of Hollywood Boulevard.

Douglas died in Los Angeles on April 13, 1994, at the age of 72.
