= Once Upon a Honeymoon (1956 film) =

1956 film by Gower Champion

- Directed by: Gower Champion
- Written by: Kenneth H. Bennett; Leo S. Rosencrans
- Produced by: Jerry Fairbanks
- Starring: Virginia Gibson; Ward Ellis; Alan Mowbray; Chick Chandler; Veronica Pataky; Russell Hicks
- Cinematography: Jerry Fairbanks
- Edited by: Milton Kleinberg
- Production company: Jerry Fairbanks Productions
- Release date: 1956
- Running time: 14 mins
- Country: United States
- Language: English

Once Upon a Honeymoon is a 1956 American musical fantasy short film directed by Gower Champion and starring Virginia Gibson and Ward Ellis. The film was sponsored by Bell Telephone to promote its new telephones in colors to compliment modern home decor. The Western Electric Model 500 desk telephone and its wall version, the Model 554, are featured in a variety of colors.

Once Upon a Honeymoon was featured and mocked during a 1996 episode of Mystery Science Theater 3000, and the short has gained a cult following. Clips were also shown in "The Telephone" episode of The Secret Life of Machines.

The film is in the public domain.

== Plot ==
A group of angels are having a conference in a cloud about newlyweds Jeff and Mary, who have been trying to take a honeymoon but are repeatedly forced to postpone because of Jeff's work commitments as a songwriter. The couple's guardian angel Wilbur is sent to Earth to help Jeff write a new song for an upcoming musical so that he and Mary can finally leave on their honeymoon.

While Jeff struggles to write a new song, Mary daydreams about a new home. With the help of Wilbur, Mary imagines having the latest household products, including telephones provided by Bell. Wilbur helps Jeff write a new song called "A Castle in the Sky," allowing the couple to finally leave on their much-anticipated honeymoon.

== Cast ==
- Virginia Gibson as Mary
- Ward Ellis as Jeff
- Chick Chandler as Wilbur the guardian angel
- Alan Mowbray as Gordon, Jeff's Boss
- Veronica Pataky as Sonya
- Russell Hicks as the Chief Angel

== See also ==
- List of American films of 1956
- List of films about angels
- Design for Dreaming
