= Rocky Mountain (film) =

1950 film

- Theatrical release poster
- Directed by: William Keighley
- Written by: Winston Miller
- Based on: story Ghost Mountain by Alan Le May
- Produced by: William Jacobs
- Starring: Errol Flynn; Patrice Wymore
- Cinematography: Ted McCord
- Edited by: Rudi Fehr
- Music by: Max Steiner
- Production company: Warner Bros. Pictures
- Distributed by: Warner Bros. Pictures
- Release date: November 11, 1950
- Running time: 83 minutes
- Country: United States
- Language: English
- Box office: $1.7 million (US)

Rocky Mountain is a 1950 American Western film directed by William Keighley and starring Errol Flynn. It also stars Patrice Wymore, who married Flynn in 1950. The film is set in California near the end of the American Civil War.

Filmink magazine called it "a hidden gem, one of Flynn's best Westerns."

== Plot ==
A car pulls up to an historical marker in the desert that reads:

ROCKY MOUNTAIN, also known as Ghost Mountain. On March 26, 1865, a detachment of Confederate cavalry crossed the state line into California under secret orders from Gen. Robert E. Lee to rendezvous at Ghost Mountain with one Cole Smith, with instructions to place the flag atop the mountain, and though their mission failed, the heroism displayed by these gallant men honored the cause for which they fought so valiantly.

In 1865, eight horsemen trek across the California desert, arriving at Ghost Mountain. Led by Captain Lafe Barstow of the Mississippi Mountain Rifles. The eight soldiers encounter a man who calls himself California Beal. As a last desperate effort to turn the tide of the war, Barstow's mission is to persuade Cole Smith and his 500 men to raid California on behalf of the Confederacy. From their vantage point on the mountain, the men see a Shoshone war party attack a stagecoach. Barstow's men charge and drive off the Shoshone after the stage overturns, rescuing driver Gil Craigie and the only surviving passenger, Johanna Carter, traveling to join her fiancé, Union Army officer Lt. Rickey.

That night, the Indians burn the stage. Next morning, a detachment of four Union soldiers and three Shoshone scouts examine the ashes. Barstow's men ambush the detachment, killing one and capturing the rest, including Lt. Rickey. From them, Barstow learns that the Union knows about their presence in California and that California Beal is actually Cole Smith himself. Smith leaves, promising to return in two days with his men. Craigie talks with the Shoshone scouts and learns that they are really a chief, Man Dog, and his sons. He warns Barstow that they will escape and return with their tribe. That night, while Jimmy is on watch, the Indians try to escape. The soldiers kill two of them, but Man Dog evades their bullets.

In the morning, Rickey suggests that he take Johanna to a nearby garrison before the Indians arrive. Barstow, however, hopes that Smith's men will come before the Indians do and rejects the suggestion. Near dawn, Rickey's men jump their guards. One dies in the attempt, and another's recaptured, but Rickey makes his escape. The Southerners find a riderless horse but it turns out to be Smith's, not Rickey's, and they realize that help is not coming.

Barstow decides to use all his men to lure the Indians away from the mountain while Johanna, Craigie and the Union trooper escape. The greatly outnumbered Rebels ride into a box canyon and turn to fight, charging the Shoshone. During the battle, Rickey returns with a troop of Union cavalry, and Johanna tells Rickey what has happened. The cavalry attempt to save Barstow's men but are too late; all the Southerners have been killed. Rickey raises their rebel flag on top of Rocky Mountain to salute the bravery of their fallen foes.

== Cast ==
- Errol Flynn as Capt. Lafe Barstow
- Patrice Wymore as Johanna Carter
- Scott Forbes as Lt. Rickey
- Guinn "Big Boy" Williams as "Pap" Dennison (credited as Guinn Williams)
- Dickie Jones as Jimmy Wheat (credited as Dick Jones)
- Howard Petrie as Cole Smith "California Beal"
- Slim Pickens as Plank
- Chubby Johnson as Gil Craigie
- Sheb Wooley as Kay Rawlins

== Production ==
The film was originally titled Ghost Mountain, the title of the original story by Alan Le May. Ronald Reagan badly wanted to do a Western at the time and said that Jack Warner promised he could star in one if the actor found an ideal story. Reagan claimed he discovered Ghost Story and helped negotiate its purchase by Warners through his agent, MCA. Warner Bros. Pictures purchased it in November 1948 for $35,000, with William Jacobs assigned to produce. Reagan was announced as a potential star in November 1948. Errol Flynn, who had appeared in a number of successful Westerns for Warners, was also named as a possibility.

In March 1950 Ghost Mountain was put on Warners' schedule. By April the film was retitled Rocky Mountain and Flynn was given the lead role over Reagan, to the latter's annoyance, as he felt he had brought the story to the studio. Reagan left Warner Bros soon afterwards. (Flynn had meant to do another Western, Carson City, but it was felt that script was not as ready.) Winston Miller was brought in to write the script.

In May Lauren Bacall was assigned to play the female lead under her contract with Warner Bros but turned it down and was suspended as a result. Bacall said at the time:

I turned it down because it's just not a part. It's kind of nothing. I'm not angry, I'm just incredulous. I've never been offered a role like this before. I don't want to do it and they shouldn't have to pay me. I shouldn't imagine they'll have any trouble replacing me.

Bacall was replaced by Patrice Wymore, a dancer who had recently been put under contract to Warners. By July, Bacall terminated her contract with Warners.

Filming started May 29, 1950, on location in Gallup, New Mexico. At the beginning of filming, Flynn was engaged to Princess Irene Ghika. During filming he fell in love with Wymore. Their engagement was announced in August and they later married.

While making the film Flynn said he had become interested in stories about Kit Carson and was going to make a film about him. However, this never happened.

== Reception ==
=== Critical reaction ===
The Washington Post called Rocky Mountain a "good and interestingly made picture".

The Los Angeles Times said "it comes so close to being an exceptional figure that no one could have been sorrier than this reviewer to see it fall short... the reason is, I think, the characterizations lack forceful definition."

=== Box Office ===
Rocky Mountain earned £125,231 at the English box office. In France, it had admissions of 1,459,012. According to Variety, the film earned $1.7 in America by the end of 1950.

=== Legacy ===
According to James Garner, the script for Rocky Mountain was used as the basis for the first episode of the TV series Maverick. The film was also used as the basis for the first episode of the television series Cheyenne (1955) entitled "Mountain Fortress" on September 20, 1955.
