= She's Working Her Way Through College =

1952 film by H. Bruce Humberstone

- Theatrical release poster
- Directed by: H. Bruce Humberstone
- Screenplay by: Peter Milne
- Based on: The Male Animal (1940 play) by Elliott Nugent; James Thurber
- Produced by: William Jacobs
- Starring: Virginia Mayo; Ronald Reagan; Gene Nelson
- Cinematography: Wilfred M. Cline
- Edited by: Clarence Kolster
- Music by: Ray Heindorf
- Production company: Warner Bros. Pictures
- Distributed by: Warner Bros. Pictures
- Release date: July 12, 1952
- Running time: 104 minutes
- Country: United States
- Language: English
- Box office: $2.4 million

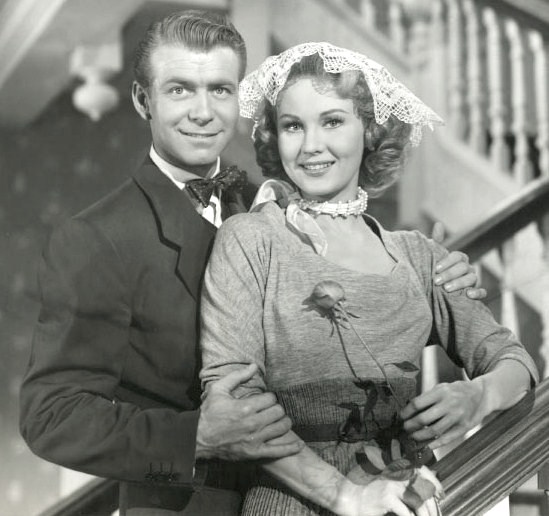
Gene Nelson and Virginia Mayo

She's Working Her Way Through College is a 1952 American comedy film produced by Warner Bros. Pictures. A musical comedy in Technicolor, Virginia Mayo and Ronald Reagan. Directed by H. Bruce Humberstone, the picture is a reworking of the 1940 Broadway play The Male Animal by James Thurber and Elliott Nugent into a musical (although the play's title is not mentioned in the screen credits).

== Plot ==
In the early 1950s, Angela Gardner is a New York City burlesque star known as Hot Garters Gertie. A professional dancer, she chose to headline a risqué review solely to earn money for a college education. She wants to be a writer, and has been working on a play for many years.

She accidentally connects with her former high-school teacher John Palmer, a professor of English at Midwest State on a visit to exploring the city's Theater District for an upcoming playwriting class he's set to teach. Angela mistakenly thinks that Palmer wants to meet her privately when she receives a mink coat after the show, but discovers when she goes to return it that it had been sent by a wealthy older man, who tries unsuccessfully to seduce her.

Seeing an opportunity to connect with an educator she respects, Angela enrolls at Midwest State. Palmer, aware of Angela's problematic past, nonetheless encourages her ambitions both to earn a degree and finish her play.

Palmer has a longstanding rivalry with former college-football All-American Shep Slade, the randy ex-beau of Palmer's wife Helen. With the help of fellow student Don Weston, quarterback of the school's football team, and despite interference from the jealous "Poison Ivy" Williams, Angele's top campus rival and pursuer of Weston, Angela succeeds in her studies.

Palmer suggests that she turn her play into a musical, which is adopted by the school's theatrical arts class as an break from their woefully unattended usual Shakespeare slate. "Poison Ivy" discovers Angela's past, and, when blackmail fails, exposes it in the college newspaper.

Encouraged by Slade, morally conservative chairman of the board of trustees Fred Copeland demands her expulsion. Palmer is defiant and defends Angela at an open-school assembly, arguing it will set a precedent for discriminating against future students based on their faith, nationality, and life choices. The student body thunderously agrees.

Angela demands that Copeland expel her face-to-face, only to discover that he is the man who had tried to seduce her. Threatening him with the mink she never returned, the mortified philanderer drops his expulsion campaign and embraces the musical going on as planned. In return, she hands over her blackmail leverage. Copeland gifts the fur to his wife, who unknowingly beams in it at the performance of Angela's play.

== Cast ==
- Virginia Mayo as Angela Gardner / "Hot Garters Gertie" (singing voice dubbed by Bonnie Lou Williams)
- Ronald Reagan as Professor John Palmer
- Gene Nelson as Don Weston (singing voice was partially dubbed by Hal Derwin)
- Don DeFore as Shep Slade
- Phyllis Thaxter as Helen Palmer
- Patrice Wymore as "Poison" Ivy Williams
- Roland Winters as Fred Copeland
- Raymond Greenleaf as Dean Rogers
- Ginger Crowley as Lonnie - Ivy's Friend
- Norman Bartold as "Tiny" Gordon
- Ramon Blackburn as Singer / Dancer
- Royce Blackburn as Singer / Dancer

== Production ==
In his afterword to TCM's June 2020 airing of the picture, film presenter Dave Karger observed that in 1952, a production using the plot of the using the trial of anarchist Bartholomew Vanzetti presented in the original play and the 1942 film adaptation would have been impossible, because Hollywood in its blacklist era was in the grips of left-wing oppression and red-baiting of McCarthyism.

== Reception ==
Bosley Crowther of The New York Times declared that the best thing in the film was Gene Nelson's gymnastics-dance number. He warned his readers that if they looked closely they would realize that the unnamed play in the opening credits "is none other than those authors' vastly humorous and neatly trenchant The Male Animal... (The) Warner boys have so rearranged and watered down the plot of the original that the resemblance is blissfully remote...And where Mr. Thurber and Mr. Nugent made the fate of their hero turn upon his daring to read a letter by Bartholomew Vanzetti to his English class, Mr. Milne has worked up a crisis over the rights of the little lady to stay in school... But, plainly, the stubborn endeavor to weave a musical story line into the stout fabric of The Male Animal—and such a silly musical story line, at that—has resulted in a combination that does credit to neither one. The musical story is routine...the play has been woefully stripped of humor, pertinence and sting. Bruce Humberstone, who directed, must have felt himself working on mud".
