= The Gordon MacRae Show =

American TV musical series (1956)

- Genre: Musical variety
- Written by: Sheila MacRae
- Directed by: Irv Lambrecht
- Presented by: Gordon MacRae
- Country of origin: United States
- Original language: English
- No. of seasons: 1

Original release
- Network: NBC
- Release: March 5 – August 27, 1956

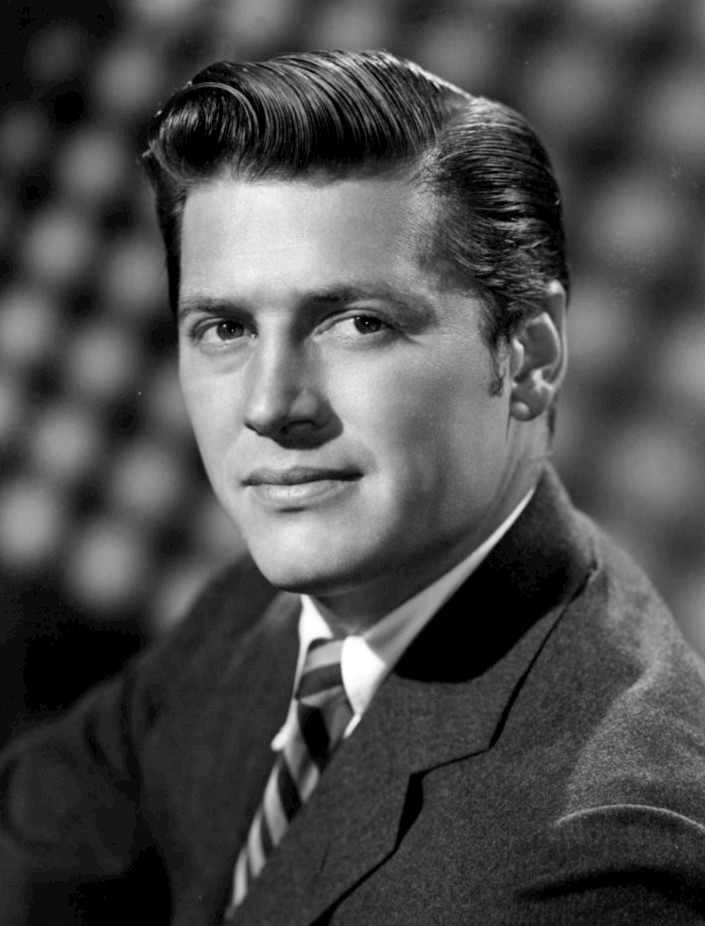
MacRae

The Gordon MacRae Show is an American musical television program that was broadcast on NBC March 5, 1956 - August 27, 1956.

== Overview ==
Gordon MacRae was the host for the show, which was set in a replica of the den in MacRae's home in Hollywood. Episodes featured MacRae's singing, while the Cheerleaders quartet provided vocal backup, and Van Alexander's orchestra provided instrumental music. Phil Harris was the guest on the premiere episode. Guests on other episodes included June Hutton and Jan Clayton.

== Production ==
Irv Lambrecht produced and directed the series. Sheila MacRae was the writer. Lever Brothers was the sponsor, promoting Lifebuoy, Lux, and Pepsodent. A projection technique enabled a picture window in the rear of MacRae's den to display any desired setting, so that scenes appropriate to an episode's songs were shown. The Gordon MacRae Show originated live from Hollywood and was broadcast on Mondays from 7:30 to 7:45 p.m. Eastern Time "to fill the remainder of the half hour in which NBC aired its network news". The show's competition included The Adventures of Robin Hood on CBS and Twilight Theater (and later Bold Journey) on ABC. It replaced The Tony Martin Show and was replaced by The Golden Touch of Frankie Carle.

== Critical response ==
Variety called the premiere episode of The Gordon MacRae Show "all very orthodox and very pleasant" with compliments for MacRae's singing and the show's "tasteful setting". The review found fault with the number of commercials (an "overload of plugs in a 15-minute session").

Motion Picture Daily described that first episode as "Pleasant, diverting and well-handled." The review complimented MacRae's voice and personality and said, "this new quarter-hour of informal melody bids fair to be a must in many homes, not only for the teenagers, but for all sides of the family."

Broadcasting complimented MacRae's songs and his "incredibly relaxed" manner and said that the show's format "looks like it will wear well".
