= Gene Nelson =

American actor, dancer, screenwriter, director (1920–1996)

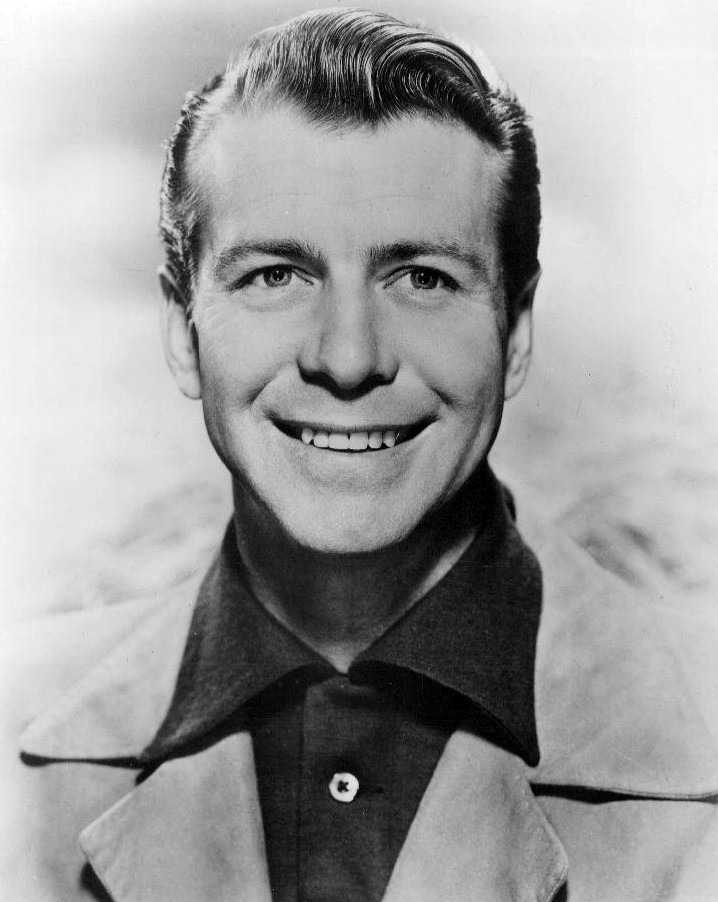
- Nelson in 1953
- Born: Eugene Leander Berg; March 24, 1920; Seattle, Washington, U.S.
- Died: September 16, 1996 (aged 76); Los Angeles, California, U.S.
- Other names: Gene Berg; Eugene E. Nelson
- Occupations: Actor; dancer; director
- Years active: 1938–1980

Gene Nelson (born Leander Eugene Berg; March 24, 1920 – September 16, 1996) was an American actor, dancer, screenwriter, and director.

== Early life ==
Nelson was born Eugene Leander Berg in Seattle, Washington. By 1924, he and his parents moved to Santa Monica. He was inspired to become a dancer during his childhood by watching Fred Astaire in films.

== Career ==
After serving in the Army during World War II, during which he also performed in the musical This Is the Army, Nelson landed his first Broadway role in Lend an Ear. His performance earned a Theatre World Award. He also appeared onstage in Good News. Nelson's longtime professional dance partner during the 1950s was actress JoAnn Dean Killingsworth.

Nelson co-starred with Doris Day in Lullaby of Broadway in 1951. He played Will Parker in the film Oklahoma!

In 1957, Nelson suffered a broken pelvis after being thrown from a horse while filming Natchez Trace, which resulted in his role being re-cast. Nelson sued the production company, Panorama Pictures Corporation, for $150,000, and was awarded $72,675 in 1961 ($783,966 in 2025) for lost wages.

In television, Nelson appeared in 1959 in Northwest Passage as a man trying to prove his innocence in a murder case. Nelson appeared on the March 17, 1960, episode of You Bet Your Life, hosted by Groucho Marx. He and Groucho's daughter, Melinda, performed a dance number together.

Nelson directed eight episodes of The Rifleman in the 1961–62 season. He also directed episodes of the original Star Trek, I Dream of Jeannie (the first season), Gunsmoke (and starred in many others including “Saludos” [1959] and “Say Uncle" [1960]), The Silent Force, and The San Pedro Beach Bums. Nelson directed the Elvis Presley films Kissin' Cousins (1964), for which he also wrote the screenplay, and Harum Scarum (1965). For the Kissin' Cousins screenplay he received a Writers Guild of America award nomination for best written musical. In the late 1980s, he taught in the Theater Arts Department at San Francisco State University.

He starred as Buddy in the 1971 Broadway musical Follies, for which he received a 1972 Tony Award nomination for Featured Actor in a Musical. The production featured a score by Stephen Sondheim, was co-directed by Michael Bennett and Harold Prince, and co-starred Alexis Smith and Dorothy Collins.

== Personal life ==
Nelson was married three times: Miriam Nelson (from 1941 to 1956), Marilyn Morgen (from 1958 to 1974), and Jean Martin (from 1990 to 1994).

== Death ==
Nelson died of cancer, aged 76, in Los Angeles.

== Legacy ==
In 1990, for contributions to the motion picture industry, Nelson was inducted into the Hollywood Walk of Fame. His star is located at 7005 Hollywood Boulevard.

== Filmography ==
=== Actor ===
- Second Fiddle (1939) as Minor Role (uncredited)
- Everything Happens at Night (1939) as Skater (uncredited)
- This Is the Army (1943) as Soldier (uncredited)
- I Wonder Who's Kissing Her Now (1947) as Tommy Yale
- Gentleman's Agreement (1947) as Second Ex-GI in Restaurant (uncredited)
- The Walls of Jericho (1948) as Assistant Prosecutor (uncredited)
- Apartment for Peggy (1948) as Jerry (uncredited)
- The Daughter of Rosie O'Grady (1950) as Doug Martin
- Tea for Two (1950) as Tommy Trainor
- The West Point Story (1950) as Hal Courtland
- Lullaby of Broadway (1951) as Tom Farnham
- Painting the Clouds with Sunshine (1951) as Ted Lansing
- Starlift (1951) as Gene Nelson
- She's Working Her Way Through College (1952) as Don Weston
- She's Back on Broadway (1953) as Gordon Evans
- Crime Wave (1954) as Steve Lacey
- Three Sailors and a Girl (1954) as Twitch
- So This Is Paris (1954) as Al Howard
- The Atomic Man (1955) as Mike Delaney
- Oklahoma! (1955) as Will Parker
- The Way Out (1956) as Greg Carradine
- Shangri-La (1960, TV movie) as Robert
- 20,000 Eyes (1961) as Dan Warren
- The Purple Hills (1961) as Gil Shepard
- Thunder Island (1963) as Billy Poole
- Family Flight (1972, TV Movie) as Aircraft Carrier Captain
- S.O.B. (1981) as Clive Lytell

=== Director ===
- Life with Archie (1962, TV Movie)
- Hand of Death (1962)
- Hootenanny Hoot (1963)
- Your Cheatin' Heart (1964)
- Kissin' Cousins (1964)
- Archie (1964, TV Movie)
- Harum Scarum (1965)
- I Dream of Jeannie (1965, Season 1)
- Where's Everett (1966, TV Movie)
- The Cool Ones (1967)
- Wake Me When the War Is Over (1969, TV Movie)
- The Letters (1973, TV Movie)
- Dan August: The Jealousy Factor (1980, TV Movie)

== Awards and nominations ==
Year	Award	Result	Category	Film
1951	Golden Globe Award	Win	Most Promising Newcomer	Tea for Two
1965	Writers Guild of America Award	Nominated	Best Written American Musical	Kissin' Cousins (Shared with Gerald Drayson Adams)
