= South Sea Woman =

1953 film by Arthur Lubin

- Original film poster
- Directed by: Arthur Lubin
- Screenplay by: Edwin Blum
- Adaptation by: Earl Baldwin; Stanley Shapiro
- Based on: General Court Martial play by William M. Rankin
- Produced by: Samuel Bischoff
- Starring: Burt Lancaster; Virginia Mayo
- Cinematography: Ted D. McCord
- Edited by: Clarence Kolster
- Music by: David Buttolph
- Distributed by: Warner Bros. Pictures
- Release date: June 27, 1953
- Running time: 99 minutes
- Country: United States
- Language: English
- Box office: $2 million (US)

South Sea Woman is a 1953 American black-and-white action-comedy-drama film starring Burt Lancaster, Virginia Mayo and Chuck Connors, and directed by Arthur Lubin. It was based on the play General Court Martial by William M. Rankin with the working title being Sulu Sea. The picture was written by Edwin Blum.

Jeanine Basinger's and Jeremy Arnold's book The World War II Combat Film – Anatomy of a Genre calls the film a significant mixture of genres: tongue-in-cheek adventure, "Flagg and Quirt" (1926)-style service comedy, Road to... Hope and Crosby road film, South Seas, prison escape, pirate, World War II and costume drama mixing ridiculous comedy with hard-boiled action in "Tell It to the Marines" style.

== Plot ==
U.S. Marine Master Gunnery Sergeant James O'Hearn (Burt Lancaster) is being tried at the San Diego Marine base for desertion, theft, scandalous conduct and destruction of property in time of war. He refuses to testify or plead guilty or not guilty to the charges. The film alternates between flashbacks and the courtroom, as witnesses give their testimony.

Showgirl Ginger Martin (Virginia Mayo) takes the stand against his protest. She tells how she met O'Hearn and his friend, Marine Private First Class Davy White (Chuck Connors), of the 4th Marines in Shanghai two weeks before the attack on Pearl Harbor. With war looming, the 4th Marines are ordered out of China. White slips away to propose marriage so that Ginger can be evacuated from China (at government expense) as his wife. O'Hearn tracks him down at the nightclub where Ginger works. When the club's manager objects to Ginger quitting, a brawl breaks out.

The trio escape aboard a small motorboat. When the two men start fighting, Ginger tries to help White and accidentally disables the boat. They drift out to sea and are picked up by a passing junk. Once again, the Marines quarrel over White's future. As a result, their quarrel accidentally sets the sail on fire and they have to chop down the mast in order to save the ship. As a result, they are put ashore on the Vichy French island of Namou.

To avoid being jailed, the Marines persuade pro-Axis Governor Pierre Marchand (Leon Askin) that they are deserters. They are quartered in a hotel/brothel run by Lillie Duval and her three "nieces." O'Hearn is delighted to make their acquaintance, to Ginger's annoyance.

When a supposedly Dutch yacht calls at the island, O'Hearn tries to book passage, but the captain, Van Dorck (Rudolph Anders), refuses to take the risk. O'Hearn discovers that Van Dorck posing as neutral is actually a Nazi naval officer setting up radar stations on the islands around Guadalcanal, and plots to seize the ship with the help of expatriates like ex-U.S. Navy sailor "Jimmylegs" Donovan (Arthur Shields) and fugitive bank embezzler Smith, and Free French liberated from the prison. White refuses to join and says he is deserting and intends to remain on the island with Ginger. This causes Ginger to have second thoughts about their relationship. Interrupting their outdoor wedding ceremony, O'Hearn forces White on board the yacht at gunpoint. Back in the courtroom, O'Hearn breaks his silence in order to exonerate White.

When Van Dorck and a search party find him, O'Hearn manages to kill them all. He and his men then overthrow the governor and load the island's armory, including artillery and explosives on the ship, intending to join the fighting at Guadalcanal. Ginger slips aboard as a patriotic stowaway.

They stumble upon a group of Japanese landing craft escorted by a destroyer. O'Hearn engages the Japanese in a fierce battle. Many lives are lost. When the destroyer tries to ram the yacht, White jumps aboard and climbs its smokestack. He throws in TNT charges, blowing up the destroyer at the cost of his own life. They disable the entire enemy landing fleet. Only O'Hearn and Ginger survive; the rest of the crew die heroically.

The courtmartial exonerates O'Hearn and recommends White for a posthumous Medal of Honor. In a San Diego nightclub, O'Hearn and Ginger reconcile and admit they love each other. When he proposes, she faints. On waking, they kiss.

== Cast ==
- Burt Lancaster as Master Gunnery Sgt. James O'Hearn
- Virginia Mayo as Ginger Martin
- Chuck Connors as PFC Davy White
- Arthur Shields as "Jimmylegs" Donovan
- Barry Kelley as Col. Hickman
- Leon Askin as Pierre Marchand
- Veola Vonn as Lillie Duval
- Bob Sweeney as Defense Lt. Miller
- Hayden Rorke as Prosecutor Lt. Fears
- Raymond Greenleaf as Captain at court martial
- Henri Letondal as Alphonse
- Paul Burke as Ensign Hoyt, a hostile member of the court martial board

== Production ==
The film was announced by Jack Warner in 1952. He wanted to make an action comedy in the vein of Two Arabian Knights. Frank Lovejoy was mentioned as a possible star and the film originally started in Hong Kong as opposed to Shanghai.

Arthur Lubin was given the job of directing in August 1952 when the project was known as Sulu Sea. Lubin says the film was nly made because Lancaster owed the studio one more film. "I was little intimidated when I started the picture because I twas told that Burt was a very, very difficult man to deal with," said Lubin, "but I found him very pleasant."

Burt Lancaster was then signed has star. He had a deal with Warner Bros for them to finance and distribute three movies of his Norma Productions. In return, Lancaster had to appear in some Warner Bros films of which this was one. Filming of Lancaster's next film, From Here to Eternity, had to be pushed back until Lancaster finished South Sea Woman.

Chuck Connors was cast as Lancaster's friend. This led to Connors retiring from baseball.

The movie was shot on the Warner Bros. backlot with some location work done on Catalina Island.

The movie was also known as Sulu Sea, South Sea Paradise and The Marines Have a Word for It before Warners decided on South Sea Woman.

== Reception ==
The New York Times reviewer Bosley Crowther was unimpressed, calling the film "a rip-snorting glorification of two United States Marines", with Lancaster doing his best "with all the muscle and charm at his command", but ultimately dismissing the effort as "a terrible lot of nonsense and, eventually, a fizzle as a show."

In 2019 Diabolique magazine wrote that the film "needed to be in colour but is highly spirited fun, which benefits from Lancaster at his toothy, swaggering best."

Lubin said the original title was General Court Martial and that South Sea Woman "was not at all appropriate. It had nothing to do with Virginia Mayo... I don't think it was very successful."

== See also ==
- 1953 in film
