= Always Leave Them Laughing =

1949 American film by Roy Del Ruth

- original theatrical poster
- Directed by: Roy Del Ruth
- Screenplay by: Melville Shavelson; Jack Rose "Fountain Pen Sketch" from Make Mine Manhattan: Arnold Horwit; Sylvia Rosales
- Story by: Max Shulman; Richard Mealand
- Produced by: Jerry Wald
- Starring: Milton Berle; Virginia Mayo
- Cinematography: Ernest Haller
- Edited by: Clarence Kolster
- Production company: Warner Bros. Pictures
- Distributed by: Warner Bros. Pictures
- Release date: November 26, 1949
- Running time: 116 minutes
- Country: United States
- Language: English
- Box office: $1.4 million

Always Leave Them Laughing is a 1949 American musical comedy-drama film directed by Roy Del Ruth and starring Milton Berle and Virginia Mayo.

== Plot ==
Comic Kip Cooper meets aspiring showgirl Fay Washburn at a second rate hotel in Asbury Park, New Jersey, where he does his unoriginal act in exchange for room and board. Kip gets a job as an emcee in a tough New York joint but he fails again. He takes a small part in the chorus of a Broadway show, but tells Fay and her ex-vaudevillian parents that he was cast as the lead. The Washburns attend on opening night and Kip, trying to stand out, does an impromptu gag that gets him fired.

Fay joins the chorus of big-time comedian Eddie Eagen's touring show. When Eagen is sidelined by a heart attack, Kip is hired to temporarily replace him, since he knows Eagen's routines by heart. Kip is a hit in the out of town tryouts, but also takes too much of an interest in his co-star, Nancy, who happens to be Eddie's beautiful and much younger wife. Eagen recovers and is scheduled to headline the show when it opens in New York. On his last night as the lead, Kip encourages Eagen to join him on stage for a song and dance routine. Eagen collapses and dies. Nancy offers Kip the chance to permanently step in for Eddie—on stage and off—but he rejects her and re-examines his life and career. Kip becomes a big TV star, but what he wants most is for Fay to take him back.

== Cast ==
- Milton Berle as Kipling Cooper
- Virginia Mayo as Nancy Eagen (singing voice dubbed by Bonnie Lou Williams)
- Ruth Roman as Fay Washburn (singing voice dubbed by Trudy Erwin)
- Bert Lahr as Eddie Eagen
- Alan Hale, Sr. as Sam Washburn
- Iris Adrian as Julie Adams
- Mary Castle as showgirl (uncredited)

== Production ==
This film, whose working title was "The Thief of Broadway", was originally intended for Danny Kaye. Berle, the most popular performer on television at the time, signed for $75,000 and a percentage of the profits. Berle had a reputation for stealing jokes, although he told The New York Times that it was he who started the rumor during a feud with comedian Richie Craig Jr. that was designed "to keep their names in the newspapers." Production began on July 18, 1949, when Berle's TV show was on hiatus. Audrey Meadows was tested for a lead role. Two sketches — "The Tank," where a fountain pen is demonstrated under water, and "Noises on the Street" — were purchased from the 1948 Broadway revue "Make Mine Manhattan" for the film. The film wrapped in mid-September and prepared for a mid-November release date.

== Reception ==
The Hollywood Reporter called the film "the comedy riot of year," and said Berle's "slapstick is superb, and the serious moments show fine acting style." Variety thought the "laugh sequences all click with the exception of the fountain pen sketch." However, Bosley Crowther of The New York Times complained that the producers have "latched onto a comic who, for all his bow-wow on TV, was never regarded or displayed as a screen performer of class. Nor even of charm, for that matter." Crowther thought that the film "shows no more originality than one of Mr. Berle's adopted gags. The people who wrote the screenplay must have subjected their brains to the lowest rate of taxation that has been put upon brains in years." Crowther summed up, "television (and Mr. Berle) should be left to homes and bars." Newsweek said that Bert Lahr, "even in his relatively small part...succeeds in pointing out the difference between comic genius of the old school and Berle's ubiquitous but largely imitative talent."
