= Liza (All the Clouds'll Roll Away) =

Song by Ruby Keeler (stage versions feature Duke Ellington Orchestra)
- Recorded: 1929
- Genre: Jazz standard, instrumental
- Composer: George Gershwin
- Lyricists: Ira Gershwin, Gus Kahn

Liza (All the Clouds'll Roll Away)" is a song composed by George Gershwin with lyrics by Ira Gershwin and Gus Kahn. It was introduced in 1929 by Ruby Keeler (as Dixie Dugan) in Florenz Ziegfeld's musical Show Girl. The stage performances were accompanied by the Duke Ellington Orchestra. On the show's opening night in Boston on June 25, 1929, Keeler's husband and popular singer Al Jolson suddenly stood up from his seat in the third row and sang a chorus of the song, much to the surprise of the audience and Gershwin himself. Jolson recorded the song a few days later on July 6, 1929, and his rendition rose to number nine on the charts of the day.

== Other notable recordings ==
A popular jazz standard, the song has been recorded by:

- Ipana Troubadors, vocal by Smith Ballew, recorded July 9, 1929 for Columbia Records (catalog No. 1903D).
- Leo Reisman and His Orchestra, recorded July 9, 1929 for Victor Records (catalog No. 22069A).
- Fletcher Henderson and His Orchestra - recorded on September 25, 1934 for Decca Records (catalog No. 555).
- Art Tatum Swingsters - recorded on October 9, 1934 for Decca Records (catalog No. 1373).
- Teddy Wilson - a single release on the Brunswick label in 1935.
- Benny Goodman Quartet, recorded August 2, 1937 for Victor Records (catalog No. 25660).
- Chick Webb and His Orchestra - recorded on May 3, 1938 for Decca Records (catalog No. 1840).
- Paul Whiteman Swinging Strings - recorded on November 15, 1938 for Decca Records (catalog No. 2223).
- Frankie Carle and His Orchestra, recorded April 2, 1942 for Columbia Records (catalog No. 36689).
- Django Reinhardt and Stéphane Grappelli - recorded together in 1943, included in Bioshock's Licensed Soundtrack (2007).
- Ethel Smith - recorded on October 24, 1944 for Decca Records (catalog No. 23426).
- The Quintet of the Hot Club of France, featuring Django Reinhardt - recorded January 2, 1946 for Decca Records.
- Al Jolson - he recorded it again on June 11, 1947.
- Bing Crosby - recorded May 21, 1954 with John Scott Trotter and His Orchestra.
- Thelonious Monk - included in his album The Unique Thelonious Monk (1956) and again in Monk (1964).
- The Four Freshmen - included in their album Four Freshmen and Five Saxes (1957).
- Chet Atkins - on Finger Style Guitar (1957).
- Judy Garland - a 1963 TV version included in the album The Show That Got Away (2002).
- Bobby Darin - included in his album Bobby Darin Sings The Shadow of Your Smile (1966).
- Herbie Hancock and Chick Corea - on album An Evening with Herbie Hancock & Chick Corea: In Concert - recorded February 1978 for Columbia Records (catalog No. 35663).
- Michael Feinstein - for his album Pure Gershwin (1987).
- Mel Tormé - for his album Velvet & Brass (1995).

== Film appearances ==
- 1945 Rhapsody in Blue
- 1945 George White's Scandals - performed on the Hammond B3 Organ by Ethel Smith.
- 1946 The Jolson Story - sung by Larry Parks (dubbed by Al Jolson), danced by Evelyn Keyes.
- 1946 The Big Sleep - heard outside Eddie Mars' house
- 1947 The Man I Love - played by San on the piano when Petey calls the Bamboo Club.
- 1951 An American in Paris
- 1951 Starlift - sung and danced by Patrice Wymore (singing dubbed by Bonnie Lou Williams)

== In popular culture ==
The song is the namesake of Liza Minnelli, who performed the number at her 2008-9 concert Liza's at The Palace...!. It is also included in the 2015 Broadway musical An American in Paris, a joke on the mispronunciation of "Lise" - the female lead's name - by the American Jerry Mulligan.

Django Reinhardt and Stephane Grappeli's licensed version appears as a song in Bioshock (2007). Players will hear it upon activating a jukebox in the level, and will hear its notable tune during the Farmer's Market section. Featured in-game, the song has been slowed down whilst the original recording is played at slightly faster speed.

== See also ==
- List of 1920s jazz standards
