= Gordon MacRae =

American actor, singer, and television and radio host (1921–1986)

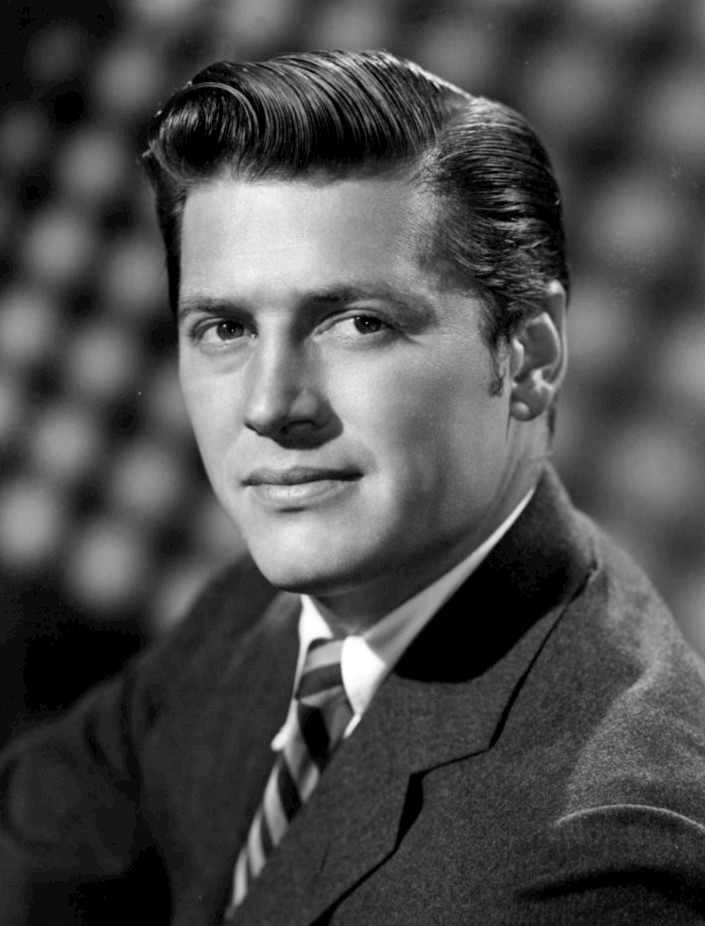
- MacRae in 1953
- Born: Albert Gordon MacRae; March 12, 1921; East Orange, New Jersey, U.S.
- Died: January 24, 1986 (aged 64); Lincoln, Nebraska, U.S.
- Resting place: Wyuka Cemetery, Lincoln, Nebraska
- Occupations: Actor; singer; television and radio show host
- Years active: 1939–1980
- Spouses: Sheila MacRae (m. 1941; div. 1967) Elizabeth Lambert Schrafft (m. 1967)
- Children: 5, including Heather and Meredith

Albert Gordon MacRae (March 12, 1921 – January 24, 1986) was an American actor, singer, and television and radio host. He appeared in the film versions of two Rodgers and Hammerstein musicals, Oklahoma! (1955) and Carousel (1956), and played the leading man opposite Doris Day in On Moonlight Bay (1951) and its sequel, By The Light of the Silvery Moon (1953).

== Early life ==
Albert Gordon MacRae was born on March 12, 1921, in East Orange, New Jersey. His father, William LaMont MacRae, was a toolmaker and radio singer. His mother, Helen Violet Sonn, was a concert pianist. His father was descended from Clan MacRae. MacRae attended Nottingham High School in Syracuse, New York, where he was active in the Drama Club. He later attended and graduated in 1940 from Deerfield Academy in Deerfield, Massachusetts, and thereafter served as a navigator in IX Troop Carrier Command in the United States Army Air Forces during World War II.

== Career ==
=== Singer ===
MacRae was a baritone. Winning a contest enabled him to sing at the 1939 New York World's Fair with the Harry James and Les Brown orchestras.

=== Broadway ===
He made his Broadway debut in 1942, acquiring his first recording contract soon afterwards. Many of his recordings were made with Jo Stafford.

=== Radio ===
On the radio in 1945, his talents were showcased on the Gordon MacRae Show on the CBS network in collaboration with the conductor Archie Bleyer. In 1946, his fifteen-minute variety show Skyline Roof also featured emerging musical talent, including the accordionist John Serry Sr. MacRae was also the host and lead actor on The Railroad Hour, a half-hour anthology series made up of condensed versions of hit Broadway musicals. The programs were later released as popular studio cast albums, most of which have been reissued on CD.

In 1946, he was in the revue Three to Make Ready, which ran for 326 performances.

=== Film ===
MacRae signed a contract with Warner Bros. in 1947. In 1948, he appeared in his first film, The Big Punch, a drama about boxing. He followed this with a film noir with Virginia Mayo, Backfire (made in 1948, released 1950).

MacRae's first on-screen musical was Look for the Silver Lining (1949), a biopic of Marilyn Miller (June Haver), where MacRae played Frank Carter. David Butler directed. MacRae was reunited with Haver and Butler in The Daughter of Rosie O'Grady (1950). Warners put him in a Western, Return of the Frontiersman (1950). Then he starred with Doris Day in Tea for Two (1950), a reworking of No, No, Nanette, also for Butler. Public response was enthusiastic. MacRae and Day were teamed again in The West Point Story (1950) starring James Cagney and Mayo, On Moonlight Bay (1951), and the all-star Korean War tribute, Starlift (1951).

MacRae was in a military school musical, About Face (1952) with Eddie Bracken, then he and Day did a sequel to On Moonlight Bay, By the Light of the Silvery Moon (1953). That same year, he starred opposite Kathryn Grayson in the third film version of The Desert Song and teamed with Jane Powell in Three Sailors and a Girl (1953). MacRae's best known film role was Curly in the big screen adaptation of Oklahoma! (1955) alongside Shirley Jones. He and Jones were used on another Rodgers and Hammerstein adaptation, Carousel (1956), at 20th Century Fox (now 20th Century Studios). MacRae played Buddy De Sylva in The Best Things in Life Are Free (1956) for 20th Century-Fox.

=== Television ===
MacRae was host and singer on The Gordon MacRae Show on NBC in 1956. He appeared frequently on television, on such variety programs as The Ford Show, Starring Tennessee Ernie Ford. He also appeared on drama shows such as Lux Video Theatre.

During Christmas 1958, MacRae and Ford performed the Christmas hymn "O Holy Night". Earlier in 1958, MacRae guest-starred on the short-lived NBC variety series The Polly Bergen Show.

He starred in the television musical The Gift of the Magi (1958). Thereafter, MacRae appeared on The Ed Sullivan Show, The Dinah Shore Chevy Show, The Pat Boone Chevy Showroom, and The Bell Telephone Hour.

=== Later career ===
MacRae guest starred on McCloud. He had supporting roles in the films Zero to Sixty (1978) and The Pilot (1980).

== Personal life and death ==
MacRae was married to Sheila MacRae from 1941 until 1967. They met on the set of a play and it was "love at first sight." The couple were the parents of four children, including actresses Heather and Meredith MacRae. Sheila later married television producer Ronald Wayne.

MacRae's second marriage was to Elizabeth Lambert Schrafft on September 25, 1967, and together they had one daughter. They remained married until his death. He was an alcoholic for many years, but he overcame the addiction by the late 1970s.

MacRae had cancer of the mouth and jaw. He died in 1986 of pneumonia, at a hospital in Lincoln, Nebraska, aged 64. He was buried at the Wyuka Cemetery in Lincoln, Nebraska.

== Filmography ==
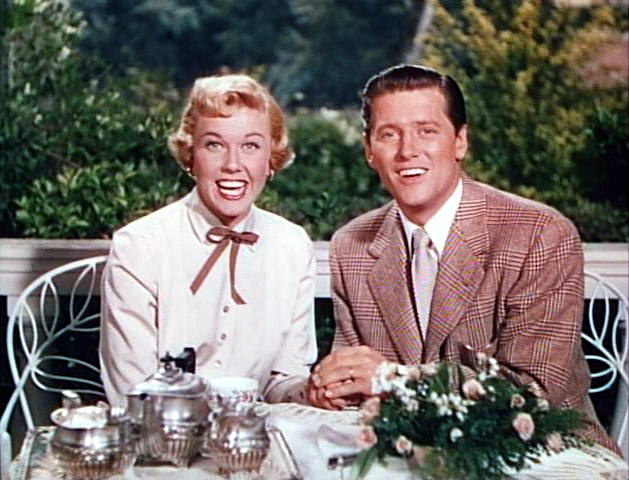
MacRae with Doris Day in Tea for Two (1950)

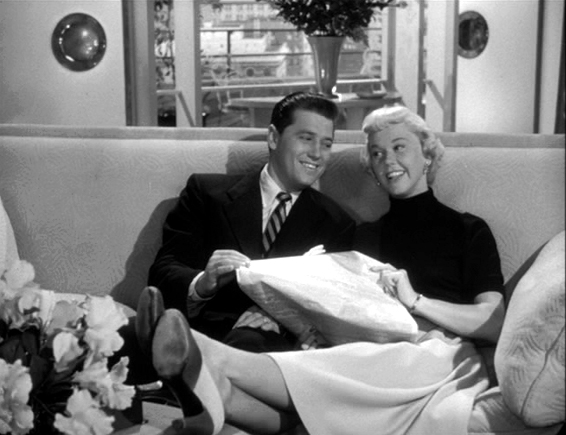
MacRae with Day in Starlift (1951)

Feature films
Year	Title	Role	Notes
1948	The Big Punch	Johnny Grant	
1949	Look for the Silver Lining	Frank Carter	
1950	Backfire	Bob Corey	
1950	The Daughter of Rosie O'Grady	Tony Pastor	
1950	Return of the Frontiersman	Logan Barrett	
1950	Tea for Two	Jimmy Smith	
1950	The West Point Story	Tom Fletcher	
1951	On Moonlight Bay	William Sherman	
1951	Starlift	Himself	
1952	About Face	Tony Williams	
1953	By the Light of the Silvery Moon	William Sherman	
1953	The Desert Song	El Khobar / Paul Bonnard	
1953	Three Sailors and a Girl	"Choirboy" Jones	
1955	Oklahoma!	Curly McLain	
1956	Carousel	Billy Bigelow	
1956	The Best Things in Life Are Free	Buddy DeSylva	
1978	Zero to Sixty	Officer Joe	
1980	The Pilot	Joe Barnes	(final film role)

Short subjects
Year	Title	Role	Notes
1951	The Screen Director	Himself	
1952	Screen Snapshots: Fun in the Sun	Himself	
1953	So You Want a Television Set	Himself	

== Stage work ==
- Junior Miss (1942, Broadway, replacement for Walter Collins)
- Three to Make Ready (1946, Broadway)
- Carousel (1955, Music Hall at Fair Park)
- Annie Get Your Gun (1960, Starlight Theatre)
- Bells Are Ringing (1961, Columbus, Ohio)
- Guys and Dolls (1963, summer stock tour)
- Bells Are Ringing (1964, summer stock tour)
- Jerome Kern's Theatre (1966, Avery Fisher Hall)
- Kismet (1966, Columbus, Ohio)
- Oklahoma! (1967, summer stock tour)
- I Do! I Do! (1967, Broadway, replacement for Robert Preston)
- Golden Rainbow (1969, summer stock tour)
- Milk and Honey (1972, Columbus, Ohio)
- Paint Your Wagon (1978, Columbus, Ohio)

== Radio ==
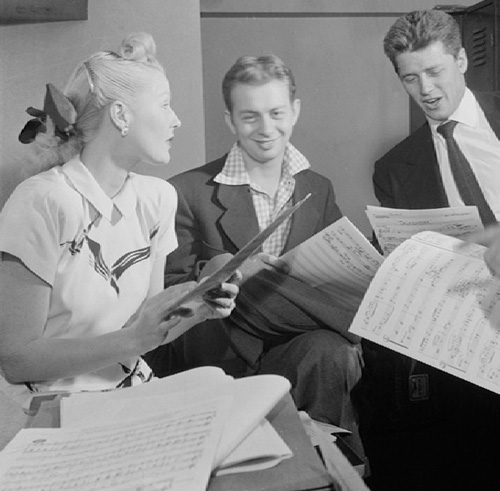
Marion Hutton, Mel Tormé and MacRae on The Teentimers Club radio show (1947)

MacRae replaced Frank Sinatra on a radio program in 1943, but he soon had to leave for military service. In 1946, he was the "singing emcee" of The Teentimers Club, a Saturday morning program. From 1945 to 1948 he also hosted and performed on The Gordon MacRae Show for the CBS radio network.

He also appeared in programs as shown in the table below.

Program	Episode	Date	Notes
Stars in the Air	Christmas in Connecticut	March 20, 1952	
Lux Radio Theatre	On Moonlight Bay	May 5, 1952	

== Discography ==
=== Solo albums ===
- Gordon MacRae Sings (1950)
- Gordon MacRae Sings with Walter Gross’ Orchestra (1952)
- Gordon MacRae Sings Operetta Favorites (1955)
- Romantic Ballads (1955)
- The Best Things in Life Are Free (1956)
- Cowboy's Lament (1957)
- Motion Picture Soundstage (1957)
- This Is Gordon MacRae (1958)
- Gordon MacRae in Concert (1958)
- The Seasons of Love (1959)
- Songs for an Evening at Home (1959)
- Our Love Story (1960)
- Hallowed Be Thy Name (1961)
- If She Walked Into My Life (1966)
- Only Love (1969)

=== Albums with Jo Stafford ===
- Kiss Me Kate (1949)
- Sunday Evening Songs (1950)
- Memory Songs (1956)
- Whispering Hope (1962)
- There's Peace in the Valley (1963)

=== Singles ===
Year	Single	Chart positions
Year	Single	Hot 100
1945	"You Go to My Head" b/w "'A' You're Adorable"	-
1945	"It's Anybody's Spring" b/w "Love Is the Sweetest Thing"	-
1947	"I Still Get Jealous" b/w "I Understand"	25
1947	"At the Candlelight Cafe" b/w "I Surrender Dear"	20
1948	"Thoughtless"	28
1948	"You Were Meant for Me"	22
1948	"That Feathery Feeling" b/w "Matinee"	27
1948	"It's Magic" b/w "Spring in December"	9
1948	"Steppin' Out with My Baby" b/w "Evelyn"	-
1948	"Hankerin'" b/w "I Went Down to Virginia"	23
1948	"Win or Lose" b/w "At Your Command"	-
1948	"Hair of Gold, Eyes of Blue"	7
1948	"Rambling Rose"	27
1948	"Say Something Sweet to Your Sweetheart" (with Jo Stafford)	10
1948	"Bluebird of Happiness" (with Jo Stafford)	16
1948	"My Darling, My Darling" b/w "Girls Were Made to Take Care of Boys"; Both sides with Jo Stafford and The Starlighters	1
1949	"Down the Lane" b/w "You Are My Love"; Both sides with Jo Stafford and The Jud Conlon Singers	-
1949	"N'Yot N'Yow (The Pussycat Song)" b/w "I'll String Along with You"; Both sides with Jo Stafford	26
1949	"So in Love" b/w "A Rosewood Spinet"	20
1949	"You're Still the Belle of the Ball" b/w "The Melancholy Minstrel"	-
1949	"'A' You're Adorable" (with Jo Stafford)	4
1949	"Need You" (with Jo Stafford)	7
1949	"Some Enchanted Evening" b/w (B-side by Margaret Whiting: "A Wonderful Guy")	-
1949	"Younger Than Springtime" b/w(B-side by Margaret Whiting: "A Cock-Eyed Optimist)	30
1949	"Whispering Hope" b/w "A Thought in My Heart"; Both sides with Jo Stafford	4
1949	"Thank You" b/w "My One and Only Highland Fling"; Both sides with The Starlighters	-
1949	"The Wedding of Lilli Marlene" b/w "Twenty-Four Hours of Sunshine"; Both sides with The Starlighters	-
1949	"I Want You to Want Me (to Want You)" b/w "Wonderful One"	-
1949	"Wunderbar" b/w "I'll String Along with You"; Both sides with Jo Stafford	-
1949	"Mule Train"	14
1949	"Dear Hearts and Gentle People"	19
1949	"Bibbidi-Bobbidi-Boo" (with Jo Stafford)	13
1949	"Echoes" (with Jo Stafford)	18
1949	"The Sunshine of Your Smile" b/w "Body and Soul"	-
1950	"Adeste Fideles" b/w "Merry Christmas Waltz"; Both sides with Jo Stafford	-
1950	"Songs of Christmas" (Part 1) b/w "Songs of Christmas" (Part 2); Both sides with Jo Stafford	-
1950	"Love's Old Sweet Song" b/w "Juanita"; Both sides with Jo Stafford	-
1950	"Dearie" b/w "Monday, Tuesday, Wednesday (I Love You)"; Both sides with Jo Stafford	10
1950	"Beyond the Sunset" b/w "Near Me"; Both sides with Jo Stafford	-
1950	"Where Are You Gonna Be When the Moon Shines" b/w "Driftin' Down the Dreamy Ol' Ohio"; Both sides with Jo Stafford	-
1950	"A Perfect Day" b/w "The Rosary"; Both sides with Jo Stafford	-
1950	"I'm in the Middle of a Riddle" b/w "Tea for Two"; Both sides with Jo Stafford	-
1951	"Love Means Love" (with The Ewing Sisters) b/w "Wait For Me"	-
1951	"Whispering Hope" (Reissue) b/w "I'll String Along with You"	-
1951	"Wunderbar" b/w "Beyond the Sunset"; Both sides with Jo Stafford	-
1951	"Ol' Man River" b/w "On a Sunday at Coney Island"	-
1951	"Down the Old Ox Road" b/w "Cuddle Up a Little Closer"	-
1951	"Cuban Love Song" b/w "Last Night When We Were Young" (with Jo Stafford)	-
1951	"On Rosary Hill" b/w "Lover's Waltz"; Both sides with Gisele MacKenzie	-
1951	"Be My Girl" b/w "Laughing at Love"	-
1952	"When It's Springtime in the Rockies" b/w "Nights of Splendor"; Both sides with Jo Stafford	-
1952	"My Love" b/w "How Close"	-
1952	"Green Acres and Purple Mountains" b/w "Baby Doll"	-
1952	"These Things Shall Pass" b/w "Gentle Hands"	-
1952	"Brotherly Love" b/w "Straight and Narrow"	-
1953	"How Do You Speak to an Angel"	30
1953	"Congratulations to Someone"	28
1953	"C'est Magnifique" b/w "Homin' Time"	29
1953	"Stranger in Paradise" b/w "Never in a Million Years"	29
1953	"I Don't Want to Walk Without You" b/w "I Still Dream of You"	-
1954	"Ramona" b/w "So in Love"	-
1954	"Face to Face" b/w "Backward, Turn Backward"	30
1954	"Cara Mia" b/w "Count Your Blessings Instead of Sheep"	-
1954	"Here's What I'm Here For" b/w "Love Can Change the Stars"	-
1955	"You Forgot (to Tell Me That You Love Me)" b/w "Tik-A-Tee Tik-A-Tay"	-
1955	"Follow Your Heart" b/w "Bella Notte"	-
1955	"Why Break the Heart That Loves You" b/w "Jim Bowie"	-
1955	"The Surrey with the Fringe on Top" b/w "People Will Say We're in Love"; Both sides with Ray Anthony	-
1955	"A Woman in Love" b/w "Wonderful Christmas"	-
1955	"Never Before and Never Again" b/w "Fate"	-
1956	"I've Grown Accustomed to Her Face" b/w "Who Are We"	96
1956	"I Asked the Lord" b/w "One Misty Morning"	-
1956	"Obey" b/w "Without Love"	-
1956	"Endless Love" b/w "When You Kiss Me"	-
1957	"Till We Meet Again" b/w "Lonely"	-
1957	"Sayonara" b/w "Never Till Now"	-
1958	"If I Forget You" b/w "Now"	-
1958	"The Secret" b/w "A Man Once Said"	18
1958	"Fly Little Bluebird" b/w "Little Do You Know"	-
1959	"The Stranger" b/w "Palace of Love"	-
1959	"The Sound of Music" b/w "When Did I Fall in Love"	-
1960	"You Were There" b/w "Our Love Story" (with Sheila MacRae)	-
1960	"If Ever I Would Leave You" b/w "Dolce Far Niente"	-
1961	"Face to Face" b/w "Sail Away"	-
1961	"Ordinary People" b/w "Impossible"	-
1962	"The Sweetest Sounds" b/w "Nobody Told Me"	-
1962	"Lovely" b/w "Warmer Than a Whisper"	-
1966	"If She Walked into My Life" b/w "I Want to Be with You"	-
1966	"All" b/w "I Don't Think I'm in Love"	-
1968	"Only Love" b/w "Knowing When to Leave"	-
