= Bold Journey =

American travelogue program (1956–1959)

- Genre: Travel
- Presented by: John Stephenson; Jack Douglas
- Country of origin: United States
- Original language: English

Original release
- Network: ABC
- Release: July 16, 1956 – August 31, 1959

Bold Journey is a travelogue program broadcast by ABC television in the United States from July 16, 1956, until August 31, 1959.

Bold Journey consisted of films taken by explorers and adventurers during their travels to remote parts of the world. The films were usually set up by an interview between a program host and the guest, who then narrated his film with the aid of helpful questions from the host. The initial host was John Stephenson; Jack Douglas became host effective with the October 28, 1957 broadcast.

Bold Journey was initially shown on Mondays from 7:30 to 8 p.m. Eastern Time. In February 1957 it was moved to Thursdays from 9:30 to 10 p.m. E. T. In June 1957 it was moved to Mondays from 8:30 to 9 p.m. E. T., remaining in that time slot until it went off the air.

Initially, Bold Journey was scheduled against The Gordon MacRae Show on NBC and Arthur Godfrey's Talent Scouts on CBS. The next fall, while Bold Journey remained opposite Wells Fargo on NBC, its new competition from CBS in its time slot was Father Knows Best. Bold Journey became one of the lowest-rated prime time programs of its era, but managed to remain on the air as long as it did due to its very low production costs relative to scripted programs, which was an important factor to ABC, which in that era had a considerably smaller budget than the other two U.S. commercial television networks. However, in the fall of 1959, ABC decided to forgo this approach and attempt to compete directly for viewers with the other networks in this time slot, and Bold Journey was replaced by one of the most expensively produced series of the era, Warner Bros.' Cheyenne.
