= Tea for Two (film) =

1950 film by David Butler

- Theatrical release poster
- Directed by: David Butler
- Screenplay by: Harry Clork
- Produced by: William Jacobs
- Starring: Doris Day; Gordon MacRae; Gene Nelson; Patrice Wymore; Eve Arden; Billy De Wolfe; S. Z. Sakall
- Cinematography: Wilfred M. Cline
- Edited by: Irene Morra
- Music by: Ray Heindorf
- Production company: Warner Bros.
- Distributed by: Warner Bros.
- Release date: September 2, 1950
- Running time: 98 minutes
- Country: United States
- Language: English
- Budget: $1.1 million
- Box office: $3.6 million $2.4 million (US rentals)

Tea for Two is a 1950 American musical romantic comedy film directed by David Butler and starring Doris Day and Gordon MacRae, with Gene Nelson, Patrice Wymore, Eve Arden, Billy De Wolfe, and S. Z. Sakall in supporting roles. The screenplay by Harry Clork was inspired by the 1925 stage musical No, No, Nanette, although the plot was changed considerably from the original book by Otto Harbach and Frank Mandel; and the score by Harbach, Irving Caesar, and Vincent Youmans was augmented with songs by other composers.

The film follows a socialite in the Roaring Twenties who bets her uncle $25,000 that she can say "no" to everything for 48 hours, intending to invest the money in a Broadway show featuring songs by her beau, though she is unaware that her uncle has lost her fortune in the Wall Street crash of 1929.

== Plot ==
In New York City, teenagers Lynne and Richard Smith dress up in their absent parents' clothes from the 1920s for the amusement of their friends until their great-uncle, J. Maxwell "Max" Bloomhaus, comes home and berates them for making fun of their parents. He then proceeds to recount stories from their parents' youth in the Roaring Twenties.

In 1929, Max guards the fortune of his niece Nanette Carter, a socialite with show business aspirations who is taking singing and dancing lessons from her friends, composer Jimmy Smith and dancer Tommy Trainor. Due to Max's bad investments, Nanette's fortune is lost in the stock market crash. She is being hounded by her on-and-off boyfriend, theatrical producer Larry Blair, to invest $25,000 in a new Broadway show in which Jimmy and Tommy have major roles, believing she is one of the few remaining wealthy people he knows, but she declines.

Determined to persuade Nanette, Larry brings Jimmy and Tommy to her estate in Westchester, New York, and lies that Jimmy needs the money to pay for his sister's operation. Nanette agrees to finance the show, and Jimmy suggests that Nanette play the lead role, replacing actress Beatrice Darcy. That night, Nanette, unaware that she is broke, asks Max the money to invest in Larry's show. When he refuses, Nanette bets her uncle $25,000 that she can say "no" to every question she is asked for the next 48 hours, with her wisecracking secretary, Pauline Hastings, ensuring that Nanette will keep her end of the bargain.

Nanette invites the entire cast to rehearse at her estate over the weekend. When Jimmy, who is romantically interested in Nanette, asks her if her engagement to Larry is definitive, she answers "no". Larry is having an affair with Beatrice, but neglected to inform her that Nanette has taken over the lead role. Upon learning of the switch in parts, Beatrice arrives unexpectedly at the estate to confront Nanette and Larry. To make Nanette lose the bet, Max forces her to deny that she wants to star in the play. Jimmy is confused by Nanette's odd behavior, but she tells him that she is committed to investing in the show despite Larry's deceit, and the two kiss.

The next day, Max encourages Jimmy to propose to Nanette, but she is forced to say "no" even though she loves Jimmy, prompting him to leave. Nanette wins the bet, but Max's lawyer, William Early, arrives and reveals that her uncle lost all her money in the crash. Larry hands over the show to Tommy, who suggests they raise the money themselves. Pauline charms William into backing the show, now titled No, No, Nanette, and it is a rousing success. Pauline and William get married, as do Nanette and Jimmy.

In the present day, Max finishes his story just before Nanette and Jimmy return home to their two children.

== Cast ==
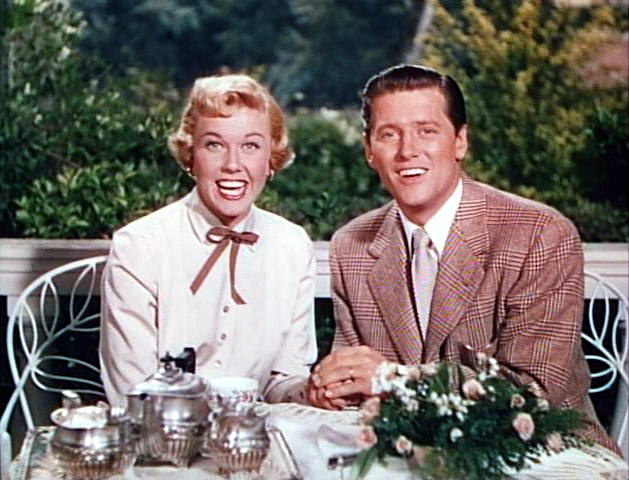
Doris Day and Gordon MacRae as Nanette Carter and Jimmy Smith

- Doris Day as Nanette Carter
- Gordon MacRae as Jimmy Smith
- Gene Nelson as Tommy Trainor
- Eve Arden as Pauline Hastings
- Billy De Wolfe as Larry Blair
- S. Z. Sakall as J. Maxwell Bloomhaus
- Bill Goodwin as William Early
- Patrice Wymore as Beatrice Darcy
- Virginia Gibson as Mabel Wiley

== Soundtrack ==
- "I Know That You Know" – sung by Doris Day and Gene Nelson
- "Crazy Rhythm" – sung by Patrice Wymore and Gene Nelson
- "I Only Have Eyes for You" – sung by Gordon MacRae
- "Tea for Two" – sung by Doris Day and Gordon MacRae
- "I Want to Be Happy" – sung by Doris Day and Gordon MacRae
- "Do Do Do" – sung by Doris Day and Gordon MacRae
- "Oh Me! Oh My!" – sung by Doris Day and Gene Nelson
- "Charleston" – danced to by Billy De Wolfe
- "Tea for Two (Reprise)" – sung by Doris Day and Gene Nelson
- "Here in My Arms" – sung by Doris Day
- "No, No, Nanette" – sung by Doris Day and Gene Nelson
- "Tea for Two (Finale)" – sung by Doris Day and Gordon MacRae

== Production ==
The film was the first in which Doris Day received top billing and marked the first time she danced on-screen.

This was director Butler and leading lady Day's second collaboration, following It's a Great Feeling the previous year. The two went on to work together on Lullaby of Broadway, April in Paris, By the Light of the Silvery Moon, and Calamity Jane.

Ray Heindorf served as musical director for the film, and the musical sequences were choreographed by Gene Nelson, Eddie Prinz, and LeRoy Prinz. Art direction was by Douglas Bacon and the costume designer was Leah Rhodes.

Both Gordon MacRae and Gene Nelson appeared together in the film version of Oklahoma! (1955).

== Reception ==
=== Box office ===
According to accounting records at Warner Bros., the film earned $2,322,000 in the United States and $1,330,000 internationally.

=== Critical response ===
In his review in The New York Times, Bosley Crowther called the film "pleasant entertainment," "a sprightly show," and "quite a genial production" and added, "Miss Day and Mr. MacRae . . . complement each other like peanut butter and jelly."

In a review published for Time, the critic expressed sentiments about Tea for Two, highlighting its nostalgic depiction of a bygone era characterized by vibrant colors, the fashion trend of plus fours, the era of prohibition, and the infamous stock-market crash. The storyline of the production was noted for its abundant utilization of well-known tropes commonly found in musical comedies. While acknowledging its predictable nature, the reviewer commended the production's ability to serve as enjoyable entertainment during warm weather. Particularly, the reviewer found the rendition of classic melodies by acclaimed composers Vincent Youmans, George Gershwin, and Roger Wolfe Kahn to be the most captivating aspect of Tea for Two.

=== Accolades ===
Gene Nelson won the Golden Globe Award for New Star of the Year – Actor for his work on Tea for Two.
