= Virginia Gibson =

American actress (1925–2013)

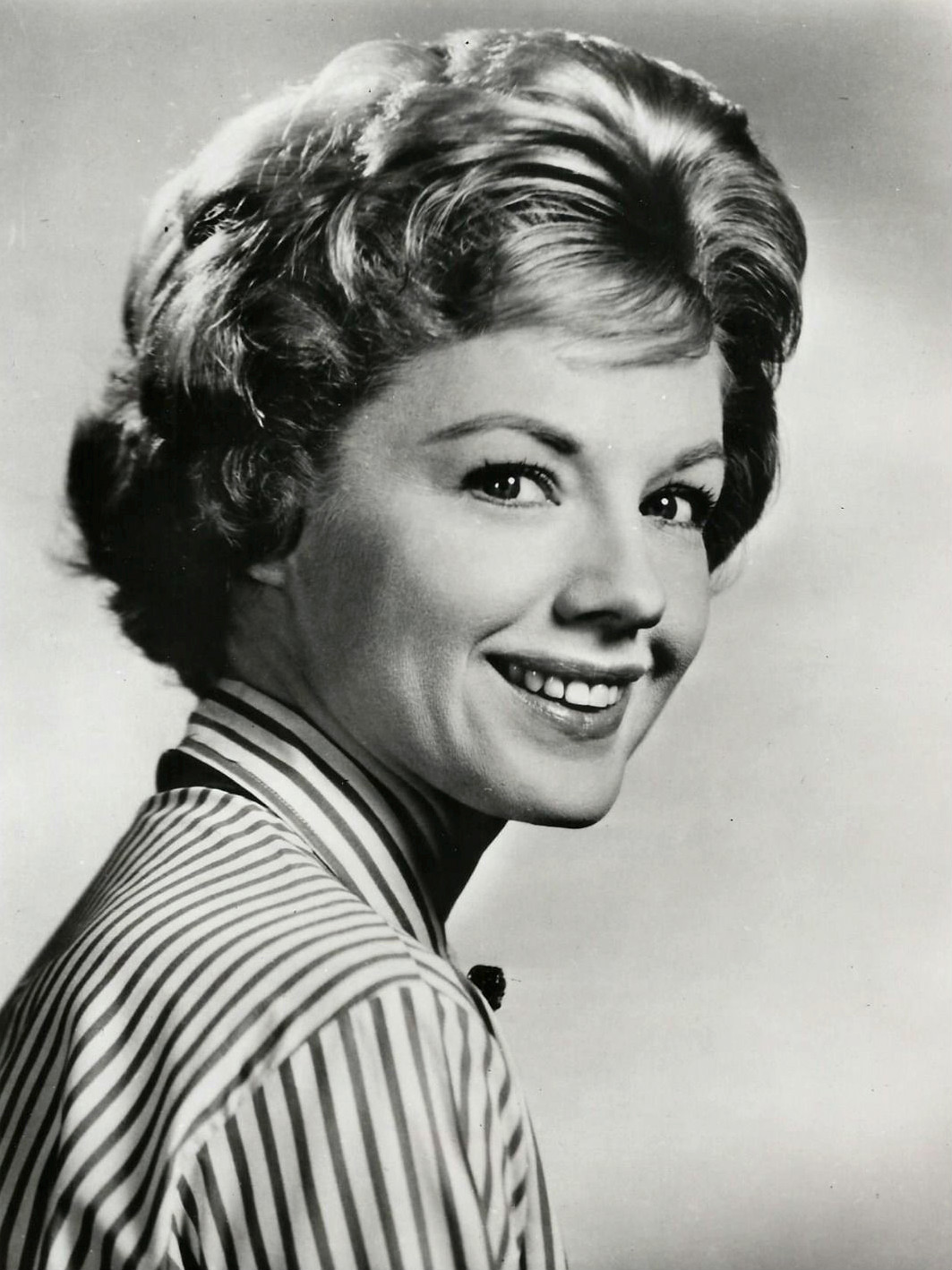
- Gibson in 1967
- Born: Virginia Gorski; April 9, 1925; St. Louis, Missouri, U.S.
- Died: April 25, 2013 (aged 88); Newtown, Bucks County, Pennsylvania, U.S.
- Occupations: Actress; dancer; singer
- Years active: 1937–1971
- Known for: Seven Brides for Seven Brothers; Tea for Two; Funny Face

Virginia Gibson (born Virginia Gorski; April 9, 1925 – April 25, 2013) was an American dancer, singer and actress of film, television and musical theater.

== Early years ==
Gibson was born on April 9, 1925 in St. Louis, Missouri. She was of Polish and Irish lineage and graduated from St. Alphonsus Parochial School.

== Career ==
Gibson started her career in musicals in her hometown of St. Louis. In 1937, she was one of 35 girls chosen for the St. Louis Opera Company's ballet productions. She danced in the chorus of a production of The Student Prince there in 1940, and in 1943 she was part of the dancing chorus of the summer season of the Muny Opera. In the fall of 1943, she was one of three dancers from that group to sign contracts to perform in Roll Up Your Sleeves on Broadway. She used her birth name on Broadway through 1949. In 1947, she returned to perform at the Muny Opera as the star of No, No, Nanette.

Gibson was signed by Warner Bros. in 1950 and made her film debut in Tea for Two (1950). Billed as a starlet, she was a member of a group of Hollywood actors who traveled across the country in 1951-1952 promoting the 50th anniversary of movie theaters. With Roscoe Ates and Charles Starrett, she toured eastern Oklahoma greeting the public. In Hollywood, she played supporting or leading roles in a number of Warner Bros. musicals. Her most famous film role was Liza in Seven Brides for Seven Brothers (1954). Warner Bros. elected to not renew her contract option. Gibson later said: "There are just so many musicals, and they had Doris Day. And who can shine in comparison to her vivacity?"

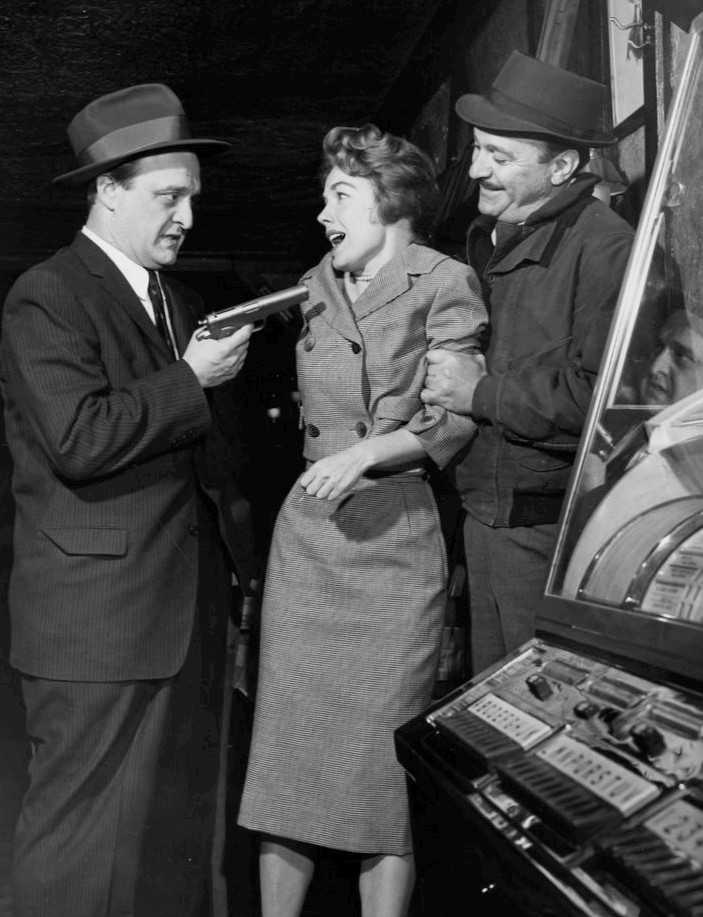
Vincent Gardenia, Gibson, and Val Avery in "Sound of Violence", a 1959 episode of the anthology series Armstrong Circle Theatre

On television, Gibson was a regular on Captain Billy's Showboat (1948). She also starred in So This Is Hollywood (1955). She was a regular performer on The Johnny Carson Show (1955–56). In 1956, she returned to Broadway to play Ethel Merman's daughter in the musical Happy Hunting. She then became one of the stars of Your Hit Parade, one of the most popular TV shows of the 1950s, for one season. She had a three-month stint as a jazz singer on the TV version of Young Doctor Malone. From 1962 to 1971, she cohosted (with Frank Buxton and later Bill Owen) the ABC-TV children's documentary program Discovery.

Gibson also appeared in commercials for cake mixes, cameras, candy bars, detergents and various soap products, hair sprays and paper towels.

When her performing career ended, Gibson taught at the HB Studio in New York.

== Personal life ==
Gibson never married or had any children.

== Death ==
On April 25, 2013, Gibson died in Newtown, Pennsylvania at the age of 88.

== Awards ==
In 1957, Gibson was nominated for a Tony Award for Best Featured Actress in a Musical for her portrayal of Beth Livingstone in Happy Hunting.

== Theatrical appearances ==
- A Connecticut Yankee (Dancing Girl), 1943–44, Martin Beck Theater, New York
- Laffing Room Only (Dancer). 1944-45, Winter Garden Theater, New York
- Billion Dollar Baby (Chorine, Dancer), 1945–46, Alvin Theater, New York
- No, No, Nanette (Nanette), 1947, St. Louis Municipal Opera
- Babes in Toyland (Jill), 1947, St. Louis Municipal Opera
- High Button Shoes (corps de ballet), 1947, New Century Theatre, New York
- Look, Ma, I'm Dancin'! (Snow White), 1948, Adelphi Theatre, New York
- Along Fifth Avenue (Singer, dancer), 1949, Broadhurst Theatre, New York
- Bitter Sweet (Dolly), 1949, St. Louis Municipal Opera
- Bloomer Girl (Daisy), 1949, St. Louis Municipal Opera
- Irene (Helen), 1949, St. Louis Municipal Opera
- The Vagabond King (Lady Mary), 1949, St. Louis Municipal Opera
- The New Moon (Julie), 1949, St. Louis Municipal Opera
- Whoopee! (Harriet Underwood), 1950, St. Louis Municipal Opera
- The Great Waltz (lead dancer) 1953, Los Angeles Civic Light Opera and San Francisco Light Opera
- Happy Hunting (Beth Livingstone), 1956–57, Majestic Theatre, New York

== Filmography ==
- Tea for Two, Warner Bros., 1950
- Painting the Clouds With Sunshine, Warner Bros., 1951
- Goodbye, My Fancy, Warner Bros., 1951
- The Miracle of Our Lady of Fatima, Warner Bros., 1952 (uncredited)
- About Face, Warner Bros., 1952
- Stop, You're Killing Me, Warner Bros., 1952
- She's Back on Broadway, Warner Bros., 1953
- Seven Brides for Seven Brothers, MGM, 1954
- Athena, MGM, 1954
- I Killed Wild Bill Hickok, The Wheeler Company, 1956
- Once Upon a Honeymoon (Short), Jerry Fairbanks Productions, 1956
- Funny Face, Paramount Pictures, 1957
