= Virginia Mayo =

American actress (1920–2005)

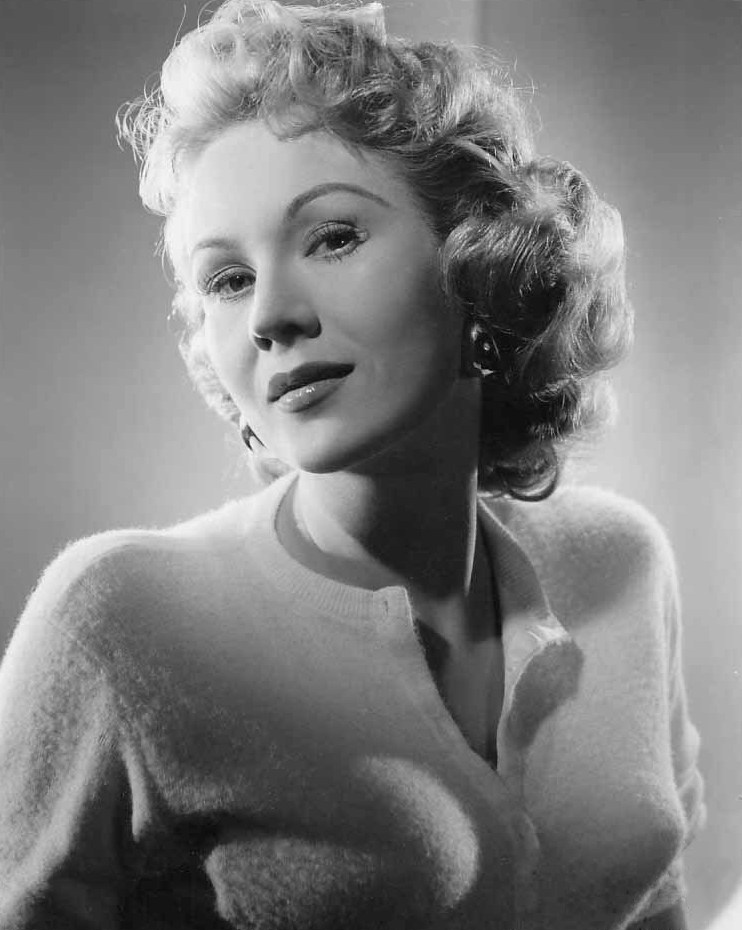
- Mayo c. 1950
- Born: Virginia Clara Jones; November 30, 1920; St. Louis, Missouri, U.S.
- Died: January 17, 2005 (aged 84); Los Angeles, California, U.S.
- Resting place: Valley Oaks Memorial Park
- Occupation: Actress
- Years active: 1937–1997
- Spouse: Michael O'Shea (m. 1947; died 1973)
- Children: 1

Virginia Mayo (born Virginia Clara Jones; November 30, 1920 – January 17, 2005) was an American actress. She was in a series of popular comedy films with Danny Kaye and was Warner Bros.' biggest box-office draw in the late 1940s. She is also known for her roles in the war drama The Best Years of Our Lives (1946), the film noir White Heat (1949), and the war adventure Captain Horatio Hornblower (1951).

== Biography ==
=== Early life ===
Mayo was born in St. Louis, Missouri, the daughter of newspaper reporter Luke and his wife, Martha Henrietta (née Rautenstrauch) Jones. Her family had roots back to the earliest days of St. Louis, including great-great-great-grandfather Captain James Piggott, who founded East St. Louis, Illinois, in 1797. Virginia's aunt operated an acting school in the St. Louis area, which Virginia began attending at age six. She also had a series of dancing instructors engaged by her aunt.

=== Vaudeville ===
Following her graduation from Soldan High School at age 16 in 1937, Virginia landed her first professional acting and dancing jobs at the St. Louis Municipal Opera Theatre (more commonly known as "The Muny") and in an act with six other girls at the Hotel Jefferson. Performer Andy Mayo, impressed with her ability, recruited her to appear in his act, "Morton and Mayo".

She toured the American vaudeville circuit for three years, serving as ringmaster and comedic foil for "Pansy the Horse," performed by Andy Mayo and his partner, Nonnie Morton, in a horse suit. They appeared together in some short films and were a huge hit in New York at Billy Rose's Diamond Horseshoe nightclub in the Broadway theater district, where she was spotted by Samuel Goldwyn.

=== Broadway ===
In 1941, then known by her stage name Virginia Mayo, she got another career break when she appeared on Broadway with Eddie Cantor in Banjo Eyes.

=== Sam Goldwyn ===
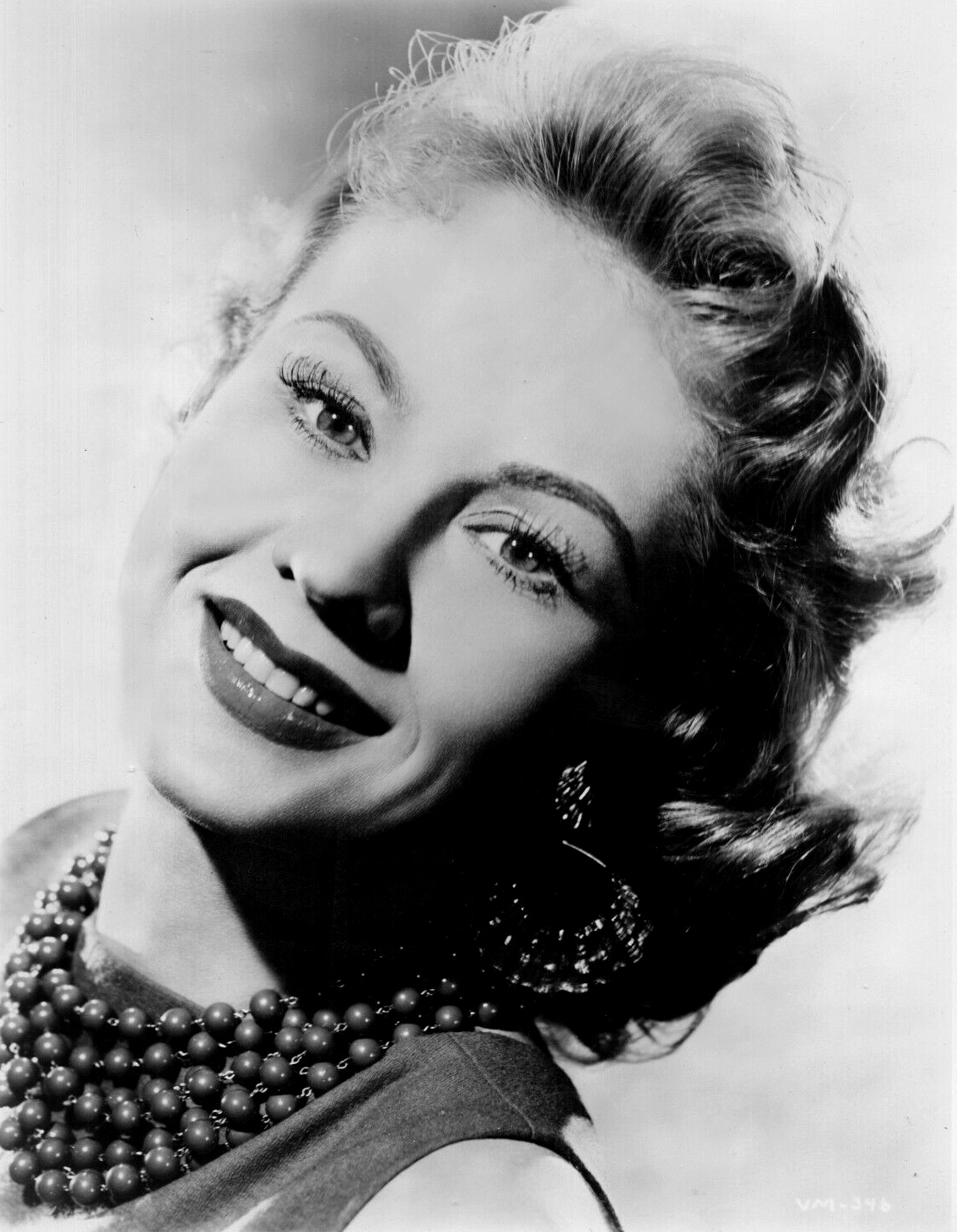
Mayo in the 1940s

In the early 1940s, Virginia Mayo's talent and striking beauty came to the attention of movie mogul Samuel Goldwyn, who signed her to an acting contract with his company.

Goldwyn only made a few films a year and usually lent out the actors he had under contract to other producers. Her first notable role was in Jack London (1943), which starred her future husband Michael O'Shea for producer Samuel Bronston.

Mayo was placed in the chorus of the film Up in Arms just so she could learn, but she was never officially a member of the Goldwyn Girls. Then, RKO borrowed her for a support role in a musical, Seven Days Ashore (1944).

=== Stardom ===
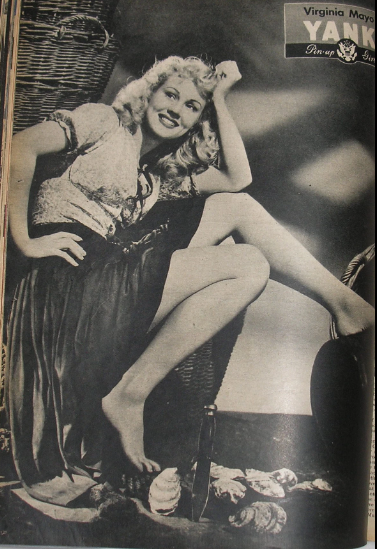
Pin-up photo of Mayo for Yank, the Army Weekly in 1944

Mayo's first starring role came in 1944 opposite comedian Bob Hope in The Princess and the Pirate (1944), a spoof of pirate movies made by Goldwyn. It earned over $3 million at the box office. Goldwyn then made her Danny Kaye's leading lady for the musicals Wonder Man (1945) and The Kid from Brooklyn (1946), both very popular.

Going against the previous stereotype, Mayo accepted the supporting role of unsympathetic gold digger Marie Derry in William Wyler's drama The Best Years of Our Lives (1946) for Goldwyn. Her performance drew favorable reviews from critics. The film also became the highest-grossing film in the U.S. since Gone with the Wind. At the zenith of her career, Mayo was seen as the quintessential voluptuous Hollywood beauty. She was said to "look like a pinup painting come to life." In a film review in The New York Times, critic Bosley Crowther wrote of Mayo, "As a comedy actress, [she] is no better than a rather weak script. But as a model for bathing apparel—well, do you or do you not like bathing suits?" According to widely published reports from the late 1940s, the Sultan of Morocco declared her beauty to be "tangible proof of the existence of God."

Eagle-Lion Films borrowed her to play the lead in Out of the Blue (1947), a comedy with George Brent.

Mayo was reunited with Kaye in The Secret Life of Walter Mitty (1947), another big success, and A Song Is Born (1948), a box-office disappointment. In between, Warner Bros. borrowed her for the lead in a film noir, Smart Girls Don't Talk (1948).

=== Warner Bros. ===
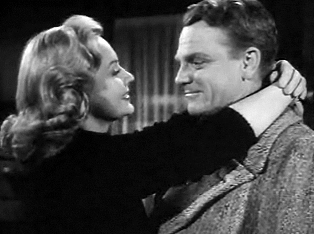
Mayo with James Cagney in White Heat (1949)

Warner Bros. ended up taking over her contract from Goldwyn. They starred her in another film noir, Flaxy Martin (1949) with Zachary Scott, then she did a Western with Joel McCrea and director Raoul Walsh, Colorado Territory (1949), and a comedy with Ronald Reagan, The Girl from Jones Beach (1949).

Mayo received excellent reviews in another unsympathetic role, playing James Cagney's sultry and scheming wife in the gangster classic White Heat (1949), also for Walsh. Mayo admitted she was frightened by Cagney as the psychotic gunman in White Heat because he was so realistic.

Roy Del Ruth borrowed her to play opposite George Raft in Red Light (1949), and she was Milton Berle's leading lady in Always Leave Them Laughing (1949).

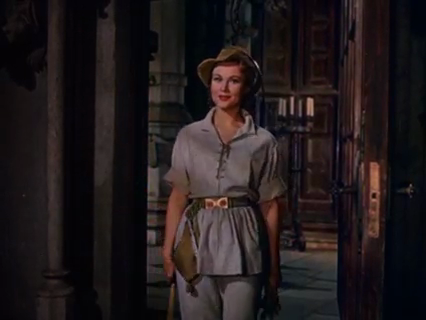
Virginia Mayo in The Flame and the Arrow (1950)

Mayo was top-billed in the film noir Backfire (filmed in 1948 but not released until January 1950), and she was a huge hit in The Flame and the Arrow (1950) as Burt Lancaster's love interest.

She co-starred again with James Cagney and a young Doris Day in The West Point Story (1950), singing and dancing with Cagney, and was Gregory Peck's leading lady in Captain Horatio Hornblower R.N. (1951), Warner Bros. most popular film of the year. She co-starred with Kirk Douglas in a Western for Walsh, Along the Great Divide (1951).

Mayo starred opposite Dennis Morgan in David Butler's Technicolor musical, Painting the Clouds with Sunshine (1951) which was a moderate success. While Mayo appeared in several musicals, using her dance training, her voice was always dubbed.

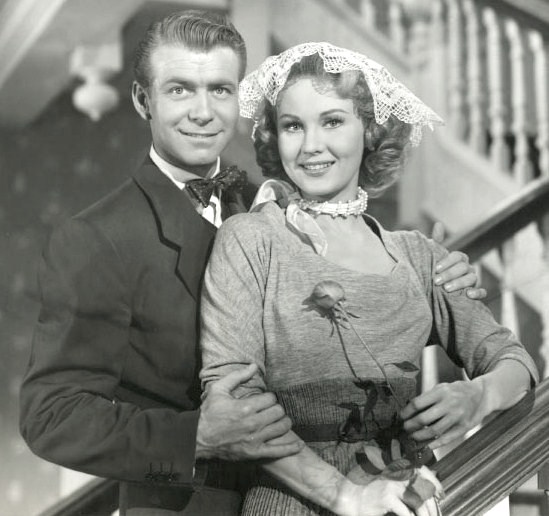
Mayo with Gene Nelson in She's Working Her Way Through College (1952)

Mayo appeared in the all-star cast of Starlift (1951) and was top-billed in She's Working Her Way Through College (1952) with Reagan. She was Alan Ladd's leading lady in The Iron Mistress (1952), a popular biopic of Jim Bowie, and starred in another musical, She's Back on Broadway (1953).

Mayo appeared in the comedy-drama-action film South Sea Woman (1953) with Burt Lancaster and Chuck Connors. RKO borrowed her for a Western in 3-D, Devil's Canyon (1953), and she co-starred with Rex Harrison and George Sanders in King Richard and the Crusaders (1954).

She was top-billed in The Silver Chalice (1954) opposite Pier Angeli and Paul Newman in his film debut. The film was a notorious flop.

=== After Warner Bros. ===
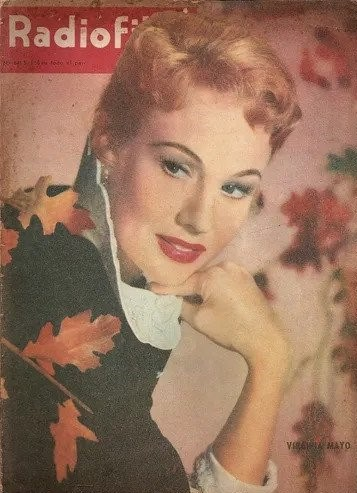
Mayo on the cover of Argentinian magazine Radiofilm, October 1957

Benedict Bogeaus gave her the lead in Pearl of the South Pacific (1955). Edmund Grainger cast her in Great Day in the Morning (1956), with Robert Stack, directed by Jacques Tourneur.

Mayo went to 20th Century Fox to play Robert Ryan's leading lady in The Proud Ones (1956), then she did Congo Crossing (1956) at Universal.

Mayo was reunited with Ladd in The Big Land (1957) made back at Warner Bros. She played Cleopatra in the 1957 fantasy film The Story of Mankind.

Mayo made The Tall Stranger (1957) with McCrea for Allied Artists, Fort Dobbs (1958) with Clint Walker and Westbound (1959) with Randolph Scott, both at Warner Bros. Her last film of the decade was 1959's Jet Over the Atlantic. She began guest-starring on television shows such as Wagon Train, The Loretta Young Show, and Lux Playhouse.

=== 1960s ===
Mayo and her husband, actor Michael O'Shea, made a pilot for a TV series McGarry and His Mouse (1960), which was not picked up. She went to Italy to make Revolt of the Mercenaries (1961).

Mayo's film career tapered off considerably. She appeared in Young Fury (1965) with Rory Calhoun, Castle of Evil (1966), and Fort Utah (1967) with John Ireland. She also guest starred on shows such as Burke's Law and Daktari and appeared onstage in such plays as That Certain Girl (1967) and Barefoot in the Park (1968) with Patty McCormack and Lyle Talbot.

=== Later career ===
Mayo acted on stage for the rest of her career, mostly in dinner theatre and touring shows. Productions included No, No Nanette (1972), 40 Carats (1975), Good News (1977), Move Over Mrs Markham (1980) and Butterflies Are Free (1981).

Mayo continued to occasionally appear on television in shows such as Police Story, Night Gallery, The Love Boat, Remington Steele, and Murder, She Wrote, and a dozen episodes of the soap opera Santa Barbara.

Mayo was one of many famous actors to make a cameo appearance in the all-star box office bomb Won Ton Ton, the Dog Who Saved Hollywood (1976). She had roles in Lanigan's Rabbi (1977), Haunted (1977), and French Quarter (1978). Later film appearances were in Evil Spirits (1990), Midnight Witness (1993) and The Man Next Door (1997), which was her last film role.

Mayo was one of the first to be awarded a star on the Hollywood Walk of Fame. Hers is located at 1751 Vine Street. In 1996, she was honored by her hometown as she received a star on the St. Louis Walk of Fame. In 1993, Mayo published a Christmas themed children's book entitled, Don't Forget Me, Santa Claus through Barrons Juveniles Publishers.

== Personal life ==
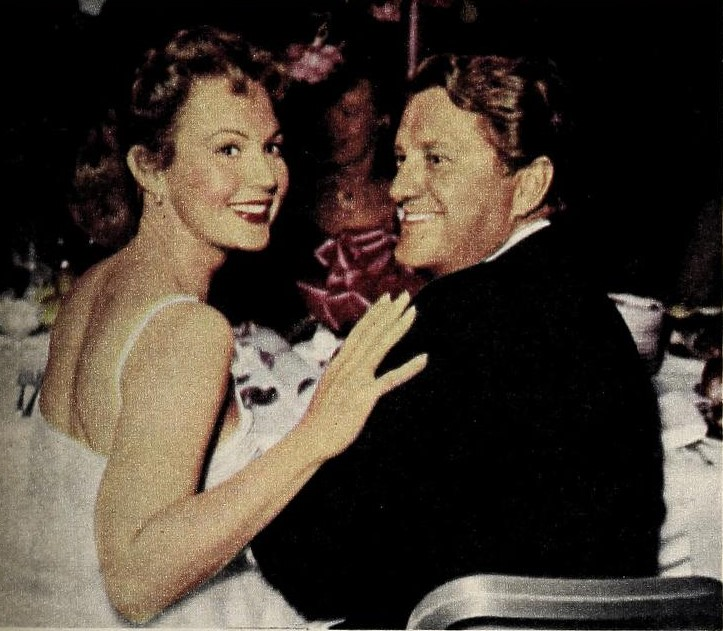
Mayo with her husband Michael O'Shea, 1955

Mayo wed actor Michael O'Shea in 1947, and they remained married until he died in 1973. The couple had one child, Mary Catherine O'Shea (born in 1953). For several decades, the family lived in Thousand Oaks, California.

In later years, she developed a passion for painting and also occupied her time doting on her three grandsons. She was a Presbyterian, but she converted to Roman Catholicism, inspired by Archbishop Fulton J. Sheen. A lifelong Republican, she endorsed Richard Nixon in 1968 and 1972, and longtime friend Ronald Reagan in 1980 and 1984.

== Death ==
Mayo died of pneumonia and complications of congestive heart failure in the Los Angeles area on January 17, 2005, aged 84, at a nursing home in Thousand Oaks. She is buried next to O'Shea in Pierce Brothers Valley Oaks Park in Westlake Village, California.

== Filmography ==
=== Film roles ===
Year	Title	Role	Notes
1943	Follies Girl	Chorine	Uncredited
1943	Jack London	Mamie	
1944	Up in Arms	Nurse Joanna	Uncredited
1944	Seven Days Ashore	Carol Dean	
1944	The Princess and the Pirate	Princess Margaret	
1945	Wonder Man	Ellen Shanley	
1946	The Kid from Brooklyn	Polly Pringle	
1946	The Best Years of Our Lives	Marie Derry	
1947	Out of the Blue	Deborah Tyler	
1947	The Secret Life of Walter Mitty	Rosalind van Hoorn	
1948	Smart Girls Don't Talk	Linda Vickers	
1948	A Song Is Born	Honey Swanson	
1949	Flaxy Martin	Flaxy Martin	
1949	Colorado Territory	Colorado Carson	
1949	The Girl from Jones Beach	Ruth Wilson	
1949	White Heat	Verna Jarrett	
1949	Red Light	Carla North	
1949	Always Leave Them Laughing	Nancy Eagen	
1950	Backfire	Nurse Julie Benson	
1950	The Flame and the Arrow	Anne de Hesse	
1950	The West Point Story	Eve Dillon	
1951	Captain Horatio Hornblower	Lady Barbara Wellesley	
1951	Along the Great Divide	Ann Keith	
1951	Painting the Clouds with Sunshine	Carol	
1951	Starlift	Virginia Mayo	
1952	She's Working Her Way Through College	Angela Gardner / 'Hot Garters Gertie'	
1952	The Iron Mistress	Judalon de Bornay	
1953	She's Back on Broadway	Catherine Terris	
1953	South Sea Woman	Ginger Martin	
1953	Devil's Canyon	Abby Nixon	
1954	King Richard and the Crusaders	Lady Edith Plantagenet	
1954	The Silver Chalice	Helena	
1955	Pearl of the South Pacific	Rita Delaine	
1956	The Proud Ones	Sally	
1956	Great Day in the Morning	Merry Alaine	
1956	Congo Crossing	Louise Whitman	
1957	The Big Land	Helen Jagger	
1957	The Story of Mankind	Cleopatra	
1957	The Tall Stranger	Ellen	
1958	Fort Dobbs	Celia Gray	
1959	Westbound	Norma Putnam	
1959	Jet Over the Atlantic	Jean Gurney	
1961	Revolt of the Mercenaries	Lady Patrizia, Duchessa di Rivalta	
1964	Young Fury	Sara McCoy	
1966	Castle of Evil	Mary Theresa 'Sable' Pulaski	
1967	Fort Utah	Linda Lee	
1975	Fugitive Lovers	Liz Trent	
1976	Won Ton Ton, the Dog Who Saved Hollywood	Miss Battley	
1977	Haunted	Michelle	
1978	French Quarter	Countess Willie Piazza / Ida	
1990	Evil Spirits	Janet Wilson	
1993	Midnight Witness	Kitty	
1997	The Man Next Door	Lucia	Final film role

=== Short subjects ===
Year	Title	Role
1939	Gals and Gallons	Virginia Jones
1950	So You Think You're Not Guilty	Herself
1952	Screen Snapshots: Hollywood Night Life	Herself
1958	Screen Snapshots: Salute to Hollywood	Herself

=== Television credits ===
Year	Title	Role	Notes
1957	Conflict		Episode: "Execution Night"
1958	Wagon Train	Beauty Jamison	Episode: "The Beauty Jamison Story"
1958	The Loretta Young Show	Myrna Nelson	Episode: "Operation Snowball"
1959	Schlitz Playhouse of Stars	Gloria Crawford	Episode: "Deathtrap"
1960	McGarry and His Mouse	Kitty McGarry	TV Movie
1965	Burke's Law	Dr. Terry Foster	Episode: "Who Killed the Man on the White Horse?"
1967	Daktari	Vera Potter	Episode: "Judy and the Gorilla"
1969	The Outsider	Jean Daniels	Episode: "Behind God's Back"
1971	Night Gallery	Carrie Crane	Segment: "The Diary"
1975	Police Story	Angie	Episode: "Face for a Shadow"
1977	Lanigan's Rabbi	Margaret Alton	Episode: "The Cadaver in the Clutter"
1984	Santa Barbara	Peaches DeLight	12 episodes
1984	Remington Steele	Herself	Episode: "Cast in Steele"
1984	Murder, She Wrote	Elinor	Episode: "Hooray for Homicide"
1986	The Love Boat	Virginia Wilcox	Episode: "Hello, Emily/The Tour Guide/The Winning Number"
1997	The Naked Truth	Herself	Episode: "Bridesface Revisited"

== Live theater ==
- That Certain Girl (1967, Thunderbird Hotel, Las Vegas)
- Barefoot in the Park (1968 National Company)
- No, No Nanette (1972 National Company)
- 40 Carats (1975/May–June, Hayloft Dinner Theatre, Lubbock, Texas)
- Good News (1977, Paper Mill Playhouse)
- Mover Over Mrs. Markham (1980 National Tour)
- Butterflies Are Free (1981 Tour)
- Follies (1995, Houston and Seattle)

== Radio appearances ==
Year	Program	Episode/source
1946	Lux Radio Theatre	Wonder Man
1951	Lux Radio Theatre	Bright Leaf
1952	Lux Radio Theatre	Captain Horatio Hornblower
1953	Lux Radio Theatre	This Woman Is Dangerous
1953	Lux Summer Theatre	China Run
1954	Lux Radio Theatre	The Iron Mistress
