= Ray Heindorf =

American composer and songwriter (1908–1980)

- Born: August 25, 1908; Haverstraw, New York, U.S.
- Died: February 3, 1980 (aged 71)
- Occupations: composer and songwriter
- Years active: 1929–1972

Raymond John Heindorf (August 25, 1908 – February 3, 1980) was an American composer and songwriter who was noted for his work in film.

== Early life ==
Born in Haverstraw, New York, Heindorf worked as a pianist in a silent movie house in Mechanicville in his early teens. In 1928, he moved to New York City, where he landed a job as a musical arranger before heading to Hollywood in late February 1929. He gained his first job as an orchestrator at MGM, where he worked on Hollywood Revue of 1929, and subsequently went on the road playing piano for Lupe Vélez.

== Hollywood years ==
After completing the tour with Vélez, Heindorf joined Warner Bros., composing, arranging and conducting music exclusively for the studio for nearly forty years. He, along with George Stoll at Metro-Goldwyn-Mayer, were jazz aficionados well known in the black entertainment community for employing minority musicians in their studio music departments.

Heindorf appeared on screen, uncredited, as the orchestra leader in several films such as My Wild Irish Rose (1947), Young Man with a Horn (1950), and I'll See You in My Dreams (1951). He undertook the musical direction of Judy Garland's comeback film A Star is Born (1954) and made a cameo as himself in the premiere party sequence where Jack Carson's character congratulates him on a great score.

Among Heindorf's other screen credits as musical director, composer, or music supervisor and conductor are 42nd Street, Gold Diggers of 1935, Knute Rockne All American, The Great Lie, Kings Row, Night and Day, Tea for Two, A Streetcar Named Desire, The Jazz Singer, Calamity Jane, No Time for Sergeants, The Helen Morgan Story, Marjorie Morningstar, Damn Yankees, Auntie Mame, The Young Philadelphians, Finian's Rainbow, and his final musical for Jack L. Warner, 1776.

== Academy Awards ==
Between 1942 and 1969, Heindorf was nominated for eighteen Academy Awards, seventeen of them for Best Score and one nomination for Best Song. He won three times in the category of Best Score of a Musical, for Yankee Doodle Dandy (1942), This is the Army (1943), and The Music Man (1962). His awards in 1942 and '43 made him one of the first composers or songwriters to win Oscars in consecutive years in a musical category.

== Jazz recordings ==
Heindorf was a friend and admirer of jazz pianist Art Tatum. As a gift for their mutual friends, Heindorf hosted two Tatum piano performances at his Hollywood home in 1950 and 1955. He recorded these private concerts, which were issued as Art Tatum: 20th Century Piano Genius on the Verve label.

== Personal life ==
Census records from 1930 show that Heindorf was living at the time in the Hollywood Hills with his friend Arthur Lange, a bandleader and composer. Heindorf was later married and divorced twice and had three children. His son Michael was also a film composer.
