= Wars of the Roses (disambiguation) =

The Wars of the Roses (1455–1485) were a series of dynastic civil wars fought in medieval England.

War(s) of the Roses may also refer to:

== Arts and entertainment ==
=== Shakespeare-related ===
- The War of the Roses (Shakespeare), a modern-day play cycle based on Shakespeare's history plays
- The Wars of the Roses (adaptation), a 1963 theatrical, and later BBC TV adaptation of the three parts of Shakespeare's Henry VI, and Richard III
- A three part BBC adaptation of the three parts of Shakespeare's Henry VI, and Richard III was broadcast in 2016 as The Hollow Crown: The Wars of the Roses

=== Other uses in arts and entertainment ===
- Wars of the Roses (album), a 2011 studio album by the band Ulver
- The War of the Roses (novel), a 1981 novel by Warren Adler
  - The War of the Roses (film), a 1989 American film based on the novel, starring Michael Douglas and Kathleen Turner
  - The Roses (film), a 2025 reimagining of the original film, starring Benedict Cumberbatch and Olivia Colman
- War of the Roses (radio show), a live entertainment program, created 1994 that catches cheaters in relationships
- War of the Roses (video game), a 2012 action video game based on the dynastic civil wars
- Wars of the Roses, a series of historical novels by Conn Iggulden
- Yu-Gi-Oh! The Duelists of the Roses, a PlayStation 2 strategy game that reimagines the Wars of the Roses by placing Yu-Gi-Oh! characters in the roles of Lancastrian and Yorkist leaders.

== Sports ==
- Roses Match or "The War of the Roses", any game of cricket between Yorkshire County Cricket Club and Lancashire County Cricket Club, first played in 1849
- Roses Tournament, annual sports competition between Lancaster University and the University of York
- Rugby League War of the Roses, rugby league matches between Lancashire and Yorkshire, beginning 1895
- The War of the Roses, rivalry between two American minor league baseball teams, the Lancaster Barnstormers and the York Revolution
- Wars of the Roses (air race) (1913), Leeds

== Other uses ==
- "The War of the Roses", 1886 campaign for governor of Tennessee, contested between brothers
- "War of the Roses", 2016 Spanish Socialist Workers' Party leadership crisis
- "War of the Roses", an annual event of The East Kingdom of the Society for Creative Anachronism

== See also ==
- "Come Alive (The War of the Roses)", a song by Janelle Monáe from her 2010 album The ArchAndroid
