= Peter Hansen (actor) =

American actor (1921–2017)

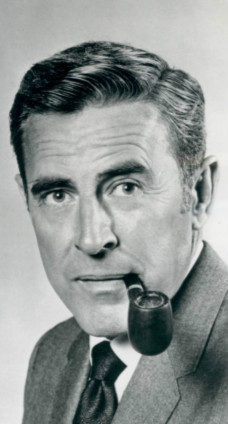
- Hansen in 1973.
- Born: Peter Franklin Hansen; December 5, 1921; Oakland, California, U.S.
- Died: April 9, 2017 (aged 95); Tarzana, California, U.S.
- Education: University of Michigan
- Occupation: Actor
- Years active: 1950–2004
- Spouse: Florence Elizabeth Moe (m. 1943; died 1993)
- Children: 3

Peter Franklin Hansen (December 5, 1921 – April 9, 2017) was an American actor, best known for his role as lawyer Lee Baldwin, on the soap opera General Hospital, appearing in the role from 1965 to 1986, briefly in 1989 and 1990, and returning to the role from 1992 to 2004. In 1989, he appeared in the movie The War of the Roses.

== Early life ==
Hansen was born on December 5, 1921, in Oakland, California to Sydney Henry Hansen (1897-1971) and Lena Gertrude Young (1896-1983). His family moved to Detroit, Michigan where his parents divorced. His mother remarried Falconer O'Brien, and had a daughter named Charlotte O'Brien, who died in 1934 at the age of five. Hansen served in the U.S. Marine Corps during World War II and flew combat in the South Pacific. He flew F4U Corsairs and participated in the invasion of Peleliu in September 1944. In 1950, after he left the Marines, Hansen signed a contract with Paramount Pictures and became an actor.

== Career ==
Hansen appeared in more than 100 films, television series and made-for-television movies. His early acting roles were at the famed Pasadena Playhouse. Hansen was a guest star on Reed Hadley's CBS crime drama, Public Defender, and the television adaptation of Gertrude Berg's comedy The Goldbergs. In addition to his work on General Hospital, he notably co-starred in 1963 on the NBC soap opera Ben Jerrod. He also appeared on The Golden Girls in 1985 (Season 1, Episode 5) as Dr. Elliott Clayton, a casanova who makes a pass at Blanche while dating Dorothy. In 1988, he starred in an episode of Cheers ("And God Created Woodman"; Season 6, Episode 14), as Daniel T. Collier, the CEO and chairman of the board of Lillian, the company which owns Cheers.

Other notable appearances include work on Broken Arrow, Richard Diamond, Private Detective, Maverick, Sea Hunt, Petticoat Junction, Gomer Pyle - U.S.M.C., How The West Was Won, The Adventures of Jim Bowie, Magnum, P.I., L.A. Law, Night Court and Growing Pains.

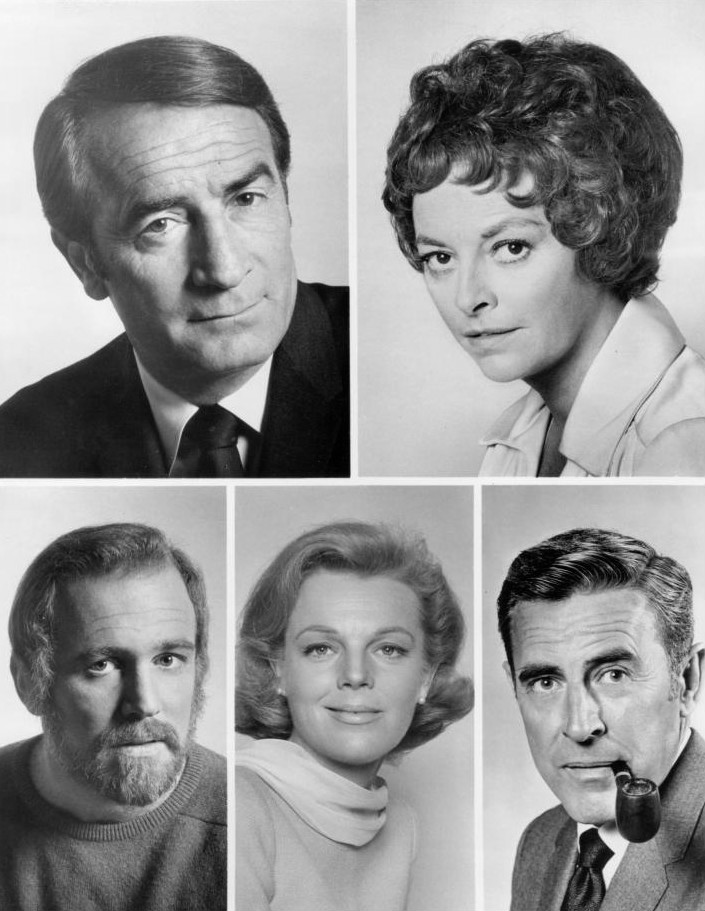
Cast of General Hospital 1973 (top): John Beradino, Emily McLaughlin (bottom): Martin West, Rachel Ames, Peter Hansen

Hansen had a major role in the 1950 Western film Branded with Alan Ladd, the 1951 science fiction film When Worlds Collide, and the 1952 Western film The Savage with Charlton Heston. In the 1960s, He made commercials for Chrysler products, mostly Plymouths, on shows hosted by Lawrence Welk, Steve Allen, and Garry Moore. In 1961, Hansen was a news anchor at the Los Angeles based TV station KCOP-TV.

In 1997, Hansen began playing the character on the sister show Port Charles. The early years of Port Charles saw the Baldwins as the core family, focusing on Lee's son, Scotty, and granddaughter, Karen. After their storyline took them back to "GH", Peter made occasional appearances on both shows, last appearing in 2004. Although he retired from acting afterwards, he did appear at the off-screen 50th Anniversary party in 2013 along with former on-screen wife Susan Brown.

== Personal life and death ==
Hansen met his wife, Florence Elizabeth "Betty" Moe, while in high school and married her in 1943. They had three children, Kristen, Peter and Gretchen, and three grandchildren: Allison, Erik and Jamal. Betty died in 1993 and his daughter, Kris, died in 1996. He then shared 24 years as companion to Barbara Wenzel.

Hansen resided in Tarzana, California, with his family, and he enjoyed flying, owning his own Cessna for decades, spent many vacations in the Sierra Nevada high country. He led a devoted spiritual life at St. Nicholas of Myra Episcopal Church, in Encino, California. Hansen died on April 9, 2017, at his home in Tarzana, at the age of 95. He was cremated and his ashes were returned to the family.

== Awards ==
Hansen won a Daytime Emmy Award for his portrayal of Lee Baldwin on General Hospital in 1979 in the category of Outstanding Supporting Actor in a Drama Series.

== Filmography ==
=== Film ===
Year	Title	Role	Notes	Ref.
1950	Branded	Tonio	Western film directed by Rudolph Maté; Adapted from the novel Montana Rides by Max Brand under pen name Evan Evans	
1950	The Goldbergs	Ted Gordon		
1951	The Last Outpost	Lt. Crosby^{1}	Western film directed by Lewis R. Foster	
1951	Passage West	Michael Karns	Western film directed by Lewis R. Foster	
1951	Darling, How Could You!	Dr. Steve Clark	Comedy film directed by Mitchell Leisen; Based on James Barrie's play Alice Sit-by-the-Fire	
1951	When Worlds Collide	Dr. Tony Drake	Science fiction film directed by Rudolph Maté; Based on the 1932 science fiction novel of the same name, co-written by Philip Wylie and Edwin Balmer	
1952	The Greatest Show on Earth	Spectator^{2}	Uncredited, Drama film directed and produced by Cecil B. DeMille	
1952	Something to Live For	Stage Cast Member^{2}	Uncredited, Drama film directed and produced by George Stevens	
1952	The Savage	Lt. Weston Hathersall	Western film directed by George Marshall; Based on L. L. Foreman's novel, The Renegade, first published in 1949 by Pocket Books.	
1954	Prisoner of War	Capt. Fred Osborne	Uncredited, War–drama film directed by Andrew Marton	
1954	Brigadoon	New York Club Patron	Uncredited, Musical feature film made in CinemaScope & Ansco Color and directed by Vincente Minnelli; Based on the Broadway musical of the same name by Alan Jay Lerner and Frederick Loewe	
1954	Drum Beat	Lt. Goodsall	CinemaScope western film in WarnerColor written & directed by Delmer Daves and co-produced by Daves and Alan Ladd	
1955	The Violent Men	George Menefee	Uncredited, CinemaScope western drama film ditecred by Rudolph Maté; Based on the novel Smoky Valley by Donald Hamilton first published in 1954	
1955	A Bullet for Joey	Fred	Film noir directed by Lewis Allen	
1955	Top of the World	Capt. Cochrane	Adventure film directed by Lewis R. Foster and written by John D. Klorer and N. Richard Nash	
1955	The King's Thief	Isaac Newton	Uncredited	
1956	Hell on Frisco Bay	Detective Connors	Film noir–crime film directed by Frank Turtle	
1956	Diane	2nd Court Physician	Uncredited	
1956	The Proud and Profane	Lieutenant (jg) Hutchins	Dramatic war romance directed and wrriten by George Seaton; Based on the 1953 novel The Magnificent Bastards by Lucy Herndon Crockett	
1956	A Cry in the Night	Dr. Frazee	Film noir, dramatic, thriller film directed by Frank Tuttle; Based on the 1955 novel by Whit Masterson titled All Through the Night.	
1956	The Ten Commandments	Young aide	Uncredited, Biblical epic film produced, directed, and narrated by Cecil B. DeMille and shot in VistaVision (color by Technicolor); Based on Prince of Egypt by Dorothy Clarke Wilson, Pillar of Fire by J.H. Ingraham, On Eagle's Wings by A.E. Southon, and the Book of Exodus	
1956	Three Violent People	Lt. Marr	Western film directed by Rudolph Maté	
1957	5 Steps to Danger	Karl Plesser	Crime film directed, produced, and co–written by Henry S. Kesler; Based on the novel The Steel Mirror by Donald Hamilton	
1958	The Deep Six	Lieutenant Dooley	World War II drama film directed by Rudolph Maté; Loosely based on a novel of the same name by Martin Dibner	
1961	Pocketful of Miracles	Governor's Aide	Uncredited	
1964	Apache Rifles	Capt. Green		
1965	Harlow	Hansen - Assistant Director		
1983	The Man Who Wasn't There	Police Lieutenant		
1985	Junior	Electrician		
1989	The War of the Roses	Mr. Marshall		
2002	Dragonfly	Phillip Darrow		

=== Television ===
Year	Title	Role	Notes	Ref.
1950	The Goldbergs	Ted Gordon		
1954	General Electric Theater	Peter Forbes	Episode: "Walking John Stopped Here" (S2:E14)	
1954	Cavalcade of America	Guest	Episode: "Duel at the O.K. Corral" (S2:E20)	
1954	Schlitz Playhouse	Guest	Episode: "At the Natchez Inn" (S3:E21)^{1}	
1954	Schlitz Playhouse	Claudius Fabian	Episode: "The Roman and the Renegade" (S3:E49)	
1954	Public Defender	Don Henderson	Episode: "Escape" (S1:E20)	
1954	Public Defender	Steve Selvey	Episode "The Do-Gooder" (S2:E6)	
1954	Public Defender	Fred Daniels	Episode: "The Man Who Couldn't Remember" (S2:E18)	
1954	The Loretta Young Show	Jim Roberts	Episode: "The Lamp" (S2:E4)	
1954	Your Favorite Story	Guest	Episode: "The Robbers" (S2:E1)	
1954	Your Favorite Story	Bill	Episode: "The Unforeseen" (S2:E13)	
1954	Your Favorite Story	Guest	Episode: "It Couldn't Happen" (S2:E19)	
1954	Your Favorite Story	Guest	Episode: "The Unknown" (S2:39)	
1954	Lady in the Wings	Edward MacDowell	Made-for-TV-Movie; Part of the Hallmark Hall of Fame Series	
1954	Space Patrol	Doctor Paul Yates	Episode: "Danger: Radiation" (S4:E37)	
1954	Mayor of the Town	Jim	Episode: "The Doctor's Son" (S1:E17)	
1954	The Lone Ranger	Marshal Jim	Episode: "Homer with a High Hat" (S4:E15)	
1955	The Lone Ranger	Jack Morrison	Episode: "Sheriff's Sale" (S4:E21)	
1955	The Lone Ranger	Bill Taylor	Episode: "The Law Lady" (S4:E25)	
1955	The Lone Ranger	Peter Sawtelle^{1}	Episode: "Sawtelle Saga's End" (S4:E29)	
1955	The Lone Ranger	Smiley Phillips^{1}	Episode: "Death Goes to Press" (S4:E43)	
1955	The Lone Wolf	Jackson Smith	Episode: "The Planetarium Story" (S1:E36)	
1955	Crown Theatre with Gloria Swanson	Guest	Episode: "The Antique Shop"	
1955	The Ford Television Theatre	Brad	Episode: "Tomorrow We'll Love" (S3:E20)	
1955	Public Defender	Simms^{1}	Episode: "The Sapphire Mink" (S2:E32)	
1955	Stage 7	Capt. Chuck Boske^{3}	Episode: "Armed" (S1:E14)	
1955	Lux Video Theatre	Philip Adams	Episode: "The Two Dollar Bettor" (S6:E3)	
1955	I Led 3 Lives	Reverend Murkland	Episode: "Commie Dies" (S2:E37)	
1955	Science Fiction Theatre	Dr. Dan Scott^{1}	Episode: "Beyond Return" (S1:E32)	
1956	Chevron Hall of Stars	White	Episode: "Eminent Domain"	
1956	Climax!	Lawyer	Episode: "Faceless Adversary" (S2:E33)	
1956	Telephone Time	William Smith	Episode: "Grandpa Changes the World" (S1:E16)	
1956	The West Point Story	Captain O'Hara	Episode: "Man of Action" (S1:E10)	
1956	Science Fiction Theatre	Dr. Warren Stark^{1}	Episode: "Signals from the Heart" (S2:E1)	
1956	Science Fiction Theatre	Dr. Henry Maxton^{1}	Episode: "The Unguided Missile" (S2:E8)	
1956	Science Fiction Theatre	Prof. Norman Hughes^{1}	Episode: "The Throwback" (S2:E19)	
1956	Science Fiction Theatre	Dr. Edgar Barnes^{1}	Episode: "Doctor Robot" (S2:E30)	
1956	Broken Arrow	Capt. Dennis Farrell	Episode: "Medicine Men" (S1:E6)	
1956	Broken Arrow	Capt. Dennis Farrell	Episode: "Rebellion" (S1:E22)	
1956	Dr. Christian	Conway	Episode: "Homecoming" (S1:E4)	
1956	The Millionaire	Nick Hamilton	Episode: "The Jill Mayfield Story" (S2:E37)	
1957	The People's Choice	Dick Larkin	Episode: "Sock Gets the Works" (S2:E17)	
1957	Science Fiction Theatre	Dr. Jim Wallaby^{1}	Episode: "The Strange Lodger" (S2:E39)	
1957	Zane Grey Theatre	Holton	Episode: "Village of Fear" (S1:E210)	
1957	Navy Log	Guest	Episode: "The Lady and the Atom" (S2:E23)	
1957	Navy Log	Barry^{1}	Episode: "The Marines Have Landed" (S2:E35)	
1957	Broken Arrow	Capt. Dennis Farrell	Episode: "White Man's Magic" (S2:E1)	
1957	The Gray Ghost	Manning	Episode: "Renegade Rangers" (S1:E28)	
1957	Dr. Christian	Rufus Corning	Episode: "Revenge" (S1:E16)	
1957	Dr. Christian	Walters	Episode: "The Alien" (S1:E25)	
1957	Richard Diamond, Private Detective	Tim Wilson	Episode: "The Homicide Habit" (S1:E4)	
1957	The Silent Service	Welch	Episode: "The U.S.S. Seahorse Story" (S1:E16)	
1957	The Silent Service	Cmdr. Charles Miller	Episode: "The Sea Dragon Story" (S1:E23)	
1958	Richard Diamond, Private Detective	Frank Bonner	Episode: "The Payoff" (S2:E3)	
1958	The Restless Gun	Quint Todd	Episode: "A Pressing Engagement" (S1:E23)	
1958	Perry Mason	Howard Black	Episode: "The Case of the Half-Wakened Wife" (S1:E26)	
1958	The Millionaire	Paul Duchamp	Episode: "Millionaire Neal Bowers" (S4:E25)	
1958	Tombstone Territory	George Camden	Episode: "Triangle of Death" (S1:E30)	
1958	How to Marry a Millionaire	Dr. Harvey	Episode: "Operation Greta" (S1:E28)	
1958	Mike Hammer	Steve Sandborg	Episode: "Look at the Old Man Go" (S1:E23)	
1958	Suspicion	Sgt. John Packard	Episode: "Eye for Eye" (S1:E37)	
1958	Man Without a Gun	Ben	Episode: "Invisible Enemy" (S1:E38)	
1958	The Silent Service	Cmdr. Brockman	Episode: "The Nautilus and the Nuns" (S2:E26)	
1958	Sea Hunt	Bennett	Episode: "Mark of the Octopus" (S1:E4)	
1958	Sea Hunt	Police Lt. Tom Quinn	Episode: "Dead Man's Cove" (S1:E33)	
1958	Sea Hunt	George Peterson	Episode: "The Amphibian" (S1:E35)	
1958	Panic!	Sam Travis	Episode: "Twenty-Six Hours to Sunrise" (S2:E13)	
1958	Frontier Doctor	Phillip Tyler	Episode: "San Francisco Story" (S1:E2)	
1958	Flight	Kovacs	Episode: "Flight Surgeon" (S1:E4)	
1958	Goodyear Theatre	Dick	Episode: "Music in the Night" (S1:E9)	
1959	Bat Masterson	Teddy Wright	Episode: "Election Day" (S1:E14)	
1959	Goodyear Theatre	Mike Walker	Episode: "The Golden Shanty" (S3:E5)	
1959	Men into Space	Dr. Charles Cooper	Episode: "Space Trap" (S1:E7)	
1965	General Hospital	Lee Baldwin	Contract role: 1965–1976; 1977–1986; Recurring role: 1990; 1992–2004, (final appearance)	
1997-2000	Port Charles	Lee Baldwin	Recurring role	
