= The Roses (film) =

2025 film by Jay Roach

- Theatrical release poster
- Directed by: Jay Roach
- Screenplay by: Tony McNamara
- Based on: The War of the Roses by Warren Adler
- Produced by: Adam Ackland; Leah Clarke; Ed Sinclair; Tom Carver; Jay Roach; Michelle Graham
- Starring: Benedict Cumberbatch; Olivia Colman; Andy Samberg; Allison Janney; Sunita Mani; Ncuti Gatwa; Jamie Demetriou; Zoë Chao; Kate McKinnon
- Cinematography: Florian Hoffmeister
- Edited by: Jon Poll
- Music by: Theodore Shapiro
- Production companies: South of the River Pictures; SunnyMarch; Delirious Media
- Distributed by: Searchlight Pictures
- Release dates: August 29, 2025 (United States and United Kingdom)
- Running time: 105 minutes
- Countries: United Kingdom; United States
- Language: English
- Budget: $30 million
- Box office: $52 million

The Roses is a 2025 satirical black comedy film directed by Jay Roach from a screenplay by Tony McNamara. It is based on the 1981 novel The War of the Roses by Warren Adler, and is also a reimagining of the 1989 film of the same name. The film stars Benedict Cumberbatch and Olivia Colman as a successful couple whose seemingly picture-perfect marriage begins falling apart. Andy Samberg, Allison Janney, Belinda Bromilow, Sunita Mani, Ncuti Gatwa, Jamie Demetriou, Zoë Chao, and Kate McKinnon appear in supporting roles.

The Roses was released in the United States by Searchlight Pictures on August 29, 2025. It received mixed reviews from critics and grossed $52 million worldwide.

== Plot ==
One afternoon in London, an architect named Theo meets an aspiring chef named Ivy. Ivy tells Theo her dream of moving to the United States to start her own business. Inspired by her enthusiasm, Theo suggests he move with her.

Ten years later, Theo and Ivy relocate to Mendocino, California, and are married with twin children, Hattie and Roy. They have different parenting styles. Ivy spoils the children with desserts and fun activities, while Theo prioritizes their health. Because Ivy sacrificed her business plans to raise their children, Theo surprises her by giving her a piece of real estate where she can finally open her own restaurant.

One night, during a severe storm, Theo's newly designed naval history museum is destroyed, just as Ivy's new restaurant receives an influx of customers seeking shelter. The new customers include a renowned food critic who writes a positive review, resulting in Ivy's business growing rapidly. Theo loses his job due to the building's collapse and agrees to be a stay-at-home parent, while Ivy becomes the new breadwinner of the family. Taking advantage of it, he puts the children on a strict diet and imposes regular physical exercise. As a result, Ivy begins to feel shut out from her children's lives, while Theo becomes jealous of Ivy's success.

Feeling a rift in their relationship, the two make several attempts to reconcile, including a romantic trip to New York City and marriage counseling, but all fail. They begin to feel resentment for each other and blame the other for their problems. As a last attempt to save their marriage, Ivy uses the profits from franchising her restaurant to give Theo an opportunity to build their dream house.

Three years later, the house is complete, and 13-year-old Hattie and Roy are prodigies accepted into a school in Miami on sports scholarships. Without the children to distract them, Ivy and Theo's frustrations turn into a feud. Ivy mocks and humiliates Theo in front of their friends during a housewarming party, discrediting his hard work. Theo, after saving a beached whale and experiencing an epiphany, realizes he and Ivy are miserable and should divorce. He asks only for the house, but Ivy wants to leave him with nothing.

Facing an impasse, they decide to make each other's lives unbearable using cruel tactics, which results in Theo being blacklisted from architecture and Ivy's restaurants being closed for health violations. Ivy has an allergic reaction after Theo tricks her into eating a raspberry dessert and will only cure her with an EpiPen if Ivy signs the papers. She only pretends to sign them, but Theo injects her with the EpiPen anyway, claiming he never would have let her die. An enraged Ivy then gets their gun and threatens to shoot him. They chase each other around the house, breaking Ivy's beloved stove that belonged to Julia Child in the process. Overwhelmed, Theo admits he still loves Ivy despite everything that has happened between them. Ivy says she feels the same and puts down the gun.

As the two become intimate, a gas leak occurs due to the damage to Ivy's stove. Unaware of the situation, Theo asks their smart home system to turn on the fire, and the screen cuts to white.

== Cast ==
- Benedict Cumberbatch as Theo Rose, a successful architect and Ivy's husband
- Olivia Colman as Ivy Rose, an up-and-coming restaurateur and Theo's wife
- Andy Samberg as Barry, the Roses' friend, Amy's husband, and later, Theo's divorce lawyer
- Kate McKinnon as Amy, the Roses' friend and Barry's wife
- Allison Janney as Eleanor, Ivy's divorce lawyer
- Belinda Bromilow as Janice, Theo and Ivy's marriage counselor
- Ncuti Gatwa as Jeffrey, the front-house manager at Ivy's restaurant
- Sunita Mani as Jane, Ivy's sous-chef
- Zoë Chao as Sally, the Roses' friend and Rory's wife
- Jamie Demetriou as Rory, the Roses' friend and Sally's husband
- Hala Finley as Hattie Rose, Theo and Ivy's daughter
  - Delaney Quinn as young Hattie
- Wells Rappaport as Roy Rose, Theo and Ivy's son
  - Ollie Robinson as young Roy
- Akie Kotabe as Alan

== Production ==
It was announced in April 2024 that Benedict Cumberbatch and Olivia Colman were set to star in and produce a reimagining of the 1989 film (made by Searchlight's sister studio 20th Century Studios), with Jay Roach set to direct and Tony McNamara writing the screenplay. In June, Kate McKinnon and Andy Samberg were among several additions made to the cast. McNamara revealed he used both Warren Adler's novel and the 1989 film as jumping-off points, although only the novel is credited. He explained "I thought, Why don't we make a movie that's more focused on what we do to each other while we're married, and still sort of pay homage to the original?”

Filming began on June 10, 2024, in Devon.

== Release ==
The Roses was released in the United States and the United Kingdom on August 29, 2025.

=== Home media ===
The film was released digitally on October 21, 2025, and on Blu-ray and DVD on November 25.

== Reception ==
=== Box office ===
In the United States, the film made $800,000 during Wednesday and Thursday night previews. The film was expected to make more than $7 million during the four-day Labor Day weekend, which it did, bringing in $7.7 million that weekend. The film grossed $2.9 million in its opening weekend in the United Kingdom and Ireland, finishing with a $13 million gross in the market.

=== Critical response ===
On the review aggregator website Rotten Tomatoes, 64% of 196 critics' reviews are positive, with an average rating of 6.1/10. The website's consensus reads: "The Roses' blend of broad comedy and dark satire makes for an uneasy marriage, although watching Olivia Colman and Benedict Cumberbatch trade barbs is a treat onto itself." On Metacritic, the film has a weighted average score of 58 out of 100 based on 38 critics, indicating "mixed or average" reviews. Audiences polled by CinemaScore gave the film an average grade of "B+" on an A+ to F scale.

Film critic Linda Holmes opined that director Jay Roach's background in comedy movies resulted in this adaptation failing to capture the satire of the novel and 1989 film.

Award	Date of ceremony	Category	Recipient(s)	Result	Ref.
AWGIE Awards	February 19, 2026	Best Adapted Screenplay	Tony McNamara	Nominated	
British Academy Film Awards	February 22, 2026	Outstanding British Film	The Roses	Longlisted	
