= Great Day in the Morning =

1956 film by Jacques Tourneur

- Directed by: Jacques Tourneur
- Screenplay by: Lesser Samuels
- Based on: Great Day in the Morning; 1950 novel by Robert Hardy Andrews
- Produced by: Edmund Grainger
- Starring: Virginia Mayo; Robert Stack; Ruth Roman
- Cinematography: William E. Snyder
- Edited by: Harry Marker
- Music by: Leith Stevens
- Production company: Edmund Grainger Productions
- Distributed by: RKO Radio Pictures
- Release dates: May 16, 1956 (Premiere-Denver, CO)
- Running time: 92 minutes
- Country: United States
- Language: English

Great Day in the Morning is a 1956 American Technicolor Superscope western film directed by Jacques Tourneur and starring Virginia Mayo, Robert Stack, and Ruth Roman. It was distributed by RKO Radio Pictures. The story is set in 1860s Denver.

== Plot ==
In 1861, just prior to the outbreak of the Civil War, Owen Pentecost is a man from North Carolina who comes west to Denver in the Colorado Territory on a whim. He encounters Ann Merry Alaine, who is going there to open a dress shop.

In a Denver hotel saloon, Owen wins a poker game with the owner, Jumbo Means, who bet his estate on the last hand. Along with the hotel comes Boston Grant, who works there.

Both women begin to fall for Owen. He has money on his mind, specifically the gold of the town's Confederates, which turns out to be what brought him here. But the predominantly Union town wants the gold, and with the Civil War approaching, the town is split. Owen leads the Southerners in an escape attempt with the gold.

Jumbo stabs Boston to death, but is himself blown up by dynamite. Owen escapes, allowed to go free by a Union soldier.

== Cast ==
- Robert Stack as Owen
- Virginia Mayo as Ann Merry
- Ruth Roman as Boston
- Raymond Burr as Jumbo
- Alex Nicol as Capt. Kirby
- Regis Toomey as Father Murphy
- Leo Gordon as Zeff Masterson
- Carlton Young as Col. Gibson
- Donald MacDonald as Gary John Lawford
- Peter Whitney as Phil the Cannibal
- Dan White as Rogers (uncredited)

== Reception ==
The Philadelphia Inquirer wrote: "There's so much feudin' and fussin' and talk about the possibility of Civil War, that when the flag at Fort Sumter is fired on it comes as both anticlimax and relief....As in several recent films, the cast is considerably better than the material. Richard Hardy Andrews' novel has given director Jacques Tourneur and scenarist Lesser Samuels a tough time, but they have tried. And so, to their credit, have Robert Stack, Ruth Roman, Virginia Mayo, Alex Nicol, Raymond Burr, young Donald MacDonald, Leo Gordon and Regis Toomey. 'Great Day in the Morning' is in Superscope and Technicolor, and at least it looks quite handsome."

== See also ==
- List of American films of 1956
- "Great day in the morning" is a southern expression, e.g., James Brown used it in Get On Up (2014)
- "Great Day in the Morning", a song recorded by such artists as:
  - Hoots & Hellmouth, on the album Salt (2012)
  - The Hoppers, a gospel song on the album Great Day (2003)
  - Brad Vickers & His Vestapolitans
- "Greatdayndamornin'/Booty" (2012), a song by D'Angelo
