= 5 Steps to Danger =

1957 film

- Theatrical release poster
- Directed by: Henry S. Kesler
- Screenplay by: Henry S. Kesler
- Story by: Donald Hamilton; Turnley Walker
- Based on: The Steel Mirror; 1948 story in The Saturday Evening Post by Donald Hamilton
- Produced by: Henry S. Kesler
- Starring: Ruth Roman; Sterling Hayden
- Cinematography: Kenneth Peach
- Edited by: Aaron Stell
- Music by: Paul Sawtell; Bert Shefter
- Color process: Black and white
- Production companies: Henry S. Kesler Productions; Grand Productions
- Distributed by: United Artists
- Release date: January 30, 1957 (New York City)
- Running time: 80 minutes
- Country: United States
- Language: English

5 Steps to Danger is a 1957 American film noir crime film directed, produced, and co–written by Henry S. Kesler. It stars Ruth Roman and Sterling Hayden, with a cast that also included Werner Klemperer, Richard Gaines, Charles Davis, Jeanne Cooper, and Peter Hansen. 5 Steps to Danger was based on the novel The Steel Mirror by Donald Hamilton.

== Plot ==
John Emmett, an American everyman, is on a fishing and hunting trip when his car breaks down. He is offered a ride by a stranger, Ann Nicholson, who is driving to Santa Fe. She asks him to take turns behind the wheel.

During a stopover a woman identifying herself as a nurse takes John aside in a diner and says she has been following them because Ann is an escaped mental patient of Dr. Frederick Simmons. And although he is not sure what to believe, John begins to doubt Ann when two policemen attempt to arrest them, claiming to be investigating a murder in Los Angeles.

John and Ann slip away. He demands the truth, whereupon Ann says she is an ex-German citizen who stumbled upon a government plot and is in possession of valuable scientific transcripts embedded on a small cosmetic mirror. In order to prevent Simmons from having Ann committed to a mental institution against her will, John asks Ann to marry him, while also declaring his love for her. They wed in a small town and then continue their journey to find the scientist who wrote the transcripts. The chase ends in a confrontation between Simmons, who is actually a Soviet spy, and his accomplices versus FBI and CIA agents, who verify Ann's story. Ann and John enjoy their honeymoon on the fishing trip John had originally planned.

== Cast ==
- Ruth Roman as Ann Nicholson
- Sterling Hayden as John Emmett
- Werner Klemperer as Dr. Simmons
- Richard Gaines as Dean Brant
- Charles Davis as Agent Kirkpatrick
- Jeanne Cooper as Helen Bethke
- Peter Hansen as Karl Plesser
- Karl Ludwig Lindt as Kissel (as Karl Lindt)
- John Mitchum as Deputy
- John Frederick as Sheriff (as John Merrick)
- Ken Curtis as Agent Jim Anderson (uncredited)

== Reception ==
=== Critical response ===
The New York Times wrote that the film was "a rather lax and familiar melodrama about Communist espionage in this country, offers two real jolts. The climax, and this may be an unfair revelation, has a known subversive given some leeway inside a vital guided missile plant. Secondly, the place seems about as inaccessible as a drive-in restaurant. [...] The responsibility, or irresponsibility, must be shouldered by Henry S. Kesler, who handled the screenwriting, the directing and producing, and none of it very well."

=== Release ===
5 Steps to Danger was released in theatres on January 30, 1957.
