= Kurt Luedtke =

American screenwriter and newspaper editor (1939–2020)

- Born: September 28, 1939; Grand Rapids, Michigan, U.S.
- Died: August 9, 2020 (aged 80); Royal Oak, Michigan, U.S.
- Education: Brown University; Medill School of Journalism
- Occupations: Journalist; Screenwriter

Kurt Luedtke (/ˈluːtki/; September 28, 1939 – August 9, 2020) was an American screenwriter and executive editor of the Detroit Free Press. He wrote Out of Africa (1985), for which he won the Academy Award for Best Adapted Screenplay. He also wrote Absence of Malice (1981), for which he was nominated for the Academy Award for Best Original Screenplay, as well as Random Hearts (1999). All three films were directed by Sydney Pollack.

== Early life ==
Luedtke was born in Grand Rapids, Michigan on September 28, 1939. His father, Herman, worked as a lumber broker; his mother was named Virginia. He obtained a bachelor's degree from Brown University, then joined the fast-track summer law program at the University of Michigan Law School. However, he switched career paths after traveling to the Southern United States to observe the unfolding civil rights movement and penned several articles on the subject as a freelancer. He then studied at the Medill School of Journalism of Northwestern University.

== Career ==
Luedtke became a newspaper reporter, first in Grand Rapids, Michigan, and then at the Miami Herald. Luedtke moved to the Detroit Free Press in 1965. He started off as general assignment reporter, then rose to executive editor at age 33.

Luedtke left the Free Press and quit journalism altogether in 1978. He moved to Hollywood to break into the film business, where his only entry was as a screenwriter. His intention was to write a book, but his idea for a book about reporting came to the attention of Orion Pictures, which optioned it before it was written for $20,000 and pitched it to director George Roy Hill, who liked it but was unavailable to help on the screenplay. Luedtke offered to write the screenplay for free providing that he could have his idea back if Orion didn't proceed with the movie. Ultimately, Sydney Pollack was available to direct the movie, which became Absence of Malice, beginning the working relationship between the two men. Luedtke received a nomination for the Academy Award for Best Original Screenplay, a rare accomplishment for a first-time screenwriter. He again collaborated with Pollack in Out of Africa (1985). The film won seven Oscars (from 11 nominations), including Luedtke's award for Best Adapted Screenplay. His final partnership with Pollack came in Random Hearts, released in 1999.

== Personal life ==
Luedtke was married to Eleanor for 55 years until his death. The two met while they were working at the Miami Herald. He recovered from cancer on two occasions.

On August 9, 2020, Luedtke died from multiple organ failure at Beaumont Hospital in Royal Oak, Michigan, at the age of 80.
