= Warren Adler =

American writer (1927–2019)

- Born: December 16, 1927; Brooklyn, New York
- Died: April 15, 2019 (aged 91); Manhattan, New York
- Education: New York University; The New School
- Occupation: Author
- Spouse: Sonia Adler
- Children: Michael Adler, Jonathan Adler, David Adler
- Writing career
- Genres: Fiction, Poetry, Essays
- Subject: Writing
- Notable works: The War of the Roses, Random Hearts, The Sunset Gang
- Website: www.warrenadler.com

Warren Adler (December 16, 1927 – April 15, 2019) was an American author, playwright and poet. His novel The War of the Roses was turned into a dark comedy starring Michael Douglas, Kathleen Turner and Danny DeVito. Another film adaptation titled The Roses starring Benedict Cumberbatch and Olivia Colman was released on August 29, 2025.

Adler was an essayist, short-story writer, poet and playwright, whose works have been translated into 25 languages.

== Education and early career ==
Adler was born in Brooklyn, New York, the son of Sol Adler and Fritzie (née Feige Goldman), Jewish immigrants from Tarnów and Volhynia, respectively. Rabbi Solomon Goldman was his uncle. He graduated from P.S. 91, Brooklyn Technical High School, New York University, and attended the New School. Among his classmates were Mario Puzo and William Styron. In 2009, Adler was the recipient of the "Alumni of the Year" honor at NYU's College of Arts and Science and was also the founder of the Jackson Hole Writer's Conference, WY. During his residence in Jackson Hole, Wyoming, Adler was Chairman of the Library Board.

After graduating from NYU with a degree in English literature, Adler worked for the New York Daily News before becoming editor of the Queens Post weekly. During the Korean War, he served in the US Army in the Pentagon as the Washington Correspondent for Armed Forces Press Service. Before his success as a novelist, Adler had a career as an entrepreneur. He owned four radio stations and a TV station, and founded and ran his own advertising and public relations agency in Washington, D.C.; his firm Warren Adler Ltd. was responsible for advertising and PR campaigns for political candidates, businesses and communities. Among his clients was the Watergate complex, which Adler named. He closed his agency in 1974 after the publication of his first novel, Undertow, and devoted himself to a writing career. He sponsored the Warren Adler Short Story contest on the Web.

== Writing career ==
Adler wrote The War of the Roses and Random Hearts. The War of the Roses was adapted into a feature film starring Michael Douglas, Kathleen Turner, and Danny DeVito in 1989. Random Hearts was adapted into a film starring Harrison Ford and Kristin Scott Thomas in 1999. There was a bidding war in a Hollywood commission for his unpublished book Private Lies. Newsweek reported, "TriStar Pictures outbid Warner Bros and Columbia, and purchased the film rights to Private Lies for $1.2 million. …the highest sums yet paid in Hollywood for an unpublished manuscript."

Adler also wrote The Sunset Gang, produced by Linda Lavin for the American Playhouse series. It was adapted into a trilogy starring Uta Hagen, Harold Gould, Dori Brenner, Jerry Stiller and Ron Rifkin, and gained Doris Roberts an Emmy nomination for Best Supporting Actress in a Mini-Series. The musical version of The Sunset Gang received an off-Broadway production with music scored by composer L. Russell Brown.

In 1981, Adler wrote a sequel to The War of the Roses, The Children of the Roses. It focuses on the effect the Roses' divorce had on their children.

On October 29, 1986, he started his own production company Soaring Eagle Productions, to develop Hollywood film adaptations of his novels, such as We Are Holding the President Hostage, which is the first film to go before the cameras, and he developed The War of the Roses, Trans-Siberian Express and Random Hearts.

Adler was early involved in electronic publishing. In the early 2000s, he predicted the decline of printed books and he envisioned digital publishing becoming the norm. He acquired his complete back-list, published now under his own company, Stonehouse Press. He wrote an article for The Author's Guild stating that authors had best prepare for a major change in the way traditional publishing businesses operated. He argued that they no longer had a monopoly on marketing, distribution, publicity, and content, and stated prolific authors like himself should take charge of their own destiny.

Adler regularly blogged for The Huffington Post and was the sponsor of a visiting writer series at the New York university department of creative writing. He was a member of the Authors Guild, PEN America, the Dramatists Guild and the Writers Guild of America.

== The War of the Roses ==
The stage play has premiered internationally in Belgium, Italy, Germany, Denmark, Czech Republic, Norway, Iceland, Argentina, Chile, Mexico, Uruguay, France, Brazil, and Netherlands. A Broadway production is planned.

== Fiona Fitzgerald series ==
This mystery series revolves around Fiona Fitzgerald, a woman in her 30s who was born into the illustrious family of a New York senator but chose to break away and become a homicide detective.

American Quartet is the first book, and it was not originally planned as a series until the New York Times listed the novel on its list of "Notable Crime Fiction" in December 1982, and calling it "high-class suspense." Following American Quartet, Fiona embarks on a long journey of harrowing cases throughout eight other books. American Sextet deals with a sex scandal involving six of the most important individuals in Washington D.C. Immaculate Deception deals with a congresswoman who is an anti-abortion supporter—she is not only found dead, but pregnant. The Witch of Watergate focuses on the death of a gossip columnist, who is discovered hanging from a balcony in the Watergate apartment complex. Senator Love is about a womanizing senator whose lover is found murdered. Ties That Bind focuses on a sado-masochistic killing in a Washington D.C. hotel. The Death of a Washington Madame is about the murder of one of Washington D.C.'s most important hostesses. And in Washington Masquerade, the latest novel in the series, Fiona unravels the death of a prominent Washington Post political columnist and fierce critic of the administration.

== Personal life ==
Adler's three children are David, Jonathan, and Michael, an actor.

On April 15, 2019, Warren died of liver cancer in his Manhattan apartment. He was 91.

== Bibliography ==
=== Novels ===
- Undertow (a.k.a. Options, 1974)
- Banquet Before Dawn (1976)
- The Henderson Equation (1976)
- Trans-Siberian Express (1977)
- The Casanova Embrace (1978)
- Natural Enemies (1979)
- Blood Ties (1979)
- The War of the Roses (1981)
- Random Hearts (1984)
- Twilight Child (1985)
- We Are Holding the President Hostage (1986)
- Madeline's Miracles (1989)
- Private Lies (1991)
- The Housewife Blues (1992)
- Mourning Glory (2001)
- Cult (2002)
- The Children of the Roses (2004)
- Funny Boys (2008)
- The David Embrace (2010)
- Empty Treasures (2010)
- Flanagan's Dolls (2010)
- The Womanizer (2010)
- Residue (2010)
- The Serpent's Bite (2012)
- Target Churchill (with James C. Humes, 2013)
- Treadmill (2014)
- Torture Man (2015)
- Mother Nile (2016)
- Heart of Gold (2017)
- Finding Grace: Captured by a Cult (2017)
- High Noon in Hollywood (2018)
- The Norma Conquest (2018)
- Last Call (2018)

=== Short stories ===
- The Sunset Gang (1977)
- Never Too Late for Love (1995)
- Jackson Hole: Uneasy Eden (1997)
- The Washington Dossier Diaries (2007)
- New York Echoes (2008)
- Warren Adler Short Story Contest Winners (2010)
- New York Echoes 2 (2011)
- New York Echoes 1 (2016)
- New York Echoes 3 (2018)

=== The Fiona Fitzgerald Mysteries ===
- American Quartet (1981)
- American Sextet (1982)
- Death of a Washington Madame (2005)
- The Witch of Watergate (1992)
- Senator Love (1991)
- Immaculate Deception (1991)
- The Ties That Bind(1994)
- Washington Masquerade (2013)
- Red Herring (2016)
