= Desert Desperadoes =

1959 film directed by Steve Sekely

- Directed by: Steve Sekely
- Written by: Victor Stoloff; Robert Hill
- Produced by: John Nasht; Robert Spafford; Alan Furlan
- Cinematography: Massimo Dallamano
- Music by: Mario Nascimbene
- Production companies: Venturini Express; Nasht Productions
- Distributed by: RKO Radio Pictures; States Rights Independent Exchanges
- Release date: July 16, 1959 (US)
- Running time: 81 minutes
- Countries: United States; Italy
- Language: English

Desert Desperadoes (Italian: La peccatrice del deserto) is a 1959 American/Italian Biblical drama film directed by Steve Sekely from an original screenplay by Victor Stoloff and Robert Hill. Co-produced by the Italian company Venturini Express and the American studio Nasht Productions, it was distributed by RKO Radio Pictures through the States Rights Independent Exchanges and released on July 16, 1959. The film stars Ruth Roman and Akim Tamiroff.

== Plot ==
A merchant's caravan led by Verrus, a former Roman soldier, comes across a beautiful woman bound to a post. The merchant does not wish to intervene, but Verrus takes her along. She is mysterious, identifying herself only as Isthar, a name that may or may not be real.

The merchant is transporting gold, spices and other valuable commodities across the desert. When a band of refugees and a small child who might be the rumored messiah need sanctuary, Verrus agrees, even though King Herod's soldiers are likely to come after them. The merchant conspires behind Verrus's back, coaxing Isthar into distracting Fabius Quintus, a guard who has become infatuated with her beauty.

Isthar is later in need of help and pleads with Fabius, who spurns and injures her. Nobody else but the refugees will help her. Herod's soldiers attack, so Isthar gives up her own camels to the infant's mother, remaining behind. She, along with all the others, is killed, but the child is safe.

== Cast ==
- Ruth Roman as The woman
- Akim Tamiroff as The merchant
- Otello Toso as Verrus
- Gianni Musy as Fabius (credited as Gianni Glori)
- Arnoldo Foà as The Chaldean
- Alan Furlan as Rais
- Nino Marchetti as Metullus

== Reception ==
Harrison's Reports gave the picture an indifferent review. They enjoyed the background story, as well as the action sequences, but felt the overall plot was routine. They gave good marks to Ruth Roman and Akim Tamiroff for their performances.
