= Song of the Land =

1953 film by Henry S. Kesler

- Directed by: Henry S. Kesler
- Screenplay by: Joseph Henry Steele
- Story by: F. Herrick Herrick; Henry S. Kesler
- Produced by: Henry S. Kesler; Joseph Henry Steele
- Cinematography: Ed N. Harrison; Frances Roberts
- Edited by: Henry S. Kesler
- Music by: Serge Dupré
- Production company: Henry S. Kesler Productions
- Distributed by: United Artists
- Release date: November 27, 1953
- Running time: 71 minutes
- Country: United States
- Language: English

Song of the Land is a 1953 American documentary film directed by Henry S. Kesler and written by Joseph Henry Steele. The film was released on November 17, 1953, by United Artists.
