= Barricade (1950 film) =

1950 film by Peter Godfrey

- Theatrical release poster
- Directed by: Peter Godfrey
- Screenplay by: William Sackheim
- Produced by: Saul Elkins
- Starring: Dane Clark; Raymond Massey; Ruth Roman; Robert Douglas; Morgan Farley; Walter Coy
- Cinematography: Carl E. Guthrie
- Edited by: Clarence Kolster
- Music by: William Lava
- Production company: Warner Bros. Pictures
- Distributed by: Warner Bros. Pictures
- Release date: March 24, 1950 (New York)
- Running time: 77 minutes
- Country: United States
- Language: English

Barricade is a 1950 American Technicolor Western film directed by Peter Godfrey, written by William Sackheim and starring Dane Clark, Raymond Massey, Ruth Roman, Robert Douglas, Morgan Farley and Walter Coy. The film's plot and characters are based on the 1941 film The Sea Wolf, which is in turn based on the novel by author Jack London.

== Plot ==
Gold-mine operator "Boss" Kruger runs his mine like a prison colony. Most of his workers, including Judith Burns and Bob Peters, are fugitives from justice. Judith and Bob befriend lawyer Aubrey Milburn, who seeks to prove that Kruger is a murderer.

== Cast ==
- Dane Clark as Bob Peters
- Raymond Massey as Boss Kruger
- Ruth Roman as Judith Burns
- Robert Douglas as Aubrey Milburn
- Morgan Farley as The Judge
- Walter Coy as Benson
- George Stern as Tippy
- Robert Griffin as Kirby
- Frank Marlowe as Brandy
- Tony Martínez as Peso

== Reception ==
In a contemporary review for The New York Times, critic Bosley Crowther wrote:

Pardon this weary reviewer if he stops once or twice through this ·review to pat a little linament [sic] on his throbbing flesh. He has just come away from seeing the Warners' "Barricade," ... and he feels just as though he is covered with lumps and contusions, even though no one actually has laid a hand upon him. It is simply because this picture is so full of fist-flinging fights that to watch it and to listen to the sound-track is ultimately to feel oneself beat up. As a matter of fact, a calm observer of the passing events in this film can find little other reason for it than a glorification of mayhem. ... If this served some fair dramatic purpose one might conceivably endure the raw exhibitions of brutality that are the singular substance of this film—the knockdown and drag-out slugging matches, the slappings and beatings of terrified men and the two or three ugly demonstrations of the viciousness of the human pack. But it doesn't. It only serves to show off sadism and cold brutality.
