= On Air with Ryan Seacrest =

American syndicated radio program

On Air With Ryan Seacrest
- Genre: Comedy, Talk, Music
- Running time: 5 hours (including commercials; on KIIS-FM); 3–4 hours (syndicated)
- Country of origin: United States
- Home station: KIIS-FM
- Syndicates: Premiere Networks
- Starring: Ryan Seacrest; Sisanie; Tanya Rad; Patty Rodriguez; Manny Streetz
- Announcer: Miles Hvliko
- Created by: Ryan Seacrest
- Produced by: Patty Rodriguez; Jennifer Sawalha
- Executive producers: Ryan Seacrest; Mark Mohelnitzky
- Original release: 2004 (at KIIS-FM); 2008 (Syndication) – Present
- Website: onairwithryan.com

On Air with Ryan Seacrest is a weekday syndicated radio program hosted by Ryan Seacrest. It was launched in 2004 as a drive time show at the same time on Los Angeles Top 40 station 102.7 KIIS-FM as the television show with the same name, although Seacrest had hosted a similar show in afternoon drive time on sister station Star 98.7 KYSR from 1995 until 2003. The TV series ran for several months in 2004, but nationwide syndication of the radio program did not start until 2008. While Seacrest hosted his Los Angeles show in the morning, the syndicated show's affiliates aired it in middays or afternoons. The syndicated show took segments from Seacrest's live Los Angeles wake up show and packaged them with music, so listeners in other cities could hear them later in the day or the following day. The live radio show originated its broadcast from the KIIS-FM studios in Burbank, California. KIIS-FM is owned by iHeartMedia, Inc.

Seacrest began working in New York City on May 1, 2017, as co-host of the syndicated talk show Live with Kelly and Ryan, and the KIIS-FM radio program continues to air live from 9 AM to 1 PM Eastern Time (ET) / 6 to 10 AM Pacific Time (PT), with Seacrest currently broadcasting from a studio at the facilities of WABC-TV (where Live is produced). While he is on live TV, prerecorded discussions and bits air on KIIS-FM from 9 to 10 AM (ET) / 6 to 7 AM (PT), with his staff supplying live weather and traffic reports. After 10 AM (ET) / 7 AM (PT), Seacrest is heard live on KIIS-FM from the Manhattan studio. On Air with Ryan Seacrest is syndicated through an iHeart subsidiary, Premiere Networks. It is heard on over 130 radio stations in the United States and Canada.

== History ==
Logo from 2004 to 2014

The radio program, which initially featured newscaster and sidekick Ellen K., includes many popular segments such as Manny Streetz, Ginger Chan with Traffic and "60 Seconds of Sleaze" featuring entertainment news segment provided by Ellen K. This segment was actually originated by Seacrest's predecessor on KIIS-FM, Rick Dees, in a segment called "Dees Sleaze." One of the most popular segments is called "Ryan's Roses" where listeners call in with the suspicion that their significant other may either have cheated or is considering it. A staff member then calls the accused cheater imitating a florist who wishes to offer them a dozen free roses to be sent to anybody of their choosing. Often the accused cheater will send the flowers to the "wrong person," which may result in the "truth" pouring out and an argument between the couple, moderated by Seacrest. This segment is based on the common radio skit War of the Roses, which has been used on many radio shows around the country since the mid-1990s.

On October 7, 2015, Ellen K announced she was leaving the show to launch her own morning show on co-owned 103.5 KOST, beginning October 19. Her last broadcast on Seacrest's show was on October 16, 2015.

Following departure from the show, Ellen was replaced by former KIIS-FM midday DJ Sisanie (who was also the substitute host for her on occasional days). Sisanie's selection was officially announced on December 4, 2015, during the KIIS Jingle Ball 2015.

On May 1, 2017, Seacrest was named the new co-host of the syndicated television talk show Live with Kelly, which is broadcast weekdays from New York. To accommodate Seacrest's move, a new Manhattan studio was constructed within the facilities of WABC-TV where Live originates.

Seacrest renewed his contract with iHeartMedia in September 2021, an agreement that would take him through his 30th anniversary with the company (counting his KYSR show and the current program) in 2025.

=== Foreign markets ===
- In May 2014, the show hit the airwaves for the first time in Bangkok, Thailand, on Cool Celsius 91.5, and then aired every weekday from 7 - 10 a.m.
- In 2008, Singapore's 987FM was the first station outside the United States to air the program, around November 2010. It later aired on Kiss 92FM from 8 p.m. to midnight on weeknights until January 2016.
- From June 2010, this show aired on the Malaysia radio station, Fly FM weekdays from 11 p.m. to 2 a.m. Previously, this show was aired from 1 to 4 pm weekdays.
- In Dubai, United Arab Emirates, this show airs on Virgin Radio every Sunday to Thursday from noon to 2 p.m; it also re-airs from 10 pm to midnight.
- On Air is also broadcast in Canada on several radio stations, particularly the Move Radio stations and CHUM-FM in Toronto.
- In South Africa the show is broadcast on 94.5 KFM in the Western Cape every weekday from 7 – 10 p.m.
- In Namibia, the show is broadcast in most large towns and cities across the country by Windhoek based radio network, RadioWave weekdays from 6 – 10 p.m.
- In the Dominican Republic, Seacrest's show is broadcast on Be 99.7 everyday from noon to 4 p.m.
- In the United Kingdom, Seacrest's show is broadcast on Heat Radio each weekday afternoon. Seacrest's show was first broadcast on the Real Radio network weeknights at 10 p.m. from 2011 until 2013.
- In Lebanon, the show airs weekdays noon – 3 p.m. on Virgin Radio (previously, it aired on 105.5 Radio One until 2015).
- In Jordan, the show airs on Beat FM.
- In China, the program airs on Beijing People's Broadcasting Station's METRO Radio/FM 94.5 MHz from May 18, 2015. The show can be heard from 10 a.m. to 2 p.m. on weekdays.
- In India, the show airs on Bangalore's Radio Indigo 91.9 weekdays from noon to 2 p.m.

== Segments ==
- Ryan's Roses - Listeners call in with the suspicion that their significant other is cheating or considering it. An 'On Air' staff member then calls the accused cheater imitating a florist who wishes to offer them a dozen free roses to be sent to anybody of their choosing. Often the accused cheater will send the flowers to the "wrong person," which may result in the "truth" pouring out and an argument between the couple, moderated by Seacrest. This segment is based on the common radio skit "War of the Roses," which has been used on many radio shows around the country since the mid-1990s. This segment uses vocal actors/actresses to portray florists or other characters.
- Tell Me Something Good - Listeners call and explain something good that has happened in their lives.
- 60 Seconds of Sleaze - A minute of gossip and celebrity news.
