= List of 1989 box office number-one films in the United States =

This is a list of films which have placed number one at the weekend box office in the United States during 1989.

== Number-one films ==
| † | This implies the highest-grossing movie of the year. |

| # | Weekend end date | Film | Box office | Notes | Ref |
|---|---|---|---|---|---|
| 1 | January 8, 1989 | Rain Man | $9,245,626 | | |
| 2 | January 15, 1989 | Rain Man | $10,111,504 | | |
| 3 | January 22, 1989 | Rain Man | $7,003,147 | | |
| 4 | January 29, 1989 | Rain Man | $6,829,705 | | |
| 5 | February 5, 1989 | Three Fugitives | $5,477,051 | Three Fugitives reached #1 in its second weekend of release. | |
| 6 | February 12, 1989 | The Fly II | $6,751,371 | | |
| 7 | February 20, 1989^{4-day weekend} | The 'Burbs | $11,101,197 | The 'Burbs had the largest opening weekend for February and the largest first quarter opening. | |
| 8 | February 26, 1989 | The 'Burbs | $6,024,480 | | |
| 9 | March 5, 1989 | Lean on Me | $5,032,605 | | |
| 10 | March 12, 1989 | Lean on Me | $4,579,440 | | |
| 11 | March 19, 1989 | Fletch Lives | $8,045,760 | | |
| 12 | March 26, 1989 | Fletch Lives | $5,647,320 | | |
| 13 | April 2, 1989 | Rain Man | $5,537,165 | Rain Man reclaimed #1 in sixteenth weekend of release. | |
| 14 | April 9, 1989 | Major League | $8,836,265 | | |
| 15 | April 16, 1989 | Major League | $7,070,809 | | |
| 16 | April 23, 1989 | Pet Sematary | $12,046,179 | Pet Sematary broke Friday the 13th: The Final Chapter's record ($11.1 million) for the highest weekend debut in April. | |
| 17 | April 30, 1989 | Pet Sematary | $8,380,098 | | |
| 18 | May 7, 1989 | Pet Sematary | $6,338,594 | | |
| 19 | May 14, 1989 | See No Evil, Hear No Evil | $7,098,741 | | |
| 20 | May 21, 1989 | See No Evil, Hear No Evil | $6,105,120 | | |
| 21 | May 29, 1989^{4-day weekend} | Indiana Jones and the Last Crusade | $37,031,573 | Indiana Jones and the Last Crusade broke Indiana Jones and the Temple of Doom's records ($33.9 million) for the 4-day highest Memorial Day weekend debut as well as for the highest weekend debut of all-time. | |
| 22 | June 4, 1989 | Indiana Jones and the Last Crusade | $21,230,164 | Biggest second weekend gross of all-time surpassing Return of the Jedi's $17.2 million. | |
| 23 | June 11, 1989 | Star Trek V: The Final Frontier | $17,375,648 | Star Trek V: The Final Frontier broke Star Trek IV: The Voyage Home's record ($16.8 million) for the highest weekend debut for a film based on a television show. | |
| 24 | June 18, 1989 | Ghostbusters II | $29,472,894 | Ghostbusters II set a record 3-day weekend surpassing Indiana Jones and the Last Crusades record $29,355,021 set 3 weeks earlier. | |
| 25 | June 25, 1989 | Batman † | $40,489,746 | Batman broke Indiana Jones and the Last Crusade's record ($37 million) for the highest weekend debut of all time (which had been set one month earlier). It also broke Superman II's record ($14.1 million) for the highest weekend debut for a superhero film and Cobra's record ($15.6 million) for highest weekend debut for a Warner Bros. film. It had the highest weekend debut of 1989. | |
| 26 | July 2, 1989 | Batman † | $30,075,189 | Batman broke Indiana Jones and the Last Crusade's record ($21.2 million) for the highest second weekend gross (which had been set one month earlier). | |
| 27 | July 9, 1989 | Lethal Weapon 2 | $20,388,800 | | |
| 28 | July 16, 1989 | Lethal Weapon 2 | $17,188,126 | | |
| 29 | July 23, 1989 | Lethal Weapon 2 | $13,022,249 | | |
| 30 | July 30, 1989 | Turner & Hooch | $12,211,042 | | |
| 31 | August 6, 1989 | Parenthood | $10,506,450 | | |
| 32 | August 13, 1989 | Parenthood | $9,672,350 | | |
| 33 | August 20, 1989 | Uncle Buck | $8,794,501 | | |
| 34 | August 27, 1989 | Uncle Buck | $6,725,275 | | |
| 35 | September 4, 1989^{4-day weekend} | Uncle Buck | $7,822,640 | | |
| 36 | September 10, 1989 | Uncle Buck | $4,550,887 | | |
| 37 | September 17, 1989 | Sea of Love | $10,017,840 | Sea of Love broke Crocodile Dundee's record ($8 million) for the highest weekend debut in September. | |
| 38 | September 24, 1989 | Black Rain | $9,677,102 | | |
| 39 | October 1, 1989 | Black Rain | $6,503,065 | | |
| 40 | October 9, 1989^{4-day weekend} | Black Rain | $6,100,000 | | |
| 41 | October 15, 1989 | Look Who's Talking | $12,107,784 | Look Who's Talking broke Never Say Never Again's 1983 record ($11 million) for the highest weekend debut for a film released during the month of October. | |
| 42 | October 22, 1989 | Look Who's Talking | $14,147,340 | Look Who's Talking sets another record weekend gross for the month of October. | |
| 43 | October 29, 1989 | Look Who's Talking | $11,556,750 | | |
| 44 | November 5, 1989 | Look Who's Talking | $11,457,810 | | |
| 45 | November 12, 1989 | Look Who's Talking | $11,409,873 | | |
| 46 | November 19, 1989 | Harlem Nights | $16,096,808 | Biggest pre-holiday fall opening. In third place, The Little Mermaid's opening ($6 million) broke The Fox and the Hound's record ($4.2 million) for the highest weekend debut for a Walt Disney Animation Studios film. | |
| 47 | November 26, 1989 | Back to the Future Part II | $27,835,125 | Back to the Future Part II broke Rocky IV's record ($19.9 million) for the highest Thanksgiving weekend debut. | |
| 48 | December 3, 1989 | Back to the Future Part II | $12,110,340 | | |
| 49 | December 10, 1989 | The War of the Roses | $9,488,794 | | |
| 50 | December 17, 1989 | National Lampoon's Christmas Vacation | $7,233,119 | National Lampoon's Christmas Vacation reached #1 in its third weekend of release. | |
| 51 | December 24, 1989 | National Lampoon's Christmas Vacation | $7,007,789 | | |
| 52 | December 31, 1989 | The War of the Roses | $10,490,781 | The War of the Roses reclaimed #1 in fourth weekend of release. | |

== Highest-grossing films ==
=== Calendar gross ===
Highest-grossing films of 1989 for tickets sold within the calendar year

| Rank | Title | Studio(s) | Actor(s) | Director(s) | Gross |
|---|---|---|---|---|---|
| 1. | Batman | Warner Bros. Pictures | Jack Nicholson, Michael Keaton, Kim Basinger, Robert Wuhl, Pat Hingle, Billy Dee Williams, Michael Gough and Jack Palance | Tim Burton | $251,188,924 |
| 2. | Indiana Jones and the Last Crusade | Paramount Pictures | Harrison Ford, Denholm Elliott, Alison Doody, John Rhys-Davies, Julian Glover and Sean Connery | Steven Spielberg | $197,171,806 |
| 3. | Lethal Weapon 2 | Warner Bros. Pictures | Mel Gibson, Danny Glover, Joe Pesci, Joss Ackland, Derrick O'Connor and Patsy Kensit | Richard Donner | $147,253,986 |
| 4. | Rain Man | Metro-Goldwyn-Mayer | Dustin Hoffman, Tom Cruise and Valeria Golino | Barry Levinson | $139,602,956 |
| 5. | Honey, I Shrunk the Kids | Walt Disney Studios | Rick Moranis, Matt Frewer, Marcia Strassman and Kristine Sutherland | Joe Johnston | $130,724,172 |
| 6. | Look Who's Talking | TriStar Pictures | John Travolta, Kirstie Alley, Olympia Dukakis, George Segal, Abe Vigoda and Bruce Willis | Amy Heckerling | $113,455,801 |
| 7. | Ghostbusters II | Columbia Pictures | Bill Murray, Dan Aykroyd, Sigourney Weaver, Harold Ramis, Rick Moranis, Ernie Hudson and Annie Potts | Ivan Reitman | $112,494,738 |
| 8. | Dead Poets Society | Walt Disney Studios | Robin Williams, Robert Sean Leonard, Ethan Hawke, Josh Charles, Gale Hansen, Norman Lloyd and Kurtwood Smith | Peter Weir | $95,860,116 |
| 9. | Parenthood | Universal Pictures | Steve Martin, Tom Hulce, Rick Moranis, Martha Plimpton, Keanu Reeves, Jason Robards, Mary Steenburgen and Dianne Wiest | Ron Howard | $95,527,843 |
| 10. | Back to the Future Part II | Universal Pictures | Michael J. Fox, Christopher Lloyd, Lea Thompson, Thomas F. Wilson, Elisabeth Shue and Jeffrey Weissman | Robert Zemeckis | $93,592,195 |

=== In-Year Release ===
Highest-grossing films of 1989 by In-year release
| Rank | Title | Distributor | Domestic gross |
|---|---|---|---|
| 1. | Batman | Warner Bros. | $251,188,924 |
| 2. | Indiana Jones and the Last Crusade | Paramount | $197,171,806 |
| 3. | Lethal Weapon 2 | Warner Bros. | $147,253,986 |
| 4. | Look Who's Talking | TriStar | $140,088,813 |
| 5. | Honey, I Shrunk the Kids | Disney | $130,724,172 |
| 6. | Back to the Future Part II | Universal | $118,450,002 |
| 7. | Ghostbusters II | Columbia | $112,494,738 |
| 8. | Driving Miss Daisy | Warner Bros. | $106,593,296 |
| 9. | Parenthood | Universal | $100,047,830 |
| 10. | Dead Poets Society | Disney | $95,860,116 |

Highest-grossing films by MPAA rating of 1989
| G | The Little Mermaid |
| PG | Honey, I Shrunk the Kids |
| PG-13 | Batman |
| R | Lethal Weapon 2 |

== See also ==
- List of American films — American films by year
- Lists of box office number-one films

== Chronology ==
| Preceded by 1988 | 1989 | Succeeded by 1990 |
