= Jeanne Cooper =

American actress (1928–2013)

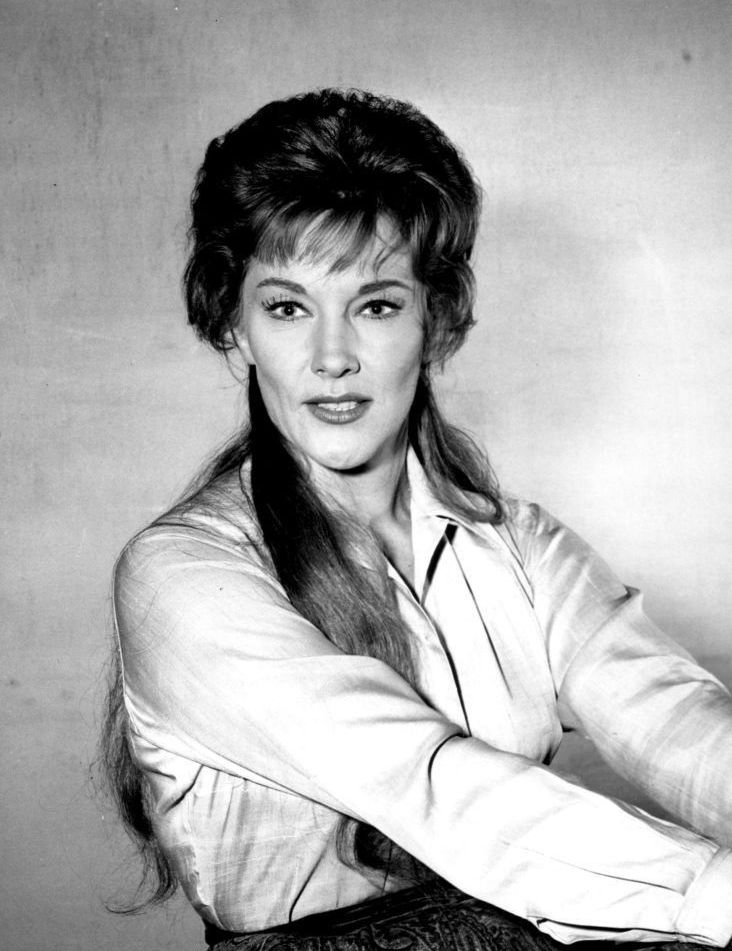
- Cooper in 1964
- Born: Wilma Jeanne Cooper; October 25, 1928; Taft, California, U.S.
- Died: May 8, 2013 (aged 84); Los Angeles, California, U.S.
- Occupation: Actress
- Years active: 1953–2013
- Known for: Katherine Chancellor on The Young and the Restless
- Spouse(s): Harry Bernsen, Jr. (m. 1954; div. 1977)
- Children: 3, including Corbin Bernsen
- Awards: Hollywood Walk of Fame

Wilma Jeanne Cooper (October 25, 1928 – May 8, 2013) was an American actress, best known for her role as Katherine Chancellor on the CBS soap opera The Young and the Restless (1973–2013). At the time of her death, she had played Katherine for nearly 40 years, and her name appears on the list of longest-serving soap opera actors in the United States.

Cooper also appeared on numerous episodic television series in the 1950s and 1960s, as well as several film roles. She was the mother of three children, the eldest being actor Corbin Bernsen.

== Early life ==
Wilma Jeanne Cooper was born on October 25, 1928, in Taft, California, the youngest of three children of Albert Troy Cooper and his wife, the former Sildeth Evelyn Moore. The family lived in Kern County for several years, first in Taft until 1942 and then in Bakersfield. Her mother died on August 21, 1944, the year before Jeanne graduated from Taft Union High School. Her father lived for several more decades, dying on April 11, 1986.

== Career ==
=== Film and television work ===
Cooper began her screen acting career in the 1950s after signing a contract with Universal Studios, performing initially as a supporting player in films with stars like Maureen O'Hara, Glenn Ford, Tony Curtis, and Henry Fonda. Her first film role was as Myra in the 1953 western film, The Redhead from Wyoming. She later appeared in small roles in The Man from the Alamo, Over-Exposed, 5 Steps to Danger, Rock All Night, House of Women, 13 West Street, The Intruder, Black Zoo, The Glory Guys, Tony Rome, The Boston Strangler and Kansas City Bomber.

Cooper was a fixture on episodic television throughout the 1950s and 1960s. In 1956, she was cast as Mrs. Hinton in "The Rabbi Davis Story" of the religious anthology series, Crossroads. That same year, she portrayed Louise Douglas in "Girl Bandit" of Broderick Crawford's syndicated crime drama, Highway Patrol. She also appeared in the Wagon Train episode titled "The Whipping" and as Marie Conover in the 1957 Cheyenne episode titled "Top Hand" starring Clint Walker.

Cooper played Ann Dix in the 1955 episode "I Am Joaquin" of the syndicated western anthology series, Death Valley Days, hosted by Stanley Andrews. In the storyline, Ann searches with ultimate success for eight years for the return of her young daughter whom the Mexican bandit Joaquin Murrieta (Cliff Fields) left at a Roman Catholic church after he boarded a ship and stabbed to death the girl's father, Capt. Stephen Dix, played by John Damler.

In 1957, she starred in one of the early episodes of two different western series, NBC's Tales of Wells Fargo starring Dale Robertson, in the role of the woman bandit Belle Starr, and two episodes on ABC’s Maverick; in 1959, she portrayed Duchess in a second Tales of Wells Fargo episode, "Clay Allison". In 1958, she was cast in the episode "Wheel of Fortune" of the NBC western series, Jefferson Drum, starring Jeff Richards as a newspaper publisher. Also in 1958, Cooper appeared as Lucy in the "Sundown at Bitter Creek" episode of the CBS western anthology series, Dick Powell's Zane Grey Theatre. She guest starred as love interest Myra in Wanted Dead or Alive starring Steve McQueen in S2 E14 "Man on Horseback", which aired 12/3/1959.

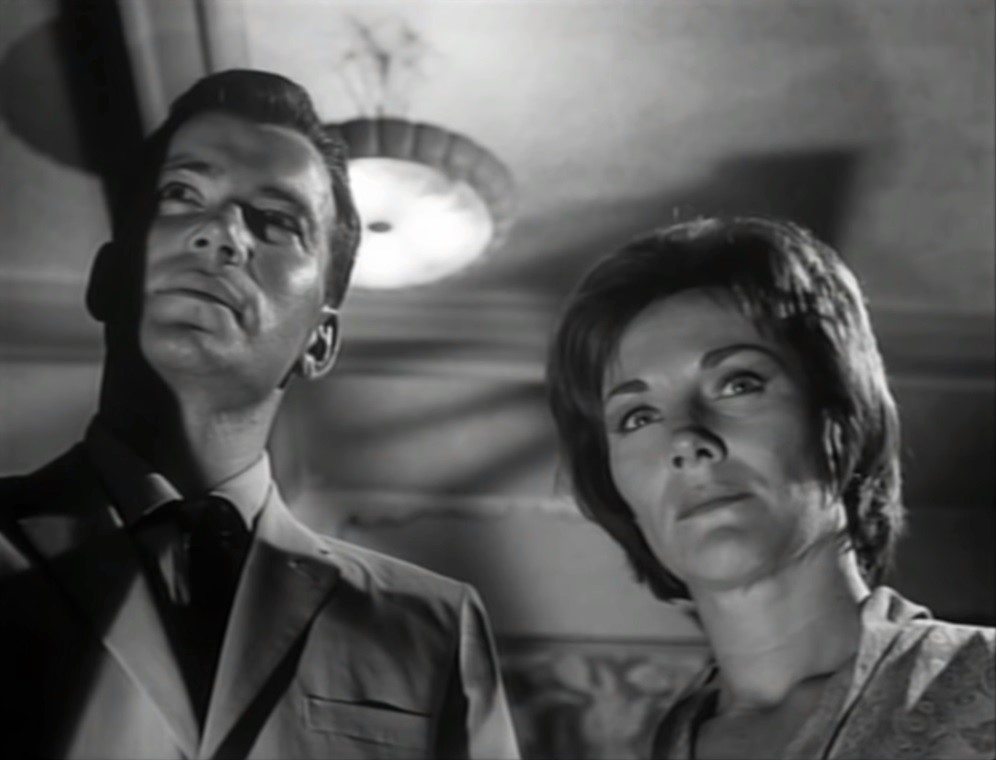
William Shatner and Jeanne Cooper in The Intruder (1962)

In 1960, she again played Belle Starr in the "Shadow of Jesse James" episode of the TV series Bronco starring Ty Hardin. Cooper made five guest appearances during the nine-year run of CBS's Perry Mason starring Raymond Burr, beginning with the role of Laura Beaumont in the 1958 episode, "The Case of the Corresponding Corpse." In the final season of the show, she made her fifth and final appearance as defendant Miriam Fielding in the 1966 episode, "The Case of the Vanishing Victim". In 1962, Cooper earned her first Emmy nomination for her performance in Ben Casey. She appeared as a regular on NBC's Bracken's World series about the movie business. She also appeared in episodes of The Twilight Zone, Hawaii Five-O, Mannix, Ironside, Storefront Lawyers, The Silent Force, Touched by an Angel, Gunsmoke, and The Untouchables, among numerous other series.

In 1965, she appeared in the ABC network's Western television series The Big Valley as Elaine Baxter Jason, a mercantile store owner and an old friend of series character Victoria Barkley (Barbara Stanwyck). In another episode she appears as the money-hungry aunt of Heath (Lee Majors). Her husband was portrayed in the episode by John Anderson.

=== The Young and the Restless ===
Cooper is best known for her role as Katherine Chancellor on the daytime soap opera The Young and the Restless. Her character broke ground in the daytime medium; Katherine endured several bouts with alcoholism, ischemic stroke, and the loss of many men in her life (four late husbands, and a child surrendered for adoption).

In 1984, Katherine (and Cooper) also had a facelift on national television (Cooper had pitched the idea of having a live facelift to CBS executives, who agreed to write the facelift into the show).

For many years, the story of Katherine's bitter rivalry with character Jill Foster Abbott (originally portrayed by Brenda Dickson, and more recently by Jess Walton) was a mainstay of the show. A 2003 storyline suggested Jill was Katherine's daughter born out of wedlock, but further story developments in 2009 cast doubt on that assertion, and the long-bitter enemies were found not to be mother and daughter after all.

Cooper received ten Daytime Emmy nominations, nine for Outstanding Lead Actress and one for Outstanding Supporting Actress, and two Primetime Emmy nominations. She received a Lifetime Achievement Award from the Daytime Emmys in 2004. For her contributions to television, Cooper received a star on the Hollywood Walk of Fame, which is located at 6801 Hollywood Blvd. She won the 2008 Daytime Emmy Award for Outstanding Lead Actress in a Drama Series. This was her first competitive win; she had first been nominated in 1989.

Cooper's character, Katherine, was thought to have died in a November 2008 episode. It was, however, her look-alike, Marge, who died, and Katherine had experienced memory issues due to the car accident that took Marge's life.

Cooper had to take a medical leave in October 2011 and her part on the soap was temporarily recast with veteran actress Michael Learned. However, the next month, Cooper confirmed she was returning to the set. She returned as part of the show on December 23, 2011. She taped her last scene on the show in March 2013 on the same day as the Young and the Restless 40th anniversary and this scene aired on May 3, 2013, five days before her death.

A tribute episode of The Young and the Restless in honor of Jeanne Cooper, made up of clips, cast memories and interviews, was shown on May 28, 2013, on CBS. Her character, Katherine, died offscreen a few months later after a trip around the world.

== Personal life ==
Cooper married television producer Harry Bernsen, Jr., and they were together for 23 years before divorcing. In her book (released on July 31, 2012), Cooper makes it known that after their divorce, she and her ex-husband very rarely saw each other (only when family functions dictated) and they were not close or even friends before his death on May 31, 2008.

The Bernsens had three children, all of whom are actors: Corbin Bernsen of L.A. Law fame (born September 7, 1954), whose mother Cooper portrayed twice on that series; Collin Bernsen, born March 30, 1958; and Caren Bernsen, born August 17, 1960.

== Death ==
In 2013, shortly after a round of promotion for the Y&R 40th anniversary, Cooper became ill due to an infection. She died on May 8, 2013, in a Los Angeles hospital. In addition to the infection, Cooper had been a heavy smoker most of her adult life and suffered from chronic obstructive pulmonary disease. Her final Y&R scene was taped March 26, 2013 (the exact date of Y&R's 40th anniversary) and aired on May 3, 2013. “Mom passed this morning”, her son, Corbin Bernsen, revealed on Twitter the day of her death. “She was in peace and without fear.”

== Awards and nominations ==
- Emmy Award
  - 1962 — Primetime Emmy Award for Outstanding Supporting Actress in a Drama Series — Ben Casey (Nominated)
  - 1987 — Primetime Emmy Award for Outstanding Guest Actress in a Drama Series — L.A. Law (Nominated)
  - 1989 — Daytime Emmy Award for Outstanding Lead Actress in a Drama Series - The Young and the Restless (Nominated)
  - 1990 — Daytime Emmy Award for Outstanding Lead Actress in a Drama Series - The Young and the Restless (Nominated)
  - 1991 — Daytime Emmy Award for Outstanding Lead Actress in a Drama Series - The Young and the Restless (Nominated)
  - 1992 — Daytime Emmy Award for Outstanding Lead Actress in a Drama Series - The Young and the Restless (Nominated)
  - 1999 — Daytime Emmy Award for Outstanding Lead Actress in a Drama Series - The Young and the Restless (Nominated)
  - 2000 — Daytime Emmy Award for Outstanding Lead Actress in a Drama Series - The Young and the Restless (Nominated)
  - 2004 — Lifetime Achievement Award
  - 2005 — Daytime Emmy Award for Outstanding Supporting Actress in a Drama Series - The Young and the Restless (Nominated)
  - 2007 — Daytime Emmy Award for Outstanding Lead Actress in a Drama Series - The Young and the Restless (Nominated)
  - 2008 — Daytime Emmy Award for Outstanding Lead Actress in a Drama Series - The Young and the Restless (Won)
  - 2009 — Daytime Emmy Award for Outstanding Lead Actress in a Drama Series - The Young and the Restless (Nominated)
- Hollywood Walk of Fame
  - 1993 — Star on the Walk of Fame at 6801 Hollywood Blvd.

== Filmography ==
=== Film ===
Year	Film	Role	Notes
1953	The Redhead from Wyoming	Myra	
1953	The Man from the Alamo	Kate Lamar	
1953	Shadows of Tombstone	Marge	
1955	The Naked Street	Evelyn Shriner	Uncredited
1956	The Houston Story	Madge	
1956	Over-Exposed	Renee	
1956	Calling Homicide	Darlene Adams	
1956	Five Steps to Danger	Helen Bethke	
1957	Rock All Night	Mabel	
1957	Plunder Road	Fran Werner	
1958	Screaming Mimi	Lola Lake in Photo	Uncredited
1958	Unwed Mother	Mrs. Horton	
1960	Let No Man Write My Epitaph	Fran	
1962	13 West Street	Mrs. Quinn	
1962	House of Women	Helen Jennings	
1962	The Intruder	Vi Griffin	
1962	Red Nightmare	Helen Donavan	
1963	Black Zoo	Edna Conrad	
1965	The Glory Guys	Mrs. Rachael McCabe	
1967	Tony Rome	Lorna Boyd	
1968	The Boston Strangler	Cloe	
1970	There Was a Crooked Man...	Prostitute	
1972	Kansas City Bomber	Trainer Vivien	
1973	The All-American Boy	Nola Bealer	
1977	The San Pedro Bums	Mrs. McClory	
1991	Lethal Justice	Clerk	
1992	Frozen Assets	Zach Shepard's Mother	
1993	Beyond Suspicion	Renata	
2002	The Tomorrow Man	Jeanine	
2005	Carpool Guy	Mrs. Lunsford	
2009	Donna on Demand	Virginia Hart	
2009	Dead Air	Paranoid Caller	

=== Selected television works ===
Year	Title	Role	Notes
1957–1959	Tales of Wells Fargo	Belle Starr / Duchess	Episodes: "Belle Starr" and "Clay Allison"
1957–1962	Cheyenne	Marie Conover / Mary "Molly" Spenser	Episodes: "Top Hand" and "The Quick and the Deadly"
1958–1966	Perry Mason	Laura Beaumont / Thelma Hill / Ethel Belan / Mary Browne / Miriam Fielding	
1959	The Twilight Zone	Barmaid Miss Smith	Episode: "Mr. Denton on Doomsday"
1959	Wanted Dead or Alive	Myra	Season 2, Episode 14: "Man on Horseback"
1961	The Tall Man	Mrs. Elmira Webster	Episode: "The Reversed Blade"
1961	Rawhide	Mrs. Clara Wilson	Episode: "Incident on the Road Back"
1962	The Untouchables	Fran Cagle	Episode: 'The Case Against Eliot Ness' - Season 3, episode #83
1962	Wagon Train	Donna Fuller	Episode: "The Donna Fuller Story"
1962	Have Gun – Will Travel	Edna Hardin	Season 6, Episode 16: "The Treasure"
1962–1963	Bonanza	Abigal Hinton / Emilia Miller	Episodes: "The Good Samaritan" and "She Walks in Beauty"
1963	Stoney Burke	Loren Schuyler	Episode: "Webb of Fear"
1963	Gunsmoke	Lilly Pitts	Episode: "The Ex-Con"
1963	Mr. Novak	Louise Sargent	Episode: "The Boy Without a Country"
1965	The Big Valley	Martha Simmons	Season 1 Episode 3 / "Boots with My Father's Name"
1965	The Man from U.N.C.L.E.	Mother Fear a.k.a. Yvonne	Episode: "The Children's Day Affair" - Season 2, episode #41
1966	The Big Valley	Elaine Jason	Season 1 Episode 29 / "Tunnel of Gold"
1966–1967	Daniel Boone	Amy Barr / Addie Ogilvie	
1969	Death Valley Days	Rachel Barrett	Season 17, Episode 14: "A Gift" with Valentin de Vargas and Harry Lauter
1973–2013	The Young and the Restless	Katherine Chancellor	1973–2013
1973–2013	The Young and the Restless	Marge Cotrooke	1989–1990, 2008–2009
1973	Hawkins	Mrs. Hamilton	Season 1, Episode 3: "A Life for a Life"
1974	Kolchak: The Night Stalker	Dr. Kline	1 episode (Season 1, Episode 7)
1975	Emergency!	Evelyn Fenady	1 episode (Season 5, Episode 5)
1997	The Nanny	Herself	
2005	The Bold and the Beautiful	Katherine Chancellor	Guest (October 31, 2005 - November 1, 2005)
2009	Guiding Light	Wedding Guest	Guest star
