= Intimacy (1966 film) =

American film by Victor Stoloff

- Directed by: Victor Stoloff
- Written by: Eva Wolas
- Produced by: Victor Stoloff
- Starring: Barry Sullivan; Joan Blackman; Jack Ging; Nancy Malone; Jackie DeShannon
- Cinematography: Ted and Vincent Saizis
- Music by: George Blaskow
- Distributed by: Seven Arts Productions
- Release date: May 1966 (United States)
- Running time: 87 minutes
- Language: English

Intimacy is a 1966 American film directed and produced by Victor Stoloff. It was shot in Birmingham, Alabama during two weeks in January 1965.

== Plot ==
Businessman Walter Nicholson is at risk of bankruptcy and is being threatened with violence from a loan shark. He attempts to secure a lucrative business deal by blackmailing a key government employee, Jim Hawley, who is responsible for deciding who secures the contract. Nicholson hires a freelance film creator to hide a secret camera in Hawley's hotel room in the hope of blackmailing him with compromising footage with local sex worker Carrie Lane. After getting drunk with anticipated excitement, Nicholson reviews the footage the morning after to find Hawley is actually having an affair with his own wife Barbara.

== Cast ==
- Barry Sullivan as Walter Nicholson, a wealthy, corrupt businessman
- Joan Blackman as Barbara Nicholson, false-spouse to Walter Nicholson
- Jack Ging as Jim Hawley, a government employee
- Nancy Malone as Virginia Hawley, the alcoholic wife of Jim
- Jackie DeShannon as Carrie Lane, a local sex worker

== Casting ==
In early 1964, Stuart Whitman was reported to be starring in the lead role, but left after a scene disagreement with Dana Wynter and was reportedly replaced by Fred Beir. Barry Sullivan signed onto the film in August 1964 and later that year, William Shatner was reported to have been signed as the lead role.

Joan Blackman signed for the film in mid-December 1964. Local talent were auditioned for minor roles around the same time. Jack Ging was a late addition to the cast, having replaced Paul Richards a few weeks before filming started, while Madlyn Rhue was also originally set to star but was replaced shortly before filming.

== Production ==
=== Pre-production ===
When reported in early 1964, the film was originally set to star actors Stuart Whitman, Dana Wynter, Cloris Leachman and Albert Salmi with an anticipated shooting time of just three days on a newly developed tape-plus-film process. The script was written by Eva Wolas, who had done a lot of script writing for the anthology series Playhouse 90. Wynter reportedly walked off set after Whitman "blew the scene because the movie script wasn't working out the way it did on paper", although noted several months later that she hoped to still be involved, suggesting in July 1964 that plans were "just about ready" and including "the most delightful nude love scene". Before Birmingham was chosen as the filming location, director Stoloff also visited Montreal, Quebec to consider the possibility of using the city for exterior shots. Birmingham was confirmed as the location in December 1964.

=== Filming ===
The film was shot in Birmingham, Alabama over a two-week period in January 1965. However, the only scene that visibly features the city is an exterior shot of downtown at the beginning of the film, while no mention is made to the filming location within the credits. Producer Jack L. Stoloff and actor Jack Ging praised the hospitality of the local community. Filming primarily took place within the Clark Theater, which was converted into a two-room set for the film, while local photographer brothers Ted and Vincent Saizis provided camera equipment. A Hollywood set construction crew arrived on December 22, 1964, to adapt the stage for movie purposes.

Principal photography began on January 6 and wrapped around January 21, 1965. The relatively short shooting schedule was made possible by conducting rehearsals in Hollywood prior to location filming. Stoloff stated that the film was completed for less than 20% of the typical cost of a Hollywood production, with cooperation of the local population contributing towards cost efficiencies. Reflecting on the experience, he remarked that he had never completed a film as quickly or as economically as Intimacy.

== Release ==
The film was released to theaters during May 1966. A planned premiere at the College Theatre in East Lake, Birmingham, in the area where the film was shot, was cancelled in June due to "unforeseen circumstances".

The film was reissued as The Deceivers. In 1977, it was remade as The Washington Affair.

== Reception ==
Local reporter Emmett Weaver, writing for the Birmingham Post-Herald, regarded the film as being definitely for "adults only", primarily due to a single candid bedroom scene. While praising some dramatic performances from a well-known cast, Emmett felt the script was "contrived" although believed the film would be a financial success due to the low-cost of production. Film critic Colin Bennett, writing for The Age, considered the film as passable, with a clever script that "boasts an ingenious idea".
