= Random Hearts (novel) =

1984 novel by Warren Adler

- Cover to Stonehouse edition of Random Hearts
- Author: Warren Adler
- Language: English
- Genre: Fiction
- Publisher: Stonehouse
- Publication date: 1984
- Publication place: USA
- Media type: Hardcover/Paperback/E-Text
- Pages: 293 pages
- ISBN: 0-02-500290-2 (hardcover)
- OCLC: 10230946
- Dewey Decimal: 813/.54 19
- LC Class: PS3551.D64 R3 1984

Random Hearts is a 1984 novel by American author Warren Adler, who wrote the novel after being moved by the 1982 Air Florida Flight 90 disaster. In 1999, the novel was made into a motion picture directed by Sydney Pollack and starring Harrison Ford and Kristin Scott Thomas.

== Plot summary ==
Vivien Simpson, a housewife with a young son, and Edward Davis, an aide to a congressman, had never met before, but soon they would be inseparable. Their respective spouses, Orson and Lily, had been carrying on an affair for some time. The affair abruptly ended when their plane to Miami crashes moments after take off. Vivien believed her husband was off to Paris for business. Edward thought his wife was in L.A. Once the bodies are identified, the knowledge they were traveling together is imparted to Vivien and Edward.

They are consumed with curiosity, but nobody is alive to answer their questions. All that remains of the clandestine love affair is a set of nearly unidentifiable keys; neither Vivien nor Edward knows what they belong to. They center their lives around discovering what their spouses kept from them while finding themselves slowly becoming closer to each other.
