= The Steel Mirror =

Book by Donald Hamilton

- First edition
- Author: Donald Hamilton
- Language: English
- Genre: Spy novel
- Publisher: Rinehart & Company
- Publication date: 1948
- Publication place: United States
- Media type: Print (hardcover)

The Steel Mirror is a spy novel by Donald Hamilton.

== Plot summary ==
The plot is set in the post-World War II years, with a background of heroism and treachery in Nazi-controlled Europe and paranoia over communism. John Emmett managed to avoid fighting in the war because he was a chemist in a safe but useful state-side post. However, both of his older brothers fought and died in the war, and he has questions about his untested courage.

The novel starts with Emmett stalled out in a small town outside Chicago, his car having died. He is on a cross-country journey to California to a new job. He spots a young woman at the service station and makes a pitch to hitch-hike with her. To his surprise, she agrees. She is Ann Nicholson, and over the course of the novel it is revealed that she is the daughter of a rich industrialist from Chicago, that she was married to a French man before the war, and that during the war, she fought in the French resistance until she was captured and tortured by the Gestapo.

As the car journey continues, Emmett is approached in a diner by a man and woman, who reveal that they are Ann's psychiatrist and his nurse. They were keeping an eye on her in Chicago, but Ann suddenly bolted in the car and started driving cross-country. It is revealed that there was a murder in Chicago, an Army Air Force pilot who knew Ann and her husband in Nazi-controlled France, who had accused her of betraying her resistance group and her husband.

Confronted with this, Ann claims to have amnesia after a point in her interrogation by the Gestapo, and she is driving to New Mexico where a male scientist who was a prisoner in the same interrogation camp with her can maybe tell her what happened and help her remember if she betrayed her husband.

Along the way, Ann reacts badly by an attempt to detain her by a small town sheriff, putting her and Emmett's life at risk. Emmett is resentful of her, attracted to her, pities her, feels admiration for her, and is generally conflicted about his opinion of her. He decides to leave her in a town outside Denver, but changes his mind and returns, only to find her dying of an overdose. She is brought back, and her father and the psychiatrist rally about her, pushing Emmett away. He has more conversations with the nurse and FBI agents and is getting ready to continue on with his journey, but finds that Ann ran away and is hiding out in a fishing camp he had mentioned that he had a reservation for. He goes out to her, and determines that this time he is not leaving her, and he will get her to the scientist in New Mexico to completer her journey. There are people who try to stop them and he brutally attacks one on the road.

Emmett realizes that he has no recognizable stakes in the game, so he bullies Ann into marrying him. Part of the reason is that Ann's father has been considering putting her in a mental hospital to sweep her out of the way for a while, because he is under investigation for war profiteering, and because her father believes she did kill the pilot in Chicago, even though the police have reluctantly stated she is in the clear. By marrying her, Emmett can prevent Ann from being tucked away in a quiet corner and forgotten.

The couple finally make it to New Mexico, and push the FBI into letting Ann visit with the scientist, Dr Kissel, the refugee from Europe. The FBI are interested in Dr Kissel and the people who might be trying to contact him, accusing Ann Nicholson of being a communist agent. The FBI make a show of reluctantly letting Ann meet with Dr Kissel, whereupon he tells her she was brave and did not break, unlike himself. Ann breaks down at that point, and is pulled from the meeting. As they are driving away, Ann tells the FBI agent that Dr Kissel is a fake. Emmett reasons that she couldn't tell that because of appearance, because a half-tortured prisoner will look markedly different from a healthy but damaged person, so she could only know that he is a fake, a communist agent, because she did break and betray her French husband and the resistance. She had been faking her amnesia to try to buy a little time for herself, to prevent the truth from coming out in an instant in Chicago.

The novel ends with Ann shown to be a scared but strong person who broke under torture, Emmett still believing in her and maybe loving her, and her father offering Emmett a job in South America which would get the two out of the country for awhile. The FBI now know that Dr Kissel is a communist agent, and can feed the Soviet Union false information.

== Film adaptation ==
Filmed as 5 Steps to Danger in 1957 starring Ruth Roman and Sterling Hayden.

== Publication history ==
- 1948, US, The Saturday Evening Post, 8/21/1948, 8/28/1948, 9/4/1948, 9/11/1948, 9/18/1948, 9/25/1948, 10/2/1948, 10/9/1948, serial
- 1948, US, Rinehart, hardcover
- 1948, US, Rinehart, Book Club Edition, hardcover
- 1950, US, Dell, Mapback #473, paperback
- 1950, UK, Allan Wingate, hardcover
- 1966, US, Fawcett Gold Medal d1617, paperback
