= Random Hearts =

1999 film by Sydney Pollack

- Theatrical release poster
- Directed by: Sydney Pollack
- Screenplay by: Kurt Luedtke
- Adaptation by: Darryl Ponicsan
- Based on: Random Hearts by Warren Adler
- Produced by: Martin Jurow; Marykay Powell; Ronald L. Schwary
- Starring: Harrison Ford; Kristin Scott Thomas; Charles S. Dutton; Bonnie Hunt; Dennis Haysbert; Richard Jenkins; Paul Guilfoyle
- Cinematography: Philippe Rousselot
- Edited by: William Steinkamp
- Music by: Dave Grusin
- Production companies: Rastar; Mirage Enterprises
- Distributed by: Columbia Pictures (through Sony Pictures Releasing)
- Release date: October 8, 1999
- Running time: 133 minutes
- Country: United States
- Language: English
- Budget: $64 million
- Box office: $74.6 million

Random Hearts is a 1999 American romantic drama film directed by Sydney Pollack, starring Harrison Ford and Kristin Scott Thomas. Based on the 1984 novel by Warren Adler, the film is about a police officer and a congresswoman who discover that their spouses were having an affair prior to being killed in a plane crash. Random Hearts was released by Columbia Pictures (through Sony Pictures Releasing) on October 8, 1999. The film received negative reviews from critics and grossed $74.6 million against a $64 million budget.

== Plot ==
Sergeant William "Dutch" Van Den Broeck is a seasoned police sergeant in the Internal Affairs Division of the Metropolitan Police Department, and Kay Chandler is a congresswoman for New Hampshire running for reelection. Dutch is married to a fashion editor, and Kay is married to a lawyer and has a teenage daughter.

They lead separate lives, unaware of each other's existence, until a fateful plane crash changes everything. Dutch's wife Peyton and Kay's husband Cullen are among the passengers killed in the tragic accident, leaving Dutch and Kay to grapple with their devastating loss.

The plane is bound for Miami but crashes soon after takeoff. Dutch realizes that his wife was on the plane, but strangely, Peyton's employer has no record of Peyton sent to work in Miami by her employer. The airline has no record of her. Dutch assumes that his wife was on the plane as some other man's wife. He concludes that she was having an affair. Representatives from Southern Airlines, whose airline was involved in a crash, show up at Dutch's door. His investigation turns up that Peyton was sitting next to Kay Chandler's husband.

Suspicious of the affair, Dutch meets with Kay to see if she knew about their spouses' relationship. Kay is concerned about the publicity of a scandal during a re-election campaign. Kay is not willing to talk to Dutch and asks him to leave her alone. Undeterred, Dutch pushes on with his investigation, goes to Miami and visits the hotel where he not only discovers that his wife was planning on check in, but that Kay had changed her mind and followed him, wishing to uncover the truth about her husband.

The two begin to talk about their lives and their relationships, including their spouses' infidelity. Kay discusses the possibility of withdrawing from the campaign. They fly back home and share a kiss before parting company. A few days later, Dutch goes to one of Kay's campaign fundraisers and convinces her not to drop out of the race.

Dutch invites Kay to visit him at his cabin near Chesapeake Bay. Initially hesitant, she goes a few days later. The couple spends more time getting to know each other and eventually have sex. However, Dutch is still obsessed about his wife's infidelity and comments that he believes that their spouses may have had an apartment together. Kay encourages him to move on with his life and to let it go.

The stress of his wife's death and affair begins to wear on Dutch. He loses his composure with another police officer and assaults him, leading to his suspension from work. Dutch and Kay separately discover the location of the apartment, but as he finds Kay cleaning out the apartment, they argue with each other before Kay leaves. Dutch chases her into the street in the hopes that he can make amends. However, Dutch is shot by the suspect in his criminal investigation.

Dutch survives the shooting, and the suspect is caught and arrested. The criminal investigation reveals the connection between Dutch and Kay to the world, and the media begins investigating. With rumors about their relationship growing, Kay decides to publicly confirm that she and Dutch are friends, thus leading her to lose her bid for re-election, while Dutch receives his promotion. Kay decides to leave Washington and move back home.

Dutch meets Kay at the airport before she leaves. Each of them has finally moved on from the pain of their mutual spouses’ betrayal and they are happy to see each other. Dutch asks Kay if he can take her out on a date sometime.

== Cast ==
- Harrison Ford as Sergeant William "Dutch" Van Den Broeck
- Kristin Scott Thomas as Kay Chandler
- Charles S. Dutton as Alcee
- Bonnie Hunt as Wendy Judd
- Dennis Haysbert as Detective George Beaufort
- Sydney Pollack as Carl Broman
- Richard Jenkins as Truman Trainor
- Paul Guilfoyle as Dick Montoya
- Susanna Thompson as Peyton Van Den Broeck
- Peter Coyote as Cullen Chandler
- Kate Mara as Jessica Chandler
- Susan Floyd as Molly Roll
- Dylan Baker as Richard Judd
- Lynne Thigpen as Phyllis Bonaparte
- Reiko Aylesworth as Mary Claire Clark
- Bill Cobbs as Marvin
- Edie Falco as Janice

== Production ==
The film was stuck in development hell for 15 years before finally being made. In the 1980s, actor Dustin Hoffman met with the book's author with a view to making the film. Although Hoffman prompted CBS Theatrical Films to acquire the rights with a view to his starring in the film, he rejected several drafts of the script before leaving the project altogether. In the early 1990s, Kevin Costner was attached to star in the project, which was then to be directed by James L. Brooks, though this, too, never came to pass. The crash of the Boeing 737 was inspired by the crash of Air Florida Flight 90, a Boeing 737-200 that took off from Ronald Reagan Washington National Airport with destination to Tampa Bay, Florida.

== Reception ==
=== Critical response ===
Random Hearts was poorly received by critics. Review aggregation website Rotten Tomatoes retrospectively gives the film a rating of 18% based on reviews collected from 91 critics. The site's consensus states: "Even Harrison Ford could not save the dull plot and the slow pacing of the movie." Metacritic calculated an average score of 38 out of 100, based on 35 reviews. Audiences polled by CinemaScore gave the film an average grade of "C−" on an A+ to F scale.

In a positive review from The New York Times, Janet Maslin wrote that the films of Sydney Pollack "have managed to be linear while also drifting thoughtfully through the nuances of their characters' behavior, with a stylistic polish and keenness of observation not often found in American films any more." Maslin also noted that "laconic Ford is wrenchingly effective throughout."

In the Chicago Sun-Times, Roger Ebert wrote, "There are so many good things in Random Hearts, but they're side by side instead of one after the other. They exist in the same film, but they don't add up to the result of the film. Actually, the film has no result—just an ending, leaving us with all of those fine pieces, still waiting to come together. If this were a screenplay and not the final product, you could see how with one more rewrite, it might all fall into place."

=== Box office ===
With an estimated budget of $64,000,000, Random Hearts was not a commercial success domestically, earning $31,502,583 in the United States and Canada. The film went on to earn another $43,105,987 in international markets, ending up with a total worldwide gross of $74,608,570.
