= Victor Stoloff =

American filmmaker (1913–2009)

Victor Stoloff

Victor Stoloff (Russian: Виктор Альбертович Столов; 17 March 1913 – 6 December 2009) was a Russian-born American Hollywood director, producer and screenplay writer who worked in film and television. In 1943, Stoloff and Edgar Loew were nominated for an Academy Award in the category "Best Documentary", for the film Little Isles of Freedom, about the Vichy-controlled islands of St. Pierre and Miquelon off the coast of Newfoundland.

== Early life ==
He was born in Tashkent, Russia and moved to Egypt with his family in his youth. He went to university in Egypt, studying law for two years.

== Career ==
He began his professional career as founder, cameraman, and editor of the first Arabic language newsreel company, Orient Actualities. His first film, Desert Boy, was a 1937 short about rural life in Egypt, filmed at Siwa Oasis. It is now part of the film collection at Museum of Modern Art in New York City. He came to the United States in the early 1940s. He met Nelson A. Rockefeller, then coordinator of Inter-American Affairs for Latin America, who agreed to finance a 1942 documentary-style drama entitled "Better Dresses, Fifth Floor," his first American movie. It was not shown in the U.S. It was panned as "utterly unsuited and without objective for South America."

== Personal ==
In addition to English, he spoke Arabic, French, Italian, German, Spanish, and Russian fluently.

== Selected film works ==
- Little Isles of Freedom (1943) - producer, director
- Fatal Symphony (1947) - director
- Egypt By Three (1953) - director
- She Gods of Shark Reef (1958) - screenplay writer
- Desert Desperadoes (1959) - screenplay writer
- Intimacy (1966) - writer, director
- Why? (1971) - director
- The Washington Affair (1977)

== Selected television works ==
- Ford Theater (director)
- Hawaii Five-O (22 episodes, producer)
- High Adventure with Lowell Thomas (two episodes, writer and director)
