= Ruth Roman =

American actress (1922–1999)

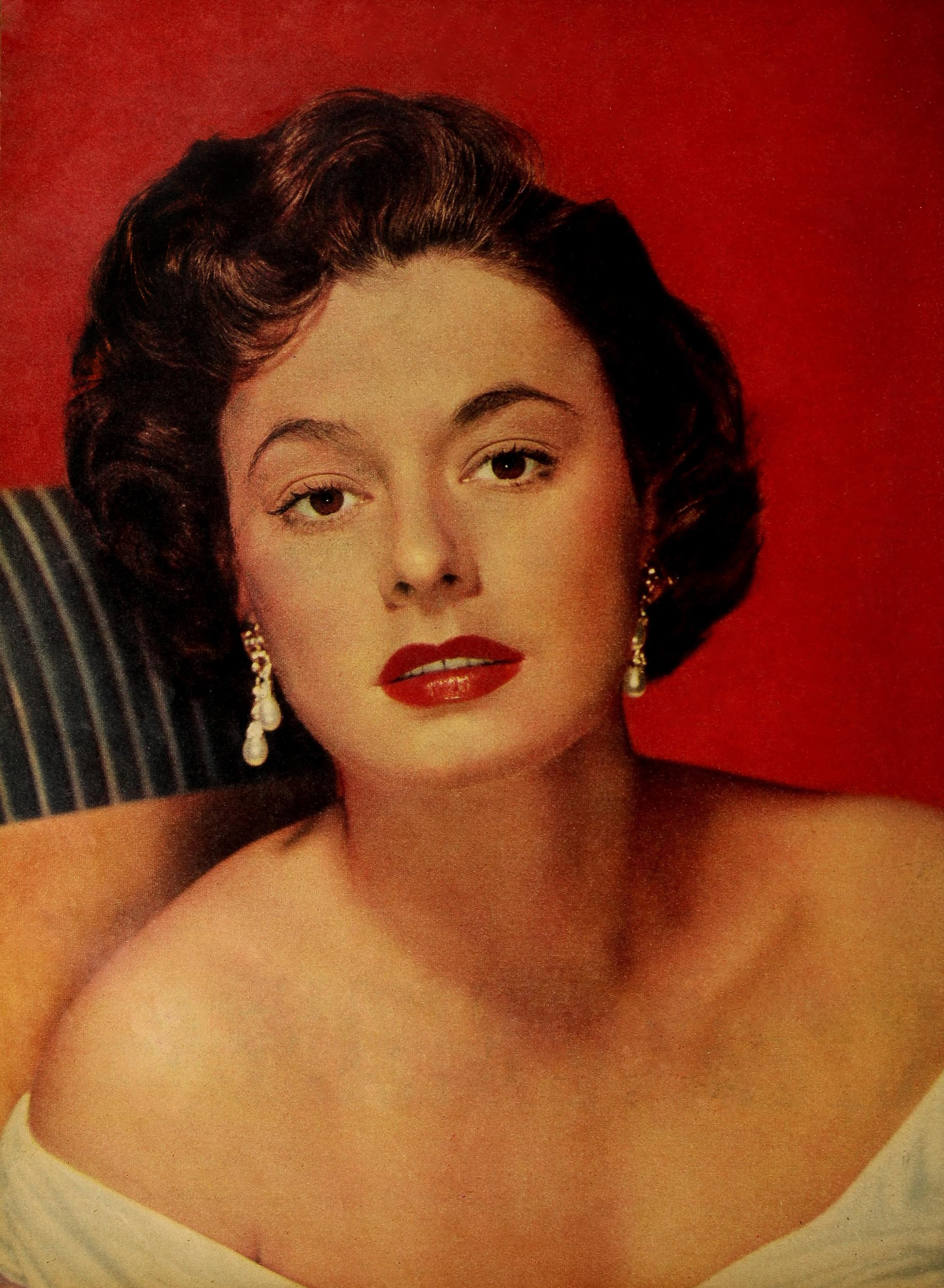
- Roman in 1951
- Born: Norma Roman; December 22, 1922; Lynn, Massachusetts, U.S.
- Died: September 9, 1999 (aged 76); Laguna Beach, California, U.S.
- Occupation: Actress
- Years active: 1943–1989
- Spouse(s): Jack Flaxman (m. 1939; div. 1941) Mortimer Hall (m. 1950; div. 1956) Bud Burton Moss (m. 1956; div. 1960) William Ross Wilson (m. 1976)
- Children: 1
- Relatives: Dorothy Schiff (former mother-in-law)
- Awards: 1959 Sarah Siddons Award

Ruth Roman (born Norma Roman; December 22, 1922 – September 9, 1999) was an American actress of film, stage, and television.

After playing stage roles on the East Coast, Roman moved to Hollywood to pursue a career in films. She appeared in several uncredited bit parts before she was cast as the leading lady in the Western Harmony Trail (1944) and in the title role in the serial film Jungle Queen (1945), her first credited film performances.

Roman first starred in the title role of Belle Starr's Daughter (1948). She achieved her first notable success with a role in The Window (1949) and a year later was nominated for the Golden Globe Award for New Star of the Year – Actress for her performance in Champion (1949). In the early 1950s, she was under contract to Warner Bros., where she starred in a variety of films, including the Alfred Hitchcock thriller Strangers on a Train (1951).

In the mid-1950s, after leaving Warner Bros., Roman continued to star in films and also began playing guest roles for television series. She also worked abroad and made films in England, Italy, and Spain. She was also a passenger aboard the SS Andrea Doria when it collided with another ship and sank in 1956. In 1959, she won the Sarah Siddons Award for her work in the play Two for the Seesaw. Her numerous television appearances earned her a star on the Hollywood Walk of Fame.

== Early life and stage experience ==
Norma Roman was born in Lynn, Massachusetts, to Lithuanian Jewish parents, Mary Pauline (née Gold) and Abraham "Anthony" Roman. She was renamed "Ruth" when a fortune teller told her mother that "Norma" was an unlucky name. Her mother was a dancer, and her father a barker in a carnival sideshow that they owned at Revere Beach, Massachusetts. She had two older sisters, Ann and Eve. Her father died when Ruth was eight, and her mother sold the sideshow. Later, she attended the William Blackstone School and Girls' High School in Boston. She then pursued her desire to become an actress by enrolling in the Bishop Lee Dramatic School in Boston. After further enhancing her skills performing with the New England Repertory Company and the Elizabeth Peabody Players, Roman moved to New York City, where she hoped to find success on Broadway. Instead, she worked as a cigarette girl, a hat check girl, and a model to make a living and save money.

== Career ==
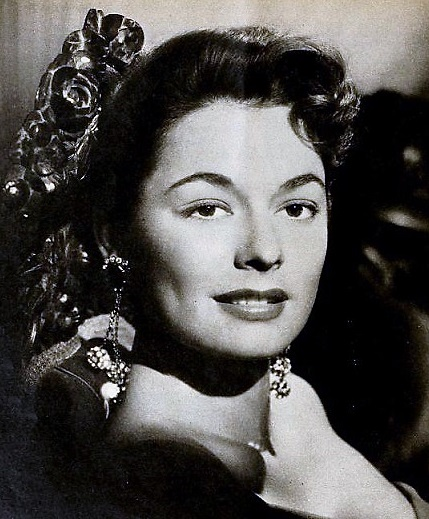
Roman, 1951

Roman moved to Hollywood, where she obtained bit parts in several films such as Stage Door Canteen (1943), Ladies Courageous (1944), Since You Went Away (1944), Song of Nevada (1944), and Storm Over Lisbon (1944). She had a featured role in Harmony Trail (1944), but continued to be mostly unbilled in films such as She Gets Her Man (1945).

Roman was cast in the title role in the 13-episode serial Jungle Queen (1945). Her roles, though, remained small in such films as See My Lawyer (1945), The Affairs of Susan (1945), You Came Along (1945), Incendiary Blonde (1945), Gilda (1946), Without Reservations (1946), A Night in Casablanca (1946), and The Big Clock (1948). While waiting for an opportunity in movies, Roman wrote short stories based on her experiences living in a theatrical boarding house. She sold two of them: The House of the Seven Garbos and The Whip Song.

Roman's career began to improve in the late 1940s when she was cast in a featured role in the 1948 release Good Sam. The next year, she was chosen for the title role in Belle Starr's Daughter, as a killer in the thriller The Window, and as the wife of the central character in Champion, starring Kirk Douglas.

=== Warner Bros. ===
In recognition of Roman's rising status as an actress, Warner Bros. signed her to a long-term contract in 1949, casting her first as a supporting player for Bette Davis in Beyond the Forest and then for Milton Berle and Virginia Mayo in Always Leave Them Laughing. The studio in 1950 cast her as the female lead in Barricade with Dane Clark and Colt .45 with Randolph Scott.

Warners gave her a starring role in Three Secrets (1950) with Eleanor Parker and Patricia Neal. She played a distraught mother waiting to learn whether or not her child survived an airplane crash. This was followed by Dallas (1950), where she was Gary Cooper's leading lady. The May 1, 1950, issue of Life magazine featured Roman in a cover story "The Rapid Rise of Ruth Roman".

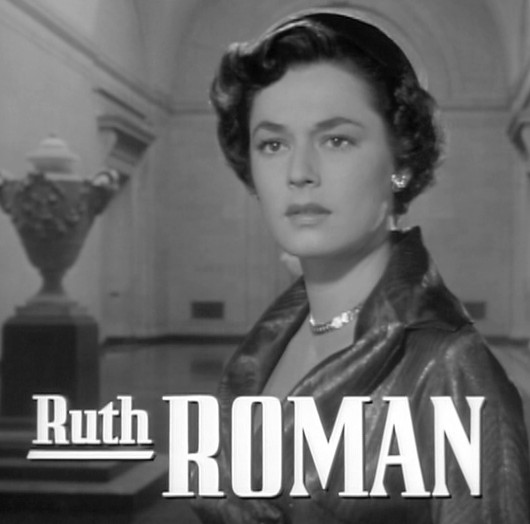
Trailer for Strangers on a Train (1951)

Roman got top billing in Lightning Strikes Twice (1951), directed by King Vidor with Richard Todd. She was Farley Granger's love interest in Strangers on a Train (1951), directed by Alfred Hitchcock. Roman was top-billed as well in the 1951 thriller Tomorrow Is Another Day, co-starring Steve Cochran. That year, she was also one of many Warners stars in Starlift, the studio's musical tribute to United States military personnel fighting in the Korean War.

She was loaned to MGM for Invitation (1952), then co-starred with Errol Flynn in Mara Maru (1952). She went back to MGM to play Glenn Ford's love interest in Young Man with Ideas (1952) and was reunited with Cooper in Blowing Wild (1953), only this time she was billed beneath Barbara Stanwyck.

=== Post-Warners ===
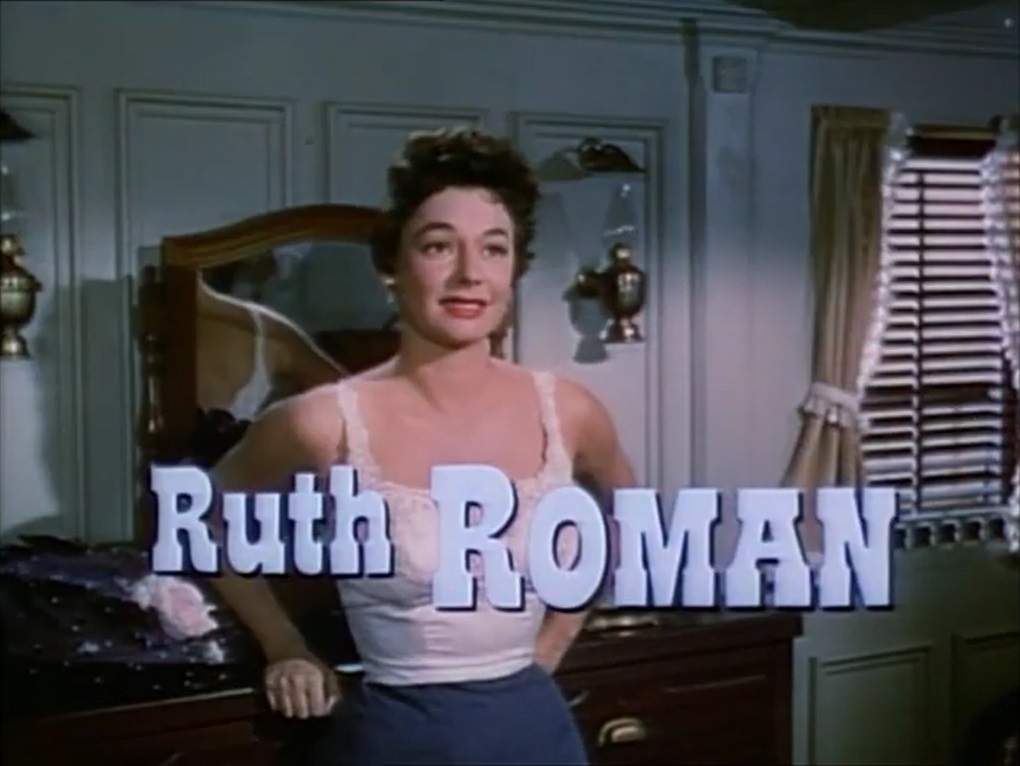
Trailer for The Far Country (1955)

Roman went to Universal to play Van Heflin's love interest in Tanganyika (1954). At Universal she was a love interest to James Stewart in the Anthony Mann-directed Western The Far Country (1955) and at Republic was top billed in The Shanghai Story (1954) with Edmond O'Brien.

Roman made Down Three Dark Streets (1954) with Broderick Crawford, and started appearing on TV in shows like Lux Video Theatre, The Red Skelton Hour, Producers' Showcase, Climax!, General Electric Theater, Celebrity Playhouse, The Ford Television Theatre and Jane Wyman Presents The Fireside Theatre.

Roman had a good part in England in Joe MacBeth (1955) playing Lady MacBeth, and she was with Van Johnson in The Bottom of the Bottle (1956) and Mayo in Great Day in the Morning (1956).

Roman appeared in the Western Rebel in Town (1956) and was top-billed in 5 Steps to Danger (1957). She was in Bitter Victory (1957) and went to Italy to star in Desert Desperados (1959).

=== Continuing work in theatre ===
In 1959, Roman won the Sarah Siddons Award for her work in Chicago theatre. She was selected from among 47 nominees based on her performance in Two for the Seesaw.

Back in Hollywood, she played Paul Anka's mother in Look in Any Window (1961).

=== Television ===
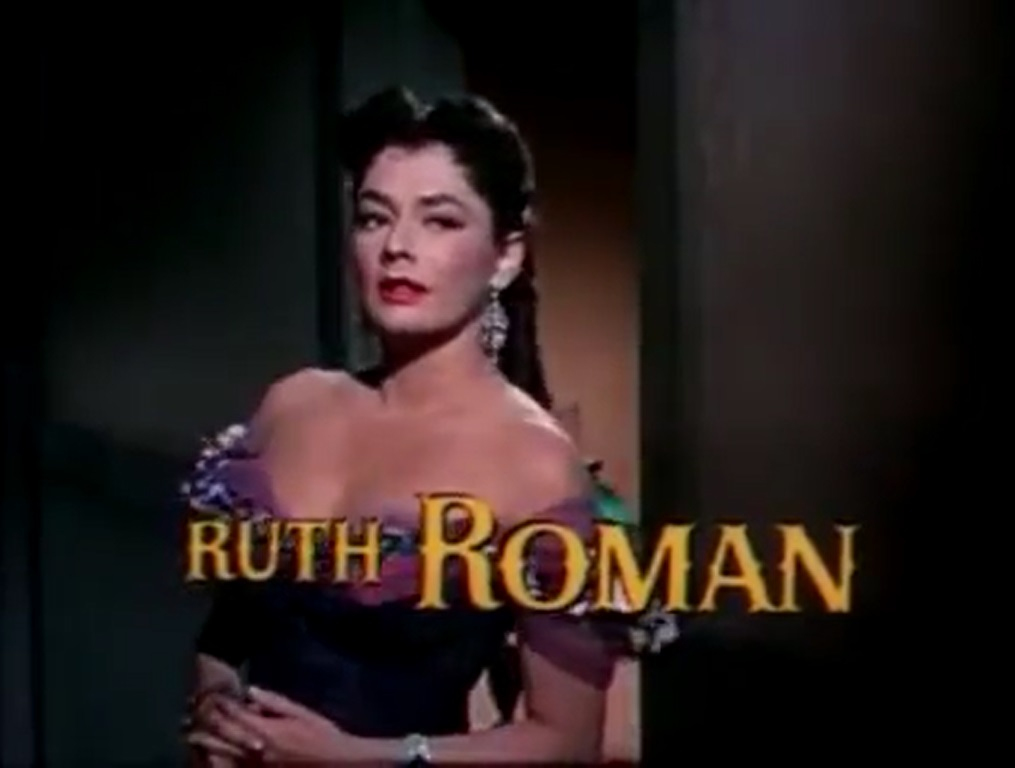
Trailer for Great Day in the Morning (1956)

Roman worked regularly in films well up to the late 1950s. Then she began making appearances on television shows. These included recurring roles in NBC's 1965–1966 The Long, Hot Summer, and toward the end of her career, recurring roles in the 1986 season of Knots Landing and several episodes of Murder, She Wrote, both on CBS.

She guest-starred in NBC's Bonanza and Sam Benedict, ABC's The Bing Crosby Show sitcom and its circus drama The Greatest Show on Earth starring Jack Palance, as well as Burke's Law starring Gene Barry and I Spy featuring Robert Culp and Bill Cosby. She also appeared as a fiery redhead in an episode of Gunsmoke.

She appeared in the early 1960s in the medical dramas The Eleventh Hour and Breaking Point. She starred in a season 3 episode of Mission: Impossible (1968) titled "The Elixir" as Riva Santel as well as a Season 2 episode of Naked City. Many other series featured guest appearances by Roman, including Route 66, Ironside, The Untouchables, Mannix, Cannon, Marcus Welby, M.D., The Mod Squad, The F.B.I., Tarzan, and The Outer Limits episode Moonstone (1964).

In 1971 Roman appeared as Marjorie Worth on "The Men from Shiloh" (rebranded name for the TV Western The Virginian) in the episode titled "The Angus Killer."

In 1960, Roman was honored with a star on the Hollywood Walk of Fame at 6672 Hollywood Boulevard for her contribution to television.

== Personal life ==
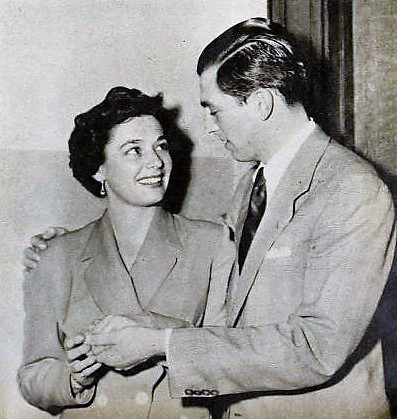
Roman and her second husband, Mortimer Hall

Roman was married four times. She had one son with husband Mortimer Hall, son of publisher Dorothy Schiff.

She married Hall on December 17, 1950. In 1956, she sued him for divorce, and the divorce decree became final on April 15, 1957.

=== SS Andrea Doria sinking ===
In July 1956, Roman was just finishing a trip to Europe with her three-year-old son. At the port of Cannes they boarded the Italian passenger liner SS Andrea Doria as first-class passengers for their return passage to the United States. On the night of July 25, the vessel collided with the Swedish passenger liner MS Stockholm.

Roman was in the Belvedere Lounge when the collision happened and immediately took off her high heels and scrambled back to her cabin barefoot to retrieve her sleeping son. Several hours later, they were both evacuated with the other passengers from the sinking liner. Her son was lowered first into a waiting lifeboat, but before she could follow, the lifeboat departed. Ruth stepped into the next boat and was eventually rescued along with 750 other survivors from the Andrea Doria by the French passenger liner SS Île de France. Her son was rescued by the Stockholm and was reunited with his mother in New York.

== Death ==
Roman died at the age of 76 in her sleep of natural causes at her beachfront villa on Crescent Bay in Laguna Beach, California, on September 9, 1999.

== Partial filmography ==
- Stage Door Canteen (1943) - Girl (uncredited)
- Ladies Courageous (1944) - WAF (uncredited)
- Since You Went Away (1944) - Envious Girl in Train Station (uncredited)
- Song of Nevada (1944) - Dancer (uncredited)
- Storm Over Lisbon (1944) - Checkroom Girl (uncredited)
- Harmony Trail (1944) - Ann Martin
- She Gets Her Man (1945) - Glamour Girl (uncredited)
- Jungle Queen (1945, serial) - Lothel - Jungle Queen
- See My Lawyer (1945) - Mud Girl (uncredited)
- The Affairs of Susan (1945) - Girl at Bright Dollar (uncredited)
- You Came Along (1945) - Gloria Revere (uncredited)
- Incendiary Blonde (1945) - Chorine (uncredited)
- Gilda (1946) - Girl (uncredited)
- Without Reservations (1946) - Girl in Negligee (uncredited)
- A Night in Casablanca (1946) - Harem Girl (uncredited)
- The Big Clock (1948) - Secretary at Meeting (uncredited)
- Good Sam (1948) - Ruthie
- Belle Starr's Daughter (1948) - Cimarron Rose
- Champion (1949) - Emma
- The Window (1949) - Mrs. Jean Kellerson
- Beyond the Forest (1949) - Carol Lawson
- Always Leave Them Laughing (1949) - Fay Washburn
- Barricade (1950) - Judith Burns
- Colt .45 (1950) - Beth Donovan
- Three Secrets (1950) - Ann Lawrence
- Dallas (1950) - Tonia Robles
- Lightning Strikes Twice (1951) - Shelley Carnes
- Strangers on a Train (1951) - Anne Morton
- Tomorrow Is Another Day (1951) - Catherine 'Cay' Higgins
- Starlift (1951) - Ruth Roman
- Invitation (1952) - Maud Redwick
- Mara Maru (1952) - Stella Callahan
- Young Man With Ideas (1952) - Julie Webster
- Blowing Wild (1953) - Sal Donnelly
- Tanganyika (1954) - Peggy Marion
- The Far Country (1954) - Ronda Castle
- The Shanghai Story (1954) - Rita King
- Down Three Dark Streets (1954) - Kate Martell
- Joe MacBeth (1955) - Lily MacBeth
- The Bottom of the Bottle (1956) - Nora Martin
- Great Day in the Morning (1956) - Boston Grant
- Rebel in Town (1956) - Nora Willoughby
- 5 Steps to Danger (1957) - Ann Nicholson
- Amère victoire (UK title: Bitter Victory) (1957) - Jane Brand
- Desert Desperadoes (1959) - The Woman
- Look in Any Window (1961) - Jackie Fowler
- Milagro a los cobardes (1962) - Rubén's mother
- The Alfred Hitchcock Hour (1963) (Season 1 Episode 16: "What Really Happened") - Adelaide 'Addie' Strain
- Love Has Many Faces (1965) - Margot Eliot
- The Baby (1973) - Mrs. Wadsworth
- The Killing Kind (1973) - Rhea Benson
- Impulse (1974) - Julia Marstow
- Knife for the Ladies (1974) - Elizabeth
- Day of the Animals (1977) - Shirley Goodwyn
- The Sacketts (1979) - Rosie
- Echoes (1982) - Michael's Mother

== Radio appearances ==
Year	Program	Episode/source
1952	Hollywood Sound Stage	One Way Passage

== Awards and nomination ==
- 1950 Golden Globe Award for New Star of the Year - Actress for Champion (nominee)
- 1959 Sarah Siddons Award for Two for the Seesaw (winner)
- 1960 Star for Television on the Hollywood Walk of Fame
