= Henry S. Kesler =

- Born: April 24, 1907; Salt Lake City, Utah, U.S.
- Died: May 15, 1997 (aged 90); Salt Lake City, Utah, U.S.
- Occupation: Director
- Spouse(s): Helen Dart (div.); Josefina de los Monteros (div.); Nancy Lee Hurt
- Children: 3

Henry S. Kesler (April 24, 1907 – May 15, 1997) was an American assistant director, second unit director, and director on over 240 films and television programs. A grandson of Joseph F. Smith, Kesler was an active member of the Church of Jesus Christ of Latter-day Saints (LDS Church).

== Early life ==
Henry "Hank" Smith Kesler was born on April 24, 1907, in the Beehive House in Salt Lake City to Alonzo Pratt Kesler and Donnette Smith Kesler. He was the fourth of their six children. He was the grandson of Joseph F. Smith, who was a president of the LDS Church. When he was 11 years old, his father died. Kesler was baptized into the LDS Church in 1915 by Joseph F. Smith. He attended Teacher Training Junior High School through the LDS High School. He went on to attend the University of Utah and majored in business. Kesler was called to serve as a missionary for the church during his study at the University of Utah. He served in Germany and Austria during the years 1927 to 1929. After returning, he resumed studying.

== Career ==
Kesler left Utah in 1932 during the Great Depression to go to Southern California. However, the company he went with declared bankruptcy. Instead, he found a job with Robert Nash the business manager, for actress Anne Harding. When Nash left, Kesler was left to continue his business, beginning his career in the film industry. He held this position for three years.

Kesler entered the film industry by working with Robert Nash. Among his first clients in California was Hopalong Cassidy. Kesler decided to become a production manager instead of a business manager. He was a production manager on The History ofBaseball. He was unemployed for a time after that production was finished. He got a job with Paramount Pictures as a second assistant director from 1938 to 1943. He worked with William Wyler, Billy Wilder, and Cecil B. DeMille. He occasionally worked as a second unit director.

After working with Paramount, Kesler went to work with the United Artists from 1944 to 1948. Then he worked for Columbia Pictures from 1949 to 1953 as an associate producer and second unit director. He got his first directing position with Three Russian Girls which was released in 1943.

Kesler returned to work with the United Artists in 1953, but began working at ZIV Television later that year. He would work with that company until 1959, taking a 10-week break in 1957 to work with the United Artists once more. He worked in various positions and with a number of directors including Andrew Stone, Hunt Stromberg, and James Nasser. He later helped writer Steven Fisher with the story line of Tokyo Joe. This script was sold to Humphrey Bogart in 1949 when he organized Santana Pictures. Kesler became Bogart's associate producer and worked with him on subsequent films.

With his transition to ZIV, Kesler entered the world of television. He became a television producer and director for shows like I Led Three Lives and Highway Patrol (TV series). Kesler directed over 40 episodes of the television show I led Three Lives. He worked for ZIV Studios until it was sold to United Artists. Then Kesler went to MCA Television Enterprises where he continued to direct and produce television shows. In 1960, he worked at Universal Studios, and the following year worked on Police Doctor for NBC.

Kesler left the film industry in the early 1960s and became the vice president of 1100 Glendon Inc, a construction company. In 1966, he retired in Los Angeles, having produced over 240 movies and television shows during his career. He died on May 15, 1997, in Salt Lake City.

== Personal life ==
Kesler married Helen Dart in 1931, but the couple later divorced. Kesler met Josefina de los Monteros in 1942 in Beverly Hills. They were married, but divorced in 1943. He married Nancy Lee Hurt on March 11, 1945. The couple had two children. Their first son Henry died shortly after he was born, however, and only one son lived to adulthood. He was sealed to his wife on June 28, 1973.

Throughout his life, Kesler was a member of the LDS Church. He admitted that he lost track of his religion during his years in the film industry. He realized its importance in his life when he had his own children. He became more active in his later life and produced the Festival of Christmas at the Los Angeles Temple for 5 years.

== Selected filmography ==
- 5 Steps to Danger (1957) Director
- Song of the Land (1953) Director
- Bedside Manner (1945) Second Unit Director
