= The War of the Roses (novel) =

1981 novel by Warren Adler

The War of The Roses
- 1st edition cover
- Author: Warren Adler
- Language: English
- Genre: Novel
- Publisher: Warner Books Inc
- Publication date: April 1981
- Publication place: United States
- Media type: Print (hardback & paperback)
- Pages: 263 pp
- ISBN: 0-446-51220-6
- OCLC: 6789918
- Dewey Decimal: 813/.54 19
- LC Class: PS3551.D64 W37
- Followed by: The Children of the Roses

The War of the Roses is a 1981 novel by Warren Adler about a self-destructive couple. It has been adapted into two films, The War of the Roses (1989) and The Roses (2025).

== Plot ==
The War of the Roses tells the story of Jonathan and Barbara Rose, and their descent from a picturesque family life into a world of macabre self-destruction. The novel begins with the main characters, Jonathan and Barbara, as they are introduced to each other. Some years later, they seem happily married in a Washington, D.C., suburb. They have a dream house, filled with a lifetime's worth of antiques that they have collected, two children (Eve and Josh), a dog, and a cat. Both of them are successful with their work, and they have recently hired an au pair to aid in the upkeep of the house and the children. Jonathan is a successful lawyer, and Barbara has embarked on a gourmet business endeavor with a promising start.

However, when Jonathan has what is believed to be a heart attack, Barbara realizes she no longer loves him and would not be distraught if he died. Upon returning home, she tells her husband that their marriage is over and it has been for some time and he never realized it.

Barbara hires the best divorce attorney in town. Jonathan would like the divorce to go smoothly. He offers Barbara a monthly allowance, as well as half of everything they have. Barbara rejects the offer, demanding the house and all of its contents, reasoning that, as the homemaker, she was the one putting the house together, raising their children, and making it a home they both wanted. Jonathan refuses this rationale, puts an attorney of his own on a retainer, and opts not to move out, citing an old legal precedent which permits a couple to live under the same roof while going through a divorce.

Despite the warnings of their attorneys, both take it upon themselves to make the other miserable with sabotage, vandalism and violence.

== Adaptations ==
In 1989, The War of the Roses was adapted into a film, which proved a critical and commercial success. It stars Michael Douglas and Kathleen Turner and was directed by Danny DeVito, who also co-stars. Another film adaptation titled The Roses, written by Tony McNamara, directed by Jay Roach, and starring Olivia Colman and Benedict Cumberbatch, was released on August 29, 2025.
