= War of the Roses (radio show) =

Syndicated radio skit

The War of the Roses is a radio skit.

== Format ==
The general format of the skit is that the host of a radio show calls a male with an offer of free roses, then asks the male where he would like to have them delivered. However, the female is in fact silently listening to the call the entire time, having previously been contacted by the host.

During the skit, the host asks the suspect questions that will hopefully reveal the identity of the subject of their affair, and other questions that may help understand the nature of it. For example, the host will typically ask the suspect for one or two sentences to be used as an optional "personal message" to be included with the gift, before asking for the name of the desired recipient. Once the man gives up the name and reveals the secret relationship, the woman is free to jump in and chastise the guilty party over the phone.

The ruse may be improvised depending on what is believed to most likely attract the suspect's attention. Examples used include free concert tickets for a man who "couldn't stop talking about how Beyoncé is coming to town next week but who still hasn't asked [his wife] to go" with him, or a purported call from a venereal disease clinic. The VD ruse involved stating that "someone with a disease listed you as a recent sexual partner, but we can only tell you more (for confidentiality reasons) if you can tell us the name of the person who might have referred you".

Often, the target is confused and bewildered when confronted on the phone, because they are unaware that they've been taken in by a ruse, and often can't believe their significant other is really listening on an extension. Suspects who believe this continue with the prize dialogue with the radio station host and continue to embarrass themselves, unaware that the entire call is a prank.

Other suspects turn out to not be cheating at all, and end up sending the roses - and the embarrassment along with them - to their significant other who initiated the call.

== History ==
War of the Roses was created in early 1994 by Los Angeles radio personality Rick Dees shortly after receiving word that crosstown KGGI Riverside/San Bernardino morning show host Sean "Hollywood" Hamilton was having tremendous rating success with a similar feature called "Bait Your Mate". Since 2012, Hamilton, who now hosts War of the Roses, has continued to dominate in the ratings in New York City.

One of the earliest known segments was done in 1996 on Andy Savage's radio program "The Edge" based in Minneapolis, Minnesota. While Savage has claimed the bit was real, Snopes.com lists this as still up for debate. At an internal company ceremony recognizing Dave Ryan's 25th Anniversary at KDWB, program director Rich Davis told the crowd that Ryan has to "think of new ideas for War of the Roses every week." While Ryan immediately responded "But it's real," Davis's impromptu quip lends evidence to the conclusion that this program element may not be completely authentic.

== Animated Series ==
On July 8, 2025, iHeartMedia announced that War of the Roses would be adapted into an animated series, scheduled to premiere on July 24, 2025. The series is a collaboration between iHeartMedia, Woody Productions, and Aboot Studios, a Canadian animation company in North Bay, Ontario. Aboot leads the animation production and partners with Canadore College to involve recent graduates and interns in the process. Longtime host Sean “Hollywood” Hamilton serves as executive producer alongside co-host Marie, with the animated series drawing directly from real segments of the original radio show.

The show also incorporates immersive 360-degree audio powered by Google's Eclipsa Audio platform, with additional audio mixing provided by Vaudeville Sound. Its soundtrack includes a mix of established and indie musicians such as Peter DiStefano (Porno for Pyros), Dave Krusen (Pearl Jam), Artikal Sound System, Sophie Powers, Cas Haley, The Tiger Lillies, and Kemo the Blaxican of Delinquent Habits. The adaptation preserves the show's original premise, exposing infidelity through deceptive phone calls while presenting it in a visually stylized and narratively heightened animated format.

== Station list ==
- Mad Dog & Maura show on Virgin Radio CKFM in Toronto, ON, Canada
- The Wake Up Call on 107.9 KDND 107.9 in Sacramento, CA
- The Dave Ryan in The Morning Show on KDWB in Minneapolis, MN
- On Air with Ryan Seacrest 102.7 KIIS FM (Los Angeles, CA)
- Roula & Ryan on 104.1 KRBE in Houston, TX
- JohnJay And Rich Show KISS FM in Phoenix, AZ
- The Joe Show on 93.3 FLZ Tampa
- The Mojo in the Morning Show on WKQI in Detroit, MI
- Courtney and Kiss in the Morning Kiss 95.7 Hartford, CT
- Hollywood Hamilton afternoon show on WKTU 103.5FM in New York, NY.
- La jungla de la mañana en la nueva mega 94.9 WZTU en Miami, FL
- Jagger and Kristi Magic 92.5 San Diego, CA
- The Mix Morning Fix on 105.1 KUDD in Salt Lake City, UT

== Service mark ==
"War of the Roses" is a registered service mark. It is owned by the Capstar Radio Operating Company, a subsidiary of iHeartMedia
