= Shake Hands with the Devil (1959 film) =

1959 film by Michael Anderson

- Directed by: Michael Anderson
- Written by: Ivan Goff; Ben Roberts
- Story by: Marian Spitzer
- Based on: Shake Hands with the Devil; 1933 novel by Rearden Conner
- Produced by: Michael Anderson
- Starring: James Cagney; Don Murray; Dana Wynter; Glynis Johns
- Cinematography: Erwin Hillier
- Edited by: Gordon Pilkington
- Music by: William Alwyn
- Production companies: Pennebaker Productions; Troy Films
- Distributed by: United Artists
- Release dates: 21 May 1959 (Dublin); 24 June 1959 (U.S.)
- Running time: 111 minutes
- Country: United States; Ireland; United Kingdom
- Language: English
- Budget: $2 million or £600,000

Shake Hands with the Devil is a 1959 war drama-thriller film produced and directed by Michael Anderson and starring James Cagney, Don Murray, Dana Wynter, and Glynis Johns, and features supporting roles by Michael Redgrave, Sybil Thorndike, Cyril Cusack, and Richard Harris. The film follows a group of Irish Republican Army (IRA) fighters in Dublin during the War of Independence. The screenplay by Ivan Goff and Ben Roberts is based on the 1933 novel by Rearden Conner, the son of a Royal Irish Constabulary policeman.

An international co-production between the United States, the Republic of Ireland, and the United Kingdom, the film was shot on-location in Dublin and at Ardmore Studios. It premiered in Dublin on May 21, 1959, and was released by United Artists on June 24. It received positive reviews from critics.

== Plot ==
Irish-American Kerry O'Shea is studying at the College of Surgeons in 1921 Dublin, Ireland, during the Irish War of Independence. Apolitical and sick of killing after fighting in World War I, he is drawn into the struggle between the outlaw Irish Republican Army (IRA) and the British Black and Tans.

He and his friend and fellow medical student, Paddy Nolan, are caught in the middle of an IRA ambush, and Nolan is shot by the British. Nolan tells O'Shea to fetch Sean Lenihan, one of their professors. Lenihan, it turns out, is also a high-ranking IRA leader known as "the Commandant". Lenihan removes the bullet, but Nolan dies anyway.

Since O'Shea left his textbook (with his name inscribed) at the scene of the ambush, he is now a wanted man. Lenihan takes him to meet his superior, "the General", an old comrade-in-arms of O'Shea's father. When O'Shea refuses his invitation to join the IRA, the General arranges for a boat passage out of Ireland. Lenihan takes him to a hideout by the sea, the base of an IRA unit commanded by Chris Noonan. Lenihan is furious to find local barmaid Kitty Brady consorting with the men there.

When Liam O'Sullivan, a top IRA leader, is wounded escaping from prison, O'Shea agrees to accompany the unit to the rendezvous point to treat him. O'Sullivan is discovered in the boot of the car of aged Lady Fitzhugh and killed in a shootout by the British. When the soldiers check the people in the nearby pub (where the IRA men are waiting), Terence O'Brien tries to hide a pistol he brought (against Noonan's explicit orders). When it is found, it is O'Shea who is taken away. He is brutally beaten by Colonel Smithson of the Black and Tans, but refuses to talk. Lenihan leads a raid to rescue him. At that point, O'Shea decides to join the IRA.

Lady Fitzhugh is sentenced to prison and goes on a hunger strike. Lenihan kidnaps Jennifer Curtis, the widowed daughter of a top British adviser, to try to force a prisoner exchange. Complications ensue when Kerry falls for her. When Kitty gets into trouble, both with Lenihan and the British, she decides to leave Ireland.

Lenihan prepares to assassinate Colonel Smithson at the dock. However, he suspects he has been betrayed when Kitty, purely by coincidence, tries to board a ship there. During the ensuing shootout, Lenihan shoots Kitty dead in cold blood.

When the men reassemble at a lighthouse, they hear two bits of news. First, Lady Fitzhugh has died. Second, the British have offered a peace treaty. The General is satisfied to have peace, but not Lenihan. When he decides to execute Mrs. Curtis, O'Shea has to stop him. They exchange shots, and Lenihan is killed.

== Cast ==
- James Cagney as Sean "The Commandant" Lenihan
- Don Murray as Kerry O'Shea
- Dana Wynter as Jennifer Curtis
- Glynis Johns as Kitty Brady
- Michael Redgrave as The General
- Sybil Thorndike as Lady Fitzhugh
- Cyril Cusack as Chris Noonan
- Harry Brogan as Tom Cassidy
- Robert Brown as Black and Tans First Sergeant
- Lewis Casson as Judge
- Christopher Casson as Brigadier
- John Cairney as Mike O'Callaghan
- Harry Corbett as Clancy
- Allan Cuthbertson as Captain
- Donal Donnelly as Willie Lafferty
- Eithne Dunne as Eileen O'Leary
- Richard Harris as Terence O'Brien
- William Hartnell as Sergeant Jenkins
- John Le Mesurier as British General
- Niall MacGinnis as Michael O'Leary
- Patrick McAlinney as Donovan, bartender
- Ray McAnally as Paddy Nolan
- Clive Morton as Sir Arnold Fielding
- Noel Purcell as Liam O'Sullivan
- Peter Reynolds as Black and Tans Captain
- Christopher Rhodes as Colonel Smithson
- Walter Gotell as Black and Tans Sergeant
- Eamonn Andrews as the voice of the narrator

== Production ==
James Cagney described the opportunity to work on the film as "a plum part and a trip to Ireland – unbeatable."

The actor was approached for the role of Sean Lenihan by screenwriters Ivan Goff and Ben Roberts, with whom he had previously collaborated on White Heat, Come Fill the Cup, and Man of a Thousand Faces. According to Roberts, the writers believed American audiences might struggle to understand the character, whom they viewed as an uncompromising revolutionary. "The research we have done indicates to us that Ireland is full of these men and will be, forever," Roberts remarked. Cagney assured the writers that he would portray the role "straight down the line" and would not "soften" the character.

The film was produced by Pennebaker Productions, the company founded by Marlon Brando. When questioned by journalists about his connection to Brando, Cagney replied, "Never even seen one of his films. Don't know what Method acting is."

Reflecting on Cagney’s performance, co-star Don Murray later commented that Cagney was "a strikingly good actor but also what one would call a personality actor. He was always Cagney, and truly wonderful, but he was playing his own personality."

=== Filming ===
The film was filmed in Dublin, Ballymore Eustace, Ballyknockan and at Ardmore Studios in Bray, Ireland.

In his autobiography Cagney by Cagney, the actor wrote that the "beauty of Ireland speaks unarguably for itself," and recalled the film was "made memorable for me by shooting it at Bray in the beautiful countryside close to Dublin", allowing him to "know and love that lush greenness."

During production in Ireland, Cagney had planned to research his family history, but poor weather conditions and a demanding shooting schedule prevented this. He did, however, make a public appearance, performing at the Theatre Royal in Dublin on 23 September 1958. His routine, inspired by George M. Cohan – whom Cagney had portrayed in an Oscar-winning performance in Yankee Doodle Dandy – formed part of a benefit event for the Variety Club of Ireland.

== Release ==
The film received its world premiere on 21 May 1959 in Dublin. The film was initially banned from exhibition in Northern Ireland for fear of sparking riots, though the ban was lifted by September 1959.

== Critical reception ==
Picturegoer magazine described the film as "perhaps the most successful amalgamation of exciting action and deep-thinking moral conflict since Carol Reed's The Third Man".

Howard Thompson of The New York Times characterised it as "one of the fastest, toughest and most picturesque dramas about the Irish Revolution."

The Times of London wrote that the film was "a good adventure yarn which, through fastidious production and a driving integrity, often reaches distinction."

In a contemporary review, The Monthly Film Bulletin wrote:

With Shake Hands with the Devil, Michael Anderson gave himself the opportunity fo achieve something really ambitious. He had independence (Troy Films is his own company); he had a theme which could be forcefully developed both at the level of character study and, with its obvious contempory parallels, political comment; he had the Irish setting and a distinguished and capable cast. What he has in fact done is to treat the subject as melodrama, with some intermittently exciting interludes (Lenihan's escape from the operating theatre, Lady FitzHugh's capture), but a continual debasing of his theme's dramatic currency. The Black and Tan savagery becomes a Jackboot caricature; the rebels' lighthouse hideout an excuse for some pretty romantic sea-scapes; the conflict between Kerry's ideals and his involvement in violence is handled in the style of the Western theme of the reluctant gunfighter; and Lenihan's repressions and tensions are indicated mainly insofar as they yield material for a fanciful beach scene in which he spurns Kitty O'Brady, the village prostitute. The style of the film is staccato, flashy and over-emphatic, the camerawork all glistening night streets and heavy shadows, and the playing uneven. James Cagney is spruce, hard-hitting but a little gangsterish, Glynis Johns and Dana Wynter respectively too boisterous and too subdued, and Don Murray effective mainly because he is able to make the most of his natural sincerity. It is Hat though, that Michael Redgrave, as the I.R.A. general, is reduced to platitudes: when it comes to voicing an issue, as it should do in the scenes between Lenihan and the general, the film has all too little to say.

In British Sound Films: The Studio Years 1928–1959 David Quinlan rated the film as "good", writing: "Strong thriller liked by most critics; a few complained that it cheapened and caricatured the conflict."

The Radio Times Guide to Films gave the film 3/5 stars, writing: "A distinguished cast of British and Irish actors, plus American Don Murray, bolster James Cagney in this somewhat grim and melodramatic but well-made mix of politics, romance, and violence."
