= Backfire (1950 film) =

1950 film by Vincent Sherman

- Theatrical release poster
- Directed by: Vincent Sherman
- Screenplay by: Ivan Goff; Larry Marcus; Ben Roberts
- Story by: Larry Marcus
- Produced by: Anthony Veiller
- Starring: Edmond O'Brien; Virginia Mayo; Gordon MacRae; Dane Clark; Viveca Lindfors
- Cinematography: Carl E. Guthrie
- Edited by: Thomas Reilly
- Music by: Daniele Amfitheatrof
- Production company: Warner Bros. Pictures
- Distributed by: Warner Bros. Pictures
- Release date: January 26, 1950 (New York City)
- Running time: 91 minutes
- Country: United States
- Language: English

Backfire is a 1950 American film noir crime film directed by Vincent Sherman starring Virginia Mayo and Gordon MacRae, with Edmond O'Brien, Dane Clark, and Viveca Lindfors in support.

The film was written by Larry Marcus, Ben Roberts and Ivan Goff. Goff and Roberts would go on to write White Heat the following year, a film that also stars O'Brien and Mayo.

Although Backfire was completed in October 1948, it was not released until January 1950.

== Plot ==
American soldier Bob Corey, seriously wounded at the end of World War II is a patient at an army hospital undergoing several surgical operations on his spine. He has fallen in love with his nurse, Julie Benson. Bob's military pal Steve Connolly arrives to discuss plans for the ranch in Scottsdale, Arizona that they plan to purchase and operate together. The two men pool their G.I. benefits, which total $40,000.

On Christmas Eve, as Bob lies semiconscious in bed, a woman with a Swedish accent appears and says that Steve has been in a horrible accident; his spine is shattered and he wants to die, but she has refused to help him commit suicide. The woman asks Bob what to do, and he advises her to do nothing to harm Steve, and just to wait. Bob slips into unconsciousness and the woman disappears.

After Bob is released from the hospital, he is questioned by police captain Garcia, who tells him that Steve is wanted for the murder of Solly Blayne, a gambler and racketeer. Bob denies that Steve would be involved in anything criminal. Bob rents the hotel room where Steve had been staying, where he encounters Sybil, the gossipy old hotel maid, who says that on the day of the murder, Blayne visited Conolly and demanded $40,000 that he was owed. She gives Bob a business card from a funeral home, which Bob visits, discovering that his friend Ben Arno owns the business. Arno relates that he had watched Steve boxing in the ring and that Steve was evasive when asked about boxing at his age.

Bob and Julie talk to Blayne's widow, who recalls the night when her husband was slain. She had phoned a doctor, who arrived too late to save Blayne. Bob returns to the hotel and dials a phone number listed in the hotel records that Steve had called. A woman named Myrna answers the phone and Bob pretends to be Steve. Myrna unintentionally reveals that Steve had a girlfriend named Lysa Radoff. Bob asks for Lysa's address and takes a cab there. Finding no one home, he enters after finding a key. When Lysa's roommate Bonnie Willis comes home, Bob pretends to be waiting for Lysa, and Bonnie tells him how Steve, working for gambler Lou Walsh, had met Lysa, Walsh's girlfriend and a call girl at his gambling establishment. One night, Bonnie, Steve and Lysa visited Walsh's high-stakes gambling den where Steve, unlike the other men, did not manhandle the girls, and he and Lysa fell in love. Blayne, who was also present, offered Steve a job as a highly paid assistant. Bob also learns that Lysa is the same woman who had visited him in the hospital. To avoid further conversation with Bonnie, Bob runs out of the house. Moments later, Bonnie is murdered by an unseen assailant who fires through her window.

The next night, Garcia interrogates Bob and Julie and accuses them of interfering in the investigation and causing Willis' death. Garcia learns that a man named Lee Quong has been shot and is claiming that he has information on Steve. Garcia, Bob and Julie race to the hospital to interrogate Quong, who relates how he worked at a magnificent home that Walsh had purchased as a gift for Lysa. Walsh had stationed Steve in the house as her bodyguard, unwittingly bringing the two lovers together, and their relationship intensified. Quong had eavesdropped on Steve and Lysa as they planned to elope. Walsh, who had returned unexpectedly, overheard Steve professing his love to Lysa and released the parking brake on Lysa's car on the steep driveway, causing it roll over Steve, crushing several of the vertebrae in his back. Quong fled downtown but shot by Walsh, who realized that Quong had witnessed the crime. Quong dies before he can reveal the address of Walsh's home near Bel Air.

Garcia now has evidence that Steve was physically incapable of murder. Garcia tells the press that the murder weapon used to kill Blayne was also used to kill Bonnie. Acting on a hunch, Julie learns from Mrs. Blayne that the doctor whom she had phoned on the night when her husband was murdered was Dr. Herbert Anstead. Julie goes to Anstead's office later that night in uniform, pretending to be retrieving files for the doctor, but she cannot locate Steve's medical file. When Anstead arrives, Julie hides. Anstead retrieves Steve's file from its hiding place and attempts to burn it, but he is interrupted when Julie confronts him with her knowledge that Steve was a victim of attempted murder and not an accident. Anstead forces Julie into a locked room and calls Bob to inform him of Steve's location, and Julie overhears the address. Walsh enters the office and shoots Anstead before fleeing.

Bob rushes to Steve's address but is intercepted in the house by Ben Arno, who reveals that he is Walsh. Ben tells Bob that Steve had lost money to Blayne. To repay the debt, Steve had agreed to throw a fight. Arno told Steve that he led a double life as Walsh and proposed using Steve's $40,000 to cheat Blayne out of thousands of dollars at gambling, to which Steve agreed. Arno told Steve that Lysa realized that the brakes on her car worked fine and that Steve's injuries were no accident. She attempted to leave, but Walsh strangled her. Arno tells Bob that he had staged the accident but did not want to kill Steve and lose Lysa's love, but once Lysa knew the truth, he was forced to kill her. Arno admits that he began killing anyone who could connect Lysa to him or who knew about Steve's accident. Bob, still weak from his back surgery, is knocked to the ground. As Arno is about to shoot him, Steve, his body encased in braces and plaster, launches himself down the stairs and stops Arno. The police, summoned by Julie, arrive. Arno attempts to flee while shooting at police but is killed.

Many months later, Steve leaves the hospital, his injuries repaired. Bob and his new wife Julie arrive and take Steve to their ranch in Arizona.

== Cast ==
- Gordon MacRae as Bob Corey
- Edmond O'Brien as Steve Connelly
- Virginia Mayo as Julie Benson
- Viveca Lindfors as Lysa Radoff
- Dane Clark as Ben Arno
- Ed Begley as Captain Garcia
- Sheila MacRae (as Sheila Stephens) as Bonnie Willis
- Mack Williams as Dr. Herbert Anstead
- Leonard Strong as Lee Quong
- Frances Robinson as Mrs. Blayne
- Richard Rober as Solly Blayne
- John Dehner as Blake, plainclothesman

== Production notes ==
=== Script development ===
Around 1946 or 1947, Warner Bros. Pictures had purchased the rights to a Larry Marcus story titled Into the Night. The studio tried to interest Vincent Sherman to direct the film adaptation, but he felt that the story was "confused and pointless" and refused. By the spring of 1948, Sherman wanted to work on a simple picture and asked studio head Jack L. Warner if he could adapt John Patrick's play The Hasty Heart into a film. Warner refused and assigned Sherman to the Into the Night project.

Sherman met with producer Anthony Veiller, who admitted that the story needed work. Veiller hired aspiring writers Ivan Goff and Ben Roberts, although they considered themselves comedy writers. As Goff and Roberts continued to craft a screenplay. Sherman voiced his reservations to the studio, but Warner promised a favor in exchange for directing the film,

The shooting title of the film was changed from Into the Night to Somewhere in the City.

=== Casting ===
Warner intended for the film to be a B movie for his contract actors. However, he had six actors who were "sitting around doing nothing but picking up their checks", so he assigned them to the film. Into the Night was Edmond O'Brien's first film for the studio. Lindfors refused at first to participate, upset with what she felt was its excessive violence. Placed on suspension by the studio and under contract for four films, she relented to continue to receive her pay ("I sold out," she later said). The studio was unhappy with her performance in Backfire and declined to continue her contract.

Sherman found Mayo to be nice and an extremely competent actress, but without much personal depth.

Principal filming occurred from late July to mid-October 1948. Interior and exterior hospital scenes were shot at Birmingham Veterans' Hospital (also known as Birmingham General Army Hospital) in Van Nuys, California. The hospital's nursing chief Monica Cahill and assistant chief of surgery Dr. Franklin Wilkins served as technical consultants for the film. Additional scenes were filmed in and around Los Angeles, including the Los Angeles City Hall, the Fremont Hotel and the Bunker Hill district, Olvera Street, Hollywood, Glendale and the Los Feliz neighborhood and Stone Canyon in the Bel Air neighborhood. The film mentions several of these locations by name in both the dialogue and the visual narrative.

=== Music ===
The film's soundtrack was composed by Daniele Amfitheatrof. The song that Viveca Lindfors sings in the nightclub is "Parlez-moi d'Amour," written by Jean Lenoir.

Warners was much more pleased with the efforts of Goff and Roberts, and gave them a five-year contract to write screenplays. They produced White Heat the following year. In return for directing Backfire, Jack Warner permitted Vincent Sherman to direct The Hasty Heart, which became a major hit for the studio.

== Reception ==
=== Release ===
Although Backfire was completed in October 1948, it was not released until January 26, 1950, when the film opened at the Globe Theatre in New York. To take advantage of the previously released film White Heat's popularity, posters for Backfire prominently featured Mayo in a femme fatale pose (incongruous for her character in the film) and contained the tag line: "That 'White Heat' girl turns it on again!" The poster also divulged the surprise conclusion to the film by depicting Ben Arno strangling Lysa Lysa.

=== Critical response ===
In a contemporary review for The New York Times, critic Bosley Crowther wrote: "A very terse observation is all that 'Backfire' deserves, in view of the feeble detonation of this Warner mystery drama ... [I]t rambles from one small coincidence to another without style or suspense until finally it puts a listless finger upon fellow who did the deed. ... In this case, the title is descriptive of the effort expended by all. A short and sweet observation covers 'Backfire': It does!"

Film critic Mildred Martin of The Philadelphia Inquirer wrote: "All too aptly titled, 'Backfire' is a long. drawn-out murder mystery which is neither mysterious enough nor entertaining enough to warrant all the talent that has gone into its playing or direction."

Reviewer Eleanor Bell of The Cincinnati Post called the film "a lively little item" and wrote: "The picture has the advantage of suspense common to all well-staged manhunts, and it seemed to me the cast was working away with a will to make it credible. 'Backfire" is no world beater, but it is fairly solid entertainment, if four murders can be classed as entertaining."

== Home media ==
The film was regularly screened on broadcast television in the United States in the 1950s and 1960s, although most airings trimmed Mayo's part substantially. Warner Bros. released the film on DVD on July 13, 2010, in its Film Noir Classic Collection, Vol. 5.

== Bibliography ==
- American Film Institute (1971). The American Film Institute Catalog of Motion Pictures Produced in the United States. Berkeley, Calif.: University of California Press. ISBN 0-520-21521-4.
- Davis, Ronald L. (1993). The Glamour Factory: Inside Hollywood's Big Studio System. Dallas: Southern Methodist University Press. ISBN 0-87074-357-0.
- Davis, Ronald L. (2005). Just Making Movies: Company Directors on the Studio System. Jackson, Miss.: University Press of Mississippi. ISBN 1-57806-690-5.
- Halliwell, Leslie; Walker, John (1996). Halliwell's Film Guide 1996. New York: HarperPerennial. ISBN 0-06-271601-8.
- Hirschhorn, Clive. (1980). The Warner Bros. Story. New York: Crown. ISBN 0-517-53834-2.
- McGilligan, Patrick. (1984). White Heat. Madison, Wisc.: University of Wisconsin Press. ISBN 0-299-09670-X.
- Reid, John Howard (2006). Great Cinema Detectives: Best Movies of Mystery, Suspense and Film Noir. Morrisville, N.C.: Lulu Press. ISBN 1-84728-685-2.
- Sherman, Vincent (1996). Studio Affairs: My Life as a Film Director. Lexington, Ky.: University Press of Kentucky. ISBN 0-8131-1975-8.
- Shearer, Stephen Michael (2006). Patricia Neal: An Unquiet Life. Lexington, Ky.: University Press of Kentucky. ISBN 0-8131-2391-7.
- Shipman, David (1989). The Great Movie Stars: The International Years. London: Macdonald. ISBN 0-356-18147-2.
