= Ralph Wheelwright =

American producer and screenwriter (1898–1971)

- Born: September 11, 1898; Brooklyn, New York, U.S.
- Died: April 15, 1971 (aged 72); Santa Monica, California, U.S.
- Occupations: Producer, screenwriter
- Spouse: Phinie Green Wheelwright
- Children: 2

Ralph Wheelwright (September 11, 1898 – April 15, 1971) was an American producer and screenwriter. He was nominated for an Academy Award in the category Best Original Screenplay for the film Man of a Thousand Faces.

Wheelwright died on April 15, 1971, at the age of 72 at the Saint John's Health Center in Santa Monica, California.

== Selected filmography ==
- Man of a Thousand Faces (1957; co-nominated with Robert Wright Campbell, Ivan Goff and Ben Roberts)
