= The Killer Who Wouldn't Die =

1976 television film

- Genre: Drama
- Written by: Cliff Gould; Ivan Goff; Ben Roberts
- Screenplay by: Cliff Gould
- Directed by: William Hale
- Starring: Mike Connors; Grégoire Aslan; Mariette Hartley; Patrick O'Neal; Clu Gulager; James Shigeta; Robert Colbert; Robert Hooks; Samantha Eggar
- Music by: Georges Garvarentz
- Country of origin: United States
- Original language: English

Production
- Executive producers: Ivan Goff; Ben Roberts
- Producers: William Cairncross; Michael P. Schoenbrun
- Cinematography: Gert Andersen
- Editor: Neil MacDonald
- Running time: 100 minutes
- Production company: Paramount Television

Original release
- Network: ABC
- Release: April 4, 1974

The Killer Who Wouldn't Die is a 1976 American TV film broadcast by ABC on its The ABC Sunday Night Movie. It was a pilot for a proposed TV series.

== Cast ==
- Mike Connors as Karl Ohanian
- Grégoire Aslan as Ara
- Mariette Hartley as Heather McDougall
- Patrick O'Neal as Commissioner Pat Moore
- Clu Gulager as Harry Keller
- James Shigeta as David Lao
- Robert Colbert as Doug McDougall
- Robert Hooks as Commissioner Frank Wharton
- Samantha Eggar as Anne Roland
- Lucille Benson as Flo
- Phillip Ahn as Soong
- Tony Becker as Steve McDougall
- Christopher L. Gardner as Doug
- Todd Mason as Priest
- James Burr-Johnson as Reardon
- Kate Hawley as Nancy Rigg
- Leslie Howard Fong Jr. as Kim
- Eugene Peterson as Secretary
- Larry Watson as Corpsman
- Don Eitner as Coast Guard Officer
- Kwan Hi Lim as Chew

== Reception ==
It was the ninth highest rated TV show of the week in the US.
