= White Witch Doctor =

1953 Technicolor adventure horror film directed by Henry Hathaway

- Original lobby card
- Directed by: Henry Hathaway
- Written by: Ivan Goff; Ben Roberts
- Based on: White Witch Doctor; 1950 novel by Louise A. Stinetorf
- Produced by: Otto Lang
- Starring: Susan Hayward; Robert Mitchum; Walter Slezak
- Cinematography: Leon Shamroy
- Edited by: James B. Clark
- Music by: Bernard Herrmann
- Distributed by: 20th Century Fox
- Release date: July 1, 1953
- Running time: 96 minutes
- Country: United States
- Language: English
- Budget: $2,020,000
- Box office: $2,500,000 (US rentals)

White Witch Doctor is a 1953 American adventure horror film directed by Henry Hathaway and starring Susan Hayward, Robert Mitchum, and Walter Slezak. Made by 20th Century Fox, it was produced by Otto Lang from a screenplay by Ivan Goff and Ben Roberts, based on the 1950 novel by Louise Allender Stinetorf (1900–1992). The music score (notable for its use of the serpent, an obsolete instrument) was by Bernard Herrmann, and the cinematography by Leon Shamroy.

The film was set in the Belgian Congo in 1907.

== Plot ==
The arrival of nurse Ellen Burton to the Belgian Congo is unwelcome to hunter John "Lonni" Douglas, who captures animals for zoos. He warns her against traveling upriver to join a female doctor who is working with native tribesmen.

Short of money, Lonni is intrigued when partner Huysman tells him there is gold to be found in the region where Ellen will be traveling. Lonni volunteers to accompany her, along with gun bearer Jacques.

Ellen is a widow who once discouraged her physician husband from his dream of coming to Africa to give medical aid. She talks a witch doctor out of killing a woman with an abscessed tooth. Upset with her, the witch doctor places a deadly tarantula in Ellen's tent.

The doctor she is there to assist has died of fever. The king is pleased when his son is saved from a lion by Lonni, his wounds treated by Ellen, but then the king takes her hostage when Huysman, heavily armed, arrives to search for gold. Huysman's men knock Lonni unconscious and tie him up, but Jacques sacrifices his own life to save that of Lonni, who returns to Ellen's side for good.

== Cast ==
- Robert Mitchum as Lonni Douglas
- Susan Hayward as Ellen Burton
- Walter Slezak as Huysman
- Timothy Carey as Jarrett
- Mashood Olabisi Ajala as Jacques

== Production ==
The film's original director was Roy Ward Baker. In his memoir The Director's Cut, Baker writes that at the start of production he spent four months shooting location footage in the Belgian Congo under arduous conditions. He returned to Hollywood exhausted, having lost much weight, and increasingly unhappy about the script, to find that Susan Hayward did not want him as director. A diplomatic solution was found by Lew Schreiber, described by Baker as the "hatchet man" for Darryl F. Zanuck, head of 20th Century Fox. Baker was designated "too ill" to continue directing the picture. He was replaced by Henry Hathaway.

Zanuck demanded that the original story of [Emily] Louise Allender Stinetorf (who had been a Quaker missionary in Palestine) be jettisoned for action and a love story.
