= The Second Sin =

1966 film

The Second Sin is a 1966 South African action film written by Ivan Goff and Ben Roberts. The film was directed by David Millin.
