= Jacqueline Beer =

French actress (born 1932)

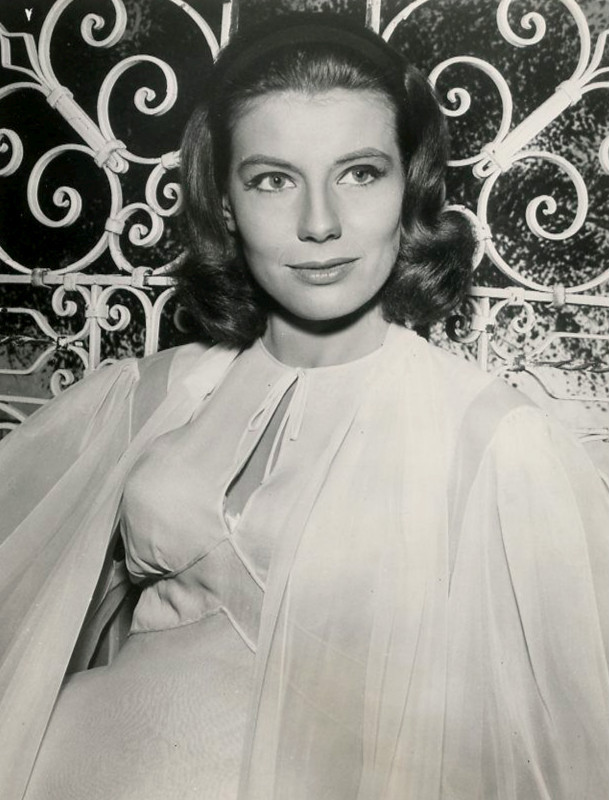
- Beer in 1962
- Born: Jacqueline Vangramberg; 14 October 1932 (age 94); Paris, France
- Other name: Jacqueline Baer
- Occupation: Actress
- Spouses: Jean Antoine Garcia Roady (1955–19??); Thor Heyerdahl (m. 1991; died 2002)
- Children: 3
- Beauty pageant titleholder
- Title: Miss France 1954
- Years active: 1955–1979
- Major competitions: Miss France 1954 (Winner); Miss Universe 1954 (Top 16)

Jacqueline Beer (née Vangramberg; 14 October 1932) is a French actress and beauty pageant titleholder who was crowned Miss France 1954. She represented her country at Miss Universe 1954, where she placed in the Top 16.

Beer later served as Chair of the Board of Directors of the Thor Heyerdahl Institute, located in Larvik, Norway. Her second husband was scientist and explorer Thor Heyerdahl. She was sometimes credited as Jacqueline Baer.

== Early years ==
Beer's father was "a well-known writer and owner of a large horse farm." She received her formal education at a convent near Paris.

== Film and TV ==
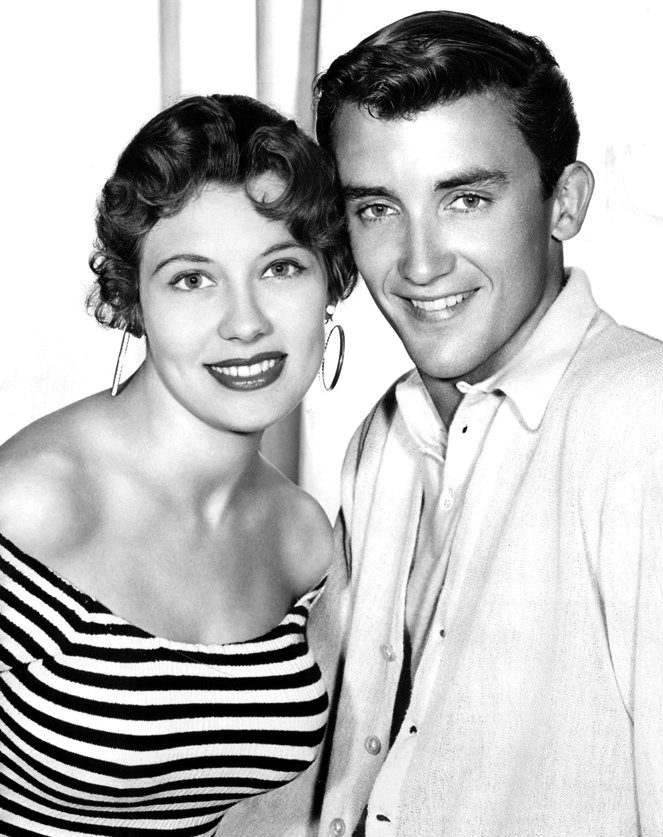
Beer with Ronnie Burns on Burns and Allen, 1956

Soon after winning the Miss France contest, Beer signed a contract with Paramount Pictures.

Her American film debut came in 1956 with an uncredited role as a model in the Bob Hope comedy That Certain Feeling. That same year, she portrayed Marianne in the war drama Screaming Eagles. In 1963, she played Monique Souvir in the mystery thriller The Prize.

Beer also guest-starred in the first season of Maverick in a 1958 episode titled "Diamond in the Rough," starring Jack Kelly. The episode was loosely based on the true story of the Great Diamond Hoax of 1872.

She is best remembered as an actress for her five-year role as Suzanne Fabray on the classic private-eye TV series 77 Sunset Strip.

== Personal life ==
Beer married Jean Antoine Garcia Roady, an accountant, on November 26, 1955. They had two sons, Serge and Laurent, and a daughter, Sabine.

In 1991, Beer married ethnographer and adventurer Thor Heyerdahl, whom she met in Güímar on the Spanish island of Tenerife. She became involved in his work, utilizing her skills as an amateur photographer. After his death in 2002, she remained active in the Thor Heyerdahl Research Centre in Aylesbury, UK, where she serves as Chair of the Board of Directors.

== Television appearances ==
Year	Title	Role	Notes
1955	The People's Choice	Yvette	"Sock Plays Cupid", with Jackie Cooper
1956	The George Burns and Gracie Allen Show	Yvette	Three episodes
1958	Maverick	Henriette	Episode: "Diamond in the Rough" with Jack Kelly
1958–1964	77 Sunset Strip	Suzanne, the switchboard operator	Recurring Role
1959	Sugarfoot	Yvette Marveux	Episode: "The Royal Raiders" with Will Hutchins
1960	The Alaskans	Jacqueline St. Clair	Episode "The Seal Skin-Game" with Roger Moore
1961–1962	Bronco	Celeste Powell and Duchess Eugenia	Two episodes with Ty Hardin
1965	The Rogues	Jean	Episode "Gambit by the Golden Gate" with Charles Boyer, Gig Young and David Niven
1965	Mister Ed	Inez	Episode "Ed the Counterspy"
1965	Run for Your Life	Jeannine Manet	Episode "The Cold, Cold War of Paul Bryan"
1965	The Man from U.N.C.L.E.	Genevieve Fiamma	Episode "The Re-Collectors Affair"
1966	Daniel Boone	Heloise Jolliet	Episode "Gabrie"
1966	Jericho		Episode "Upbeat and Underground"
1979	The French Atlantic Affair	Madam Grilley	
