= Portrait in Black =

1960 American film by Michael Gordon

- Theatrical release cover
- Directed by: Michael Gordon
- Screenplay by: Ivan Goff; Ben Roberts
- Based on: Portrait in Black by Ivan Goff; Ben Roberts
- Produced by: Ross Hunter
- Starring: Lana Turner; Anthony Quinn; Sandra Dee; John Saxon; Lloyd Nolan; Ray Walston; Richard Basehart
- Cinematography: Russell Metty
- Edited by: Milton Carruth
- Music by: Frank Skinner
- Production company: Ross Hunter Productions Inc.
- Distributed by: Universal Pictures
- Release dates: June 23, 1960 (Chicago); June 28, 1960 (Los Angeles); July 27, 1960 (New York City)
- Running time: 112 minutes
- Country: United States
- Language: English
- Budget: $1.4 million
- Box office: $9.2 million

Portrait in Black is a 1960 American neo-noir melodrama film directed by Michael Gordon, and starring Lana Turner and Anthony Quinn. Produced by Ross Hunter, the film was adapted from the play of the same title by Ivan Goff and Ben Roberts, who also wrote the screenplay. The film was distributed by Universal-International. This was the final film appearance by actress Anna May Wong.

== Plot ==
Near the San Francisco Bay, in a meeting with his secretary Miss Lee, ailing shipping magnate Matthew S. Cabot calls for his wife Sheila and his personal physician David Rivera. As Matthew is administered an injection, he asks David about his new hospital job in Zurich. After David leaves, Matthew scolds Sheila for her "love deficiency" and requests she no longer pursues a driver's permit.

Sheila leaves the mansion, and sneaks out of a department store to see David at his apartment. There, David states he is leaving for Zurich tomorrow night so he can avoid fantasizing about murdering Matthew. Sheila bids him farewell, but the next day, David arrives and they fatally inject Matthew. While sailing, Sheila's stepdaughter Cathy and her boyfriend Blake Richards, a young businessman, learn that Matthew has died.

After Matthew's funeral, Sheila experiences nightmares and phones David, who calms her down. Despite his better judgment, David visits her again. The next morning, Matthew's former business partner Howard Mason has Sheila sign paperwork, dissolving a business contract with Blake's business. As she signs, Howard confesses his love towards Sheila, but she rejects him. Inside Howard's office, Blake confronts about the terminated contract. Howard manipulates Miss Lee to lie that Matthew never made a contract. Blake vows to fight back.

Meanwhile, David arrives at Sheila's mansion. Before he leaves, Sheila opens a handwritten note congratulating her for murdering Matthew. They meet later in a park where they learn the letter was postmarked from Carmel the previous Monday. David confides to Sheila they must find who wrote the note and kill them. Elsewhere, at a restaurant, Miss Lee meets with Cathy and Blake to confess that Howard did destroy the contract.

On her way to David's office, Sheila's driver Cobb requests a salary raise, in which she perceives as blackmail. Suddenly, Howard calls Sheila at David's office and infers she and David are lovers. They speculate Howard is blackmailing them and the letter was sent from the Pebble Beach golf course.

Later that night, Howard shares drinks with Sheila and leaves. From inside the mansion, Sheila signals for David to shoot Howard as he drives away, but David misses. Howard returns to Sheila, deduces their murder attempt, and assaults Sheila. Before he can use a fire poker against her, David bursts in and kills him. To cover the murder, David places Howard's body inside his car. David instructs Sheila to drive his car. Along the highway, David uses his car to push Howard's car over the cliffs of Half Moon Bay, which horrifies Sheila.

As the police investigate Howard's murder, they interrogate and detain Blake. Sheila is questioned while her youngest son Peter tells Cathy he had overheard Howard yelling at Sheila the night before. Cathy goes to David's office, where she believes Sheila killed Howard. David tries to convince Cathy otherwise that because Sheila cannot drive, she could not have murdered Howard and dumped the body.

Back at Sheila's mansion, she receives another congratulatory letter of her second murder. Consumed with guilt, David quits his job at the hospital. He heads over to the mansion, where David forces Cobb to confess that Sheila had written the letters. Sheila tearfully explains she used the letters to manipulate David into staying and now they can start a new life together.

Cathy walks in, having listened on their conversation. She tries to call the police, but she rushes upstairs as David chases her. As Blake drives by, Cathy calls for him and she walks onto the roof, followed by David. Sheila calls out for him, but David falls off the roof and dies.

== Cast ==
- Lana Turner as Sheila Cabot
- Anthony Quinn as Dr. David Rivera
- Richard Basehart as Howard Mason
- Sandra Dee as Cathy Cabot
- John Saxon as Blake Richards
- Ray Walston as Cobb
- Virginia Grey as Miss Lee
- Anna May Wong as Tawny
- Lloyd Nolan as Matthew S. Cabot
- John Wengraf as Dr. Kessler
- Paul Birch as Detective Lieutenant
- Elizabeth Chan as Chinese Dancer
- Dennis Kohler as Peter Cabot
- John McNamara as Minister
- George Womack as Foreman

== Production ==
Portrait in Black originated from a play that had premiered in London at the Piccadilly Theatre in 1946. It had a short run on Broadway the following year. The playwrights, Ivan Goff and Ben Roberts, had worked on it for 13 months. During its Broadway run, the trade magazine Variety felt the play was "much too conventional, and it's not easy to believe that its mannerly characters have a flair for homicide."

The film rights were sold almost immediately to Universal Pictures for a reported $100,000 against a sliding percentage of the gross to reach a maximum of 15 percent, which totaled $2.5 million. A clause was added that if a film was not released by June 30, 1950, the rights would revert to the authors and they would keep the $100,000. Diana Wynyard appeared in the London production and her husband Carol Reed was going to direct the film version. However, he disagreed with Universal about how best to adapt it. Another director, Michael Gordon, encountered similar difficulties. In 1948, Goff approached Universal to buy the project back but balked at the studio's demand for $316,000. When the June 30, 1950 deadline passed, the project reverted to the authors. They tried finance the film with Michael Gordon and Joan Crawford.

Michael Gordon felt the original play was "well-contrived, well-made... I thought it was dramatic literature, but not what I would call a monument in dramatic literature. It was interesting but not something that made my heart leap with joy and ecstasy. I didn't enjoy doing the picture at all." Gordon stated Lana Turner gave a "serviceable performance". He also added "Lana was not a dummy, and she would give me wonderful rationalizations why she should wear pendant earrings. They had nothing to do with the role, but they had to do with her particular self-image. I felt we might have done better to concentrate on areas of her ability. If we had, hers might have been a more gripping kind of performance."

Portrait in Black was filmed on location in San Francisco, including a sequence at the Devil's Slide on the Pacific Coast Highway (State Route 1).

It was the last of three screen collaborations between Sandra Dee and John Saxon.

== Reception ==
=== Box office ===
Portrait in Black earned $3,600,000 in theatrical rentals in the United States and Canada.

=== Critical reaction ===
The film was not well received by film critics.

A. H. Weiler of The New York Times wrote: "Despite the efforts of high-priced, popular and decorative artisans, Portrait in Black is hardly a work of art. It moves fitfully against colorful San Francisco backgrounds, its glossy, manufactured figures dulled by anguished infidelity superficial suspense and dialogue remenscient of confession magazines. For all its polish and Eastman color, this is a lackluster 'portrait' that is contrived rather than inspired."

Harrison's Reports called the film "A poor murder-suspense melodrama for its lavish, Eastman-colored, star-studded size ... The feature never really comes alive. Suspense is missing because the audience doesn't care."

Variety criticized the screenplay as a "contrived murder melodrama with psychological character interplay that is more psycho than logical ... The screenplay is incomplete and frequently preposterous but Michael Gordon's direction must be considered at least an equal partner in the deficiencies of the enterprise."

== Radio adaptation ==
Portrait in Black was presented on Theatre Guild on the Air on March 2, 1952. The one-hour adaptation starred Barbara Stanwyck and Richard Widmark.

== Home media ==
Portrait in Black was released on DVD in Region 1 as a Lana Turner double feature with Madame X by Universal Studios Home Entertainment on February 5, 2008. It was released on Blu-ray by Kino Lorber on May 28, 2019.

== See also ==
- List of American films of 1960
