= Caged (1950 film) =

1950 film

- Theatrical release poster
- Directed by: John Cromwell
- Written by: Bernard C. Schoenfeld; Virginia Kellogg
- Screenplay by: Virginia Kellogg
- Based on: Women Without Men article in Collier's by Bernard C. Schoenfeld; Virginia Kellogg
- Produced by: Jerry Wald
- Starring: Eleanor Parker; Agnes Moorehead; Betty Garde; Hope Emerson; Ellen Corby
- Cinematography: Carl E. Guthrie
- Edited by: Owen Marks
- Music by: Max Steiner
- Distributed by: Warner Bros. Pictures
- Release date: May 19, 1950
- Running time: 96 minutes
- Country: United States
- Language: English
- Box office: $1.5 million

Caged is a 1950 American film noir directed by John Cromwell and starring Eleanor Parker, Agnes Moorehead, Betty Garde, Hope Emerson, and Ellen Corby. It was adapted by Virginia Kellogg from the story "Women Without Men" by Kellogg and Bernard C. Schoenfeld.

The film portrays the story of a young newlywed sent to prison for armed robbery. Her brutal experiences while incarcerated, along with the killing of her husband, transform her from a meek, naive woman into a hardened convict. The film's subplot includes massive prison corruption.

Caged was nominated for three Academy Awards.

== Plot ==
19-year-old Marie Allen is sent to prison after a botched armed robbery attempt with her husband, Tom, who is killed. While receiving her initial prison physical examination, she learns that she is two months pregnant.

Marie has trouble adjusting to the monotonous and cutthroat world of the women's prison. She meets Kitty Stark, a murderous shoplifter, who promises Marie work as a thief when she is released. Kitty stresses the importance of toughness while incarcerated.

Informed that she may be paroled in ten months, Marie witnesses several prisoners who are granted parole but must remain in jail because their parole officers have not secured work for them. One such hopeless prisoner hangs herself and Marie's hopes for an early release steadily diminish.

Despite the rule of sadistic matron Evelyn Harper, Marie gives birth to a healthy but premature baby. She plans to grant temporary custody to her mother with the intent of taking the child after she is released, but Marie's stepfather will not allow the baby in his house. After Marie is denied parole, she tries half-heartedly to escape and the authorities force her to surrender her child for adoption.

The arrival of notorious criminal Elvira Powell triggers a rivalry with Kitty. Elvira bribes Harper to place Kitty in solitary confinement, where Kitty is beaten. When a kitten is found in the jail yard, Marie adopts it as a pet, but Harper tries to take it away, prompting the inmates to riot. The kitten is accidentally killed during the melee and Marie is punished for fighting with Harper.

Before taking Marie to a solitary-confinement cell, Harper shaves Marie's head, symbolically stripping her of her innocence. Harper has disagreements with sympathetic reformist prison superintendent Ruth Benton, especially after the latest incident with Marie. Because Harper is a political appointee, the police commissioner refuses to fire her and instead asks for Benton's resignation. When Benton declares that she will demand a public hearing, the resignation issue is dropped.

Kitty returns to her fellow inmates after serving a month in solitary confinement, but she is distraught and mentally unstable. After being harassed by Harper in the prison cafeteria, Kitty stabs her to death as the inmates watch and make no attempt to stop it. Marie, now hardened by her exposure to career criminals and sadistic guards, encourages Kitty in the fatal assault.

Eligible for parole once again, Marie claims to have secured a job outside the prison. However, the job is simply a ruse to win her release so that she can join Elvira's shoplifting gang. Marie leaves the institution a cynical, unscrupulous woman. At the conclusion, an office assistant asks Benton what to do with Marie's file, who replies: "Keep it active. She'll be back."

== Cast ==
- Eleanor Parker as Marie Allen
- Agnes Moorehead as Ruth Benton
- Ellen Corby as Emma Barber
- Hope Emerson as Evelyn Harper
- Betty Garde as Kitty Stark
- Sheila MacRae as Helen
- Jan Sterling as Jeta "Smoochie" Kovsky
- Lee Patrick as Elvira Powell
- Jane Darwell as Solitary Confinement Matron
- Gertrude W. Hoffmann as Millie
- Olive Deering as June Roberts
- Gertrude Michael as Georgia Harrison

== Production ==
In 1948, the studio had originally intended the film to be a vehicle for Bette Davis and Joan Crawford, but financial differences intervened. Davis reportedly rejected the film due to its implied lesbian content, referring to it as a "dyke movie".

== Reception ==
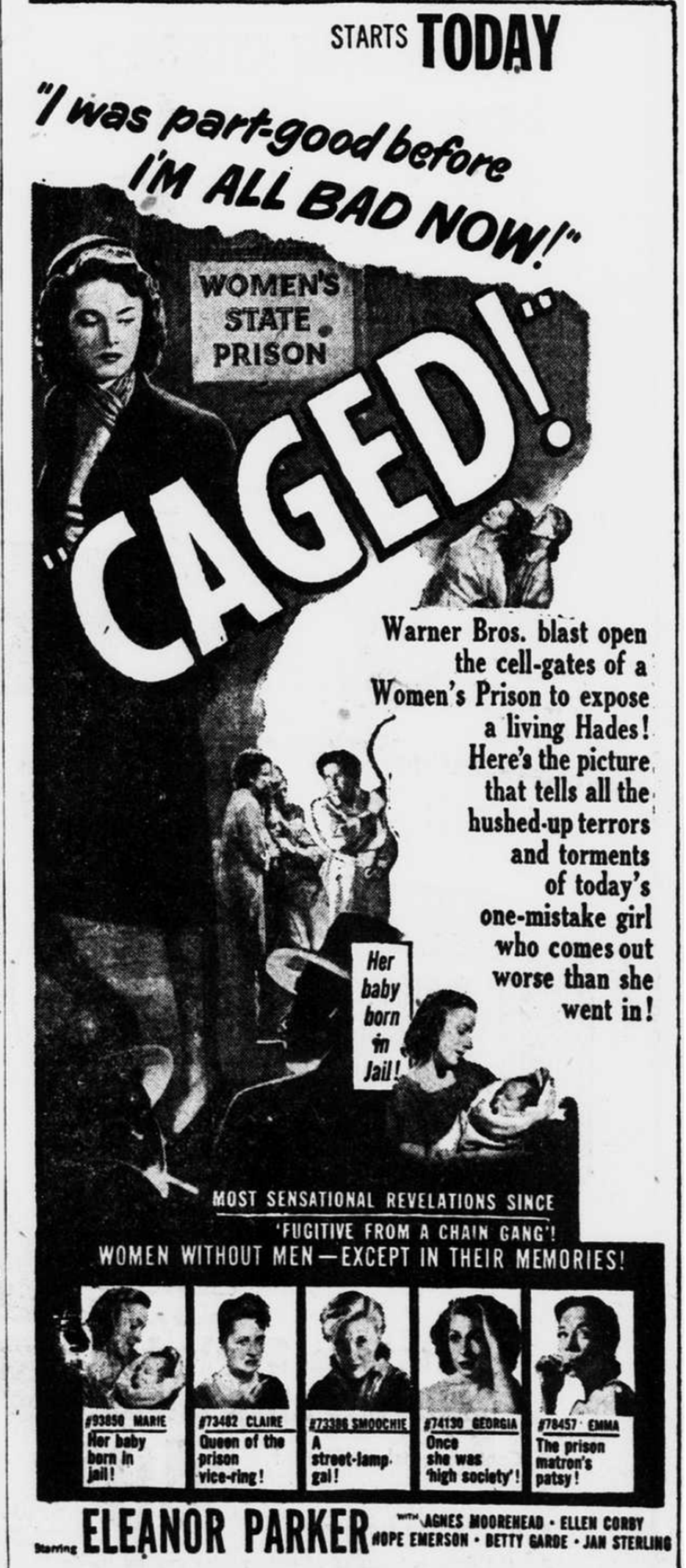
Theatrical advertisement from 1950

In 1950, Variety gave a mixed but predominantly positive review of Caged, characterizing it as a "grim, unrelieved study of cause and effect" that "still adds up to very drab entertainment". Nevertheless, Variety was very complimentary of nearly all aspects of the film's production, including its direction, editing, set designs, music, and cast performances, especially those of Parker and Emerson:

"Plot provides Eleanor Parker with what is known as a meaty femme role, completely deglamorized, and she plays it with considerable ability. There are other strong performances...all running true to the types depicted, and the most colorful is the sadistic prison matron socked over by Hope Emerson. ...The direction by John Cromwell and Jerry Wald's production draw a rather clear picture of the dreariness of prison life and the hopelessness it instills in all but the very strong inmate. There's high and low society, a definite blue book based on crime and convictions, among the prisoners....Art direction, set directions and the lensing by Carl Guthrie all emphasize the grimness of prison life. Cutting has done a good job in holding the footage to 96 minutes, and there is a Max Steiner score that fits the mood of the production."

Another American reviewer in 1950, Film Bulletin, gave generally high marks as well to Caged. The publication contended that the film's "stark, gripping" social commentary would be even more powerful if the "dismal atmosphere" of its storyline had at least a few contrasting lighter moments. “'Caged’”, Film Bulletin observed, "is to penal institutions what The Snake Pit was to mental institutions and The Lost Weekend to alcoholism."

In a much later review, critic Emanuel Levy in 2007 generally praised the film too:

...master of melodrama, John Cromwell directs in a taut style, coaxing excellent performances from his female-dominated cast..."Caged" walks a fine line between a socially conscious drama (and wake-up call) and exploitative, borderline campy fare.

Leonard Maltin's Movie Guide in 2014 favorably awarded Caged three out of four stars, describing the film overall as “stark” with "remarkable" performances.

== Accolades ==
Award	Category	Nominee(s)	Result
Academy Awards	Best Actress	Eleanor Parker	Nominated
Academy Awards	Best Supporting Actress	Hope Emerson	Nominated
Academy Awards	Best Story and Screenplay	Virginia Kellogg and Bernard C. Schoenfeld	Nominated
Venice International Film Festival	Golden Lion	John Cromwell	Nominated
Venice International Film Festival	Best Actress	Eleanor Parker	Won

== In popular culture ==
Caged is satirized in a 1977 SCTV comedy sketch as "Broads Behind Bars" with the character of Marie renamed "Cheryl" (and portrayed by comedian Catherine O'Hara). Cheryl is depicted as a teenager in the mid-to-late 1950s, who after smoking "pot" ends up in prison after being framed for armed robbery and also learns later that she is pregnant. The character of Kitty is played by Andrea Martin, while John Candy, in drag, plays the role of matron Harper (called "Schultzy"). A knife fight between Kitty and Harper occurs in the skit, instead of a fork as in the film, although both Kitty and Schultzy die. Kitty is fatally stabbed by Schultzy, and Schultzy is later killed by Cheryl. For her action, Cheryl is then told she can be released from prison, however, she responds by only laughing and declining the offer, echoing Kitty's remark in the original film, “No dice!” The skit, in the end, presents itself not only as a parody of “women-in-prison” movies like Caged but also as a spoof of the anti-marijuana films that were presented to students in many American high schools during the late 1950s and early 1960s.

== Bibliography ==
- Fertig, Mark (2014). Film Noir 101: The 101 Best Film Noir Posters from the 1940s-1950s. Seattle, Washington: Fantagraphics Books. ISBN 978-1-606-99759-8.
