= Stolen Holiday =

1937 film by Michael Curtiz

- DVD cover
- Directed by: Michael Curtiz
- Screenplay by: Casey Robinson
- Story by: Warren Duff; Virginia Kellogg
- Produced by: Hal B. Wallis
- Starring: Kay Francis; Claude Rains; Ian Hunter
- Cinematography: Sidney Hickox
- Edited by: Terry O. Morse
- Music by: Heinz Roemheld
- Production company: Warner Bros. Pictures
- Distributed by: Warner Bros. Pictures
- Release date: February 7, 1937
- Running time: 80 minutes
- Country: United States
- Language: English

Stolen Holiday is a 1937 American romantic drama film directed by Michael Curtiz and starring Kay Francis, Claude Rains and Ian Hunter. It is loosely based on the Stavisky Affair, a French political scandal. A Russian con artist digs his way into the upper reaches of French society, but is finally exposed, with tragic consequences.

== Plot ==
In 1931 Paris, Nicole Picot, a model for a fashionable dress shop, is hired by nearly-penniless Stefan Orloff to help persuade a financier to fund his ambitious plans. By 1934, Stefan has established an investment bank; in gratitude, he provides the capital that Nicole needs to set up her own business as successful dress designer (though she insists on paying him back). Her friend Suzanne warns Nicole against Stefan, saying this will all end badly, but Nicole doesn't listen. She's too happy to ignore Stefan's criminal dealings with a chance to become a modiste, her lifelong dream.

British diplomat Anthony Wayne romances Nicole and wins her heart. However, when Stefan's crooked schemes start to unravel in 1936, he asks Nicole to marry him without divulging his main motive: the attendance of her influential friends at the well-publicized ceremony would bolster public confidence in him and buy him time. She agrees from friendship alone, much to the distress of her friend and assistant, Suzanne. It is too late. At their wedding, Stefan's closest confederate, Francis Chalon, is taken away by the police for questioning and the other guests hastily depart.

Knowing that Chalon can incriminate him, Stefan goes into hiding at a remote chateau. However, he makes a mistake, sending a letter to Nicole asking her to join him. She does so, despite Anthony's protests. Nicole gets Stefan to admit the truth, though he insists he does love her.

When Stefan sees that the police have followed Nicole and have surrounded the chateau, he excuses himself. To spare her from being dragged down with him, he goes outside. As he expected, he is shot and killed, though the police stage it to look like a suicide to avoid causing further embarrassment to the government.

Nicole insists on repaying those whom Stefan defrauded, although she isn't liable under French law. By doing so, she goes bankrupt and loses her fashion house. She and Suzanne are back where they started and have clear consciences; Suzanne is glad they are quit of Stefan.

Anthony arrives while the women are packing their office. He finally persuades Nicole to agree to marry him, despite her concern that her tarnished reputation will damage his career.

== Cast ==
- Kay Francis as Nicole Picot
- Claude Rains as Stefan Orloff
- Ian Hunter as Anthony Wayne
- Alison Skipworth as Suzanne
- Alexander D'Arcy as Leon Anatole
- Betty Lawford as Helen Tuttle
- Walter Kingsford as Francis Chalon
- Charles Halton as LeGrande
- Frank Reicher as Charles Ranier
- Frank Conroy as Dupont
- Egon Brecher as Bergery
- Robert Strange as Prefect of Police
- Wedgwood Nowell as M. Borel

== Critical reception ==
Variety’s reviewer commented that although the film "plucks the drama from the Stavinsky scandal in France", the producers would be wary about admitting that and therefore the film opens with a note saying "all characters are fictitious." Despite the source material, the reviewer believed that "as a story Stolen Holiday isn’t possessed of the strongest dramatic or romantic pull. It is the production values, the unusually good dialogue and the superiority of the cast which combine to raise the picture." The main performances were commended. "[Kay Francis] and Hunter are opposite each other for the third time. A good combination. Rains gives the swindler-romancer a high polish. Comedy is derived largely from Alison Skipworth, who is excellent as Miss Francis’ friend and advisor."

In their March, 1937 edition, Modern Screen gave the film a two-star review and wrote that the plot served mainly to provide a setting for Kay Francis to display her "fine gowns." It said that Claude Rains "dominates the cast" and concluded, "If you like lavish settings, fashion shows, Kay Francis in another sympathetic role tailored to her talents, you will see it …. Alison Skipworth contributes necessary humor to the proceedings."

== Preservation ==
In addition to being held by Warner Bros., the film is preserved in the Library of Congress collection.

== Bibliography ==
- Rode, Alan K. Michael Curtiz: A Life in Film. University Press of Kentucky, 2017.
