= Mary Stevens, M.D. =

1933 film by Lloyd Bacon

- Film poster
- Directed by: Lloyd Bacon
- Screenplay by: Rian James; Robert Lord
- Story by: Virginia Kellogg
- Produced by: Hal B. Wallis
- Starring: Kay Francis; Lyle Talbot
- Cinematography: Sid Hickox
- Edited by: Ray Curtiss
- Music by: Bernhard Kaun
- Production company: Warner Bros. Pictures
- Release date: July 22, 1933
- Running time: 72 minutes
- Country: United States
- Language: English

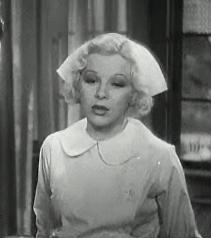
Glenda Farrell as Glenda in the film

Mary Stevens, M.D. is a 1933 American pre-Code drama film starring Kay Francis, Lyle Talbot and Glenda Farrell. The film was directed by Lloyd Bacon and based on the story by Virginia Kellogg. It was released by Warner Bros. Pictures on July 22, 1933. A female doctor who has romantic troubles decides to have a baby without the benefit of marriage.

== Plot ==
Mary Stevens and her old friend Don Andrews find themselves graduating from medical school at the same time. They decide to set up their respective medical offices in the same building. Mary builds her reputation despite many patients refusing to be treated by a woman. Don, however, begins dating Lois Cavanaugh, whose family is rich and influential, and neglects his practice for the privileges of a social life.

Despite Mary's love for Don, he marries Lois and sets up a new office with a high class clientele. He also gives Mary a new office right next to his; while she ends up making a name for herself in the medical community, Don begins to pilfer funds from his practice. Jealousy and mistrust drive Mary and Don apart, seemingly for good.

Two years go by and Mary, now a famous doctor, takes a much-needed vacation. While on vacation she runs into Don, who is now on the lam from the authorities. Mary and Don have an affair, and Don tries to get a divorce. Lois is willing but her father doesn't want the Cavanaugh name mixed up in any scandal. He clears Don's name and gets all charges against Don dropped, on the condition that Don will not divorce Lois for at least six months. When Mary finds herself pregnant with Don's child and Don unable to marry her, she must decide whether she should tell Don or raise the child on her own.

While returning on a ship, several children develop polio including her baby, who dies 2 days before they dock. A despondent Mary is caught in the act of suicide and saves a child in the final scene. Mary regains her confidence and the couple reunites.

== Cast ==
- Kay Francis as Mary Stevens
- Lyle Talbot as Don
- Glenda Farrell as Glenda
- Thelma Todd as Lois
- Harold Huber as Tony
- Una O'Connor as Mrs. Arnell Simmons
- Charles Wilson as Walter Rising
- Hobart Cavanaugh as Alf Simmons

== Production ==
Multiple scenes of Mary Stevems, M.D. were shot in The Greenbrier.
