= Screaming Eagles (film) =

1956 American historical war film

- Original film poster
- Directed by: Charles F. Haas
- Written by: David Lang; Robert Presnell Jr.
- Story by: Virginia Kellogg
- Produced by: Samuel Bischoff; David Diamond
- Starring: Tom Tryon; Jan Merlin; Jacqueline Beer
- Cinematography: Harry Neumann
- Edited by: Robert S. Eisen
- Music by: Harry Sukman
- Color process: black-and-white
- Production company: Bischoff-Diamond Corporation
- Distributed by: Allied Artists
- Release date: May 27, 1956
- Running time: 79 minutes
- Language: English

Screaming Eagles is a 1956 American historical war film directed by Charles F. Haas starring Tom Tryon, Jan Merlin and, in her film debut, French Miss Universe 1954 runner-up Jacqueline Beer. It was released by Allied Artists.

The story is set in World War II during the night of the Normandy invasion where the 101st Airborne Division parachutes into France. The title of the film refers to the nickname of the division based on its shoulder sleeve insignia.

The film is notable for its large cast of up-and-coming actors.

== Plot ==
Before the Normandy landings, new recruits Mason, Corliss and Talbot are assigned to the 1st Platoon, "D" Company, 502nd Parachute Infantry Regiment. Mason gets off on the wrong foot with certain members of the platoon, mainly Sgt. Forrest and Cpl. Dreef. Mason gets drunk as he reads a Dear John letter from his girlfriend back home. The platoon's passes into town are canceled because the men are on standby for the invasion and restricted to barracks. When the platoon returns to the barracks, they find it destroyed by a drunken Mason. Platoon leader Lt. Pauling keeps Mason in the platoon and gives him a chance despite his behavior. Lt. Pauling talks to the platoon about Mason's behavior and Corliss speaks positively about him. The men also decide to take a chance on him, including Grimes, Dubrowski and Foley.

The 502nd find themselves boarding troop planes that will be flying over Normandy, marking the beginning of Operation Overlord. Jumpmaster Sgt. Forrest instructs the men regarding the jump and their mission when on the ground. The platoon is tasked to set up roadblocks and hold a bridge along the Douve, and their drop zone is a mile beyond that of 2nd Battalion. Only seconds after the planes fly over the coast, the Germans man anti-aircraft cannons and aim them toward the planes. Peterson is killed when flak hits the plane.

After the men jump out of the aircraft, they realize that they did not land in their assigned drop zone, but create a rallying point. The platoon heads out and Lt. Pauling gives the order to not engage the enemy singlehandedly. The men split up into three groups and they scout the area. Mason sees a German sentry aiming his rifle at Cpl. Dreef and kills the sentry, which results in a firefight in which Cpl. Dreef is killed. Not having seen what Mason did, the others blame him for a hotheaded stunt. After the platoon meets back at their rallying point, the platoon is outraged when Dubrowski tells them what happened. A German soldier fires at Lt. Pauling, and the bullet flash burns him. Sgt. Forrest selects Mason to take care of Lt. Pauling, who is now suffering from blindness.

The platoon attacks a German-occupied farmhouse later that morning, resulting in the deaths of Lambert, Hernandez and Nolan. After the firefight, the platoon raids the house, finding German soldier Hans Schacht holding a French girl named Marianne hostage. Hans is taken prisoner and Marianne volunteers to aid Lt. Pauling. Hans informs the platoon that there are 300 German soldiers between them and the Douve.

The platoon hijacks a German truck and forces the driver to take them to a tavern that is being used as a German headquarters. At gunpoint, Hans telephones false orders to draw German troops away from their positions. He then seizes a chance to telephone again so that the Germans can hear the platoon chattering in English. A truckload of Germans raid the tavern and Hans is killed by friendly fire. Talbot, Foley, Smith and Torren are killed, and Mason is wounded in the arm.

The seven surviving members of the party (Mason, Lt. Pauling, Marianne, Corliss, Sgt. Forrest, Grimes and Dubrowski) escape by truck. By midday, the party links up with the rest of "D" Company at the bridge that they were supposed to hold. Lt. Pauling bids farewell to Marianne before he and Mason are driven to a field hospital.

== Cast ==
- Tom Tryon as Pvt. Mason
- Jan Merlin as Lt. Pauling
- Jacqueline Beer as Marianne
- Alvy Moore as Pvt. Grimes
- Martin Milner as Pvt. Corliss
- Joe di Reda as Pvt. Dubrowski
- Mark Damon as Pvt. Lambert
- Paul Burke as Cpl. Dreef
- Pat Conway as Sgt. Forrest
- Edward G. Robinson Jr. as Pvt. Smith
- Robert Blake as Pvt. Hernandez
- Robert Boon as Hans Schacht
- Ralph Votrian as Pvt. Talbot
- Paul Smith as Pvt. Foley
- Robert Roark as Pvt. Torren
- Robert Dix as Pvt. Peterson
- Wayne Taylor as Pvt. Nolan

== Production ==
Parts of the film were filmed at Fort Benning, Georgia. The technical advisers were Richard Haynes Case, a D-Day veteran of the 101st and Werner Klingler, a German film director who also had a role in the film. Case had also acted as an adviser to The Man in the Gray Flannel Suit the same year.

Jan Merlin recalled that he was originally supposed to play Private Mason because of his reputation for playing villains. As his character was to continually carry the blinded lieutenant who was to have been played by the much taller Tom Tryon, the men agreed to switch their roles.

== See also ==
- List of American films of 1956
- List of World War II films
- 502nd Parachute Infantry Regiment
- The Longest Day (film)
