= The Road to Reno (1931 film) =

1931 film

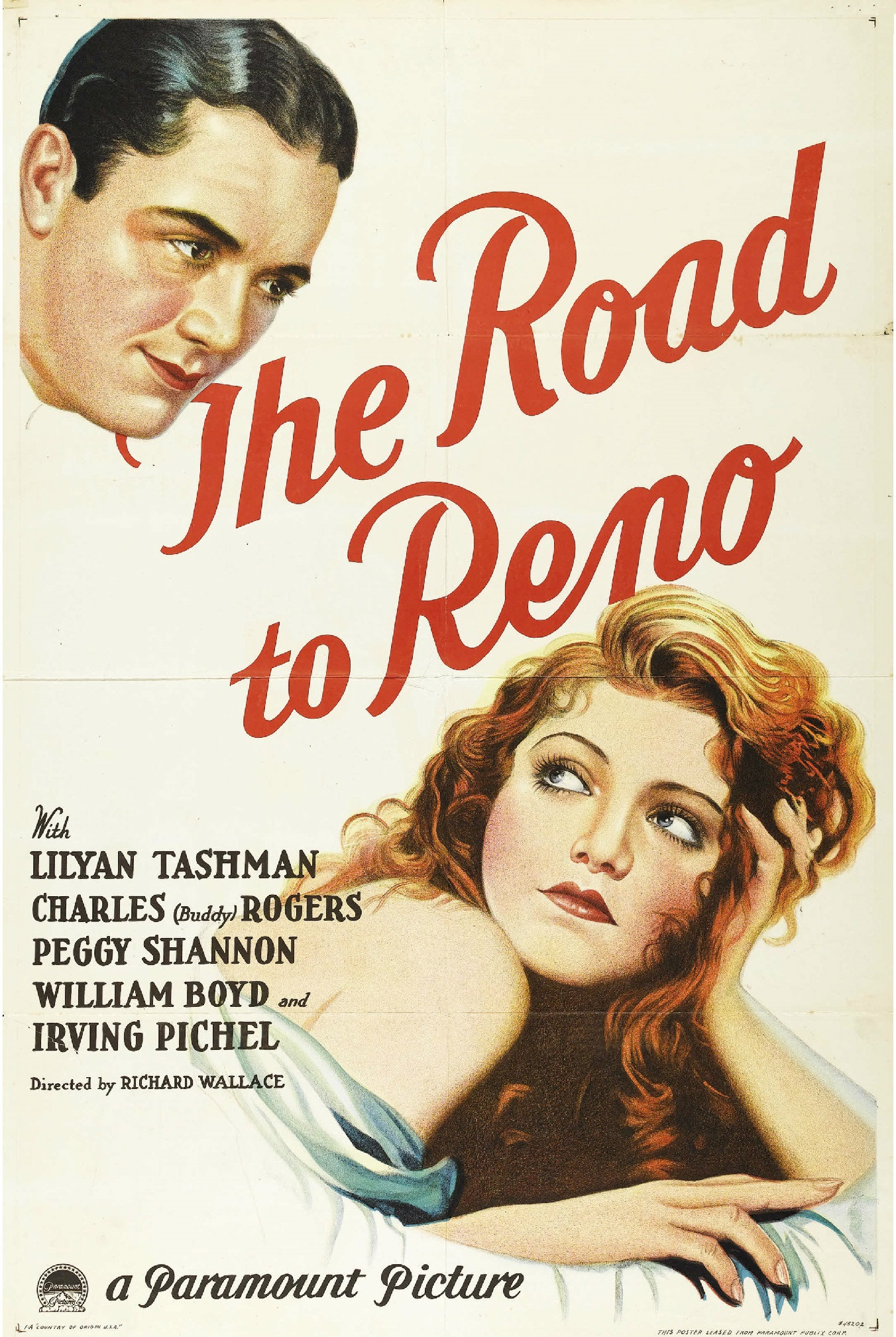
- The Road to Reno film poster
- Directed by: Richard Wallace
- Written by: Virginia Kellogg (story); Josephine Lovett (screenplay)
- Starring: Lilyan Tashman; Charles "Buddy" Rogers; Peggy Shannon; William "Stage" Boyd
- Music by: Rudolph G. Kopp; John Leipold
- Distributed by: Paramount Pictures
- Release date: October 13, 1931
- Running time: 74 minutes
- Country: United States
- Language: English

The Road to Reno is a 1931 American pre-Code drama film directed by Richard Wallace and starring Lilyan Tashman, Charles "Buddy" Rogers, Peggy Shannon, and William "Stage" Boyd.

== Plot ==
Twice-divorced Jackie Millett tries one more time with number three. Unfortunately, her wedding is suddenly halted when the woman's son kills the groom during the ceremony, and then shoots himself.

== Cast ==
- Lilyan Tashman as Mrs. Jackie Millett
- Charles "Buddy" Rogers as Tom Wood
- Peggy Shannon as Lee Millett
- William "Stage" Boyd as Jerry Kenton
- Irving Pichel as Robert Millett
- Wynne Gibson as Mrs. Fitch
- Richard "Skeets" Gallagher as Hoppie
- Tom Douglas as Jeff Millett
- Judith Wood as Elise Kenton (Note: Often listed as Elsie, a man calls her Elise (38:11), as do the end credits.)
- Leni Stengel as Mrs. Stafford-Howes
- Emile Chautard as Andre

== See also ==
- The House That Shadows Built (1931 promotional film by Paramount)
