= The Rogues (TV series) =

American television series (1964–1965)

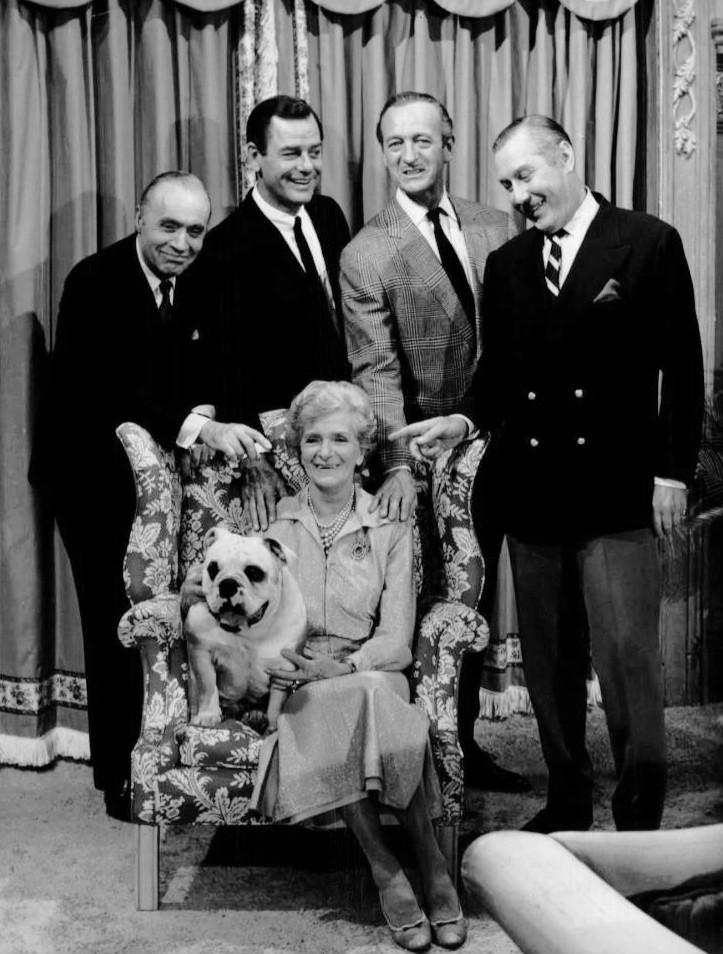
- Cast of the program for its 1964 premiere (Charles Boyer, Gig Young, David Niven, Robert Coote, and Gladys Cooper)
- Created by: Ivan Goff; Ben Roberts
- Starring: David Niven; Charles Boyer; Gig Young
- Opening theme: "The Rogues", by Nelson Riddle
- Composers: Nelson Riddle; Joseph Mullendore
- Country of origin: United States
- No. of episodes: 30

Production
- Executive producer: Thomas J. McDermott
- Producer: Collier Young
- Running time: 50 mins
- Production company: Four Star-GIYO

Original release
- Network: NBC
- Release: September 13, 1964 – April 18, 1965

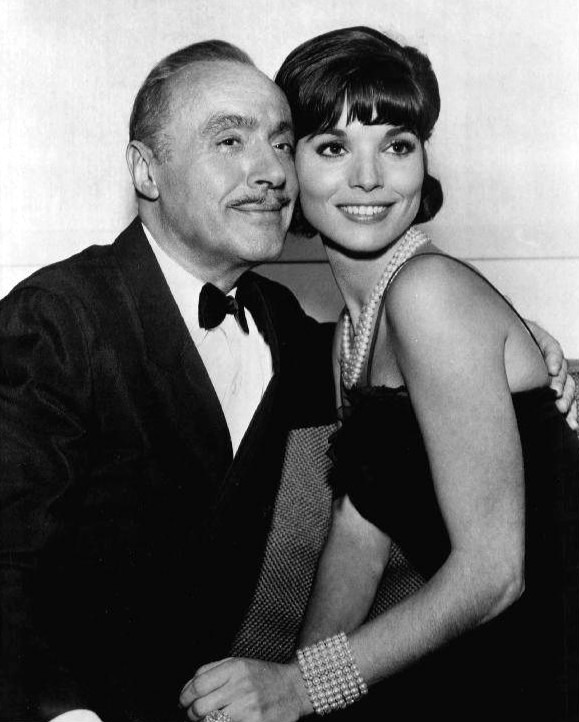
Charles Boyer and Elsa Martinelli

The Rogues is an American television series that aired on NBC from September 13, 1964, to April 18, 1965, starring David Niven, Charles Boyer, and Gig Young as a related trio of former con men who could, for the right price, be persuaded to trick a very wealthy and heinously unscrupulous mark. Although it won the 1964 Golden Globe award for Best Television Series, the show was cancelled after one season consisting of thirty episodes.

== Production ==
Niven and Boyer were two of the co-owners of Four Star Television, which produced the show.

Although sometimes appearing together, the three lead actors tended to rotate appearances as their schedules permitted. This resulted in Young helming more episodes because the other two were engaged on other projects; Boyer and Niven were still major film stars (Niven had received an Academy Award for Best Actor in 1958).

Larry Hagman was brought aboard for the last two episodes to help fill in for Young, who had been the lead in most of the episodes. The only episode in which Niven and Boyer had more or less equal roles was "Bless You, G. Carter Huntington," which also featured Young in a substantial capacity. Niven briefly appears in a number of episodes (often toward the beginning of the show), but took the lead in only three out of the series' thirty episodes because of his film schedule. Many of his scenes were shot separately in other locations, especially later in the series.

Additional continuity was provided by the presences of Gladys Cooper as Auntie Margaret St. Clair and Robert Coote as Timmy St. Clair, appearing in their supporting roles in most episodes.

Guest stars included Eddie Albert, Tol Avery, Broderick Crawford, John Dehner, Sally Kellerman, Ida Lupino (also a member of Four Star Television though not an owner), Elsa Martinelli, Walter Matthau, Darren McGavin, Dina Merrill, Susan Oliver, George Sanders, Telly Savalas, Gia Scala, Everett Sloane, Raquel Welch and Marie Windsor.

Four Star President David Charnay announced a feature film revival to star David Niven and Charles Boyer, scheduled for 1968, but nothing came of it. In 1989, Blake Edwards optioned the series for a revival, but ABC passed on the unproduced pilot script in 1990.

Repeats of the series were aired on Me-TV during 2011-2012 and again in September 2014, and on Decades in March 2015. Commencing in 2018, the show was broadcast in the United Kingdom on Talking Pictures TV.

== Cast ==
- David Niven as Alexander "Alec" Fleming
- Charles Boyer as Marcel St. Clair
- Gig Young as Tony Fleming
- Gladys Cooper as Auntie Margaret St. Clair
- Robert Coote as Timmy St. Clair
- Larry Hagman as Mark Fleming (came on halfway through season)
- John Williams as Inspector Briscoe
- Barbara Bouchet as Elsa Idonescu

== Episodes ==
No.	Title	Starring	Directed by	Written by	Original release date
1	"The Personal Touch"	Niven, Young	Hy Averback	Ivan Goff & Ben Roberts	September 13, 1964
2	"The Day They Gave the Diamonds Away"	Boyer, Young, Niven	Richard Kinon	Story by : Barney Slater; Teleplay by : Barney Slater & Stephen Kandel	September 20, 1964
3	"The Stefanini Dowry"	Young, Boyer	Hy Averback	Marion Hargrove	September 27, 1964
4	"Viva Diaz!"	Niven, Boyer, Young	Robert Ellis Miller	Stephen Kandel	October 4, 1964
5	"House of Cards"	Young, Niven	Richard Kinon	Robin Estridge	October 11, 1964
6	"Death of a Fleming"	Boyer, Niven, Young	Robert Ellis Miller	Lorenzo Semple Jr.	October 25, 1964
7	"The Project Man"	Young	Robert Ellis Miller	Ellis St. Joseph	November 1, 1964
8	"Two of a Kind"	Boyer	Robert Ellis Miller	Leonard Kantor	November 8, 1964
9	"Take Me to Paris"	Young, Boyer	Lewis Allen	Story by : Alan Caillou; Teleplay by : Alan Caillou & Stephen Kandel	November 15, 1964
10	"Fringe Benefits"	Niven, Boyer	Hy Averback	Robert Buckner	November 22, 1964
11	"Plavonia, Hail and Farewell"	Young, Boyer, Niven	Robert Ellis Miller	Story by : Robert A. Cinader; Teleplay by : Carey Wilber	November 29, 1964
12	"The Boston Money Party"	Young, Boyer	Robert Ellis Miller	Richard Levinson & William Link	December 6, 1964
13	"The Computer Goes West"	Boyer	William A. Graham	Wells Root & Ron Bishop	December 13, 1964
14	"Hugger-Mugger, by the Sea"	Young, Boyer, Niven	Ida Lupino	Story by : Stephen Lord; Teleplay by : Stephen Lord & Stephen Kandel	December 20, 1964
15	"The Real Russian Caviar"	Boyer, Young	John Newland	Story by : Stuart Jerome; Teleplay by : Stuart Jerome & Stephen Kandel	December 27, 1964
16	"Money is for Burning"	Young	Lewis Allen	Warren Duff	January 3, 1965
17	"Gambit by the Golden Gate"	Boyer, Young, Niven	Hy Averback	Jon Boothe	January 10, 1965
18	"Bless You, G. Carter Huntington"	Niven, Boyer, Young	Hy Averback	Warren Duff	January 17, 1965
19	"The Golden Ocean"	Young, Boyer	Lewis Allen	Stephen Kandel & Francis Cockrell	January 24, 1965
20	"The Diamond-Studded Pie"	Young, Boyer	Lewis Allen	Charles Hoffman	January 31, 1965
21	"Bow to a Master"	Young, Boyer	Ida Lupino	Story by : William Bast; Teleplay by : William Bast & Stephen Kandel	February 7, 1965
22	"Run for the Money"	Young	Lewis Allen	Story by : Robert Buckner; Teleplay by : Ivan Goff & Ben Roberts and Stephen Kandel	February 14, 1965
23	"The Laughing Lady of Luxor"	Boyer	Richard Kinon	Story by : Ellis St. Joseph; Teleplay by : Ron Bishop & Stephen Kandel & Wells Root	February 21, 1965
24	"The Bartered MacBride"	Young	Lewis Allen	Roger H. Lewis & Stephen Kandel	February 28, 1965
25	"The Pigeons of Paris"	Boyer	Don Taylor	Story by : Walter Black; Teleplay by : Walter Black & Tony Barrett	March 7, 1965
26	"Our Men in Marawat"	Boyer	Richard Kinon	Samuel A. Peeples	March 14, 1965
27	"Wherefore Art Thou, Harold?"	Young, Boyer	Lewis Allen	Story by : Richard DeRoy; Teleplay by : Richard DeRoy & Stephen Kandel	March 21, 1965
28	"Grave Doubts"	Young, Boyer, Niven	Theodore J. Flicker	Edmund H. North	March 28, 1965
29	"Mr. White's Christmas"	Boyer, Hagman	Don Taylor	Warren Duff	April 4, 1965
30	"A Daring Step Backward"	Boyer, Niven, Hagman	Lewis Allen	Tom Waldman and Frank Waldman & Stephen Kandel	April 18, 1965

== Awards and nominations ==
Year	Result	Award	Category	Recipient
1965	Winner	Golden Globe Award	Best TV Show	
1965	Nominated	Emmy Award	Outstanding Individual Achievements in Entertainment - Actors and Performers	Robert Coote
1965	Nominated	Emmy Award	Outstanding Individual Achievements in Entertainment - Actors and Performers	Gladys Cooper

== In popular culture ==
Issue #97 of Mad magazine (September 1965) parodied The Rogues as The Rooks.
