= Ivan Goff =

Australian screenwriter (1910–1999)

- Born: 17 April 1910; Perth, Australia
- Died: 23 September 1999 (aged 89); Santa Monica, California, U.S.
- Occupation: Screenwriter
- Years active: 1933–1999

Ivan Goff (17 April 1910 – 23 September 1999) was an Australian screenwriter, best known for his collaborations with Ben Roberts including White Heat (1949), Man of a Thousand Faces (1957), Legend of the Lone Ranger (1981), and the pilot for Charlie's Angels (1976).

== Biography ==
=== Early years ===
Goff was born in Perth, the son of two concert musicians. He attended Perth Boys High School (1922) and Perth Modern School (1923–26), and grew up in Claremont.

At 15, he began writing for a local newspaper, but soon became dissatisfied with the isolation he felt. "Living in Australia made me crazy", he later said in an interview. "It took a month for a book to get to Australia, a year for a play and forever for an idea."

=== Leaving for England ===
Goff was the private secretary to novelist Louis Goulding.

Goff was working for The West Australian as a journalist but resigned from his job in April 1930 to travel to the US. Travelling with a friend, E Irwin, he went via Sydney and Auckland, then Fiji – where they were arrested for stowing away on a ship – before arriving in Canada. They eventually arrived in the US and went to Los Angeles. and Mexico, writing for the "Sporting Globe". Eventually, they made their way to London in July 1931. He and Irwin later published a book of their travels called No Longer Innocent in late 1933. This was well received.

He worked in several jobs, including as a bookie, while trying to break into journalism. He eventually found work with the Daily Mirror, which in the mid-1930s sent Goff to Los Angeles as the paper's Hollywood correspondent.

=== Hollywood ===
Goff worked as a journalist in Hollywood. In January 1937 he signed a writing contract with Warner Bros. He was linked romantically with fellow Australian expatriate, actor Constance Worth. He adapted the book The Story of San Michele although it was not made. In 1938, he was reported as working on a version of Svengali.

He eventually became a staff writer at Republic Studios. His work included uncredited contributions to several of the westerns in The Three Mesquiteers series, and a Gene Autry vehicle, Sunset in Wyoming (1941). At Republic Goff first met Ben Roberts who says Goff was working on a Three Mesquiteers script for John Wayne while Roberts was collaborating with Sidney Sheldon on a district attorney movie. Roberts called Goff "a fellow with a proper English accent... We couldn't figure out what he was doing, writing a cowboy movie. We assumed his idea of dialogue was writing 'Cut them off at the pass, dear chaps'."

Goff then joined the staff at Warner Bros. He was working on a picture called Stuff of Heroes for Jane Bryan.

Goff wrote a film for Columbia, The Out for Movies. He was one of several writers on an A-picture, My Love Came Back (1940) and did some uncredited work on The Great Mr. Nobody (1941). He was an early writer on The Horn Blows at Midnight. He wrote a never-filmed script about an American soldier in Australia, Private Eddie Lawson.

=== Ben Roberts and Portrait in Black ===
During World War II, Goff joined the Army Signal Corps where he found himself making wartime propaganda shorts at the former Astoria Studios in Long Island, New York. At Astoria, Goff was reunited with Ben Roberts. One day over lunch Roberts told Goff of an idea he had for a short story that lacked an ending. Goff came up with an ending and suggested that they turn it into a play instead of a short story. Working at night over a period of 13 months, they completed the play, which was called Portrait in Black and had runs in London and Broadway. It also sold to the movies for $100,000.

Goff was also credited on a comedy for PRC, The Captain from Köpenick (1945). It would be the last film he wrote without Roberts for the rest of his career. Goff later said in 1976 that he and Roberts "complement each other's talent and personality. While I was stowing away on freighters and trains, bumming around the world, Ben was sneaking on the New York subway. But we respect each other, making creative compromise possible."

At the end of the war, Roberts and Goff decided to remain as a team, and wrote Prejudice (1949), a short film about anti-Semitism produced by the Protestant Film Commission.

They also wrote a screenplay based on a Ben Hecht story, The Shadow, which was never filmed, but attracted the interest of Warner Bros. who hired them to rewrite a murder mystery, Backfire (made in 1948, released in 1950). Their work on that film impressed the studio enough to sign them to a five-year contract.

=== Warner Bros. ===
Although Goff and Roberts considered themselves primarily comedy writers, Warners saw them as action men and assigned them to rewrite another script, a gangster story called White Heat (1949). White Heat was based on a story submitted to the studio by Virginia Kellogg, which had been inspired by a real-life robbery. Goff and Roberts turned Kellogg's story inside out, making it a semi 'Greek tragedy' about a gangster with a mother complex. James Cagney agreed to star, Raoul Walsh directed and the resulting film became an instant classic. Kellogg was nominated for an Oscar for Best Original Story, but, under Academy rules of the time, Goff and Roberts were not. In an essay on the making of the film and writing of the script, writer Patrick McGilligan observed:

Goff and Roberts regard themselves as slow, methodical craftsmen. They plot in complete detail before even beginning to write. Then they write their dialogue together, line by line. Roberts seems to be the better constructionist... Goff gets the nod for detail and dialogue. Yet they work together so closely that it is difficult to separate their individual contributions, and what usually emerges is a blending of both their selves. "Our contention, and I think it's borne out by the scripts we’ve done", said Roberts, "is that the style of the script is neither my style nor Ivan's, but a third person's."

Warners put the team on to an early draft of Mara Maru for which they were not credited. They worked on Captain Horatio Hornblower (1951), with Gregory Peck in the title role, then were reunited with Cagney on Come Fill the Cup (1951). They wrote a Joan Crawford vehicle, Goodbye, My Fancy (1952), provided the original story for a British film, Gift Horse (1952) and were among several writers on the anthology film O. Henry's Full House (1952), for 20th Century Fox.

Goff and Roberts stayed with Fox for two adventure films, White Witch Doctor (1953) and King of the Khyber Rifles (1954).

From 1954 to 1955, Goff served as president of the screenwriters' council of the Screen Writers Guild.

At MGM they wrote another adventure tale, Green Fire (1954) then returned to Warners to do a musical melodrama with Mario Lanza, Serenade (1956), from a novel by James M. Cain. At Warners they did a Civil War era saga for Raoul Walsh, Band of Angels (1957), then made a third film with Cagney, Man of a Thousand Faces (1957), a biopic of Lon Chaney which earned Goff and Roberts an Oscar nomination..

They wrote a pilot for a TV series that was never made, The Fat Man (1959). Cagney used them again for an IRA thriller, Shake Hands with the Devil (1959) and they wrote an episode of Bourbon Street Beat (1960).

1960 finally saw the release of a film version of Portrait in Black. It was produced by Ross Hunter who used Goff and Roberts on a similar thriller, Midnight Lace (1960). They wrote a third film for Hunter, a remake of Next Time We Love, for Doris Day and Rock Hudson, but it was not made.

They did the never-made The Sea Wolves about John P. Cromwell in World War II.

=== Television ===
During the 1960s Goff and Roberts turned increasingly to television. They wrote a pilot for a show starring Rod Taylor, Dateline: San Francisco (1962) which was not picked up.

They created and wrote The Rogues (1964).

They wrote the pilot for a series, Preview Tonight (1968) which was not picked up, and wrote a thriller in South Africa, The Second Sin (1966).

Three for Danger (1967) was another unsold pilot but they wrote an episode of Ironside and The Danny Thomas Hour, and enjoyed great success as writers and producers for Mannix (1968–75) from its second season onwards, overseeing significant changes on the show. A profile of Goff and Roberts from 1968 said that "the rapport between the producers is quite apparent. One complements the other. One will back off if the other makes a point more succinctly. Goff, perhaps a touch more serious in manner, speaks with an Aussie accent. Roberts is a quick talker and has a laugh slightly reminiscent of Ed Wynn's."

A TV series they created My Friend Tony (1969) was less successful although it ran a season.

They wrote some thrillers, Diagnosis: Murder (1975) and The Killer Who Wouldn't Die (1976) (starring Mike Connors from Mannix) and had enormous success creating and writing the pilot for Charlie's Angels (1976–81). Goff and Roberts subsequently left the series, and Goff had said "[the producers] wanted us to write in a lot of car chases and to put guns in the hands of the girls; we walked." The two were entitled to 12.5% of the show's profits and were part of a lawsuit against Aaron Spelling and Leonard Goldberg to have a correct accounting done.

Goff and Roberts were the main writers of the TV series Logan's Run (1976). They also created the short-lived Time Express (1979) and produced Nero Wolfe (1981). They were among the many writers on The Legend of the Lone Ranger (1981).

Roberts died in 1984.

=== Later years ===
Goff lived in Malibu towards the end of his life. He died of Alzheimer's disease in 1999 in his sleep at St John's Health Centre in Santa Monica.

== Filmography ==
- My Love Came Back (1940)
- Sunset in Wyoming (1941)
- The Captain from Köpenick (completed in 1941, but only released in 1945)
- White Heat (1949) (w/Ben Roberts)
- Prejudice (1949) (with Ben Roberts)
- Backfire (1950) (with Ben Roberts)
- Captain Horatio Hornblower (1951) (with Ben Roberts)
- Come Fill the Cup (1951) (with Ben Roberts)
- Goodbye My Fancy (1951) (with Ben Roberts)
- O Henry's Full House (1952) (with Ben Roberts)
- The Gift Horse (1952) – story only (with Ben Roberts)
- King of the Khyber Rifles (1953) (with Ben Roberts)
- White Witch Doctor (1953) (with Ben Roberts)
- Green Fire (1954) (with Ben Roberts)
- Serenade (1956) (with Ben Roberts)
- Band of Angels (1957) (with Ben Roberts)
- Man of a Thousand Faces (1957) (with Ben Roberts)
- Shake Hands With the Devil (1959) (with Ben Roberts)
- Portrait in Black (1960) + play (with Ben Roberts)
- Midnight Lace (1960) (with Ben Roberts)
- The Second Sin (1966) (with Ben Roberts)
- The Killer Who Wouldn't Die (1976) (with Ben Roberts)
- The Legend of the Lone Ranger (1981) (with Ben Roberts)

== TV series ==
- Burke's Law (1963) (with Ben Roberts)
- The Rogues (1964) (with Ben Roberts)
- Ironside (1967) (with Ben Roberts)
- Mannix (1967–75) (with Ben Roberts)
- Charlie's Angels (1976–81) (with Ben Roberts)
- Logan's Run (1977–1978) (with Ben Roberts)
- Time Express (1979) (with Ben Roberts)

== Notes ==
- Vagg, Stephen (28 July 2019). "Unsung Aussie Filmmakers: Ivan Goff – a Top Ten". Filmink.
