= Come Fill the Cup =

1951 film

- Theatrical release poster
- Directed by: Gordon Douglas
- Screenplay by: Ivan Goff; Ben Roberts
- Based on: Come, Fill the Cup by Harlan Ware
- Produced by: Henry Blanke
- Starring: James Cagney; Phyllis Thaxter; Gig Young; Raymond Massey; James Gleason
- Cinematography: Robert Burks
- Edited by: Alan Crosland Jr.
- Music by: Ray Heindorf
- Distributed by: Warner Bros. Pictures
- Release date: October 24, 1951
- Running time: 113 minutes
- Country: United States
- Language: English

Come Fill the Cup is a 1951 film starring James Cagney and Gig Young, directed by Gordon Douglas. Young's performance was nominated for an Academy Award for Best Supporting Actor.

Cagney plays an alcoholic newspaperman. He has a memorable line, "Don't you see? I am home," in response to the query, "Why don't you go home?" at two points in the film, once near the beginning when he is drinking; once at the end when he is at work.

== Plot ==
Lew Marsh is a good newspaper reporter with a bad habit; he drinks too much and is fired. He also loses the woman he loves, colleague Paula Arnold, after passing out drunk one day in the street.

An ex-alcoholic, Charley Dolan, takes pity on Lew, offering him a room at his apartment and finding him a job with a construction crew. Lew is tempted to have a drink when he learns that Paula has married another man, Boyd Copeland, the nephew of Lew's former boss at the newspaper, John Ives.

Ives gives the newly sober Lew a second chance at the paper. Many months pass, during which time Lew not only remains sober but is helpful to others with the same illness. This comes to the attention of Ives, who is worried about Boyd's increased drinking.

Lew learns that Boyd has been unfaithful to Paula, taking up with a singer named Maria who is loved by a jealous gangster named Lennie Garr. To help, Lew invites Boyd to come live with Charley and him. He also helps the lonely Paula return to work for the newspaper, secretly hoping that she will fall in love with him again.

Garr and a henchman rig a car in a bid to murder Boyd, but end up killing Charley by mistake. A depressed Boyd feels responsible and tries to commit suicide. Boyd gets in touch with Maria, but they are being followed by Garr and another thug. At gunpoint, Boyd and Lew are ordered to drink by Garr, who intends to make their murders look accidental, but they get the upper hand on Garr and it is the mobster who is killed.

Boyd is able to persuade Paula to give their marriage another try. Lew is pleased for them, satisfied to be sober and working again.

== Cast ==
- James Cagney as Lew Marsh
- Gig Young as Boyd Copeland
- Phyllis Thaxter as Paula Arnold
- Raymond Massey as John Ives
- James Gleason as Charley Dolan
- Sheldon Leonard as Lennie Garr

== Reception ==
The film earned an estimated $1.9 million in US theatrical rentals in 1951.

== Awards and nominations ==
Award	Category	Nominee	Result	Ref.
Academy Awards	Best Supporting Actor	Gig Young	Nominated	
