= Time Express =

1979 American fantasy drama television series

- Cast photo
- Created by: Ivan Goff; Ben Roberts
- Starring: Vincent Price; Coral Browne; Woodrow Parfrey; William Phipps; James Reynolds
- Composer: Richard Hazard
- Country of origin: United States
- Original language: English
- No. of seasons: 1
- No. of episodes: 4

Production
- Executive producers: Ivan Goff; Ben Roberts
- Producer: Leonard B. Kaufman
- Running time: 60 minutes
- Production company: Warner Bros. Television

Original release
- Network: CBS
- Release: April 26 – May 17, 1979

Time Express is an American fantasy drama television series that aired on CBS from April 26 to May 17, 1979, and later syndicated. The series was created by Ivan Goff and Ben Roberts who had both previously been involved in the creation of Charlie's Angels and Mannix. The series ran for four episodes before being cancelled.

== Plot ==
The series is in anthology format, similar to other dramatic television series on American networks of the time such as The Love Boat, Fantasy Island, and to a lesser extent; NBC's Supertrain which premiered roughly two months earlier. Each episode consists of two tales featuring guest actors. The featured characters would receive an invitation from "The Head of The Line" to travel to some time and place in the past where a crucial point in their lives had occurred. They would arrive at Los Angeles Union Passenger Terminal and go to the "Special Services" desk, where the ticket clerk (Woodrow Parfrey) would direct them to "Gate Y, Track 13" (which was listed as "closed" on the public departure board).

On board the train (operated by Engineer Callahan (William Phipps) and conductor R. J. Walker (James Reynolds), who, in the initial episode were revealed to have been killed in a derailment on the "Allegheny Flyer" in 1886), they would be welcomed by hosts Jason and Margaret Winters (the husband and wife team of Vincent Price and Coral Browne) who would warn them of the risks of travelling to the past. On arrival, they would relive the period, potentially changing events, and then return by train to the present, where the implications of the changes would be revealed.

== Cast ==
- Vincent Price as Jason Winters
- Coral Browne as Margaret Winters
- James Reynolds as the conductor, R. J. Walker
- William Phipps as the engineer, Patrick Callahan
- Woodrow Parfrey as the ticket clerk

== Episodes ==
| No. | Title | Directed by | Written by | Original release date |
|---|---|---|---|---|
| 1 | "The Garbage Man / The Doctor's Wife" | Arnold Laven | Gerald Sanford | April 26, 1979 |
The Garbage Man: A businessman (Jerry Stiller) travels back to 1969 to return $2 million he discovered in the trash. The Doctor's Wife: A doctor (James MacArthur) travels back to 1967 to find his wife's long lost brother, who he needs to save her life.
| 2 | "The Figure Skater / The Copywriter's Romance" | Michael Caffey | Pat Fielder, Stephen Kandel, Richard Bluel | May 3, 1979 |
Two riders on the train get second chances at failed romances. Guest stars: Richard Masur and Terri Nunn
| 3 | "Rodeo / Cop" | Alan J. Levi | Alfred Hayes | May 10, 1979 |
The two featured characters revisit their untimely deaths relating to their careers. Guest stars: Robert Hooks and John Beck
| 4 | "Death / The Boxer" | Alan S. Levi | Ivan Goff, Ben Roberts | May 17, 1979 |
The first man revisits the fatal plane crash of his girlfriend and the second travels back to a rigged championship boxing match. Guest stars: Steve Kanaly, Linda Scruggs and Paul Sylvan
