= Midnight Lace =

1960 film by David Miller

- Theatrical release poster
- Directed by: David Miller
- Screenplay by: Ivan Goff; Ben Roberts
- Based on: Matilda Shouted Fire; 1958 play by Janet Green
- Produced by: Ross Hunter; Martin Melcher
- Starring: Doris Day; Rex Harrison; John Gavin; Myrna Loy; Roddy McDowall; Herbert Marshall; Natasha Parry; John Williams; Hermione Baddeley
- Cinematography: Russell Metty
- Edited by: Russell F. Schoengarth; Leon Barsha
- Music by: Frank Skinner
- Production company: Arwin Productions
- Distributed by: Universal Pictures
- Release date: October 13, 1960 (New York City)
- Running time: 108 minutes
- Country: United States
- Language: English
- Budget: $3.5 million
- Box office: $3.5 million

Midnight Lace is a 1960 American psychological horror thriller film directed by David Miller and starring Doris Day, Rex Harrison, John Gavin, Myrna Loy, and Roddy McDowall. The plot centers on a woman threatened by an anonymous stalker and who has a hard time convincing others of what is happening. The screenplay by Ivan Goff and Ben Roberts was based on the play Matilda Shouted Fire by Janet Green. The new title referred to the lacy item of clothing that Day's character purchases early in the film and wears at the climax.

The film was released theatrically in the fall of 1960. Day was nominated for the Golden Globe Award for Best Actress, and costume designer Irene Lentz earned an Academy Award nomination for Best Color Costume Design.

== Plot ==
American heiress Kit Preston and her British business owner husband Tony live in a wealthy neighborhood of London next to a building undergoing major renovation. Returning home in a dense fog through Grosvenor Square, Kit is startled by a disembodied male voice threatening to kill her.

When Kit returns to her apartment, she notices a gaunt man staring at her. Moments later, she is nearly injured by a falling girder outside the building, but is pushed out of harm's way by Brian Younger, a contractor working on the renovation. Later, Kit receives a menacing phone call from the same voice she heard in the park, again threatening to kill her. When neighbor Peggy observes Kit's anxiety, she phones Tony who brings Kit to file a report with Scotland Yard. Inspector Byrnes seems to dismiss the incident as Kit seeking attention from her husband.

Kit's aunt, Bea Coleman, arrives in London to visit her. Kit confides in Bea about the recent events and is comforted by her. Shortly after, Tony cancels the couple's planned trip to Venice due to a business obligation. Kit receives another threatening call. Tony attempts to listen in on from another phone, but Kit hangs up, unable to endure the caller's verbal abuse. The next day, Kit becomes trapped in the building's elevator due to a malfunction. A shadowy man approaches the elevator and enters the car through its roof, terrifying Kit, before it is revealed to be Brian, attempting to rescue her. Brian takes Kit to a local pub, where he recounts a near-death experience while he served in World War II.

Several days later, Kit attends a ballet with Tony and Bea, along with Malcolm, the son of Kit's maid Nora, and Charles Manning, the treasurer of Tony's company. During the ballet, Malcolm makes vague threats toward Kit, requesting additional money to help care for his mother. Kit demurs, insisting she will ensure Nora is cared for. Tony intervenes and accuses Malcolm of being responsible for the menacing phone calls Kit has received. During the ballet, Tony's assistant, Daniel Graham, notifies Tony that he has been looking at the books of the company, and it appears a large sum of money has been embezzled from their firm.

Over the ensuing days, Kit becomes increasingly paranoid. After receiving another call, Kit encounters the mysterious gaunt man in her apartment, and screams in horror. Brian hears her screams and rushes to her apartment, but no intruder is located when police arrive. The next day, Kit spots the gaunt man again on the street. She is pushed in front of a bus and is nearly killed. Kit begs Peggy to lie to Tony that she has heard the voice of Kit's stalker on the phone, hoping to legitimize her story so that police will take her claims seriously. Peggy complies, but is rebuffed when Tony informs her that the phone has been disconnected all day.

Tony and Bea become convinced Kit is delusional and send her to a psychiatrist. Tony finally agrees to embark on the trip to Venice. Before Tony leaves for a business meeting, the caller phones again. Tony has Byrnes surround the apartment building, hoping to catch the assailant, and pretends to leave. Meanwhile, Brian spots the gaunt man in a pub and follows him. In the darkened apartment, Kit is confronted by the gaunt man, but Tony attacks and incapacitates him. Kit assumes she is safe, only for Tony to reveal that he and Peggy conspired to torment Kit before killing her and staging her death as a suicide, with the motive of inheriting Kit's fortune to repay Tony's business debts. As Tony threatens to murder Kit, it is revealed that the intruder is in fact Peggy's estranged husband, who learned of her affair with Tony, and wants to kill her. Kit escapes the apartment by walking along the construction girders and scaffolding outside the balcony, just as Byrnes and Brian arrive. Brian helps Kit to safety, while Byrnes reveals he discovered Tony's guilt after tapping their phone.

== Cast ==
- Doris Day as Kit Preston
- Rex Harrison as Anthony "Tony" Preston
- John Gavin as Brian Younger
- Myrna Loy as Aunt Bea Vorman
- Roddy McDowall as Malcolm Stanley
- Herbert Marshall as Charles Manning
- Natasha Parry as Peggy Thompson
- Hermione Baddeley as Dora Hammer
- John Williams as Inspector Byrnes
- Richard Ney as Daniel Graham
- Anthony Dawson as Roy Ash
- Rhys Williams as Victor Elliott
- Richard Lupino as Foster
- Hayden Rorke as Doctor Garver
- Doris Lloyd as Nora Stanley, the housekeeper
- Elspeth March as woman
- Peter Adams as man at American Consulate
- Rex Evans as Basil Stafford
- Gage Clarke as salesman in gun shop (uncredited)

== Production ==
=== Development ===
The film was based on the play Matilda Shouted Fire by Janet Green. In August 1958, it was touring the provinces in Britain but had not arrived in London when Universal announced they had acquired the screen rights as a vehicle for Doris Day. In March 1959, Ben Roberts and Ivan Goff signed to write the script. The film would be done as a co-production between Universal and Arwin, the company of Day's husband.

In February 1960, the title was changed to Midnight Lace.

=== Casting ===
Producer Ross Hunter convinced Myrna Loy to come out of retirement to appear in the film.

=== Filming ===
Day found the making of the film emotionally taxing, and on one occasion collapsed on the set, resulting in producer Hunter temporarily halting the production.

== Release ==
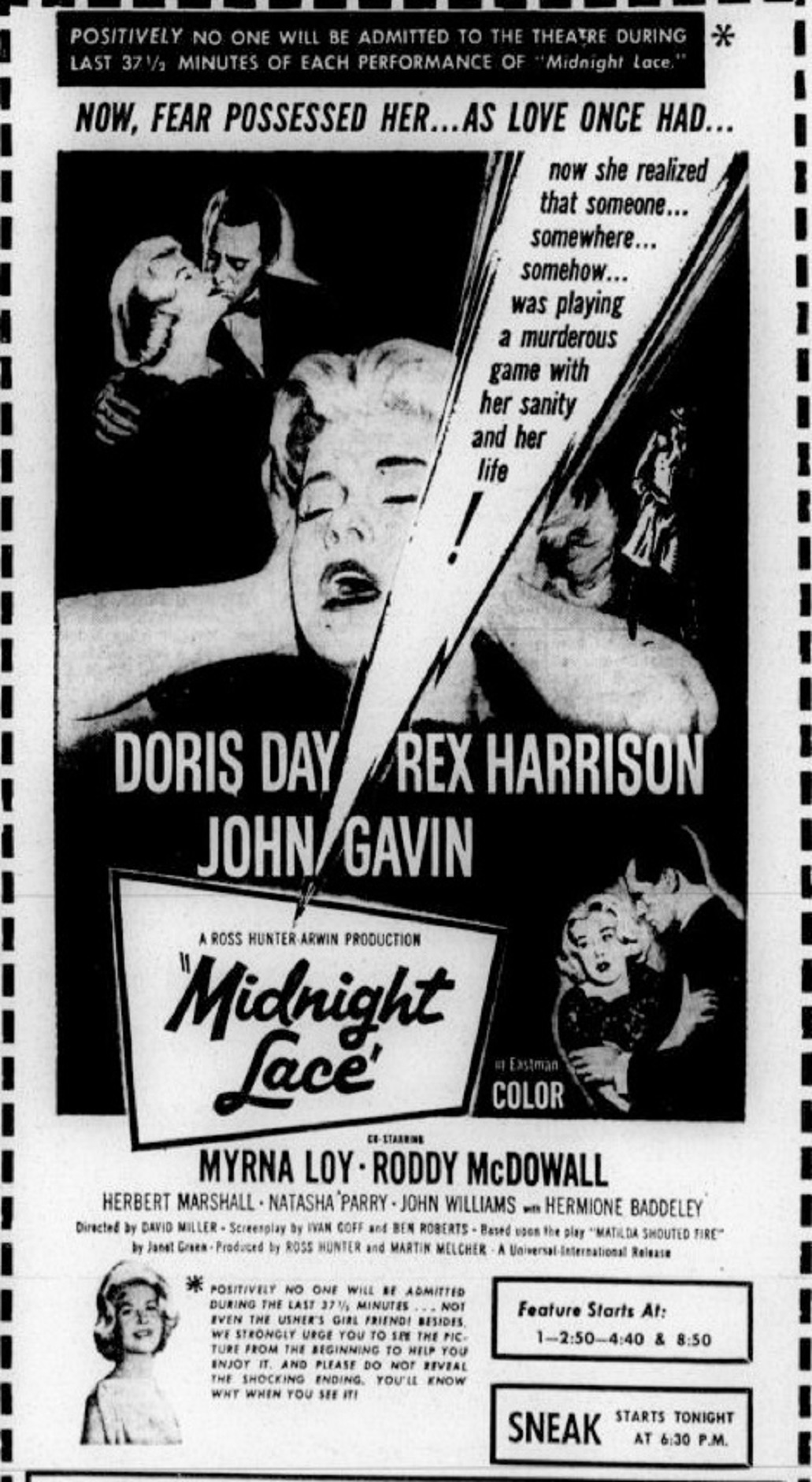
Advertisement from a Denton, Texas newspaper, 1960

Midnight Lace premiered in New York City on October 13, 1960.

=== Critical response ===
The Time critic described the film:

Another of those recurrent thrillers (Sorry, Wrong Number; Gaslight; The Two Mrs. Carrolls; Julie) in which a dear, sweet, innocent girl is pursued by a shadowy figure of evil who threatens her with all sorts of insidious molestation...Like its predecessors, Midnight Lace is not very interesting in itself, but it is uncomfortably fascinating when considered as one of the persistent fantasies of a monogamous society...False leads trail off in at least seven directions, but the climax of the film will come to most mystery buffs as no surprise...Doris Day wears a lot of expensive clothes, and in attempting to portray the all-American missus behaves like such a silly, spoiled, hysterical, middle-aged female that many customers may find themselves less in sympathy with her plight than with the villain's murderous intentions.

Variety wrote:

In a Ross Hunter effort the emphasis is on visual satisfaction. The idea seems to be to keep the screen attractively filled. First and foremost, it is mandatory to have a lovely and popular star of Doris Day's calibre. She is to be decked out in an elegant wardrobe and surrounded by expensive sets and tasteful furnishings. This is to be embellished by highly dramatic lighting effects and striking hues, principally in the warmer yellow-brown range of the spectrum. The camera is to be maneuvered, whenever possible, into striking, unusual positions...The effervescent Day sets some sort of record here for frightened gasps. Harrison is capable. Director David Miller adds a few pleasant little humorous touches and generally makes the most of an uninspired yarn.

=== Accolades ===
Doris Day was nominated for the Golden Globe Award for Best Actress - Motion Picture Drama. Irene Lentz was nominated for the Academy Award for Best Color Costume Design.

=== Home media ===
Universal first released Midnight Lace on VHS in 1987, through the MCA Home Video banner. In 2014, the film was released on DVD through the Turner Classic Movies Vault Collection with several bonus materials. The film was re-released on DVD in several editions by Turner in the following years, as well as by Universal as a stand-alone DVD and in the Doris Day: The Essential Collection, which features 5 other films starring Day (Pillow Talk, Lover Come Back, The Thrill of It All, Send Me No Flowers, and The Man Who Knew Too Much).

A Blu-ray edition was released on June 25, 2019, by Kino Lorber, featuring the film in two different widescreen ratios (2:1 and 1.78:1).

== See also ==
- List of American films of 1960
