= Virginia Kellogg =

American screenwriter

- Born: December 3, 1907; Los Angeles, California, USA
- Died: April 8, 1981 (aged 73); Los Angeles, California, USA
- Education: Los Angeles High School
- Occupation: Screenwriter
- Spouse(s): Walter Cochrane (1938–??); Thomas Milton Fine (1949–??); Frank Lloyd (1955–60); Albert Mortensen (1963–??)

Virginia Kellogg (December 3, 1907 – April 8, 1981) was an American film writer whose stories were adapted into the screenplays for White Heat (1949) and Caged (1950). Kellogg was nominated for the Academy Award for Best Story for White Heat (1949) at the 22nd Academy Awards held in 1950. She was nominated for Best Writing (Story and Screenplay) for Caged (1950) the following year.

== Biography ==
Virginia Kellogg was born in Los Angeles in 1907. Her parents were Walter Kellogg and Grace Irwin. She attended Los Angeles High School. Kellogg's first job was a reporter for The Los Angeles Times.

By 1930, she was working at Paramount as a scenarist, after starting out as a script girl and secretary for director Clarence Brown around 1926. She wrote a string of Pre-Code films for the studio at this time, including The Road to Reno and Mary Stevens, M.D. All the while, she'd continue writing radio plays and writing for national magazines.

In order to research Caged, the subject of which is women in prison, she became an inmate. With the assistance of authorities, she was incarcerated with a false conviction for embezzlement and served time in four American prisons.

She was married several times: to fellow Times reporter, Walter Cochrane in 1938 through the mid-1940s; to Thomas Milton Fine from 1949–unknown; to director Frank Lloyd from about 1955 to 1960; and Albert Mortensen, a retired railroad executive.

== Selected filmography ==
- Screaming Eagles (1956)
- Caged (1950)
- White Heat (1949)
- T-Men (1947)
- Stolen Holiday (1937)
- Mary Stevens, M.D. (1933)
- The Road to Reno (1931)
