= Man of a Thousand Faces (film) =

1957 film by Joseph Pevney

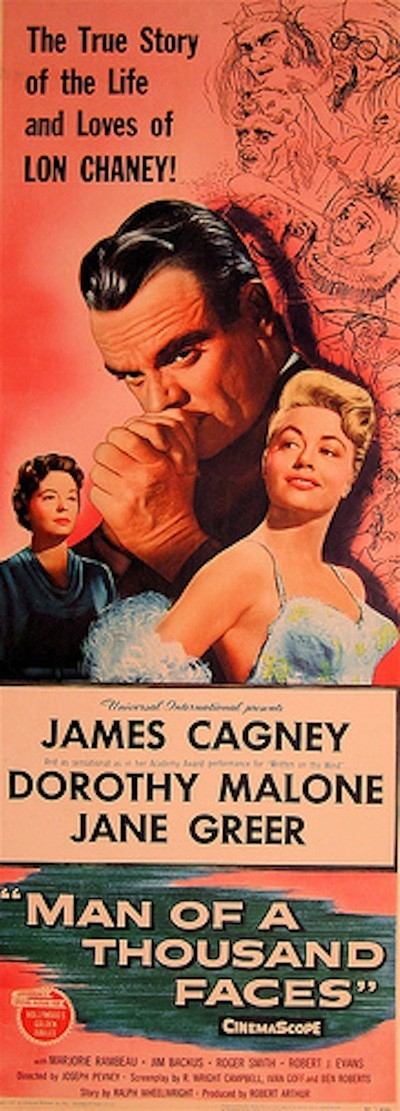
- Film poster by Reynold Brown
- Directed by: Joseph Pevney
- Screenplay by: R. Wright Campbell; Ivan Goff; Ben Roberts
- Story by: Ralph Wheelwright
- Produced by: Robert Arthur
- Starring: James Cagney; Dorothy Malone; Jane Greer; Marjorie Rambeau; Jim Backus; Roger Smith; Robert Evans
- Cinematography: Russell Metty
- Edited by: Ted Kent
- Music by: Frank Skinner
- Production company: Universal-International
- Distributed by: Universal-International
- Release date: August 13, 1957
- Running time: 122 minutes
- Country: United States
- Languages: English; American Sign Language
- Box office: $2.4 million (US)

Man of a Thousand Faces is a 1957 American dark dramatic film detailing the life of silent film actor Lon Chaney, played by James Cagney.

Directed by Joseph Pevney, the film's cast includes Cagney, Dorothy Malone, Jane Greer and Jim Backus. Chaney's son is played by Roger Smith, later the star of the television series 77 Sunset Strip, and Irving Thalberg is portrayed by Robert Evans, who soon left acting and eventually became the head of Paramount Pictures. The film's four writers were nominated for the Academy Award for Best Original Screenplay at the 30th Academy Awards.

== Plot ==
In the early 1900s, actor Lon Chaney is working in vaudeville with his wife Cleva. Lon quits the show and Cleva announces that she is pregnant. Lon is happy and tells Cleva that he has been hired by the famous comedy team of Kolb and Dill for an upcoming show.

When Cleva learns that Lon's parents are deaf, she fears that her unborn child will also be deaf. Months later, Cleva births a son named Creighton, who is not deaf. However, the Chaneys' marriage erodes over the next few years. Cleva takes a job as a singer in a nightclub.

Lon has developed a close friendship with chorus girl Hazel Hastings, who helps care for his baby. After Creighton becomes sick at the theater, Lon complains to Cleva's employer, who terminates her. When Cleva hears the news, she screams and Bill, a wealthy patron whom she has been dating, enters the dressing room. Lon tells Bill that he is there to collect his wife, causing Bill to look at Cleva with contempt as he walks away.

Lon returns to the theater, where he discovers Hazel being accosted in the corridor. Lon punches the attacker and sees that the man, who has two wooden legs, is Carl Hastings, Hazel's former husband, who is consumed with bitterness as the result of his accident.

Cleva enters the dressing room to find Lon with his hands on Hazel's shoulders, assuming that he is having an affair. She leaves home and vanishes. Days later, while Lon is performing, Cleva walks on stage in a deranged state and swallows a bottle of acid, permanently damaging her vocal cords. She is hospitalized but flees once again. The scandal destroys Lon's career in vaudeville.

The state takes custody of Creighton as they deem his home situation to be unsuitable, causing Lon to react angrily. On the advice of press agent Clarence Locan, Lon moves to Hollywood to appear in motion pictures. After starting as an extra, Lon becomes a successful bit player and later takes feature roles. Lon is cast in the silent film The Miracle Man (1919) and he becomes a star in such films as The Hunchback of Notre Dame (1923) and The Phantom of the Opera (1925).

As his career soars, Lon faces personal challenges. Although he marries Hazel and regains custody of Creighton, Cleva reappears, seeking to spend time with her son. Creighton, who had been told that his mother was dead, leaves to stay with Cleva, angry with Lon about the deception.

Lon becomes ill on the set of The Unholy Three (1930) and is diagnosed with bronchial cancer. Creighton reconciles with his father and they take a fishing trip to Lon's cabin. Soon after, Lon collapses and is returned home to live his final days.

On his deathbed, Lon, unable to speak, uses signs to express his love for his friends and family and to ask for forgiveness. With a stick of greasepaint, he adds "Jr." to his own name on his makeup box, indicating his wish that his son should follow in his footsteps. Creighton leaves with the box, ready to begin his film career as Lon Chaney Jr.

== Cast ==
- James Cagney as Lon Chaney
- Dorothy Malone as Cleva
- Jane Greer as Hazel
- Marjorie Rambeau as Gert
- Jim Backus as Clarence
- Robert Evans as Irving Thalberg
- Celia Lovsky as Mrs. Chaney
- Jeanne Cagney as Carrie Chaney
- Roger Smith as Creighton Chaney as an adult
- Robert Lyden as Creighton Chaney at 13
- Rickie Sorensen as Creighton Chaney at 8
- Dennis Rush as Creighton Chaney at 4
- Simon Scott as Carl Hastings
- Jack Albertson as Dr. J. Wilson Shields
- Nolan Leary as Pa Chaney
- Clarence Kolb as himself
- Danny Beck as Max Dill
- Philip Van Zandt as George Loane Tucker
- Hank Mann as Comedy Waiter
- Snub Pollard as Comedy Waiter
- Billy Curtis as Harry Earles (uncredited)
- Forrest Taylor as Miracle Man (uncredited)
- Jerry Hartleben as Lon Chaney as boy

== Historical accuracy ==
Creative license was employed in the writing of the screenplay, and many incidents were sanitized and fictionalized. Lon Chaney had stated in interviews at the time that he did not want Creighton (later Lon Chaney Jr.) to become an actor as is depicted in the film's conclusion. At the time of his father's death, Creighton Chaney worked at a water-heater company. When the company failed, he began to accept film work and was billed under his birth name. It was only in the mid-1930s that he allowed himself (at the insistence of film producers) to be billed as Lon Chaney Jr., but he was ashamed of the name.

In the film, Chaney dies at home while with family and friends, but in reality, Chaney died in his hospital room after a throat hemorrhage.

The depiction of Chaney's makeup for The Phantom of the Opera and The Hunchback of Notre Dame differs significantly from his original makeup for the films. Cagney's face appears partially immobile behind an elaborate full latex mask and other makeup, but Chaney took great pride in his ability to distort his appearance using minimal makeup, which still allowed for a great deal of facial expression.

== Reception ==
In a contemporary review for The New York Times, critic Bosley Crowther described the scenes depicting the early days at Universal Pictures as "immensely flavorsome and exciting" and strongly praised James Cagney's performance:

With not too much help from the screenplay, Mr. Cagney none the less gives a stirring sense of the actor's devotion to his first wife, to his infant son, to his aging parents and to his profession, which he pursues through a hard career in vaudeville to eventual stardom in Hollywood. Being Mr. Cagney, it is difficult for him to remove all the familiar Cagney cockiness and pugnacity from the role. Even so, there is an abundance of tenderness, sensitivity and pride in his creation of the driven actor. This is the heart of the film. ... Joseph Pevney's direction has a curious affection for clichés, but Mr. Cagney rises above it. He etches a personality.

At review-aggregation site Rotten Tomatoes, the film has an aggregate score of 80% based on ten critical reviews, eight positive and two negative.

== See also ==
- List of films featuring the deaf and hard of hearing
