= White Heat =

1949 American film noir by Raoul Walsh

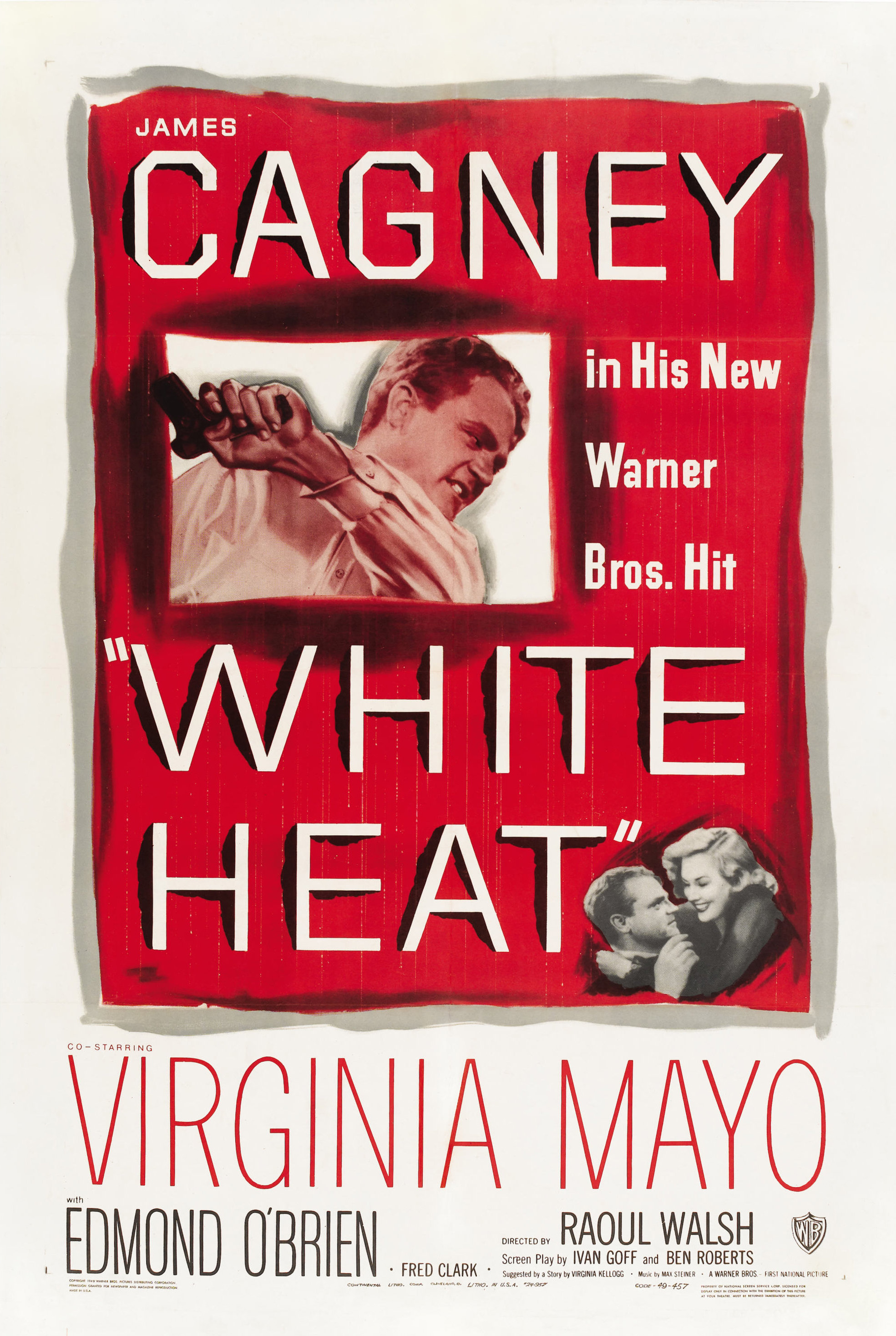
- Theatrical release poster
- Directed by: Raoul Walsh
- Screenplay by: Ivan Goff; Ben Roberts
- Based on: White Heat by Virginia Kellogg
- Produced by: Louis F. Edelman
- Starring: James Cagney; Virginia Mayo; Edmond O'Brien; Fred Clark
- Cinematography: Sidney Hickox
- Edited by: Owen Marks
- Music by: Max Steiner
- Distributed by: Warner Bros. Pictures
- Release dates: August 25, 1949 (Miami); September 2, 1949 (New York City)
- Running time: 114 minutes
- Country: United States
- Language: English
- Budget: $1 million or $1.3 million
- Box office: $1.9 million or $3.483 million

White Heat is a 1949 American film noir, directed by Raoul Walsh. Its screenplay, written by Ivan Goff and Ben Roberts, is based on a story by Virginia Kellogg. The film stars James Cagney, Virginia Mayo, and Edmond O'Brien.

White Heat is considered to be one of the best gangster films of all time. In 2003, White Heat was selected for preservation in the National Film Registry as being "culturally, historically, or aesthetically significant" by the United States Library of Congress.

== Plot ==
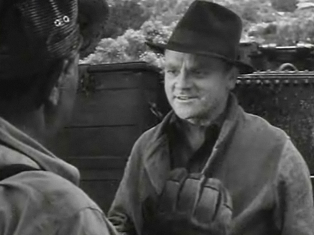
James Cagney in the film's opening robbery scene

In California, psychotic criminal Arthur "Cody" Jarrett leads the ruthless Jarrett gang alongside his wife Verna, his beloved mother "Ma" Jarrett, and his right-hand man "Big Ed" Somers. During a robbery of a mail train in the Sierra Nevada mountains, the gang kills four train crewmen, but a gangster is severely scalded by steam. While on the lam, Cody has a severe migraine, through which Ma nurses him; afterward, Ma and Cody have a quick drink and make a toast, "Top of the world!", before rejoining the others. The gang splits up, leaving the scalded gangster to die in their hideout. His body is soon discovered, alerting the police.

Using informants, the police track Cody, Verna, and Ma to a motel in Los Angeles. U.S. Treasury investigator Philip Evans tries to apprehend Cody, who shoots him and flees with Verna and Ma. He then puts his emergency scheme in motion: confess to a lesser crime committed by an associate in Springfield, Illinois at the same time as the train job—a federal crime—thus providing him with a false alibi and assuring him a lesser sentence. He turns himself in and is sentenced to one to three years in state prison. Suspicious, Evans plants undercover agent Hank Fallon (as "Vic Pardo") in Cody's cell. His task is to find "the Trader," a fence who launders stolen money for Cody.

On the outside, Big Ed takes charge of the gang, aided by Verna. Ed pays inmate Roy Parker to kill Cody. In the prison workshop, Parker attempts to drop a heavy piece of machinery on Cody, but Hank pushes Cody out of the way, saving his life and gaining Cody's trust. Ma visits and vows to "take care of" Big Ed, despite Cody's frantic attempts to dissuade her. He starts worrying and decides to break out with Hank. Meanwhile, Verna murders Ma, whom she mutually despises, which Big Ed uses as blackmail to ensure Verna's loyalty to him. When Cody learns of Ma's death from a new inmate, he goes berserk in the mess hall before deciding to escape.

In the infirmary, Cody is diagnosed with "homicidal psychosis" and recommended for transfer to an asylum. When asylum staff arrive to take him, another inmate sneaks Cody a gun, which he uses to take hostages and escape alongside Hank, Parker, and their fellow inmates. News of the escape reaches Ed and Verna, who anxiously await his return. Verna tries slipping away, but Cody arrives and catches her; she convinces Cody that Big Ed killed Ma, prompting Cody to kill him.

With Cody leading again, the gang welcomes Hank and the escapees, and alongside "the Trader", revealed to be Daniel Winston, begins planning their next heist: stealing a Long Beach chemical plant's payroll using an empty tank truck as a Trojan horse to dodge security. As the gang prepares, Hank discreetly installs the signal transmitter on Verna's radio beneath the truck, and writes a message to Evans on a service station's washroom mirror alerting him to the robbery and the radio signal.

The gang gets into the plant office, but Evans and the LAPD track the truck using direction finders and surround the office; meanwhile, the truck driver, ex-con "Bo" Creel, recognizes Hank and alerts Cody. Enraged, Cody opts to fight and prepares to execute Hank, but Hank escapes after the police fire tear gas into the office. In the ensuing firefight, the police kill most of Cody's gang and Verna is arrested, while Cody retreats to a field of Horton spheres and kills his last remaining gangster when he tries to surrender. Cornered after ascending a tank, Cody is fatally shot by Hank using a rifle, but he fires at the tank, igniting it. As the police take cover, Cody shouts, "Made it, Ma! Top of the world!", before the tank explodes.

== Cast ==
- James Cagney as Arthur "Cody" Jarrett
- Virginia Mayo as Verna Jarrett
- Edmond O'Brien as Hank Fallon, alias Vic Pardo
- Margaret Wycherly as "Ma" Jarrett
- Steve Cochran as "Big Ed" Somers
- John Archer as Philip Evans
- Wally Cassell as Giovanni "Cotton" Valletti
- Fred Clark as Daniel "The Trader" Winston

=== Unbilled ===
- Ford Rainey as Zuckie Hommell
- Fred Coby as Happy Taylor
- G. Pat Collins as the reader
- Robert Osterloh as Tommy Ryley
- Paul Guilfoyle as Roy Parker
- Ian MacDonald as Bo Creel
- Mickey Knox as Het Kohler
- Ray Montgomery as Trent
- Leo Cleary as the fireman
- Terry O'Sullivan as the radio announcer

== Production ==
=== Development ===
I used to like to walk out on him, frankly, whenever my contract didn't suit me. I'd cuss him out in Yiddish, which I had learned from Jewish friends in my days at Stuyvesant High School. Drove him wild. "What'd he say?!" he'd yell. "What'd he just call me?!"

— Cagney on his relationship with Jack L. Warner, Rolling Stone (1982).

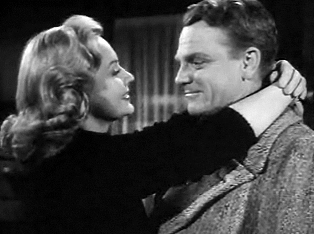
Virginia Mayo and James Cagney

After winning an Oscar for Yankee Doodle Dandy, Cagney left Warner Bros. Pictures in 1942 to form his own production company with his business manager and brother, William. After making four unsuccessful movies (including the well-regarded, but "financially disastrous" adaptation of William Saroyan's The Time of Your Life), Cagney returned to Warner Bros. in mid-1949. His decision to return was purely financial; Cagney admitted he "needed the money", and that he never forgot the "hell" Warner put him through in the 1930s when it came to renewing his contract. Likewise, the last thing Jack Warner wanted to see was Cagney back on his lot; referring to him as "that little bastard", he vowed to never take him back. Cagney's new contract with Warner enabled him to make $250,000 per film on a schedule of one film per year, plus script approval and the opportunity to develop projects for his own company.

To make good on his comeback, Cagney settled on the script for White Heat; on May 6, 1949, he signed on to portray Arthur "Cody" Jarrett. Much to Jack Warner's dismay, writers Ivan Goff and Ben Roberts suggested him for the lead, claiming, "there's only one man who can play [Jarrett] and make the rafters rock." For years, Cagney resisted gangster roles in an effort to avoid typecasting, but decided to return to the genre after feeling his box-office power waning. Following Cagney's attachment, Warner Bros. increased the production budget to $1 million and hired Raoul Walsh to direct. Walsh had previously worked with Cagney on The Roaring Twenties (in 1939) and The Strawberry Blonde (in 1941). However, Cagney was unhappy with the studio's decision to hire Walsh, in part, because he requested Frank McHugh be in the film, but Walsh turned his friend down in an attempt to cut costs.

=== Writing ===
Warner Bros. bought the rights to the story from Virginia Kellogg for $2,000. Being "methodical craftsmen", it took Goff and Roberts six months to complete the first draft. They "would plot in complete detail before even beginning to write, then write their dialogue together, line by line." When Walsh saw it, he pleaded with Cagney's brother, William, to talk Cagney out of doing the picture. According to him, the draft was "bad—a real potboiler", but William reassured Walsh that "Jimmy [would] rewrite it as much as possible."

White Heat was meant to be based on the true story of Ma Barker, a bank robber who raised her four sons as criminals, but this was changed along with Cagney's involvement; Ma Barker became Ma Jarrett, and her four children were reduced to two. Arthur Barker became Arthur "Cody" Jarrett, a psychopath with a mother fixation. Cody's mental illness and the exact cause of his migraines remain a mystery throughout the film, though Philip Evans states in one scene that his father died in a mental institution. This was done intentionally, enabling viewers to use their imaginations and draw their own conclusions. The script received several rewrites, with input being given from some of Cagney's closest friends. Humphrey Bogart and Frank McHugh worked "after hours" on revisions, with McHugh writing the film's opening scene.

The script is notable for reworking many themes from Cagney's previous films with Warner Bros. Most notably, in The Public Enemy, Cagney smashed a grapefruit into Mae Clarke's face; in White Heat he kicks Virginia Mayo off a chair. In Each Dawn I Die, his character suffers the ill effects of prison; while here, his character has a breakdown in the prison mess hall. Furthermore, in The Roaring Twenties, Cagney fought with rival gangsters in a similar fashion to how Cody Jarrett stalks the double-crossing "Big Ed" Somers (portrayed by Steve Cochran).

=== Filming ===
The prison mess hall scene involving 600 extras was shot in under three hours.

The production began on May 5, 1949, and lasted six weeks until completion on June 20. Walsh made use of a number of locations in Southern California, first by going to the Santa Susana Mountains (near his home) to shoot "chase scenes". He then moved on to an old Southern Pacific tunnel near Chatsworth to stage the opening robbery scenes. Urban street scenes along with the "Milbank Hotel" were shot in and around Van Nuys. The "hideaway lodge sequences" were shot at the Warner movie ranch, the interior scenes in the studio itself, and the climax scene at an oil refinery near Torrance, south of Los Angeles. The drive-in theater scenes were shot at the now-demolished San Val Drive-In in Burbank.

Jack Warner wanted the prison mess hall scene replaced for budgetary reasons, stating the "cost of a single scene with 600 extras and only one line of dialogue would be exorbitant." For this reason, Warner wanted the scene shot in a chapel, but relented when "the writers pointed out that, apart from the fact that Jarrett would never be [willingly] caught in a chapel", the whole point of the scene was to "have a lot of noise, with rattling knives and forks and chatter, that suddenly goes completely silent when Jarrett first screams." The scream was improvised by Cagney, and the shock on everyone's face was real, for neither Cagney nor Walsh informed any of the extras of what was going to happen. Warner agreed to the scene on the condition that it be shot in three hours, so "that the extras were through by lunchtime."

A number of scenes were improvised; Walsh's "personal touches go beyond the script." When Cody and his gang hide out in their cabin just after the train heist, Cody has one of his "debilitating headaches", causing him to fall from his chair and fire off a round from his .45. This was Walsh's idea, as was the showing of Virginia Mayo's upper thigh on screen. Another scene involved Cody giving his wife, Verna, a "seething look", but Walsh improvised and had Cagney knock her off of her chair. Cagney claimed it was his idea "to have Cody climb onto Ma Jarrett's lap and sit there, being soothed during one of his psychotic [episodes]", but Walsh has always denied this, claiming many years later that it was his idea.

== Reception ==
Advertisement for a screening of the film at the Colonial Theater in Allentown, Pennsylvania, showcasing Cagney's performance.

=== Box office ===
According to Warner Bros. records, the film earned $2,189,000 domestically and $1,294,000 overseas.

=== Critical response ===
Critical reaction to the film was positive, and today it is considered a classic. Bosley Crowther of The New York Times called it "the acme of the gangster-prison film" and praised its "thermal intensity".

This classic film anticipated the heist films of the early '50s (for example John Huston's 1950 The Asphalt Jungle and Stanley Kubrick's 1956 The Killing), accentuated the semidocumentary style of films of the period (the 1948 The Naked City), and contained film-noirish elements, including the shady black-and-white cinematography, the femme fatale character, and the twisted psyche of the criminal gangster.

— Tim Dirks

In 2005, White Heat was listed in Time's top 100 films of all time. On review aggregation website Rotten Tomatoes, White Heat currently holds an approval rating of 94% based on 80 reviews, with a weighted average of 8.50/10. The site's consensus reads: "Raoul Walsh's crime drama goes further into the psychology of a gangster than most fear to tread, and James Cagney's portrayal of the tragic antihero is constantly volatile". At Metacritic, which assigns a normalized rating to reviews, the film received a score of 89 out of 100, based on 21 reviews, indicating "universal acclaim".

== Awards and nominations ==
In 1950, Virginia Kellogg was nominated for the Academy Award for Best Story. Also that year, writers Ivan Goff and Ben Roberts were nominated for the Edgar Award for Best Motion Picture, by the Mystery Writers of America. In 2003, the United States Library of Congress selected White Heat for preservation in the National Film Registry.

On June 4, 2003, the American Film Institute named Cody Jarrett in its list of the best heroes and villains of the past 100 years, he was voted 26th. Furthermore, in June 2005, "Made it, Ma! Top of the World!" was voted 18th in AFI's 100 Years...100 Movie Quotes; while, in June 2008, White Heat was voted fourth in AFI's 10 Top 10 list of gangster movies.

== Legacy ==
Scenes of the film are featured in the 1992 crime-drama film Juice, as well as the 1982 Hart to Hart episode "Hart and Sole". In the noir parody Dead Men Don't Wear Plaid, Steve Martin acts in scenes with Cagney's character through special effects and cross-cutting.

The "Made it ma! Top of the world" line is used in the 1991 film Ricochet, in which Denzel Washington recites the quote in the final scene atop a tower. A variation of the quote—"Top of the world, ma!"—appears in the 1986 movie Tough Guys during a scene in which Eli Wallach shoots at cops from a train; the same variation is used in the 1990 film The Adventures of Ford Fairlane by Andrew Dice Clay. when he escapes kidnappers and discovers that he is atop the Capitol Records Building. Fade to Black (1980 film) features a character who becomes obsessed with Cagney's Cody Jarrett, and recreates White Heat's iconic finale. It has also been quoted in a fifth-season episode of Cheers, a second-season episode of Breaking Bad. and the series finale of Mixels. The line is also quoted in the Kings of the Sun song "Drop the Gun".

The film has inspired songs such as Madonna's "White Heat" on True Blue; the song was also dedicated to Cagney. Sam Baker's "White Heat" references the plot and dialogue on his 2013 album Say Grace.

The "Made it Ma! Top of the World" line also was used in the opening of 50 Cent and PnB Rock's "Crazy" song.
