= Ben Roberts (screenwriter) =

American screenwriter (1916–1984)

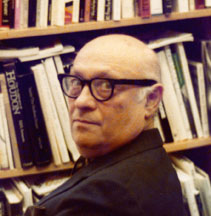
- Roberts in 1980
- Born: March 23, 1916; New York City, U.S.
- Died: May 12, 1984 (aged 68); Los Angeles, California, U.S.
- Resting place: Westwood Village Memorial Park Cemetery
- Occupations: Screenwriter, producer
- Years active: 1942–1984

Benjamin Eisenberg Roberts (March 23, 1916 – May 12, 1984) was an American film and television writer, producer and one of the creators of the Charlie's Angels and Time Express television series. In 1958, he was nominated for an Academy Award for writing the Lon Chaney biopic Man of a Thousand Faces. He has also been nominated for two Emmy awards and an Edgar Award. In 1972, Roberts won a Golden Globe Award for Best Television series, drama for Mannix.

Roberts entered New York University at age 16, graduating three years later. By the time he was 22, Roberts was successfully running his own independent public-relations counseling firm and was contributing comedy material to several Broadway musicals. In 1941, he collaborated with another young writer, Ivan Goff, on the theatrical suspense thriller Portrait in Black. He briefly worked in films in the early 1940s, returned to the stage for six years, then settled in Hollywood permanently in 1949. All of his subsequent film efforts, as both screenwriter and producer, were in collaboration with his old friend Goff. The pair contributed to the success of such varied projects as White Heat (1949), Captain Horatio Hornblower (1951), Shake Hands with the Devil (1959) and Midnight Lace (1960); and in 1957, they shared an Academy Award nomination for their scriptwork on Man of a Thousand Faces (1957). Roberts and Ivan Goff were also executive producers for the weekly television series Mannix and Nero Wolfe.
