= List of people from Scranton, Pennsylvania =

This is a list of people from Scranton, Pennsylvania

== Arts and entertainment ==
- J. Grubb Alexander, silent film screenwriter
- Pete Barbutti, actor
- Thomas Cynfelyn Benjamin, Welsh-language poet and congregational minister
- Walter Bobbie theatre director and choreographer
- Alan Brown, filmmaker
- Sonny Burke, big band leader
- Stephen Cognetti, film writer and director
- Mark Cohen, photographer
- Karl R. Coolidge, screenwriter
- Ann Crowley, singer and actress
- Pat Crowley, Actress
- Emile de Antonio, documentary film director and producer
- Carrie De Mar, actress, singer, and vaudevillian
- Dorothy Dietrich, stage magician, escapologist, co-owner of Houdini Museum
- Margot Douaihy, writer and author
- Robert Eibach, American Grammy Award winning artist, producer, recording engineer
- Cy Endfield, screenwriter, film and theater director, author, magician, and inventor
- Ann Evers, film actress
- Leonard R. Garner Jr., tv director and actor
- Joe Gill, comic book writer and artist
- Wanda Hawley, silent film actress
- Lee Bennett Hopkins, educator, poet, and author
- Allan Jones, singer and actor
- Gloria Jean, singer and actress
- Stephen Karam, playwright and screenwriter
- JP Karliak, actor, voice actor, and comedian
- Barrie Karp, artist, scholar, and academic
- Jean Kerr, author and playwright
- Michael Patrick King, television and film writer, director and producer, co-creator of 2 Broke Girls and The Comeback
- William Kotzwinkle, novelist and screenwriter
- Michael Kuchwara, theater critic, columnist, and journalist
- Gershon Legman, cultural critic and folklorist
- Harry M. Leonard, film sound mixer
- Bradford Louryk, theater artist and actor
- Charles Emmett Mack, actor
- Jeanne Madden, singer, star of musical theater and 1930s films
- Judy McGrath, MTV Networks CEO
- Charles MacArthur, playwright and screenwriter
- The Menzingers, punk band
- W. S. Merwin, 17th U.S. Poet Laureate
- Jason Miller, actor, director, and Pulitzer Prize–winning playwright of That Championship Season
- Russ Morgan, big band-era bandleader
- Alice Cordelia Morse, American designer of book covers, educator
- Motionless in White, gothic metalcore band
- Bruce Mozert, photographer
- Jerry Orbach, American actor and singer
- Jerry Penacoli, actor and director
- Byrne Piven, stage actor
- Cynthia Rothrock, martial artist and star of martial arts films
- Lizabeth Scott, actress and singer
- Katy Selverstone, actress, Lisa Robbins on The Drew Carey Show
- Melanie Smith, television actress
- Mabel Cox Surdam, photographer
- Thomas L. Thomas, concert singer
- Tigers Jaw, indie rock, emo band
- Beverly Tyler, actress and singer
- Ned Washington, Academy Award-winning lyricist
- Lauren Weisberger, author, The Devil Wears Prada
- Wicca Phase Springs Eternal, singer
- Tyra Vaughn, actress and dancer

== Business, industry and labor ==
- John J. Albright, American businessman and philathorpist
- Louise Tanner Brown, African American businesswoman and owner of a trucking company
- Lisa Caputo, Citigroup group
- Frank J. Coyne, American business executive, former CEO of Verisk Analytics
- Alex Grass, founder of Rite Aid
- Ralph Lomma, popularized miniature golf
- John Mitchell, labor organizer, founding member and president, United Mine Workers of America
- Paul Montrone, American business executive, former chairman and CEO of Fisher Scientific
- Terence V. Powderly, former head of Knights of Labor
- William Henry Richmond, coal mine operator
- Sally Victor, milliner
- Charles Sumner "Sum" Woolworth, retailer, philanthropist, co-founder of Woolworth
- Mel Ziegler, co-founder, The Republic of Tea and Banana Republic

== Government and politics ==
- Richard J. Beamish, Pennsylvania Secretary of the Commonwealth and commissioner, Public Utilities Commission
- Bruce Beemer, Inspector General of Pennsylvania (2016), Pennsylvania Attorney General (2016–2017)
- Joe Biden, 46th President of the United States (2021–2025), 47th Vice President of the United States (2009–2017), U.S. senator from Delaware (1973–2009)
- John Blake, former Pennsylvania State Senator
- Patrick J. Boland, former U.S. congressman
- Marion Cowan Burrows, former Massachusetts state legislator
- John D. Butzner Jr., former United States federal judge - United States Court of Appeals for the Fourth Circuit
- Frank Carlucci, former U.S. Secretary of Defense and ambassador to Portugal
- Robert P. Casey, former governor of Pennsylvania
- Bob Casey Jr., U.S. senator for Pennsylvania
- Gaynor Cawley, former Pennsylvania State Representative
- Jim Connors, former mayor of Scranton
- John Cusick, retired lieutenant general and 42nd Quartermaster General of the United States Army
- David J. Davis, former Pennsylvania lieutenant governor
- Mike Dunleavy, governor of Alaska
- Hermann Eilts, former U.S. ambassador to Saudi Arabia, Egypt, and Bangladesh
- John R. Farr, U.S. Congressman
- Anne Healey, Maryland House of Delegates
- Kathleen Kane, former Pennsylvania attorney general and felon
- Yechiel Leiter, Israeli ambassador to the United States since 2025
- Malachy E. Mannion, United States District Judge, United States District Court, Middle District of Pennsylvania
- Joseph M. McDade, Former United States Congressman
- Julia K. Munley, United States District Judge for the Middle District of Pennsylvania
- Karen Murphy, former Secretary of Health of Pennsylvania, Pennsylvania Director of the State Innovation Models Initiative, and CEO of the Moses Taylor Health System
- Ernie Preate, former Pennsylvania attorney general and felon
- Robert Reich, former U.S. Secretary of Labor, professor and political commentator
- Hugh E. Rodham, father of Hillary Clinton
- Loretta Rush, chief justice of the Indiana Supreme Court
- Mary Scranton, former First Lady of Pennsylvania
- George W. Scranton, American industrialist and U.S. congressman
- Joseph A. Scranton, U.S. congressman
- Marion Margery Scranton, Suffragette and vice-chair, U.S. Republican Party
- William Scranton, former governor of Pennsylvania and U.S. ambassador to the United Nations
- William Scranton III, former Pennsylvania lieutenant governor
- Harvey Sicherman, Special Assistant to the then Secretary of State, Alexander Haig, American writer and foreign policy expert, President of the Foreign Policy Research Institute from 1993 to 2010
- Joel Wachs, Los Angeles city council member
- Laurence Hawley Watres. U.S. Congressman
- Louis A. Watres, Pennsylvania lieutenant governor
- James Donald Walsh, Diplomat and foreign service officer, United States Ambassador to Argentina 2000-2003
- Stephen Wojdak, American politician, member of the Pennsylvania House of Representatives (1969–1976)

== Military ==
- John Cusick, retired lieutenant general and 42nd Quartermaster General of the United States Army
- John L. Gronski, U.S. Army major general
- Thomas W. Hoffman, American Civil War soldier and Medal of Honor recipient
- Gino J. Merli, Medal of Honor recipient during World War II
- Paul W. Richards, NASA astronaut and engineer
- Robert Sables, American naval historian and Lt. Colonel in the U.S. Army Reserve
- Martin F. Scanlon, U.S. Air Force general
- John Anthony Walker, former U.S. Navy chief warrant officer convicted of spying for the Soviet Union

== Sports ==
- Hank Bullough, NFL player and coach
- P. J. Carlesimo, college, Olympic, and professional basketball coach and television broadcaster
- Jimmy Caras, professional pool player
- Nick Chickillo, former NFL player
- Nestor Chylak, Baseball Hall of Famer and former American League umpire
- Joe Collins, Major League Baseball player, six-time World Series champion
- Patty Costello, professional bowler, International Bowling Congress Hall of Fame, and Pro Bowlers Tour Hall of Fame member
- Jim Crowley, football player and coach, one-fourth of University of Notre Dame's legendary "Four Horsemen" backfield
- Lenny Dykstra, Major League Baseball player
- Edmund Eiden, former NFL player
- Bill Ferrario, former NFL player
- Paul Foytack, Major League Baseball pitcher
- Charlie Gelbert, Major League Baseball player
- Joe Grzenda, Major League Baseball player
- John Halstead, Olympian
- Cosmo Iacavazzi, college and AFL player
- Edgar Jones, college and professional football player
- Jerome Kapp, NFL wide receiver
- Gary Lavelle, Major League Baseball player
- Bill Lazor, NFL offensive coordinator
- Dave Lettieri, Olympic cyclist
- Mike Lynn, general manager and executive Minnesota Vikings
- Hoddy Mahon (1932–2011), high school and collegiate basketball coach who was the head coach of the Seton Hall Pirates
- Joe McCarthy, Major League Baseball player
- Jake McCarthy, Major League Baseball player
- Matt McGloin, former NFL quarterback
- Gerry McNamara, former basketball player and current head coach of the Syracuse Orange men's basketball team
- Mike McNally, former Major League Baseball player, member of New York Yankees' first World Series championship team
- Mike Minor, World Champion snowboarder and a Paralympian
- Mike Munchak, former head coach of NFL's Tennessee Titans, college and NFL player, member of Pro Football Hall of Fame
- Joe O'Malley, football player
- Jim O'Neill, Major League Baseball player
- Steve O'Neill, former Major League Baseball player and manager
- Jackie Paterson, Scottish boxer
- Abby Peck, Olympic Rower
- Jimmy Piersall, Major League Baseball player and Scranton Miners Minor League Baseball player
- Ivan Puskovitch, Olympic swimmer
- Jim Rempe, pocket billiards champion and member of the Billiard Congress of America Hall of Fame
- Adam Rippon, figure skater
- Tim Ruddy, college and National Football League player
- Dutch Savage, professional wrestler
- Jack Scott, sports and political activist, sports writer
- Greg Sherman, general manager of NHL's Colorado Avalanche
- Chick Shorten, Major League Baseball player
- Marc Spindler, college and NFL player
- Brian Stann, mixed martial artist, UFC analyst for Fox Sports, former WEC Light Heavyweight champion
- Jim Williams, world-record-holding powerlifter

== Religious leaders ==
- Joseph Bambera, Bishop of Scranton
- Robert C. Morlino, Bishop of Madison, Wisconsin
- Patrick O'Boyle, Archbishop of the Archdiocese of Washington (1948–1973)
- John Joseph O'Connor, former bishop of Roman Catholic Archdiocese of New York and Bishop of Scranton
- James Timlin, Former Bishop of the Scranton Diocese,1984-2003, and Auxiliary Bishop 1976-1984
- Clarence C. Walton, First lay President of Catholic University of America (1969–1978)

== Journalists and activists ==
- Drew Von Bergen, journalist (United Press International), President of the National Press Club (1980) and the National Cherry Blossom Festival (1995–1997)
- John Harold Brislin, Pulitzer Prize winning journalist
- William G. Connolly, Journalist and newspaper editor
- Susan E. Dickinson, American journalist
- Frank Gibney, journalist and scholar
- Jane Jacobs, writer and activist
- Jeffrey Bruce Klein, investigative journalist, co-founded Mother Jones magazine
- John Oliver La Gorce, writer and explorer
- Carl Marzani, political activist, volunteer soldier in Spanish Civil War, organizer for the Communist Party USA, U.S. intelligence official, documentary filmmaker, author, and publisher
- Albert Jay Nock, Author, editor, and social critic

== Scientists and Academics ==
- Howard Gardner, developmental psychologist and Harvard Professor
- Isaiah Fawkes Everhart, American physician, naturalist, and founder of Everhart Museum
- Charles David Keeling, environmental scientist at the Scripps Institution of Oceanography
- Edwin W. Kemmerer, economist and professor at Princeton University
- Daniel Mazia, cell biologist and professor at UC-Berkeley
- Francis T. McAndrew, Social Psychologist, Professor at Knox College (Illinois), & Science Writer
- Jay Parini, writer and professor at Middlebury College
- B. F. Skinner, Pioneering Behaviorist, Harvard Professor, and author

== Others ==
- Mamie Cadden, Irish midwife and abortionist
- Hugh Glass, American frontiersman
- Lansing C. Holden, architect
- Karen Ann Quinlan, key figure in right to die controversy
