= Chickillo =

Chickillo is a surname. Notable people with the surname include:

- Anthony Chickillo (born 1992), American football player, son of Tony and grandson of Nick
- Nick Chickillo (1930–2000), American football player
- Tony Chickillo (born 1960), American football player
