= Goodlander =

Goodlander is a surname. Notable people with the surname include:

- C. W. Goodlander (1834–1902), American architect, builder, businessman, banker, hotelier, and author
- Maggie Goodlander (1986-), American politician
- Maybelle Goodlander (1882–1959), American commercial and portrait photographer
