= Pearl Grace Loehr =

American photographer and arts educator

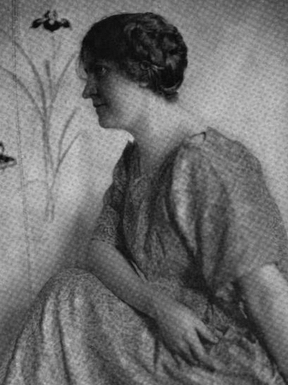
Pearl Grace Loehr, from a 1914 publication.

Pearl Grace Loehr (born September 29, 1882) was an American photographer and arts educator based in New York. Born in Warsaw, Indiana, the daughter of Mrs. Elizabeth Loehr, she was interested in art from the time she was a child. She apprenticed with a local artist, who encouraged her to attend art school in Indianapolis, and she then moved to New York to study at the Pratt Institute in Brooklyn. She soon opened her own studio in Brooklyn, and became known as an expert on photographing children and the home. In 1913, she was elected president of the Women's Federation of the Photographers Association of America, and served one term. After that, she continued to give lectures, speaking at conventions and conferences. She also taught classes on photography in New York. On June 12, 1916, she married Chester Irvin Wagner, an inventor and businessman, who had three children from a previous marriage. In newspapers of her day, she continued to use her maiden name, and was still working at photography till at least 1919. She and her husband were living in East Orange, NJ when Chester died in 1942; Pearl died in 1944.

== Career ==
Loehr had a portrait studio in New York, but specialized in "home portraiture". "She catches them just at the moment when they are most essentially themselves," explained one 1916 profile about her portraits of children, adding "Old Age is equally considered and its peculiar features brought out to perfection". She gave a talk on "Home Portraiture" at the 1912 meeting of the Photographers Association of America in Philadelphia. "It is almost a fatal mistake to have a grown person in the room outside of one's self. The grown person has a tendency to fuss over the child and generally makes it nervous," she noted of her own technique. "Every child has a distinct personality and unless one gets that, what is the use?"

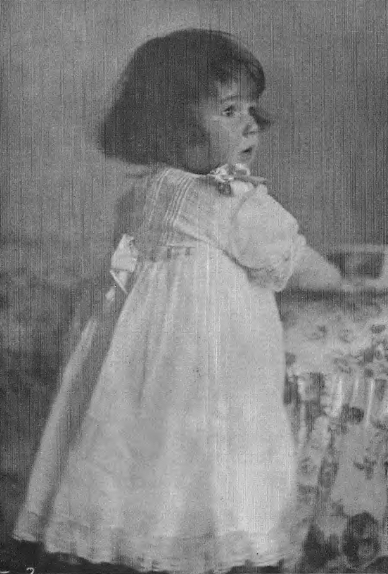
An example of a child portrait by Pearl Grace Loehr, from a 1916 publication.

Loehr served as president of the Women's Federation of the Photographers Association of America in 1913-1914, working with Mary Carnell, Bayard Wootten, Maybelle Goodlander, Clara Louise Hagins, and Blanche Reineke in the Federation's leadership.

Loehr was appointed to head the new Photographic Department at the New York School of Fine and Applied Arts in 1915. Also in 1915, Loehr made a set of portraits of author and feminist Charlotte Perkins Gilman.
