= Gene Veno =

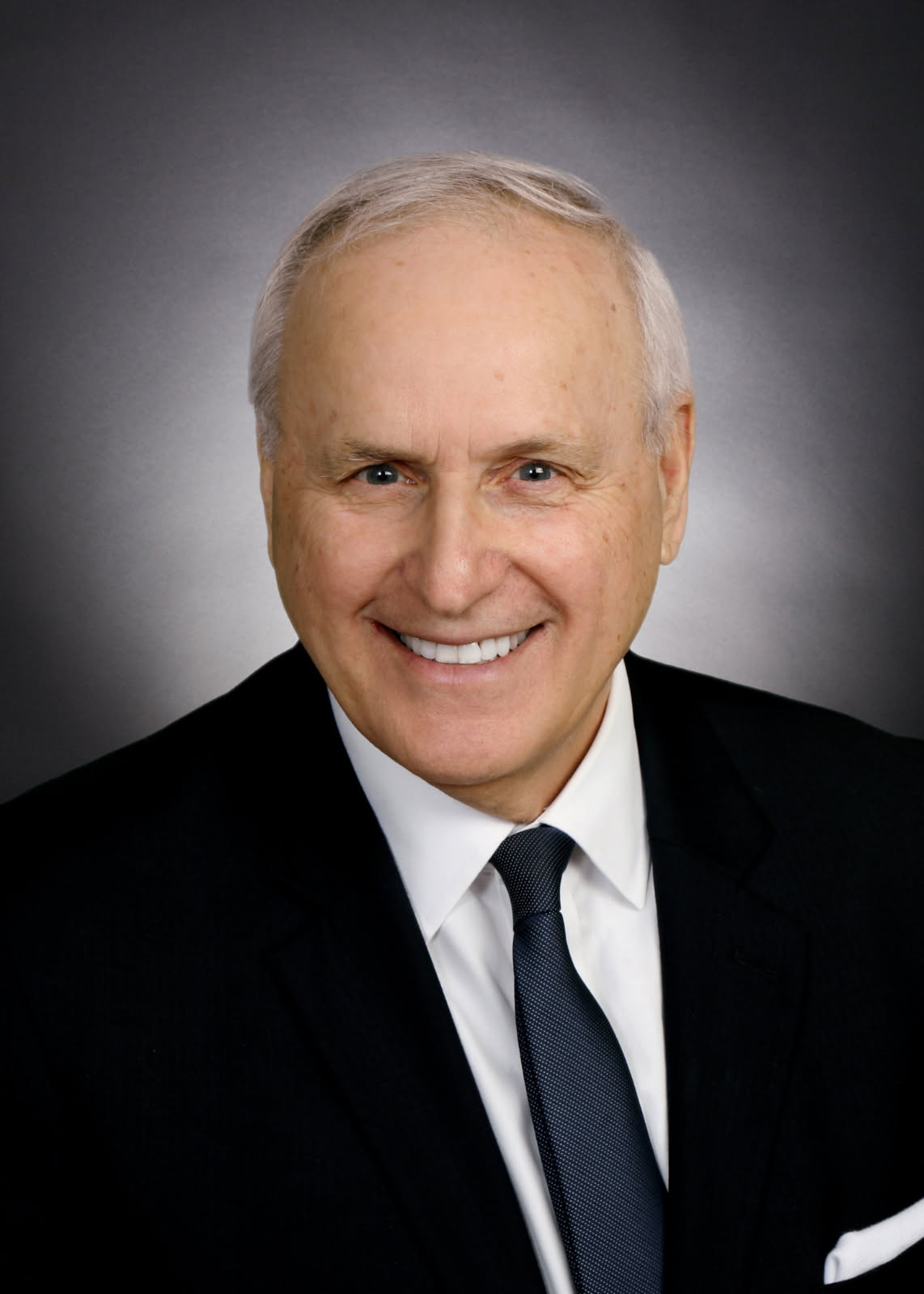

Gene G. Veno Director of Governmental Affairs and Public Advocacy at Susquehanna River Basin Commission. Served as CEO for both Non Profit ~ Non Partisan & Corporate Organizations: was appointed Chief Recovery Officer for Harrisburg School District. He was president and CEO of the American Association of Public Insurance Adjusters (AAPIA), and founder of Veno & Associates.

== Education ==
Gene attended West Scranton High School. Upon graduating he received his BS in Business Education from Elizabethtown College. Gene earned his master's degree in Public Administration from Marywood University and Gene received an honorary Doctorate Degree in Law from the National University of Health Sciences.

== Career ==
In 1975, Gene was elected chairman of the Lackawanna County Home Rule Government Study Commission. Gene ran for Mayor of Scranton, Pennsylvania in 1981, but lost to James Barrett McNulty by 575 votes. In 1984, Gene served as executive secretary to the Pennsylvania Milk Marketing Board. In 1989, Gene founded Veno and Associates, a governmental policy and lobbying firm, in Harrisburg, Pennsylvania. In June 2005, he was named president and CEO of the Foundation for Chiropractic Progress. Gene was the President/CEO for the American Association of Public Insurance Adjusters and was a state-appointed chief recovery officer for Harrisburg School District. He has also served on the school board for the Scranton School District and was an adjunct graduate and undergraduate instructor of business at the Lebanon Valley College as well as Dean of Continuing Education at Lackawanna College.

== Chief Recovery Officer for Harrisburg School District ==
Gene Veno was named chief recovery officer for Harrisburg City School District on December 13, 2012. On May 18, 2013, the Harrisburg Board of School Directors voted in favor of Veno's plan 9–0. On May 31, 2013, Veno's recovery plan was approved by the state of Pennsylvania. The plan consists of a call to cut costs by 5% for both staff salary and benefits. After the implementation of Gene's financial plan, Standard & Poor's Rating Services gave the Harrisburg School District an "A" rating.

== Books ==
In 2011, Gene served as creator for Safety In The Field For Public Adjusters, a book written by Mark A. Everest, Lori E. Everest, and Leah A. Class.

He later authored two e-books: Navigating the Corridors of Power: Building Lasting Success in Governmental Affairs (2025), which discusses principles of leadership and public service based on his experiences in government relations, and The Quiet Architects of My Life: A Tribute to Those Who Shaped Me – A Journey of Gratitude Across Seven Decades (2025), a reflective work honoring the mentors and personal influences throughout his life.

== Awards and honors ==
In 2002, Gene was awarded the Nevelyn J. Knisley Award for College Educator of the Year for developing a strategic marketing plan for the Lebanon Catholic High School. In 2005, he was named Person of the Year by Dynamic Chiropractic. In 2008, Gene received an honorary Doctorate Degree in Law from the National University of Health Sciences.
