= Veno =

Veno may refer to:

== People ==
=== Given name ===
- Veno Belk (born 1963), American football player
- Veno Pilon (1896–1970), Slovene painter, graphic artist and photographer
- Veno Taufer (born 1933–2023), Slovenian poet, essayist, translator and playwright

=== Surname ===
- Gene Veno, American politician
- William Henry Veno (1866–1933), British chemist

== Places ==
- Venø, Denmark
