= Surdam =

Surdam is a surname. Notable people with the surname include:

- Mabel Cox Surdam (1879–after 1940), American portrait photographer
- R. G. Surdam (1835–1891), American businessman, real estate agent, and developer
