= Chorus line =

Group of dancers who perform synchronized routines

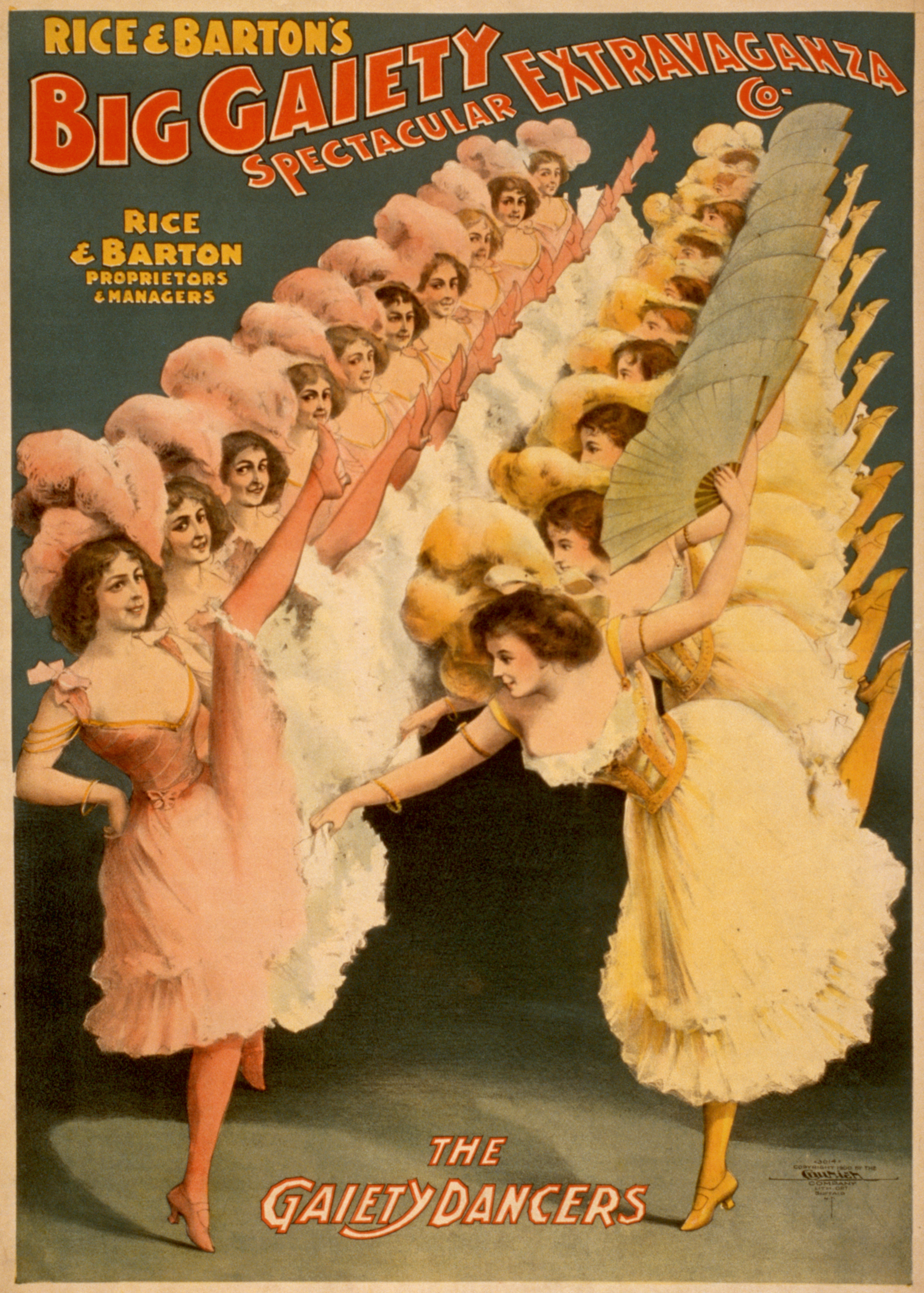
Theatrical poster from 1900 showing an early chorus line.

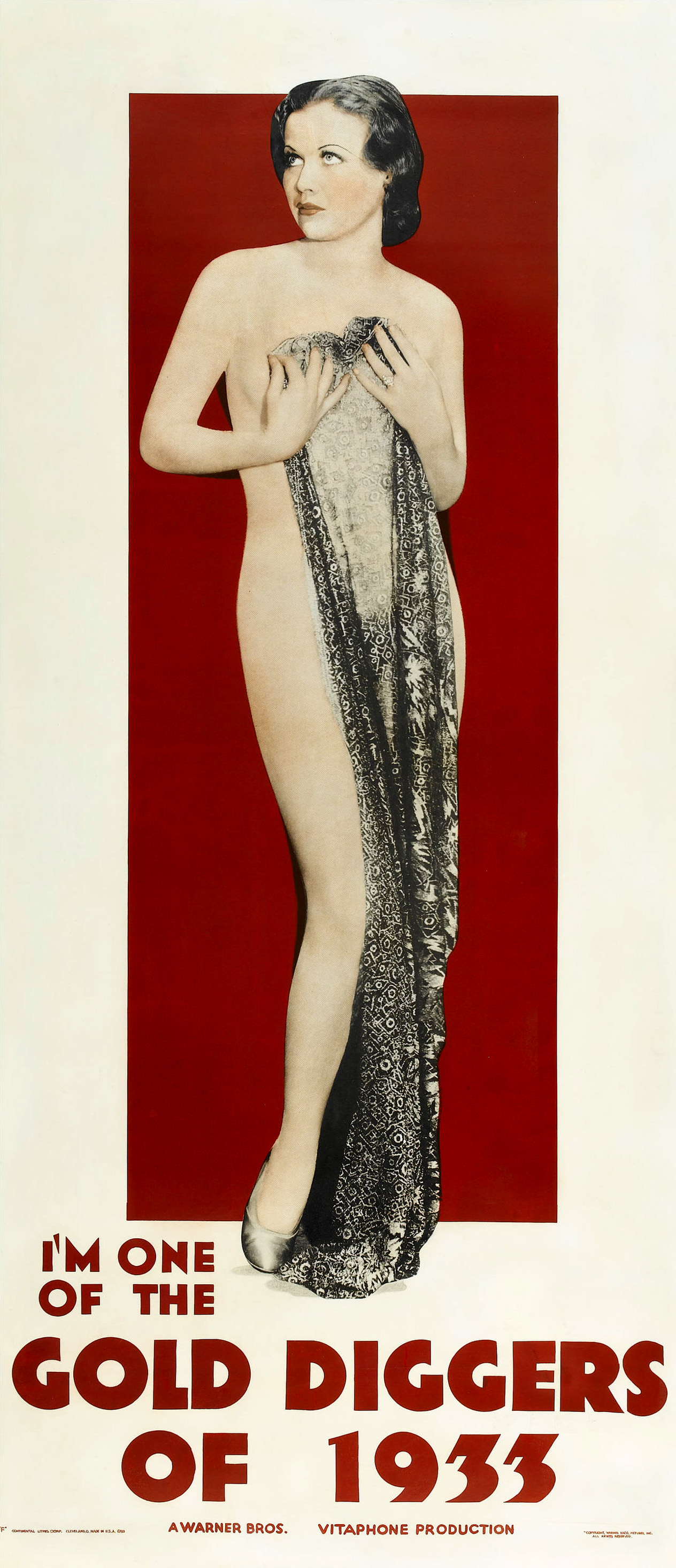
One of the 200 chorus girls appearing in the American film Gold Diggers of 1933.

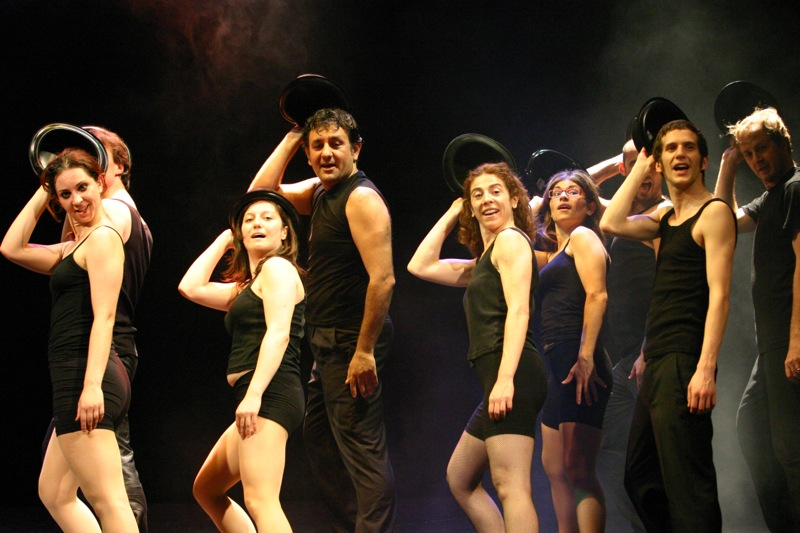
A modern chorus line.

A chorus line is a large group of dancers who together perform synchronized routines, usually in musical theatre. Sometimes, singing is also performed. While synchronized dancing indicative of a chorus line was vogue during the first half of the 20th century, modern theatre uses the terms "ensemble" and "chorus" to indicate all supporting players in a stage production.

== History ==
In the mid-1800s, chorus lines of cartwheeling, synchronized dancing can-can "girls" began sprouting up throughout Paris with even edgier, more erotic cabarets found in venues like the Moulin Rouge, Le Lido, and the Folies Bergẻre. By the late 1860s, the scandalous trend found its way to the United States with a more conservative trend of chorus lines hitting England, including Tiller Girls and Gaiety Girls. Chorus lines throughout Western Europe and the United States largely owned the stages of the early twentieth century. Chorus line dancers in early Broadway musicals and revues were referred to by slang terms such as ponies, gypsies and twirlies.

Chorus lines hit vogue in the 1920s and 30s, as the life and possibilities of a "chorus girl" became sensationalized in fiction, newspapers, and film, capturing the imaginations of young women seeking independence, adventure, and a happily ever after. Real-life examples of the Cinderella narrative included Lilian Russel and Billie Dove, both of whom began their careers as chorus girls and married into wealth.

The chorus line was a common place of entry for women hoping to make a career out of performing. Some women, who started successful careers in the performing arts as chorus girls include Paulette Goddard, Barbara Stanwyck, and Betty Grable.

One of the most popular productions of the time was the Ziegfeld Follies, operating out of New York City, which was well-known for hiring only the most striking women for the chorus line. Florenz Ziegfeld Jr received the reputation of being able to objectively define and select exceptionally beautiful women. Ziegfeld's standards, then, soon became the ideal, and publications and news articles circulated with headlines like, "How I pick my Beauties" and "Picking out pretty girls for the stage".

Decades later, chorus lines of a more erotic flavor found huge success in Las Vegas, before declining again in the face of competition from burlesque and strip clubs.

Some popular chorus lines found their way onto the golden screen. One group in particular was Samuel Goldwyn's dancers, the Goldwyn Girls. Popping up in numerous MGM productions, the famous Goldwyn Girls included stars who went on to find great success on-screen like Lucille Ball, Virginia Mayo, and Jane Wyman.

To this day, some live performance venues keep the traditional chorus line alive with groups like The Rockettes, but more frequently the term "chorus line" in modern terms is used to differentiate supporting singers and dancers of any gender in a musical or musical revue from the lead actors or performers.

== Famous chorus lines ==
- Gaiety Girls (started in England during the 1890s)
- Tiller Girls (international act starting in the 1890s)
- Ziegfeld girls
- The Rockettes (U.S. act founded in 1925)

== Famous performers ==
Performers who started out dancing in traditional chorus lines include:

- Louise Alexander
- June Allyson
- Carroll Baker
- Josephine Baker
- Lucille Ball
- Betty Boothroyd
- Anise Boyer
- Louise Brooks
- Virginia Bruce
- June Clyde
- Joan Crawford
- Marion Davies
- Yvonne De Carlo
- Myrna Dell
- Marlene Dietrich
- Alice Faye
- Paulette Goddard
- Betty Grable
- Lena Horne
- Adele Jergens
- Dorothy Jordan
- Ruby Keeler
- Phyllis Kennedy
- Dorothy Lamour
- Ruta Lee
- Myrna Loy
- Jeanette MacDonald
- Dorothy Mackaill
- Jessie Matthews
- Virginia Mayo
- Eve Miller
- Juanita Moore
- Nita Naldi
- Evelyn Nesbit
- Sheree North
- Joan Shawlee
- Jean Rhys
- Barbara Stanwyck
- Tyra Vaughn
- Toby Wing
- Jane Wyman

== See also ==
- Can-can
- Friedrichstadt-Palast
- Showgirl
- Corps de ballet
