= Scranton High School (Pennsylvania) =

Coordinates: 41.4181°N 75.6689°W

Location
- 63 Mike Munchak Way; Scranton, Pennsylvania 18508; United States

Information
- School type: Public high school
- Motto: Campus of Champions
- School district: Scranton School District
- Principal: Claire Brier
- Teaching staff: 93.70 (FTE)
- Grades: 9–12
- Enrollment: 1,819 (2023–2024)
- Student to teacher ratio: 19.41
- Language: English
- Campus type: Urban
- Colors: Cardinal red and Vegas Gold
- Mascot: Knight
- Information: 570-348-3481
- Website: Official website

Scranton High School is an urban high school located in Lackawanna County, Pennsylvania in Northeastern Pennsylvania. It is part of the Scranton School District. It enrolled 1,792 ninth through twelfth grade students in 2010. It is accredited by the Middle States Association of Colleges and Secondary Schools.

The school offers honors and advanced classes for motivated students. Regular classes are aimed at a wide range of students with different academic abilities. The school provides ESL (English as a Second Language) and development courses for students.

The school is designated as a Title I school wide institution. The student population was Caucasian - 1,190, Hispanic - 263, African American - 184, Asian/Pacific Islander - 100 and Native American - 1. The student body included 857 females and 881 males in 2010.

== History ==
Scranton High School opened its doors on the corner of Vine Street and Washington Avenue. The original building was renamed Scranton Central High School following the opening of Scranton Technical High School and the W.T. Smith Manual Training School. In 1990, Scranton Technical High School became Scranton High School. The following year, Central closed, and its students were sent to the former Technical and West Scranton High School. In 1992/93, the Technical mascot of the Red Raiders was dropped, and the Knight became the team mascot. In 2001, a new high school building opened adjacent to Memorial Stadium, and the former Technical building became Northeast Scranton Intermediate School. Its principals have been Albert T. Karam (August 1991 – June 2002), Robert McTiernan (August 2002 – October 2006), Bryan McGraw (November 2006 – November 2009), Eric Schaeffer (December 2009 – May 2012), and John Coyle (July 2012 – present).

== Building ==
Scranton High School is an example of modern architecture with an interesting design. Most of the classrooms are in one of three wings, and the gyms and pool are on the opposite end of the building. The school was the recipient of a Golden Trowel Award for an educational building in 2002. The area is also recognized for its mentions in the hit TV show, The Office.

== Academics ==
The school is organized into the following academic units/departments:

- Business
- English
- Fine Arts
- Foreign Languages
- Health/Physical Education
- Home Economics
- Industrial Arts
- Mathematics
- Science
- Social Studies

Requirements for graduation include four years of math, English, social studies, and physical education; three years of science; two years of health, one year of driver safety, and four elective credits. Students are also required to complete a graduation project. This consists of an extensive paper on a subject of their choosing. The students must then present this project to members of the faculty. If this project is not completed, the student will not be allowed to graduate. Students must also pass the Pennsylvania System of School Assessment (PSSAs) in reading, writing, science, and mathematics with a level of at least "proficient" to graduate.

=== AP ===
The school offers Advanced Placement (AP) classes in the following classes:

- Chemistry
- Biology
- Calculus AB
- English Literature and Composition
- U.S. History
- European History
- Physics B
- Computer Science A
- Environmental Science
- Government and Politics

== Scholastic competition ==
In the 2005–2006 school year, the school competed in both the Scholastic Bowl and the televised Scholastic Scrimmage, sponsored by the U.S. Army. Both competitions involved a team of five students competing against other local schools. Scranton High placed 4th out of 27 schools in the Scholastic Bowl, and won the initial Scholastic Scrimmage. This victory won the school four thousand dollars.

In the 2006–2007 school year, Scranton High School won both the Scholastic Bowl and the Scholastic Scrimmage.

In the 2007–2008 school year, Scranton High School placed second in the Scholastic Scrimmage. The victory won the school two thousand dollars.

== Extracurriculars ==
Scranton School District offers a variety of clubs, activities and sports.

=== Clubs ===
- Advanced Chorus
- Anime Club
- Art Club
- Computer Club
- Drama Club
- FBLA - Future Business Leaders of America
- Film Club
- French Club
- Latin Club
- Library Club
- Marching Band
- Mock Trial
- Orchestra
- Penn Serve Club
- Political Science Club
- SADD - Students Against Destructive Decisions
- SHS Tech Club
- Spanish Club
- Speech and Debate
- Spirit Club
- TATU - Teens Against Tobacco Use
- Yearbook Club

=== Sports ===
The school's official mascot is a knight, and the school's sports teams are called the Scranton Knights. The school colors come from a combination of the gold from the Scranton Central High School Golden Eagles and red from the Scranton Technical High School Red Raiders, the school's which preceded Scranton High School. The school actively participates in the following sports:

- Boys' freshman football
- Boys JV football
- Boys baseball
- Varsity cross country (boys' and girls')
- Cheerleading
- Coed varsity golf
- Girls' softball
- Ice hockey (The school district gave partial support for a team two years only, 2005 and 2006.)
- Soccer (boys' and girls')
- Swimming (boys' and girls')
- Tennis (boys' and girls')
- Varsity football
- Wrestling

The school's varsity football team plays the West Scranton High School Invaders in the yearly "Bell Game," usually in early October. The winning team takes a large bell to remain at their school until the following meeting.

The school occasionally offers intramural sports and events such as volleyball tournaments.

Stephen Karam, Pulitzer Prize nominated and Tony award-winning playwright

== Notable alumni ==
- Cy Endfield, screenwriter
- Eugene A. Garvey, former Bishop of Altoona
- Jane Jacobs, urban planning activist and author
- Stephen Karam, playwright and 2016 Tony Award winner
- Bill Lazor, offensive coaching assistant, Houston Texans
- Gershon Legman, author and folklorist
- Karoline Mehalchick, lawyer
- Joe McCarthy, professional baseball player for the San Francisco Giants
- Jean Marlowe, professional baseball player
- Judy McGrath, former chief executive officer, MTV
- Mike Munchak, professional football player, coach
- Joe O'Malley, football player (Scranton Technical)
- Jake McCarthy, professional baseball player
