= Mabel Cox Surdam =

American portrait photographer (1879 – c. 1940)

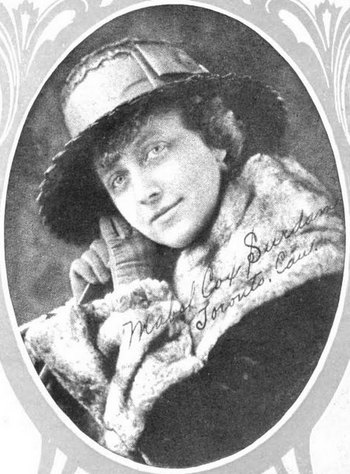
- Mabel Cox Surdam, from a 1919 publication
- Born: Mabel E. Cox; October 23, 1879; Scranton, Pennsylvania
- Died: after 1940
- Occupation: portrait photographer
- Spouse: Sherman Evarts Surdam

Mabel Cox Surdam (born October 23, 1879 – died after 1940) was an American portrait photographer based at various times in Binghamton, New York, Toronto, Ontario and Pittsburgh, Pennsylvania.

== Early life ==
Mabel E. Cox was from Scranton, Pennsylvania, the daughter of David Austin Cox and Lettie Austin Rome Cox. Her father worked for the railroad.

== Career ==
In 1910, Mabel Cox Surdam hosted a meeting of the Photographers' Association of Binghamton, in her home in that city. She worked as a receptionist and portrait photographer in Toronto, for the T. Eaton Company. After eight years in Toronto, she worked at the Breckon studio in Pittsburgh, beginning in 1921, and was active in that city's photography groups too. She spoke at a meeting of the Professional Photographers Society of New York in 1918, and the Professional Photographers of Pennsylvania in 1923.

In 1911 and 1912, Surdam was elected second vice-president of the Women's Federation of the Photographers' Association of America, in the Federation's leadership with Maybelle Goodlander and Pearl Grace Loehr. She had seven works in a traveling exhibit organized by the Photographers' Association of America in 1916. She spoke to the convention on the topic "Personality in Business" in 1919. 1922 she was named third vice-president of the Association. "There is never a convention at which she is not present, either as a speaker or spectator," noted one profile of Surdam in 1919.

== Personal life ==
Mabel Cox married fellow photographer Sherman Evarts Surdam in 1898. Her husband was head of the photographic department at General Electric, taught photography at Rensselaer Polytechnic Institute, and was president of the Professional Photographers Society of New York in 1940-1941.
