= Goldwyn Girls =

1930s–1950s American company of female dancers

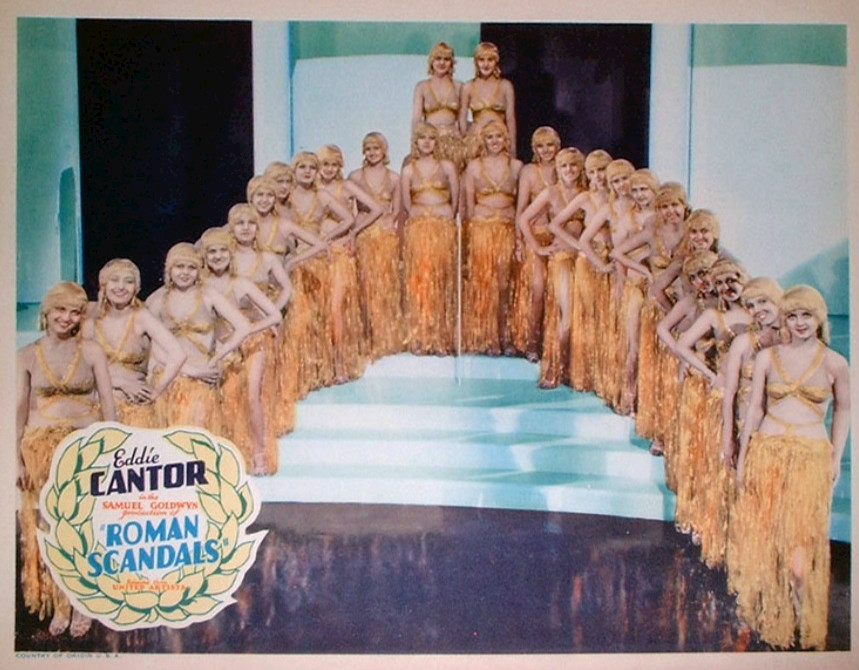
The Goldwyn Girls in Roman Scandals

The Goldwyn Girls were a musical stock company of female dancers employed by Samuel Goldwyn. Famous actresses, dancers, and models whose career included a stint in the Goldwyn Girls include Lucille Ball, Virginia Bruce, Claire Dodd, Paulette Goddard, Betty Grable, Virginia Grey, June Kirby, Joi Lansing, Barbara Pepper, Marjorie Reynolds, Pat Sheehan, Gail Sheridan, Ann Sothern, Larri Thomas, Tyra Vaughn, Toby Wing, Vonne Lester, and Jane Wyman.

== History ==
Samuel Goldwyn modeled his silver screen Goldwyn Girls after the stage sensation Ziegfeld Follies around 1929 when Ziegfeld came west to Hollywood to assist in the film production of his popular musical Whoopee!. Goldwyn learned much from Florenz Ziegfeld on creating an enchanting chorus line, which Ziegfeld called one of his secrets of success: "Women enjoyed looking at beautiful women in beautiful clothes, the glorification of their gender". To this standard, Goldwyn added his own guidelines, explaining to the press that a Goldwyn Girl must meet his standards of beauty, personality, talent, self-confidence, and ambition. He is quoted as requiring one more ethereal trait as well, "I have always insisted that every Goldwyn Girl look as though she had just stepped out of a bathtub. There must be a kind of a radiant scrubbed cleanliness about them which rules out all artificiality."

One use for the chorus line, the Goldwyn Girls, was to open Goldwyn's Cantor productions. The pictures, built on a stock formula, would inevitably open with a big production number of the Goldwyn Girls, then move to a blackface number, and end for the characters. Two such productions were Whoopee! and Palmy Days.

In 1955, MGM Studios produced a film rendition of the popular Broadway musical Guys and Dolls, with a new line of Goldwyn Girls cast as the Hotbox Dancers, supporting Vivian Blaine as Miss Adelaide, who originated the role on Broadway. The Goldwyn Girls then went on a world tour, which further promoted the film, and the film became an international hit, "rivaling MGM's overseas records set by Gone With the Wind".

== Partial filmography ==
- 1930: Whoopee!
- 1931: Palmy Days
- 1931: Kiki
- 1932: The Kid from Spain
- 1933: Roman Scandals
- 1934: Kid Millions
- 1936: Strike Me Pink
- 1938: The Goldwyn Follies
- 1944: Up in Arms
- 1944: The Princess and the Pirate
- 1945: Wonder Man
- 1946: The Kid from Brooklyn
- 1947: The Secret Life of Walter Mitty
- 1955: Guys and Dolls, as the Hot Box Girls
