= Down to Earth (1947 film) =

1947 film by Alexander Hall

- Theatrical release poster
- Directed by: Alexander Hall
- Screenplay by: Edwin Blum; Don Hartman
- Based on: Characters from It Was Like That (1938 play) by Harry Segall
- Produced by: Don Hartman
- Starring: Rita Hayworth; Larry Parks; Marc Platt; Roland Culver; James Gleason; Edward Everett Horton; Adele Jergens; George Macready; William Frawley
- Cinematography: Rudolph Maté
- Edited by: Viola Lawrence
- Music by: Songs: Allan Roberts; Doris Fisher; Greek ballet: Mario Castelnuovo-Tedesco
- Production company: Columbia Pictures
- Distributed by: Columbia Pictures
- Release date: August 21, 1947
- Running time: 101 minutes
- Country: United States
- Language: English
- Box office: $2.5 million (US rentals)

Down to Earth is a 1947 American musical romantic comedy film directed by Alexander Hall and starring Rita Hayworth and Larry Parks. It is a sequel to the 1941 film Here Comes Mr. Jordan, also directed by Hall. While Edward Everett Horton and James Gleason reprised their roles from the earlier film, Roland Culver replaced Claude Rains as Mr. Jordan.

== Plot ==
Terpsichore, one of the Nine Muses of Olympus, is annoyed that popular Broadway producer Danny Miller is putting on a play which portrays the Muses as man-crazy tarts fighting for the attention of a pair of Air Force pilots who crashed on Mount Parnassus. She asks permission from Mr. Jordan to go to Earth and fix the play. Jordan agrees and sends Messenger 7013 to keep an eye on her. Terpsichore uses the name Kitty Pendleton and quickly gets an agent, Max Corkle, and a part in the show. As the play is being rehearsed, Kitty convinces Danny that his depictions of the Muses are wrong. Danny, who has fallen madly in love with Kitty, soon agrees with her point of view and alters the play from a musical farce to a high-minded ballet in the style of Martha Graham, scored by Mario Castelnuovo-Tedesco.

The revised play debuts on the road (in Philadelphia) and is a complete flop. Danny, who is in debt to gangsters who will kill him unless the show is a success, is forced to go back to his original concept. He and Kitty quarrel over this, and Kitty plans to leave when Jordan shows up and explains the situation. Despite her argument with Danny, Kitty still loves him and decides to save him at the expense of her and her sisters' reputation. Overhearing the exchange, Corkle realizes that Jordan is the same heavenly messenger he had heard about some time ago when his friend Joe Pendleton had died and switched bodies. (Note: As depicted in Here Comes Mr. Jordan (1941)) Corkle reveals that Joe, now living his life as K.O. Murdock, is happily married with two children.

Kitty returns to the musical and performs Swingin' the Muses in Danny's original vision. When the musical becomes a hit, Kitty learns her time on Earth is up and she must return to Heaven, despite her pleas to stay with Danny. She manages to convince Corkle to tell the police about the gangsters before finding herself becoming invisible to mortals. Though he cannot see her, Danny discovers her coat that she left behind and becomes devastated at her sudden departure. He recasts the Terpsichore role to chorus girl Georgia Evans, who hires Corkle as her new agent. In Heaven, Jordan assures Kitty that she will see Danny again and grants her a vision of their eventual reunion in the afterlife.

== Cast ==
- Rita Hayworth as Terpsichore/Kitty Pendleton (singing voice dubbed by Anita Ellis)
- Larry Parks as Danny Miller (singing voice dubbed by Hal Derwin)
- Marc Platt as Eddie
- Roland Culver as Mr. Jordan
- James Gleason as Max Corkle
- Edward Everett Horton as Messenger 7013
- Adele Jergens as Georgia Evans/New Terpsichore (singing voice dubbed by Kay Starr)
- George Macready as Joe Manion
- William Frawley as the police lieutenant
- Kathleen O'Malley as Dolly (uncredited)
- William Haade as Spike (uncredited)
- James Burke as Detective Kelly (uncredited)
- Arthur Blake as Nathaniel Somerset (uncredited)
- Frank Darien as the janitor (uncredited)
- Ethan Laidlaw as the stagehand (uncredited)

The other eight muses (Urania, Polyhymnia, Euterpe, Erato, Clio, Calliope and Melpomene) are played by Lynn Merrick, Dusty Anderson, Peggy Maley, Tyra Vaughn, Virginia Hunter, Shirley Molohon, Mary Jane French, Lucille Casey, and Jo Hattigan.

== Remakes ==
The title "Down to Earth" was used for the comedy film Down to Earth (2001) starring Chris Rock, which is a remake of Here Comes Mr. Jordan.

Down to Earth is cited as an inspiration for the film Xanadu (1980) starring Olivia Newton-John, Michael Beck and Gene Kelly.

== See also ==
- List of films about angels
- Muses in popular culture
