= William McKenzie Morrison =

American photographer (1857–1921)

- Born: 23 March 1857; Detroit, Michigan
- Died: 24 March 1921 (aged 64)
- Occupation: Photographer

William McKenzie Morrison (March 23, 1857 – March 24, 1921) was an American photographer best known for photographs of theater performers in Chicago, Illinois.

== Biography ==
Morrison was born in 1857 in Detroit, Michigan, but moved to Chicago at the beginning of the American Civil War. He began working in a photography studio at the age of ten. He attended the Metropolitan Business College in Chicago, graduating in 1879, and he used his education to manage a series of photography studios until 1889, when he opened his own studio, located in the Haymarket Theatre. In 1899, he moved his studio out of the theater building to its own location.

In addition to photography, Morrison had numerous business interests, including real estate and ranching. He retired from photography in 1911, selling his business to his employees. Photographer Clara Louise Hagins worked for Morrison.
