= Clara Louise Hagins =

American photographer (1871–1957)

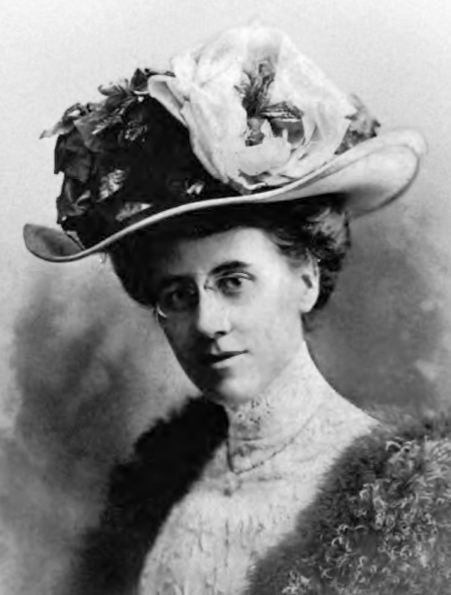
Clara Louise Hagins, from a 1914 publication.

Clara Louise Hagins (1871 – April 16, 1957) was an American photographer and clubwoman based in Chicago, Illinois.

== Early life ==
Clara Louise Hagins was born in Chicago, the daughter of John L. Hagins and Mary Ann McCormick Hagins. She had a younger sister, Alice Mary Hagins.

== Career ==
Hagins was a secretary and photographer at the William McKenzie Morrison portrait studio in Chicago. She was active in the Women's Federation of the Photographers' Association of America. She served as first vice president in the federation's executive board in 1914 and 1915, working with Maybelle Goodlander and the Gerhard Sisters, and she managed "the Circle", the federation's traveling collection of members' work. In 1921 she was vice-president of the Photographers' Association of America, at their meeting in Buffalo, New York. She was also active in the Association of Women's Clubs in Chicago, and in the Dickens Fellowship of Chicago.

== Personal life ==
Hagins moved to Tampa, Florida by the 1940s, and died there in 1957, aged 85 years.
