= The Kid from Brooklyn =

1946 film

- Directed by: Norman Z. McLeod
- Produced by: Samuel Goldwyn
- Starring: Danny Kaye; Virginia Mayo; Vera-Ellen; The Goldwyn Girls; Walter Abel; Eve Arden; Steve Cochran; Fay Bainter; Lionel Stander
- Cinematography: Gregg Toland
- Edited by: Daniel Mandell
- Music by: Carmen Dragon (uncredited)
- Production company: Samuel Goldwyn Productions
- Distributed by: RKO Radio Pictures
- Release date: March 21, 1946
- Running time: 113 minutes
- Country: United States
- Language: English
- Budget: $1,450,000 or over $2 million
- Box office: $5,490,000 (worldwide rentals)

The Kid from Brooklyn is a 1946 American musical comedy film directed by Norman Z. McLeod and starring Danny Kaye, Virginia Mayo, Vera-Ellen, Steve Cochran, Walter Abel, Eve Arden, and Fay Bainter. Virginia Mayo's and Vera-Ellen's singing voices were dubbed by Betty Russell and Dorothy Ellers, respectively.

Produced by Samuel Goldwyn, it is a remake of the Harold Lloyd film The Milky Way (1936) about a milkman who becomes world boxing champion. Lionel Stander plays the role of "Spider" Schultz in both versions of the movie.

== Plot ==
Well-meaning and mild-mannered milkman Burleigh Sullivan meets Polly Pringle, a beautiful, but out-of-work, singer, whilst on his rounds early in the morning. He tries to get her a job at the club where his sister Susie is performing, but gets the sack for his trouble. Whilst meeting Susie after the show, he sees her being molested by drunken boxer 'Speed' McFarlane and his bodyguard 'Spider'. In the fracas, Speed is knocked out and his manager, Gabby Sloan, is furious.

The newspapers pick up the story and photographers catch Burleigh 'knocking out' Speed again. In fact, as before, Speed is accidentally knocked out by Spider as a result of Sullivan's quick foot-work and propensity for ducking. Gabby decides to turn Burleigh into a fighter to turn the publicity to his advantage.

Burleigh goes on tour, but doesn't realize that all his fights have been fixed and his opponents have been asked to 'take a dive' to build up his image. He comes to think that he really is a great fighter, and develops a swollen head. Polly and Susie are not pleased with the turn of events. Meanwhile, Speed and Susie have become an item themselves.

Burleigh's contract is bought by Mr Austin, his former boss at Sunflower Milk, for $50,000, and he is set up to fight Speed for a charity fundraiser organised by socialite Mrs. E. Winthrop LeMoyne. Minutes before their bout, Speed is knocked out by Burleigh's miniature horse and is accidentally given medicine for insomnia rather than "ammonia" and falls asleep during the fight, giving Burleigh the win. Burleigh is reluctant to retire without having been KO'd, but Mrs. LeMoyne accidentally does just that. Now Burleigh can retire with a clear conscience. As promised by Mr Austin, he is given a partnership in the dairy company, with his former rival and new friend, Speed, as one of the district managers. But Gabby and Spider wind up working as milkmen.

== Cast ==
- Danny Kaye as Burleigh Sullivan
- Virginia Mayo as Polly Pringle
- Vera-Ellen as Susie Sullivan
- Steve Cochran as Speed McFarlane
- Eve Arden as Ann
- Walter Abel as Gabby
- Lionel Stander as Spider
- Fay Bainter as Mrs. LeMoyne
- Clarence Kolb as Mr. Austin
- The Goldwyn Girls as Themselves

== Reception ==
The film earned theatrical rentals of $3,960,000 in the United States and Canada and $1,530,000 overseas for a worldwide total of $5,490,000.

== See also ==
- List of boxing films
