= C. W. Goodlander =

American architect

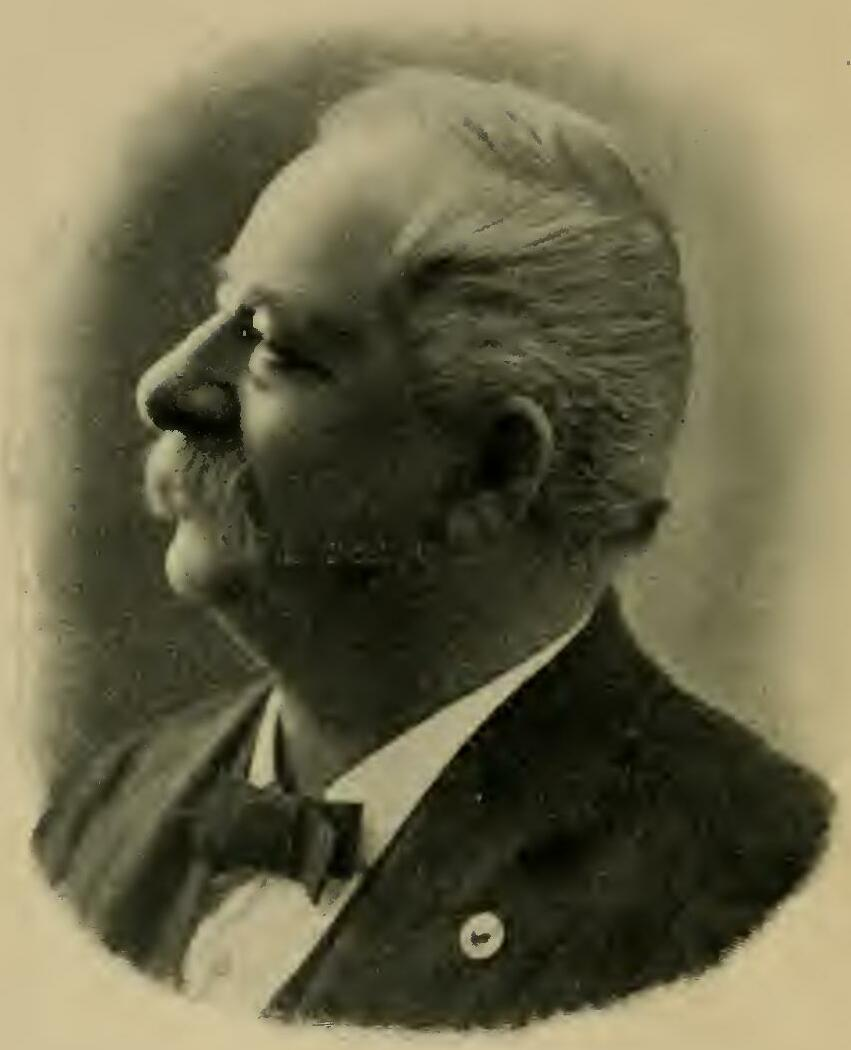
C. W. Goodlander

Charles Wesley Goodlander (1834–1902) was an architect, builder, businessman, banker, hotelier, and author in the United States. He designed the Cherokee National Capitol building (1869) and wrote Memoirs of C. W. Goodlander of the Early Days of Fort Scott about Fort Scott, Kansas. He also designed and built the Goodlander Hotel in 1887.

Goodlander gave funds for the Goodlander Children's Home in 1903, for the renovation and adaptation of his father-in-laws home. He was president of the Citizens National Bank of Fort Scott. He designed a Presbyterian church, city hall, and Miller Block in Fort Scott.

His nephew, also named Charles Goodlander (March 23, 1863 – May 13, 1914), served as mayor of Fort Scott.
