= Robert Sables =

American naval historian and author (1938–2016)

Robert Paul Sables
- Born: June 5, 1938; Scranton, Pennsylvania, U.S.
- Died: June 23, 2016 (aged 78); San Diego, California, U.S.
- Education: University of Scranton; Fordham University
- Occupation: Historian
- Spouse: Cathy
- Children: Jacqueline, Delia, William, and Robert

Robert Paul Sables (June 5, 1938 – June 23, 2016) was an American naval historian and author.

Sables died on June 23, 2016, at the age of 78.

== Education ==
Sables graduated in 1962 from the University of Scranton, Pennsylvania, and earned an MSW from Fordham University, New York City, in 1965.

== Military career ==
Sables was commissioned a 1st Lieutenant on November 12, 1970, and served in the 102nd Medical Battalion, 42nd Infantry Division, New York Army National Guard, and retired a lieutenant colonel from the U.S. Army Reserve in 1998.

== Civilian career ==
He also served as a probation officer for the City of New York for twenty years. Upon retirement, he began researching and writing about U.S. Naval history. Many of his articles have been published in Sea Classics, a monthly periodical which focuses on the history of naval vessels. Sables has been married to his wife Cathy since 1967, and they raised four children (daughters Jacqueline and Delia, sons William and Robert).

== Magazine articles ==
- “The Armed Yacht's of World War II.” Sea Classics, December 2000, Volume 33, Number 12.
- “The Coastal Patrol Yachts of WW II.” Sea Classics, July 2001, Volume 34, Number 7.
- “Above US the Sea: ‘O-Class’ Submarines of World Wars I and II.” Sea Classics, October 2001, Volume 34, Number 10.
- “The Tuna Fleet That Went to War.” Sea Classics, April 2002, Volume 35, Number 4.
- “Coast Guard Emergency WW II Acquisitions.” Sea Classics, October 2002, Volume 35, Number 10.
- “When Corvettes Flew the Stars and Stripes.” Sea Classics, November 2003, Volume 36, Number 11.
- “Fatal Impact: Naval Collisions in WW II.” Sea Classics, February 2004, Volume 37, Number 2.
- “Corvina's Mysterious First and Last War Patrol.” Sea Classics, October 2005, Volume 38, Number 10.
- "PC-815: The Jinxed Sub-Chaser!". Sea Classics. 39 (1). January 1, 2006. Archived from the original on October 22, 2008 – via FindArticles.
- "The 53 Days of LST-921". Sea Classics. 39 (12). December 2006. Archived from the original on March 4, 2007 – via FindArticles.

== Books ==
- Mates Forever, USS Wasmuth and USS Ramapo. Victoria: Trafford, 2004. ISBN 1-4120-3498-1

== See also ==
- USS PC-815
