= Bill Lazor =

American football player and coach (born 1972)

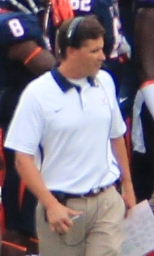
- Lazor coaching for Virginia in 2012

Houston Texans
- Title: Senior defensive assistant

Personal information
- Born: June 14, 1972 (age 54); Scranton, Pennsylvania, U.S.

Career information
- Position: Quarterback
- High school: Scranton (PA) Central
- College: Cornell (1990-1993)

Career history
- Cornell (1994–1998) Offensive assistant; Cornell (1999-2000) Quarterbacks coach & passing game coordinator; Buffalo (2001–2002) Offensive coordinator & quarterbacks coach; Atlanta Falcons (2003) Offensive quality control coach; Washington Redskins (2004–2005) Offensive assistant; Washington Redskins (2006–2007) Quarterbacks coach; Seattle Seahawks (2008–2009) Quarterbacks coach; Virginia (2010–2012) Offensive coordinator & quarterbacks coach; Philadelphia Eagles (2013) Quarterbacks coach; Miami Dolphins (2014–2015) Offensive coordinator; Cincinnati Bengals (2016) Quarterbacks coach; Cincinnati Bengals (2017–2018) Offensive coordinator; Penn State (2019) Analyst; Chicago Bears (2020–2021) Offensive coordinator; Houston Texans (2023–present); Senior offensive assistant (2023–2025); Senior defensive assistant (2026–present)
- Coaching profile at Pro Football Reference

William V. Lazor (born June 14, 1972) is an American football coach who is the senior defensive assistant for the Houston Texans of the National Football League (NFL). Lazor has previously served as the quarterbacks coach for the Washington Commanders, Seattle Seahawks, and Philadelphia Eagles. He is also the former offensive coordinator of the Miami Dolphins, Cincinnati Bengals, and Chicago Bears. He played college football as a quarterback for Cornell University from 1990 to 1993.

== Playing career ==
Lazor played football at Cornell University. He was the team’s starting quarterback from 1991 to 1993. In 28 career games played, Lazor threw for 5,697 yards, 34 touchdowns, and 26 interceptions. He was inducted to the Cornell University Athletics Hall of Fame in 2012.

== Coaching career ==
=== College football ===
After graduating from Cornell, Lazor stayed with the football program, serving as an offensive assistant from 1994 to 1998, before being promoted to quarterbacks coach and passing game coordinator in 1999, a role he held for two seasons. He spent 2001-2002 as the offensive coordinator and quarterbacks coach for Buffalo.

=== Atlanta Falcons ===
Lazor entered the NFL coaching ranks in 2003 under head coach Dan Reeves as the Atlanta Falcons offensive quality control coach.

=== Washington Redskins ===
Lazor spent four seasons with the Washington Redskins, two of which were spent as the quarterbacks coach for head coach Joe Gibbs. During the 2004 and 2005 seasons, Lazor served as an offensive assistant.

=== Seattle Seahawks ===
Lazor coached quarterbacks for two seasons with the Seattle Seahawks under head coaches Mike Holmgren and Jim Mora.

=== University of Virginia ===
On January 28, 2010, Lazor was officially announced as the new offensive coordinator of the University of Virginia Cavaliers.

=== Philadelphia Eagles ===
On January 29, 2013, Lazor accepted a position with the Philadelphia Eagles as the quarterbacks coach, coaching alongside Chip Kelly.

=== Miami Dolphins ===
On January 15, 2014, Lazor was named offensive coordinator of the Miami Dolphins. He was fired on November 30, 2015.

=== Cincinnati Bengals ===
On January 18, 2016, Lazor was named quarterback coach for the Cincinnati Bengals, replacing recently promoted Ken Zampese.

On September 15, 2017, Lazor was named the Bengals offensive coordinator, taking the place of the recently fired Zampese. Lazor was promoted to full time offensive coordinator for the Bengals on January 3, 2018.

On January 11, 2019, Lazor was fired by the Bengals.

=== Chicago Bears ===
On January 16, 2020, Lazor was hired by the Chicago Bears as their offensive coordinator, replacing Mark Helfrich.

On November 13, 2020, head coach Matt Nagy relinquished play-calling duties to Lazor. The Bears offense noticeably improved, increasing from scoring an average of 19 points per game in the first 9 weeks of the season, compared to the 27 points per game in the latter 5 weeks where Lazor was in charge.

Although Nagy resumed calling plays in 2021, Lazor reassumed the responsibility again by Week 4.

Lazor was let go by the Bears after the 2021 season.

=== Houston Texans ===
On February 24, 2023, Lazor was hired to be the Houston Texans Senior offensive assistant.

== Personal life ==
Lazor earned his bachelor's degree in Human Development and Family Studies from Cornell in 1994. He is married to wife Nicole, with whom he has three kids, Nolan, Marin, and Charlotte.
