= Tyra Vaughn =

American actress

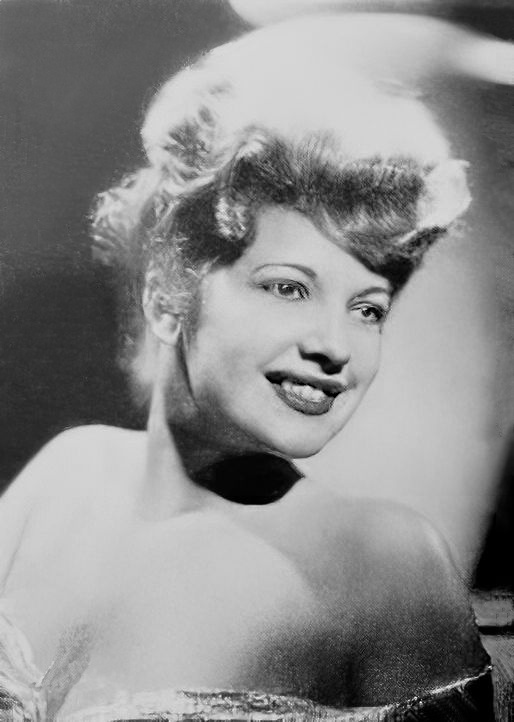
- Born: March 13, 1923; Scranton, Pennsylvania, U.S.
- Died: August 9, 2015 (aged 92); Northridge, California, U.S.
- Occupations: Actress, dance instructor
- Years active: 1941–88

Tyra Vaughn (March 13, 1923 – August 9, 2015) was an American actress, model, and showgirl, who appeared in motion pictures and television throughout the 1940s and late 1950s, and who later found a second career as a professional dance instructor.

== Early life ==
She was born on March 13, 1923, in Scranton, Pennsylvania. Her father was a police sergeant. She attended West Scranton High School from which was she was active in the drama club and graduated in June 1941. With the outbreak of World War II, she moved to Los Angeles and joined the USO as a professional dancer.

In 1943, she joined other variety showgirls in protesting a waiters' strike at Earl Carroll's Theater-Restaurant in Hollywood. She was a swimsuit model, named "Miss Springtime of 1944" by the Blue Book modeling agency, run by Emmeline Snively. Later in 1944 she appeared as an artist's model in a segment for NBC's People are Funny program.

== Career ==
After World War II, Vaughn was a dance instructor for the Hollywood Athletic Club, before producer Samuel Goldwyn selected her for his 1940s Goldwyn Girls ensemble. She later appeared (without credits) in such movies as The Harvey Girls (1946), The Kid from Brooklyn (1946), Down to Earth (1947), Letter from an Unknown Woman (1948), Duchess of Idaho (1950), and Gentlemen Prefer Blondes (1953). As a friend of actress and swimmer Esther Williams, she landed a recurring role on the Lux Video Theatre with Williams' help, appearing in several episodes between 1950 and 1957. When the series ended, Vaughn left acting and lived in Southern California, teaching dance until her 1988 retirement.

== Personal life ==
Vaughn died aged 92 on August 9, 2015, in Northridge, California, from natural causes.

== Filmography ==
Year	Program (episode)	Role
1957	Lux Video Theatre (Judge Not)	Noreen
1957	Lux Video Theatre (The Softest Music)	Emmaline
1957	Lux Video Theatre (Edge of Doubt)	Violet
1957	Lux Video Theatre (Stand-In for Murder)	Connie
1956	Lux Video Theatre (Only Yesterday)	Helen
1956	Lux Video Theatre (Hired Wife)	Lynn
1955	Lux Video Theatre (The Nine-Penny Dream)	Jane
1954	Lux Video Theatre (Imperfect Lady)	Beverly
1954	Lux Video Theatre (A Visit from Evelyn)	Myrna
1954	Lux Video Theatre (Call Off the Wedding)	Dorothy
1953	Lux Video Theatre (Two for Tea)	Charlotte
1952	Lux Video Theatre (The Orchard)	Elizabeth
1951	Lux Video Theatre (Dames Are Poison)	Patricia
1951	Lux Video Theatre (The Shiny People)	Carol
1950	Lux Video Theatre (The Lovely Menace)	Party Extra
1950	Lux Video Theatre (Mine to Have)	Sally
1953	How to Marry a Millionaire	Model (uncredited)
1953	Gentlemen Prefer Blondes	Chorus Girl (uncredited)
1952	April in Paris	Chorine (uncredited)
1952	Singin' in the Rain	Chorus Girl (uncredited)
1951	Starlift	Nurse (uncredited)
1951	Meet Me After the Show	Gold Digger (uncredited)
1951	On the Riviera	Specialty Dancer (uncredited)
1950	Duchess of Idaho	Diane (uncredited)
1949	Samson and Delilah	Temple Spectator (uncredited)
1949	On the Town	Dancer in "Day in New York" Ballet (uncredited)
1949	Fighting Man of the Plains	Saloon Girl (uncredited)
1948	Romance on the High Seas	Ship Passenger (uncredited)
1948	Up in Central Park	Young Lady (uncredited)
1948	Letter from an Unknown Woman	Ballet Dancer (uncredited)
1947	Escape Me Never	Girl (uncredited)
1947	Down to Earth	Muse (uncredited)
1947	Trail Street	Dance Hall Girl (uncredited)
1946	The Time, the Place and the Girl	Chorine (uncredited)
1946	The Razor's Edge	Showgirl (uncredited)
1946	Three Little Girls in Blue	Minor Role (uncredited)
1946	Shadows Over Chinatown	Miss Chalmers
1946	The Kid from Brooklyn	Goldwyn Girl (uncredited)
1946	The Harvey Girls	Dance-Hall Girl (uncredited)
