= Jake McCarthy =

American baseball player (born 1997)

Colorado Rockies – No. 31
- Outfielder
- Born: July 30, 1997 (age 29); Scranton, Pennsylvania, U.S.
- Bats: Left Throws: Left

MLB debut
- August 27, 2021, for the Arizona Diamondbacks

MLB statistics (through 2026 season)
- Batting average: .269
- Home runs: 39
- Runs batted in: 222
- Stolen bases: 115
- Stats at Baseball Reference

Teams
- Arizona Diamondbacks (2021–2025); Colorado Rockies (2026–present)

Jacob Joseph McCarthy (born July 30, 1997) is an American professional baseball outfielder for the Colorado Rockies of Major League Baseball (MLB). He has previously played in MLB for the Arizona Diamondbacks. He made his MLB debut in 2021.

== Amateur career ==
McCarthy attended Scranton High School in Scranton, Pennsylvania. He was drafted by the Pittsburgh Pirates in the 23rd round of the 2015 Major League Baseball draft, but did not sign and played college baseball at the University of Virginia. In 2017, he played collegiate summer baseball with the Harwich Mariners of the Cape Cod Baseball League. After three seasons at Virginia, where he stole 36 bases in 38 attempts while batting .337/.423/.476, he was drafted by the Arizona Diamondbacks in the competitive balance round A of the 2018 MLB draft.

== Professional career ==
=== Arizona Diamondbacks ===
McCarthy signed with the Diamondbacks for a $1.65 million signing bonus and made his professional debut with the Arizona League Diamondbacks before being promoted to the Hillsboro Hops. He played 2019 with the Visalia Rawhide, batting .277/.341/.405 in 195 at bats with 18 steals in 20 attempts, and after the season played in the Arizona Fall League.

McCarthy did not play in a game in 2020 due to the cancellation of the minor league season because of the COVID-19 pandemic. McCarthy started 2021 with the Double-A Amarillo Sod Poodles before being promoted to the Triple-A Reno Aces. Between the two teams he batted .253/.332/.500 with 29 stolen bases in 33 attempts.

The Diamondbacks promoted McCarthy to the major leagues on August 27, 2021. On August 29, McCarthy collected his first career hit, an RBI double off of Philadelphia Phillies starter Ranger Suárez. McCarthy finished the 2021 major league season with a .220/.333/.373 slash line, with 13 hits, three doubles, two home runs, four RBI, and eight walks, all in 24 games.

In 2022, McCarthy slashed .283/.342/.427 in 321 at-bats, with 23 stolen bases in 26 attempts. He had the fastest sprint speed of all major league right fielders, at 30.1 feet/second. In 2023, McCarthy batted .243/.318/.326 slash line, with 67 hits, seven doubles, two home runs, 16 RBI, and 26 walks, all in 99 games.

In 2024, McCarthy batted .285/.349/.400 slash line, with 126 hits, 13 doubles, eight home runs, 56 RBI, and 31 walks across 142 appearances.

McCarthy began the 2025 season batting 3-for-41 (.073) and was optioned to Reno on April 19. After batting .314 in 49 games for Reno, the Diamondbacks recalled him on June 24. McCarthy made 67 appearances for Arizona during the regular season, batting .204/.247/.345 with four home runs, 20 RBI, and six stolen bases.

=== Colorado Rockies ===
On January 10, 2026, the Diamondbacks traded McCarthy to the Colorado Rockies in exchange for Josh Grosz. On July 3, 2026, McCarthy became the first player ever with a leadoff home run, grand slam, and stolen base in a single game during a 15–3 victory over the San Francisco Giants. He finished the 2026 season with career highs of 15 home runs, 83 RBIs, 32 stolen bases, 260 total bases, a .291 batting average and an .809 OPS.

== Personal life ==
His brother, Joe McCarthy, was also a baseball player.

McCarthy and his wife, Sophie, were married in January 2025 in Philadelphia.
