= Joe McCarthy (outfielder) =

American baseball player (born 1994)

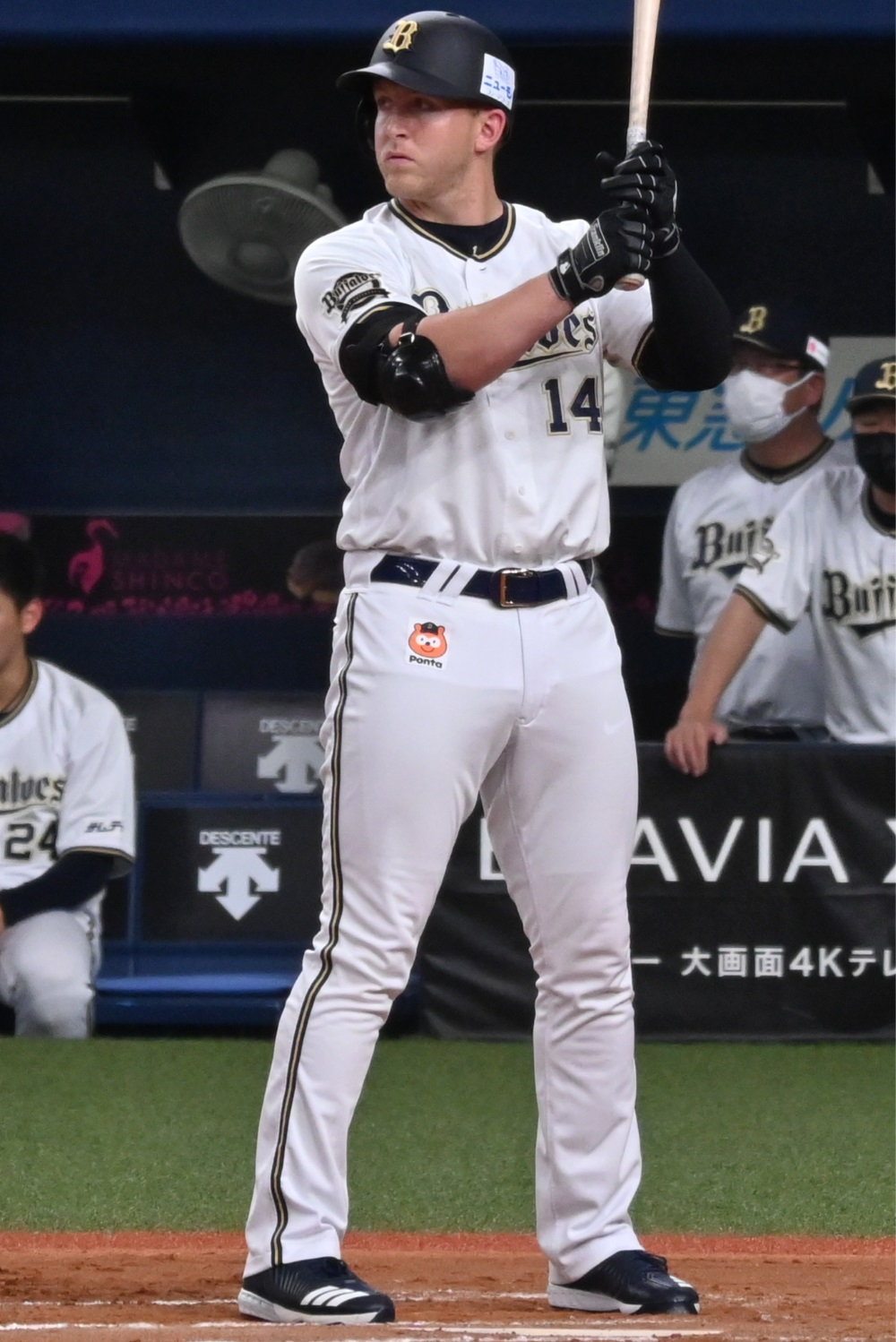
- McCarthy with the Orix Buffaloes
- Outfielder / First baseman
- Born: February 23, 1994 (age 32); Scranton, Pennsylvania, U.S.
- Batted: Left Threw: Left

Professional debut
- MLB: July 23, 2020, for the San Francisco Giants
- NPB: April 8, 2022, for the Orix Buffaloes

Last appearance
- MLB: July 28, 2020, for the San Francisco Giants
- NPB: September 27, 2022, for the Orix Buffaloes

MLB statistics
- Batting average: .000
- Home runs: 0
- Runs batted in: 0

NPB statistics
- Batting average: .225
- Home runs: 4
- Runs batted in: 19
- Stats at Baseball Reference

Teams
- San Francisco Giants (2020); Orix Buffaloes (2022)

Career highlights and awards
- Japan Series champion (2022)

Joseph Edward McCarthy Jr. (born February 23, 1994) is an American former professional baseball outfielder and first baseman. He played in Major League Baseball (MLB) for the San Francisco Giants, and in Nippon Professional Baseball (NPB) for the Orix Buffaloes. He played college baseball for the University of Virginia. The Tampa Bay Rays selected McCarthy in the fifth round of the 2015 MLB draft, and traded him to the Giants in 2019. McCarthy made his MLB debut in 2020.

== Amateur career ==
McCarthy graduated from Scranton High School in Scranton, Pennsylvania. After his senior year, in 2012, The Scranton Times-Tribune named him their Male High School Athlete of the Year.

McCarthy attended the University of Virginia, and played college baseball for the Virginia Cavaliers. In 2014, he played collegiate summer baseball with the Harwich Mariners of the Cape Cod Baseball League. His 2015 season debut was delayed by back surgery. In three seasons at Virginia, he played in 162 games with a .294 batting average, 12 home runs, 25 stolen bases in 27 attempts, and 111 RBIs, with 113 walks and 86 strikeouts.

== Professional career ==
=== Tampa Bay Rays ===
The Tampa Bay Rays selected McCarthy in the fifth round, with the 148th overall selection, of the 2015 MLB draft. He signed with the Rays, receiving a $358,900 signing bonus. He began his professional career with the Hudson Valley Renegades of the Class A-Short Season New York-Penn League that same year and spent the whole season there, batting .277/.362/.337 with 21 RBIs and 18 stolen bases in 49 games.

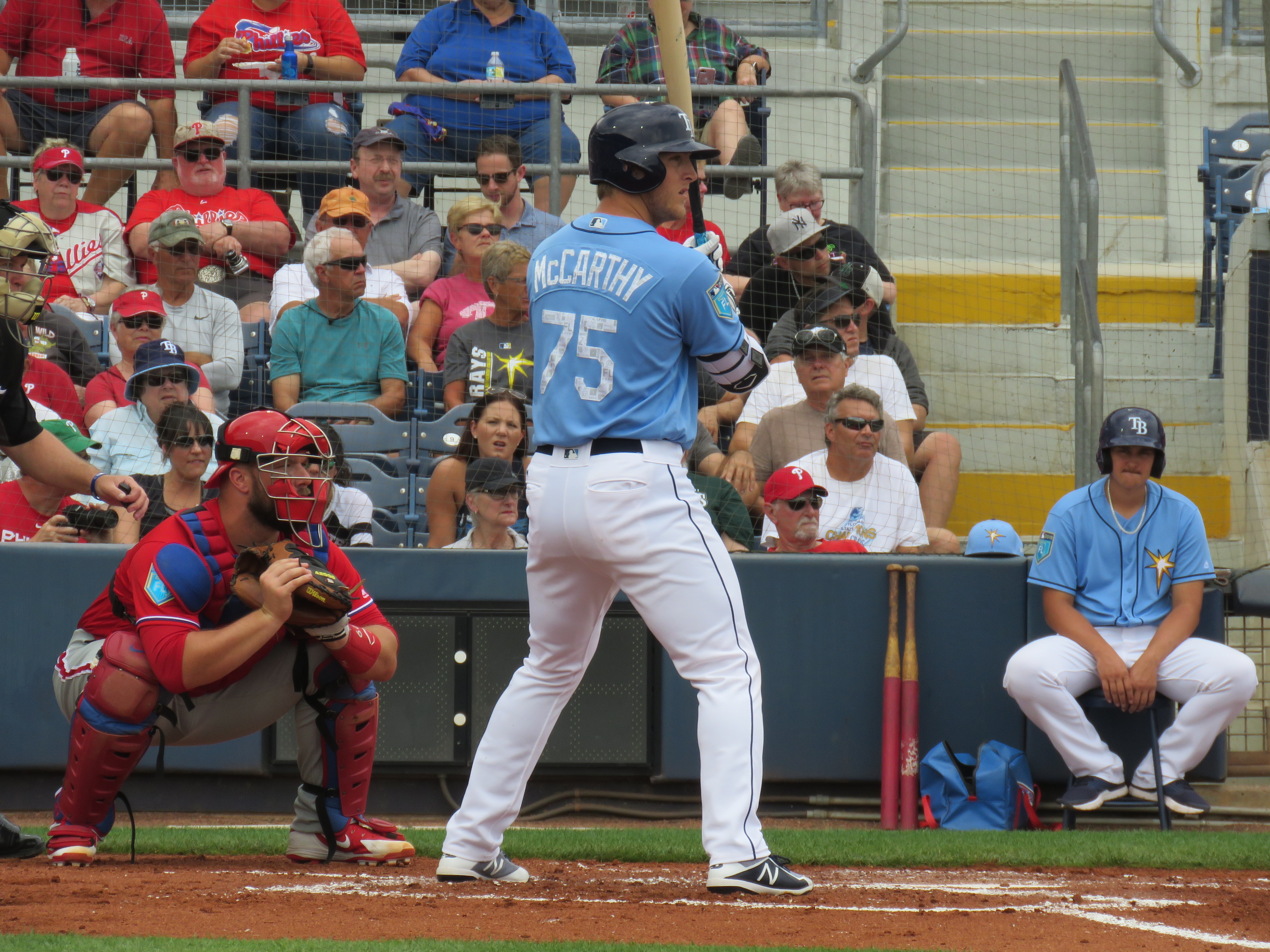
McCarthy with the Tampa Bay Rays

McCarthy began the 2016 season with the Bowling Green Hot Rods of the Class A Midwest League. In June, the Rays promoted him to the Charlotte Stone Crabs of the Class A-Advanced Florida State League. In 104 total games between the two teams, he slashed .285/.398/.430 with eight home runs, 60 RBIs, and 19 stolen bases.

In 2017, he played for the Montgomery Biscuits of the Class AA Southern League where he batted .284/.409.434 with seven home runs, 56 RBIs, 20 stolen bases, and an .843 OPS in 127 games.

The Rays invited McCarthy to spring training in 2018. He spent the 2018 season with the Durham Bulls of the Class AAA International League, with whom he batted .269/.377/.513, and then played for the Peoria Javelinas of the Arizona Fall League. The Rays added him to their 40-man roster after the season.

=== San Francisco Giants ===
On July 31, 2019, the Rays traded McCarthy to the San Francisco Giants in exchange for Jacob Lopez. He was assigned to the Sacramento River Cats following the trade, and hit .165/.247/.241/.488 with 1 home run and 4 RBIs for them in 79 at bats.

McCarthy made the Giants' Opening Day roster in 2020, and he made his MLB debut on Opening Day as the starting right fielder. On August 20, 2020, McCarthy was designated for assignment. The Giants outrighted him to the minor leagues on August 27.

McCarthy spent the 2021 season with Triple-A Sacramento. He played in 64 games, hitting .305 with 15 home runs and 55 RBI's. McCarthy became a minor league free agent following the season on November 7, 2021.

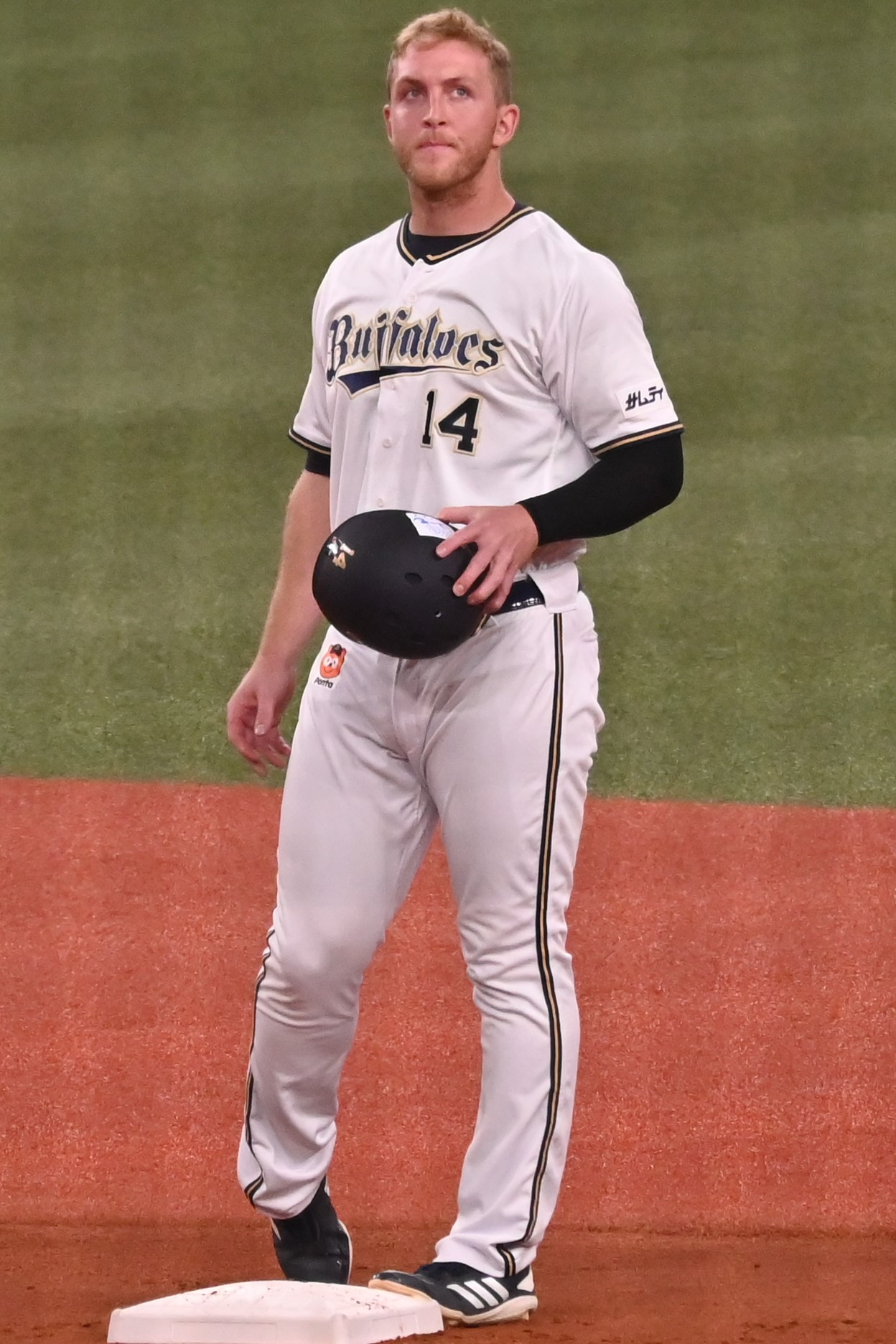
McCarthy with the Orix Buffaloes

=== Orix Buffaloes ===
On February 2, 2022, McCarthy signed a minor league contract with the Texas Rangers organization. On April 15, McCarthy agreed to a contract with the Orix Buffaloes of Nippon Professional Baseball. McCarthy was officially released on April 20 so he could report to the team. He became a free agent following the 2022 season.

=== Texas Rangers ===
On December 21, 2022, McCarthy signed a minor league deal with the Texas Rangers receiving an invitation to spring training. McCarthy hit .258/.343/.419 during spring training, but was released by the Rangers on March 24, 2023.

== Personal life ==
McCarthy's father, Joe Sr., played college baseball for the University of South Carolina. His brother, Jake, also played for Virginia and was drafted by the Arizona Diamondbacks in the first round of the 2018 Major League Baseball draft.
