= Marc Spindler =

American football player (born 1969)

No. 92, 93
- Positions: Defensive tackle, defensive end

Personal information
- Born: November 28, 1969 (age 56); Scranton, Pennsylvania, U.S.
- Listed height: 6 ft 5 in (1.96 m)
- Listed weight: 290 lb (132 kg)

Career information
- High school: West Scranton
- College: Pittsburgh
- NFL draft: 1990: 3rd round, 62nd overall pick

Career history
- Detroit Lions (1990–1994); Tampa Bay Buccaneers (1995)*; New York Jets (1995–1996); Seattle Seahawks (1997)*; Chicago Bears (1997)*; Detroit Lions (1997–1998)
- * Offseason or practice squad member only

Awards and highlights
- Second-team All-American (1989); First-team All-East (1989)

Career NFL statistics
- Tackles: 222
- Sacks: 9.5
- Fumble recoveries: 4
- Stats at Pro Football Reference

Marc Spindler (born November 28, 1969) is an American former professional football player who was a defensive tackle and defensive end for nine seasons in the National Football League (NFL). He was selected by the Detroit Lions in the third round of the 1990 NFL draft with the 62nd overall pick. Since retiring from football, Spindler has worked for both WDFN and WXYT, two Detroit area sports talk radio stations.

In 1986, Spindler was named USA Today High School Defensive Player of the Year.

== Personal life ==
Spinder's son, Rocco, was a college football offensive lineman for the University of Notre Dame and Nebraska Cornhuskers.
