= Bill Ferrario =

American football player (1978–2025)

No. 63, 64
- Position: Guard

Personal information
- Born: September 22, 1978; Scranton, Pennsylvania, U.S.
- Died: September 23, 2025 (aged 47)
- Listed height: 6 ft 2 in (1.88 m)
- Listed weight: 315 lb (143 kg)

Career information
- High school: West Scranton
- College: Wisconsin
- NFL draft: 2001: 4th round, 105th overall pick

Career history
- Green Bay Packers (2001–2002); Washington Redskins (2004)*; Carolina Panthers (2004)
- * Offseason or practice squad member only

Awards and highlights
- First-team All-Big Ten (1999); Second-team All-Big Ten (2000)

Career NFL statistics
- Games played: 16
- Games started: 0
- Stats at Pro Football Reference

William James Ferrario (September 22, 1978 – September 23, 2025) was an American professional football player who was a guard in the National Football League (NFL), primarily with the Green Bay Packers. He played college football for the Wisconsin Badgers.

== Early life ==
Ferrario was born on September 22, 1978. While at West Scranton High School, Ferrario earned honorable mention all-star honors in his conference as a junior and senior. In addition to Wisconsin, where he committed, he received interest from Penn State, Temple, Army, and Syracuse.

== College career ==
Ferrario came to Madison as a defensive lineman but moved to the offensive line a year later. He was a second-team All-Big Ten guard at the University of Wisconsin–Madison, where he paved the way as a blocker for 1999 Heisman Trophy winner Ron Dayne. He started all 50 games in his career, becoming only the 3rd player in Big Ten history to accomplish this feat. He helped Wisconsin win back-to-back Rose Bowl Championships in 1999 and 2000. Among Wisconsin players, he is tied for fourth in games started and his streak of 50 consecutive starts is tied for the second longest in program history.

== Professional career ==
Ferrario was a 4th round selection (105th overall pick) in the 2001 NFL draft by the Green Bay Packers. He was with the Packers through the 2002 season where he saw action in all 16 games. Waived by Green Bay in 2003, Ferrario signed with the Washington Redskins on February 4, 2004, only to be released on September 5, 2004. He signed with the Carolina Panthers on November 11, 2004, but did not play in any games that season. Ferrario was released by the Panthers on August 28, 2005.

== Life after football ==
After his NFL career, Ferrario moved to Wausau, Wisconsin, where he sold real estate and pursued a career in the medical sales industry.

Ferrario worked with local athletes to improve their skills and fundamentals, and at summer football camps.

On January 2, 2023, Ferrario was reported to police for concerning behavior at his home. That same evening, he was taken to a hotel room. Around 8 p.m. the following night, Ferrario was arrested for disorderly conduct and booked within the Marathon County Jail. He also faced charges for a second OWI offense stemming from an October 12, 2022 incident where Ferrario had lost control of his vehicle and crashed. He was nearly three times the legal limit for alcohol vehicle operation in this incident.

On February 27, 2023, Ferrario was arrested in Eau Claire County on an arrest warrant and faced multiple charges including stalking, intimidation of a victim, and more after breaking bond conditions, according to a Marathon County criminal complaint.

Ferrario died on September 23, 2025, one day after his 47th birthday. Details of his death have not been publicly released.
