= Scranton School District (Pennsylvania) =

School district in Pennsylvania

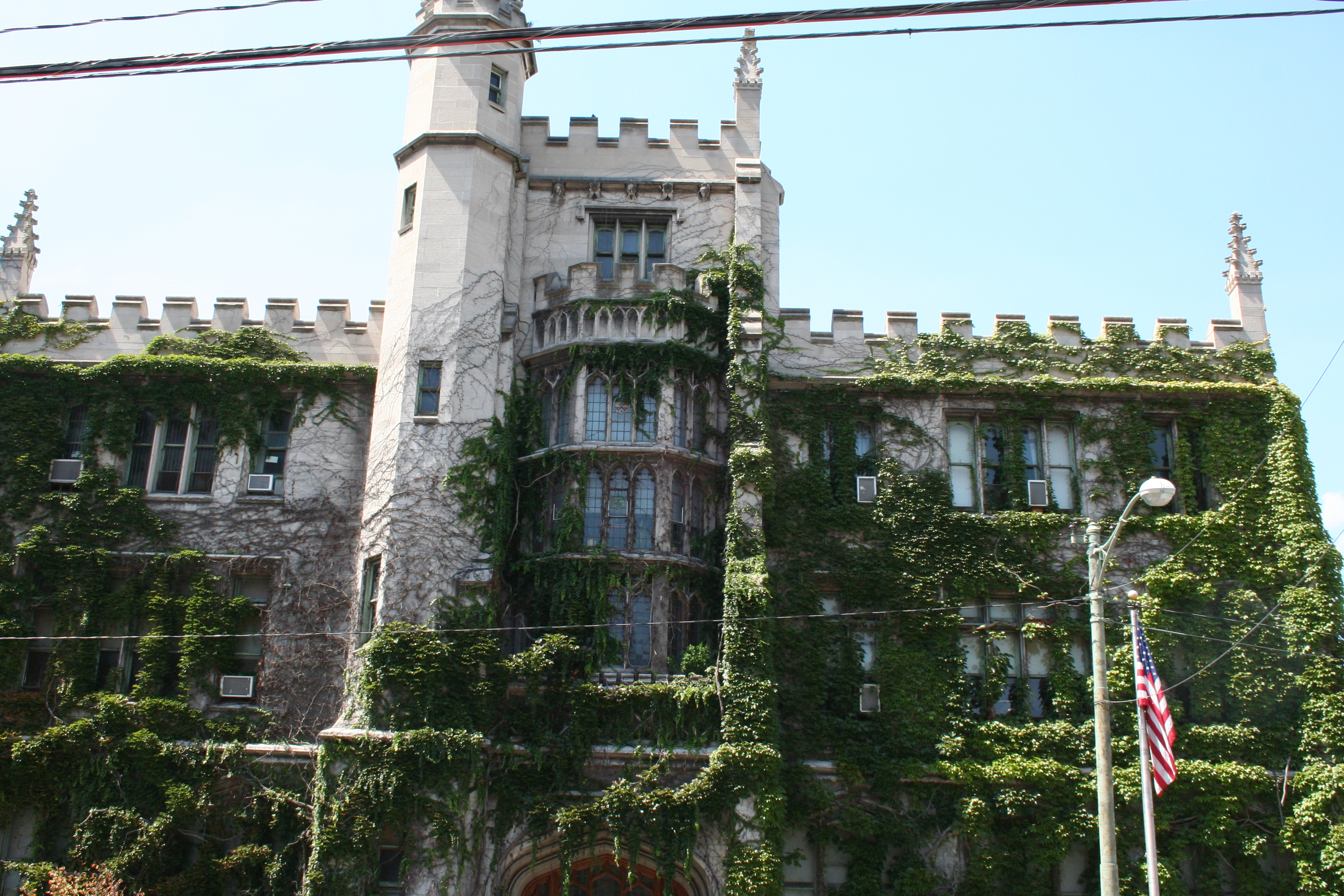
- The school district administration building

Address
- 425 N Washington Ave Scranton, Pennsylvania, 18503; United States

District information
- Type: Public
- Grades: Pre-K–12
- Schools: 15, including Scranton High School and West Scranton High School
- Budget: $216.5 million
- NCES District ID: 4221090

Students and staff
- Students: 9,273 (2021-2022)
- Teachers: 669
- Student–teacher ratio: 14:1
- Athletic conference: Lackawanna League

Other information
- Website: www.scrsd.org

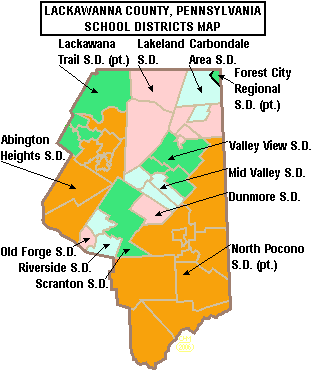
Map of Lackawanna County, Pennsylvania's public school districts with Scranton School District highlighted in green in the east-central portion of the county

The Scranton School District is a large, urban school district located in Scranton, Pennsylvania in the Wyoming Valley region of northeastern Pennsylvania. It serves all of the city of Scranton in Lackawanna County, Pennsylvania. The district encompasses approximately 26 square miles. According to the 2020 census, the Scranton School District serves a resident population of 76,997. The educational attainment levels for the Scranton School District population (25 years old and over) were 83.9% high school graduates and 19.3% college graduates. The district is one of the 500 public school districts of Pennsylvania.

According to the Pennsylvania Budget and Policy Center, 63.7% of the district's pupils lived at 185% or below the Federal Poverty Level as shown by their eligibility for the federal free or reduced price school meal programs in 2012. In 2013, the Pennsylvania Department of Education, reported that 145 students in the Scranton School District were homeless.

In 2009, Scranton School District residents’ per capita income was $16,174, while the median family income was $39,233. In the Commonwealth, the median family income was $49,501 and the United States median family income was $49,445, in 2010. In Lackawanna County, the median household income was $43,673. By 2013, the median household income in the United States rose to $52,100. In 2014, the median household income in the USA was $53,700.

The Northeastern Educational Intermediate Unit IU19 provides the district with a wide variety of services like: specialized education for disabled students; state mandated training on recognizing and reporting child abuse; speech and visual disability services; criminal background check processing for prospective employees and professional development for staff and faculty.

== Schools ==
There are thirteen preschool classes operated in twelve different settings.

=== Elementary ===
- John Adams Elementary
- Neil Armstrong Elementary
- Isaac Tripp Elementary
- John F. Kennedy Elementary
- William Prescott Elementary
- Charles Sumner Elementary
- John G. Whittier Elementary
- Frances Willard Elementary
- McNichols Plaza Elementary
- Robert Morris Elementary

=== Intermediate schools ===
- Northeast Scranton Intermediate
- South Scranton Intermediate
- West Scranton Intermediate

=== High schools ===
- Scranton High School
- West Scranton High School

High school students may choose to attend the Career Technology Center of Lackawanna County (CTCLC) for training in construction and mechanical trades; automotive repairs; cosmetology; welding, Visual Art and Design and allied Health Occupations.
