= Anthony Chickillo =

American football player (born 1992)

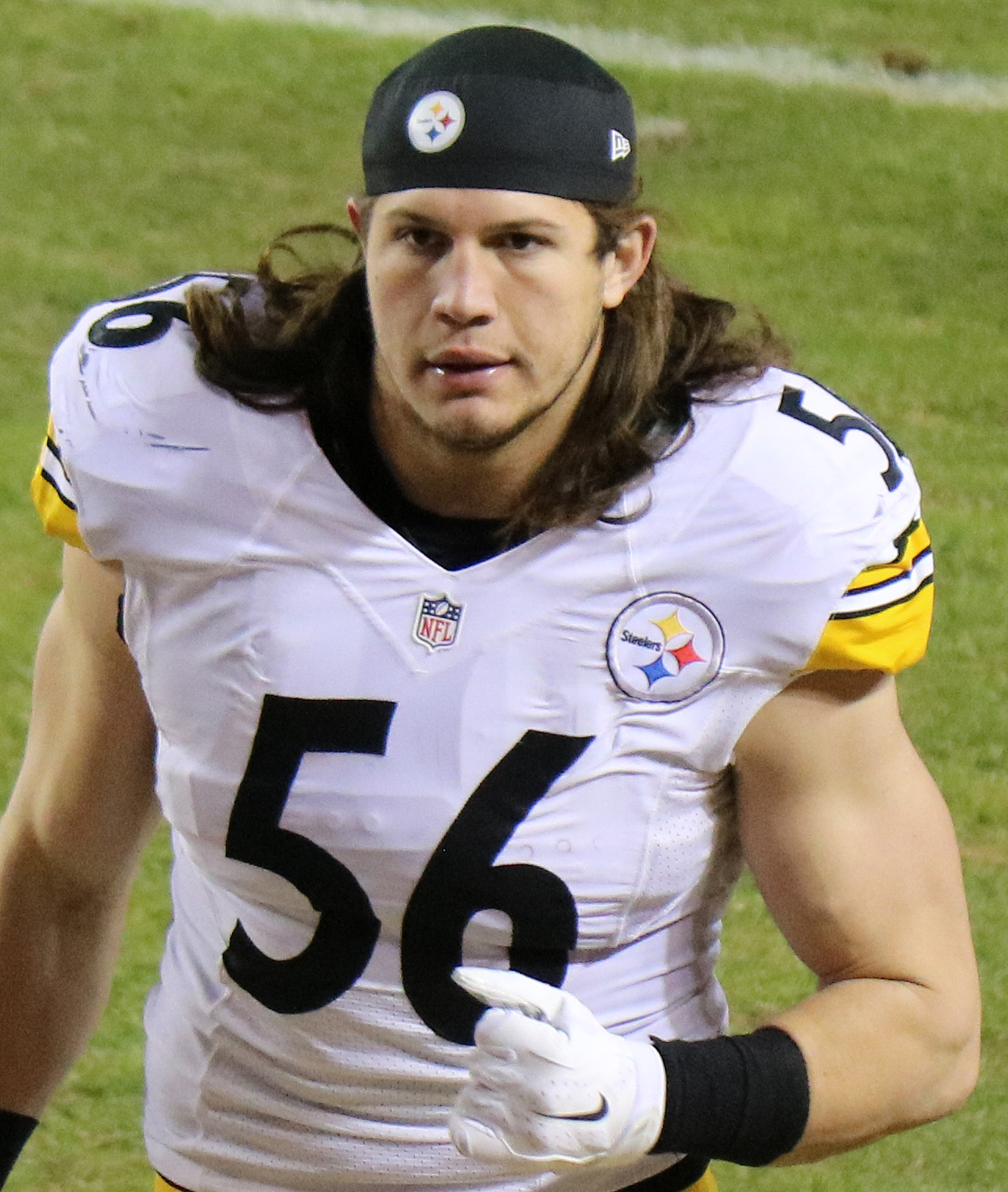
- Chickillo with the Pittsburgh Steelers in 2015

No. 56, 91
- Positions: Linebacker, defensive end

Personal information
- Born: December 10, 1992 (age 33); Tampa, Florida, U.S.
- Listed height: 6 ft 3 in (1.91 m)
- Listed weight: 255 lb (116 kg)

Career information
- High school: Braulio Alonso (Tampa)
- College: Miami (FL) (2011–2014)
- NFL draft: 2015: 6th round, 212th overall pick

Career history
- Pittsburgh Steelers (2015–2019); New Orleans Saints (2020)*; Denver Broncos (2020)
- * Offseason or practice squad member only

Career NFL statistics
- Total tackles: 108
- Sacks: 8.5
- Forced fumbles: 3
- Fumble recoveries: 3
- Total touchdowns: 1
- Stats at Pro Football Reference

Anthony Louis Nicholas Chickillo (born December 10, 1992) is an American former professional football player who was a linebacker in the National Football League (NFL). He played college football for the Miami Hurricanes and was selected by the Pittsburgh Steelers in the sixth round of the 2015 NFL draft. He was also a member of the New Orleans Saints and Denver Broncos.

== Early life ==
Chickillo attended Gaither High School in Tampa, Florida prior to transferring to Braulio Alonso High School, which is also in Tampa, before his junior year. As a senior, he had 140 tackles, 18 sacks and two interceptions. Chickillo was named the MVP of the 2011 Under Armour All-America Game after he recorded 1.5 sacks and a fumble recovery. He was rated by Rivals.com as a four-star recruit and was ranked as the third best defensive end in his class. He committed to the University of Miami to play college football.

== College career ==
Chickillo played at Miami from 2011 to 2014. He entered his freshman season as a backup before becoming a starter. After three games, he became a starter and would start the next 47 games through his senior year. He finished his career with 170 tackles and 15.5 sacks.

== Professional career ==
=== Pre-draft ===
Coming out of college, Chickillo was projected by some analysts to be a fourth to sixth-round draft pick. He was rated the 13th-best defensive end out of the 148 available by NFLDraftScout.com. Many scouts were divided on what position he was best suited for and classified him as a tweener. He received mostly mixed reviews from analysts and was thought to be a future rotational defensive end. Chickillo was invited to the NFL Scouting Combine and was able to participate in the full workout and complete all the positional drills. He also attended Miami's Pro Day but was satisfied with his combine performance and only did positional workouts.

External videos
- Anthony Chickillo's NFL Combine Workout

Pre-draft measurables
Height	Weight	Arm length	Hand span	Wingspan	40-yard dash	10-yard split	20-yard split	20-yard shuttle	Three-cone drill	Vertical jump	Broad jump	Bench press
6 ft 3 1/8 in (1.91 m)	267 lb (121 kg)	33 1/2 in (0.85 m)	10 1/8 in (0.26 m)	6 ft 8 3/8 in (2.04 m)	4.79 s	1.66 s	2.77 s	4.25 s	7.17 s	34.5 in (0.88 m)	9 ft 6 in (2.90 m)	27 reps
All values from NFL Combine

=== Pittsburgh Steelers ===
==== 2015 ====
On May 2, 2015, Chickillo was selected by the Pittsburgh Steelers in the sixth round (212th overall) of the 2015 NFL draft. Chickillo was the 24th defensive end drafted in 2015. On May 11, 2015, the Steelers signed Chickillo to a four-year, $2.37 million contract that includes a signing bonus of $73,700.

External videos
- Steelers draft Anthony Chickillo 212th overall

On September 6, 2015, he was waived by the Steelers after initially making the 53-man roster. He was signed to the practice squad three days later. On September 30, 2015, Chickillo was activated from the practice squad to the Steelers' active roster.

On October 18, 2015, he appeared in his first career game against the Arizona Cardinals. He appeared in seven regular-season games for the Steelers in his rookie year, recording six tackles and forcing a fumble. The following week, he recorded his first tackle during a 23–13 loss to the Kansas City Chiefs. He had a season-high two tackles and forced a fumble during the Steelers' Week 17 victory over the Cleveland Browns. Chickillo finished his rookie season with a total of six combined tackles and a forced fumble, while appearing in seven regular-season contests and two postseason games.

==== 2016 ====
He began his second season as the third left outside linebacker on the depth chart behind Bud Dupree and Arthur Moats. Although he was mainly featured on special teams, he began to receive more reps as a rotational outside linebacker after Dupree missed the first ten games due to an abdominal injury.

On October 9, 2016, Chickillo recorded three solo tackles, a forced fumble, and his first career sack on New York Jets' quarterback Ryan Fitzpatrick, during the Steelers' 31–13 victory. The following week, he earned his first career start against the Miami Dolphins and finished the loss with three solo tackles. During a Week 9 13–21 loss to the Baltimore Ravens, Chickillo made a season-high six combined tackles and was credited with a half a sack on Joe Flacco. The next game, he made a total of four tackles, forced a fumble, and sacked Dak Prescott during a 30–35 loss to the Dallas Cowboys.

==== 2017 ====
On February 14, 2017, the Steelers signed Chickillo to a one-year, $615,000 restricted free agent tender. He returned as the Steelers' third left outside linebacker behind Dupree and Moats, but began the regular season featured on special teams.

On September 10, in the season-opening 21–18 victory over the Cleveland Browns, Chickillo had two sacks. In addition, Tyler Matakevich blocked a punt, which Chickillo recovered in the end zone for his first career touchdown and gave the Steelers their first points of the season.

==== 2018 ====
On March 13, 2018, the Steelers extended an original round tender offer to Chickillo as a restricted free agent. On April 21, 2018, Chickillo officially signed his one-year, $1.90 million contract.

==== 2019 ====
On March 12, 2019, Chickillo signed a two-year, $8 million contract extension with the Steelers. After he was arrested for domestic violence on October 20, 2019, he was placed on the exempt/commissioner's permission list on October 23, 2019. The domestic violence charges were withdrawn on October 30, and he was brought back to the active roster on October 31. On March 16, 2020, Chickillo was released.

=== New Orleans Saints ===
On May 26, 2020, Chickillo signed with the New Orleans Saints. He was released on September 5, 2020, and signed to the practice squad the next day.

=== Denver Broncos ===
On September 18, 2020, the Denver Broncos signed Chickillo off the Saints' practice squad. In Week 6 against the New England Patriots, Chickillo recorded his first sack as a Bronco on Cam Newton during the 18–12 win.

Chickillo announced his retirement from professional football on July 11, 2021.

== NFL career statistics ==
Legend
**Bold**	Career high

Year	Team	Games		Tackles					Interceptions					Fumbles			
Year	Team	GP	GS	Cmb	Solo	Ast	Sck	TFL	Int	Yds	TD	Lng	PD	FF	FR	Yds	TD
2015	PIT	7	0	6	4	2	0.0	0	0	0	0	0	0	1	1	0	0
2016	PIT	15	**7**	**29**	**21**	8	2.5	**5**	0	0	0	0	0	**2**	0	0	0
2017	PIT	**16**	2	19	13	6	**3.0**	2	0	0	0	0	1	0	0	0	0
2018	PIT	**16**	0	24	12	**12**	1.5	4	0	0	0	0	**2**	0	**2**	0	0
2019	PIT	11	0	19	9	10	0.5	0	0	0	0	0	0	0	0	0	0
2020	DEN	11	0	11	7	4	1.0	1	0	0	0	0	1	0	0	0	0
Career		76	9	108	66	42	8.5	12	0	0	0	0	4	3	3	0	0

== Personal life ==
His father Tony Chickillo and grandfather Nick Chickillo both played at the University of Miami and in the NFL.

He was previously in a relationship with Alysha Newman. He is now married to Tatu Baby.
