= West Scranton High School =

Coordinates: 41.4094°N 75.688°W

Location
- 1201 Luzerne Street; Scranton, Pennsylvania 18504; United States

Information
- School type: Public high school
- Established: 1935
- School district: Scranton School District
- Principal: Renee Stevens
- Staff: 103.04 (FTE)
- Grades: 9-12
- Enrollment: 1,401 (2022-2023)
- Student to teacher ratio: 13.60
- Campus type: Urban
- Colors: Blue and white
- Mascot: Invader
- Information: 570-348-3616
- Website: Official website

West Scranton High School, is a community-based school in the west side neighborhood of Scranton, Pennsylvania. It is one of the oldest schools in the area, having opened to the public in 1935, first as a junior high facility and later as a high school. It offers about 23 clubs and 11 sports, and hosts grades 9 through 12. Renée Stevens is the school's current principal. The school colors are royal blue and white and the mascot is the Invader. It is a public school enrolling approximately 1,000 students, with an average of about 250 students in each grade.

== Extracurriculars ==
Scranton School District offers a variety of clubs, activities, and sports.

=== Clubs ===
- Art Club
- Aspiring Educator Pathway Project
- Chess Club
- Community Service Club
- Drama Club
- Exceptional Children's Aide Club
- French Club
- Gaming Club
- Gay-Straight Alliance
- Health Careers Club
- Invader Tv
- Journalism/ Newspaper Club
- Latin Club
- Literary Magazine
- National Art Honor Society
- National Honor Society
- Pennsylvania Junior Academy of Science
- Pride Team
- Red Cross Club
- SADD/SAVE
- Speech and Debate Team
- Spirit Club

=== Sports ===
- Baseball
- Basketball (boys' and girls')
- Cheerleading (football and basketball)
- Cross country
- Football- Coached by Jake Manetti
- Golf
- Soccer (boys' and girls')
- Softball
- Swimming and diving
- Tennis (boys' and girls')
- Track and field
- Wrestling

The school's biggest athletic rival is the Scranton High School Knights, who share a football stadium - Memorial Stadium, located outside Scranton High School - with the Invaders. Each year, the two teams meet in "The Bell Game," usually in early October. The winner of the football game takes a locomotive bell, to remain in the victor's school until the following meeting.

== Notable alumni ==
- Nick Chickillo, former professional football player, Chicago Cardinals
- Carrie DelRosso, businesswoman
- Bill Ferrario, former professional football player, Green Bay Packers
- Cosmo Iacavazzi, former professional football player, New York Jets, and member of College Football Hall of Fame
- Don Jonas, former professional football player, Philadelphia Eagles
- Kathleen Kane, former Pennsylvania Attorney General convicted of felony perjury and subsequently disbarred and sentence to jail time
- Matt McGloin, former professional football player, Houston Texans and Oakland Raiders
- Marc Spindler, former professional football player, Detroit Lions and New York Jets
- Tyra Vaughn, former film actress and showgirl
