= Judy McGrath =

American television executive

- Born: Scranton, Pennsylvania
- Education: Cedar Crest College
- Occupation: Television executive
- Years active: 2004 - present

Judith Ann McGrath is an American television executive.

== Career ==
During the early period of her professional life, McGrath contributed articles to magazines produced by Conde Nast Publications, and was the copy chief at Glamour magazine and a senior writer for Mademoiselle. She was then hired by MTV. In 2004, McGrath was named chair and chief executive officer of MTV Networks, where she was responsible for management of the networks' channels, including MTV, MTV2, VH1, Comedy Central, Nickelodeon, TV Land, and Logo.

In 2009, she was named the 62nd most powerful woman in the world by Forbes. She stepped down from her position on May 5, 2011.

In 2013, in partnership with Sony Music, McGrath launched a mobile video startup, Astronauts Wanted: 'No Experience Necessary'.

In 2014, McGrath joined the board of directors of Amazon. She chose not to pursue re-election to that position and stepped down in April 2024.
