= Nick Chickillo =

American football player (1930–2000)

No. 68
- Positions: Linebacker, guard

Personal information
- Born: October 17, 1930; Scranton, Pennsylvania, U.S.
- Died: February 5, 2000 (aged 69)
- Listed height: 5 ft 11 in (1.80 m)
- Listed weight: 220 lb (100 kg)

Career information
- High school: West Scranton
- College: Miami (FL) (1949–1952)
- NFL draft: 1953: 15th round, 172nd overall pick

Career history
- Chicago Cardinals (1953); Pittsburgh Steelers (1954)*
- * Offseason or practice squad member only

Career NFL statistics
- Games played: 12
- Games started: 9
- Fumble recoveries: 2
- Stats at Pro Football Reference

Nicholas Angelo Chickillo (October 17, 1930 – February 5, 2000) was an American professional football player who played one season with the Chicago Cardinals of the National Football League (NFL). He was selected by the Cardinals in the fifteenth round of the 1953 NFL draft after playing college football at the University of Miami.

== Early life and college ==
Nicholas Angelo Chickillo was born on October 17, 1930, in Scranton, Pennsylvania. He attended West Scranton High School in Scranton.

Chickillo was a member of the Miami Hurricanes from 1949 to 1952 and a three-year starter from 1950 to 1952. He was inducted into the school's athletics hall of fame in 1987. His hall of fame bio notes that "Chickillo was one of the truly great 60-minute men in Hurricane football history. Chickillo was a stand-out player on both the offensive and defensive line while playing in the glory days of the early 1950's."

== Professional career ==
Chickillo was selected by the Chicago Cardinals in the 15th round, with the 173rd overall pick, of the 1953 NFL draft. He played in all 12 games, starting nine, for the Cardinals during the 1953 season and recovered two fumbles.

On September 9, 1954, Chickillo was traded to the Pittsburgh Steelers for a 20th round pick in the 1955 NFL draft, conditional on if Chickillo remained with the Steelers through the first six games of the regular season. He was released by the Steelers on September 21, 1954. Chickillo's trade to the Steelers and quick release were met with surprise by the media. It was later revealed that Chickillo had informed the Cardinals he would be joining the United States Army in 1955.

== Personal life ==
Football players Tony Chickillo and Anthony Chickillo are his son and grandson, respectively. Nick served in the United States Army. He died on February 5, 2000.
