= Maybelle Goodlander =

American photographer

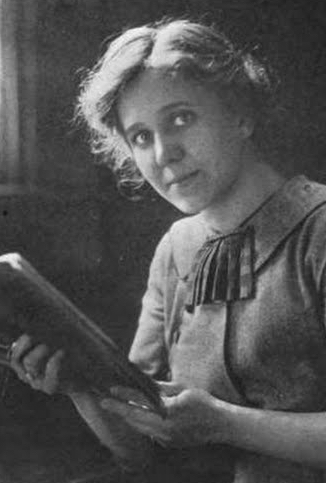
- Maybelle Goodlander, from a 1912 publication
- Born: Maybelle Deane Goodlander; May 25, 1882; Muncie, Indiana, U.S.
- Died: October 25, 1959 (aged 77); Muncie, Indiana, U.S.
- Burial place: Maplewood Cemetery; 40.11560°N 85.66440°W
- Occupation: Photographer
- Years active: 1906–1959
- Organization(s): Women's Federation of the Photographers' Association of America; Business and Professional Women's Association of Muncie
- Style: Portraits

Maybelle D. Goodlander (May 25, 1882 – October 25, 1959) was an American commercial and portrait photographer based in Muncie, Indiana, in partnership with her older sister Maude Goodlander.

== Early life ==
Maude and Maybelle Goodlander were born in Muncie, Indiana, the daughters of Marquis D. Goodlander and Harriett Chapel Goodlander. Their father was a photographer, and taught his daughters the skills of the profession.

== Career ==
By 1906 the Goodlander sisters were working together as professional photographers, and they took over their father's studio when he retired. They made photographic portraits and painted portraits on canvas. They also took class pictures for schools. They also held an exhibit of German photography in Muncie, in 1911, featuring work by Minya Diez-Dührkoop.

Maybelle Goodlander was elected president of the Women's Federation of the Photographers' Association of America in 1915. She attended national meetings of the Photographers' Association of America in Milwaukee (1910), St. Paul (1911), Detroit (1912), Kansas City, Missouri (1913), Atlanta (1914), and Indianapolis (1915). She was president of the Business and Professional Women's Association of Muncie in 1927. She spoke about photography at the national convention of Business and Professional Women's Clubs in Oakland, California in 1927.

== Personal life ==
Maybelle D. Goodlander died in 1959, aged 77 years. Maude died in 1962.
