= Woodlawn Memorial Park (Compton, California) =

Historic cemetery in Los Angeles County, California

- Interactive map of Woodlawn Memorial Park

Details
- Established: c. 1869 – c. 1871
- Location: 1715 West Greenleaf Blvd., Compton, California, United States
- Coordinates: 33.88127°N 118.24688°W
- No. of graves: about 26,800
- Website: woodlawncelestialgardens.com
- Find a Grave: Woodlawn Memorial Park

Woodlawn Memorial Park, is a historic cemetery in Compton, California, United States. It is one of the oldest cemeteries in Los Angeles County. The cemetery has had a history of care issues in the last 20 years, and since 2020 Woodlawn Memorial Park is only open for visitation. It has also been known as Compton Rural Cemetery, and Woodlawn Celestial Gardens.

== History ==
It was founded in c. 1869 – c. 1871 under the name Compton Rural Cemetery. It contains some 26,800 graves; and some 900 veterans graves, including seventeen veterans of the American Civil War from the Union Army (all unidentified), veterans of War of 1812, and veterans of the Gulf War.

=== 21st century ===
In 2000, the cemetery was temporarily closed after they found pieces of human bones on the grounds, after graves were combined. The cemetery owner at the time paid a fine to avoid criminal prosecution.

In 2011, Ruben Suarez took over the ownership of Woodlawn Memorial Park. In 2019, the cemetery was closed and locked to the public and appeared to be disheveled. By January 2020, Suarez surrendered the cemetery license after the property taxes went unpaid, the water was turned off, the grounds were not cared for, and graves were no longer marked. Cemeteries are required to hold state licensing in order to continue burials, and license approval is from the Cemetery and Funeral Bureau.

In 2021, Celestina Bishop, whose family is buried at the cemetery, made an effort to organize hundreds of volunteers and clean up the grounds. Bishop and her husband Marvis Jackson formed One Section At A Time (OSAAT), a nonprofit associated with cemetery clean up. In February 2022, Bishop became the proprietor of the cemetery, and it was renamed Woodlawn Celestial Gardens. In January 2024, a large sum of graves were vandalized, and thieves stole the metal and copper off of the gravestones, and lawn care equipment.

== Notable burials ==
- Bunchy Carter (1942–1969), American activist; founding member of the Southern California chapter of the Black Panther Party.
- Griffith Dickenson Compton (1820–1905), American farmer, early pioneer, and Compton city founder.
- Freeman Davis ("Brother Bones"; 1902–1974), American whistling and bone playing recording artist
- Theolic Smith ("Fireball"; 1913–1981), American Negro league pitcher in the 1930s and 1940s.
- Francis Everett Townsend (1867–1960), American physician and political activist; devised the Townsend Plan.
- Frederic Gregg “Fritz” Truran (1915–1945), American rodeo performer, and United States Marine Corps serving in World War II.

== See also ==
- List of cemeteries in California
