= Stephen Wheeler Downey =

American politician

Stephen W. Downey
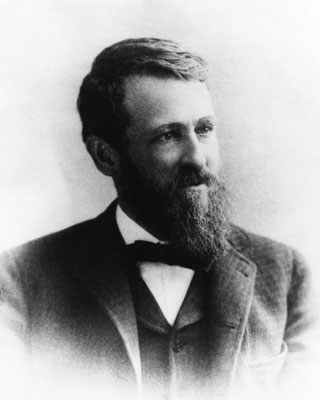

Member of the U.S. House of Representatives from Wyoming Territory's at-large district
- In office March 4, 1879 – March 3, 1881 (Delegate)
- Preceded by: William Wellington Corlett
- Succeeded by: Morton Everel Post

Member of the Wyoming House of Representatives
- In office 1893; 1895

Wyoming Territory Auditor
- In office December 17, 1877 – March 3, 1879
- Preceded by: Orlando North
- Succeeded by: J. S. Nason

Wyoming Territory Treasurer
- In office October 26, 1872 – December 11, 1875
- Preceded by: John W. Donnellan
- Succeeded by: Amasa R. Converse

Personal details
- Born: July 25, 1839 Westernport, Maryland
- Died: August 3, 1902 (aged 63) Albany County, Wyoming
- Party: Republican
- Spouse(s): Fannie Fisher. Fannie (died 1870); Evangeline Victoria Owen (died 1937)
- Children: 12 (including Sheridan Downey and Dr. June Etta Downey
- Profession: Attorney

Military service
- Allegiance: United States
- Branch/service: United States Army; Union Army
- Years of service: 1861–1862
- Rank: Colonel
- Unit: 3rd Maryland Infantry, Potomac Home Brigade
- Battles/wars: Civil War: Battle of Harpers Ferry

Stephen Wheeler Downey (July 25, 1839 – August 3, 1902) was a lawyer and politician in Wyoming. A Union Army veteran of the American Civil War, he was an early white settler of Wyoming, and served as its treasurer, auditor, and delegate to Congress. After statehood, Downey continued to serve in local and state office, including Speaker of the Wyoming House of Representatives.

Downey was a founder of the University of Wyoming, and the longtime president of its board of trustees.

== Early life ==
Downey was born in Westernport, Maryland on July 25, 1839, a son of Owen Dorsey Downey and Elizabeth L. (Powell) Downey. He was educated locally, and studied law with Francis Thomas of Cumberland, Maryland in preparation for a career as an attorney.

== Military career ==
On 31 October 1861, Downey enlisted in the Union Army for the American Civil War, joining 3rd Maryland Infantry Regiment, Potomac Home Brigade as a private. He was promoted to first lieutenant in January 1862, lieutenant colonel in March 1862, and colonel in September 1862. In March 1862, Downey was in command of Union troops in Romney, Virginia (now West Virginia). By May his regiment was serving as part of Christopher C. Augur Division, Nathaniel P. Banks' Army Corps.

When the Maryland campaign began in early September 1862, Downey commanded the post at Kearneysville, Virginia (then West Virginia). On September 10, he was in command of a reconnaissance patrol from the 1st Maryland Cavalry Battalion, Potomac Home Brigade. Near Boonsboro, Maryland, Downey's patrol encountered Confederate commander Stonewall Jackson and his staff riding in advance of their troops on the Sharpsburg Road. Jackson fled, his escort skirmished with Downey's troops, and Downey was wounded.

Downey and his command were captured with the Union garrison at the Battle of Harpers Ferry on September 15. As a result of his wounds, Downey was discharged from the army in November 1862.

== Move to Wyoming ==
After leaving the army, Downey attained admission to the bar and established a law practice in Washington, D.C. In 1869, he moved to the Territory of Wyoming and established a law practice in Laramie. A Republican, Downey served as the prosecuting attorney of Albany County, Wyoming in 1869 and 1870. He also opened a survey office in Laramie and was assigned to six government survey contracts between 1870 and 1873. He served as a member of the Wyoming Territorial Council in 1871, 1875, and 1877. Downey was territorial treasurer 1872 to 1875, and territorial auditor from 1877 to 1879.

== Congressional delegate ==
In 1878, Downey was elected as Wyoming's Delegate to the United States House of Representatives. He served one term, March 4, 1879 to March 3, 1881, and did not run for another term in 1880.

During his congressional term, Downey earned nationwide headlines after he proposed legislation that would have declared the United States to be "a Christian people" and appropriated $500,000 (about $14.5 million in 2022) to create and install Christian-themed paintings and other artwork in federal buildings. Press coverage of Downey's unsuccessful bill began after he obtained permission to have printed in the record his remarks in favor of his proposed law, which was revealed to be a 15 page prose poem, Argument of Hon. Stephen W. Downey. After realizing Downey's text was copyrighted, Republican floor leader James A. Garfield persuaded a majority of the House that the body's rules prohibited printing copyrighted works, and they voted against allowing Downey's poem into the record.

== Later career ==
After leaving Congress, Downey resumed practicing law in Laramie. He served in the territorial House of Representatives in 1886 and 1890, was a member of the state constitutional convention in 1889. In 1886, Downey sponsored the bill that created the University of Wyoming and became known as "The Father of the University of Wyoming". From 1891 to 1897 he was a university trustee member, and he was the longtime president of the board of trustees.

Wyoming achieved statehood in 1890, and Downey was a member of the Wyoming House of Representatives in 1893 and 1895. In 1895, he served as chair of the Judiciary Committee and Speaker pro tempore. From 1897 until his death he served as prosecuting attorney for Albany County. Downey died in Denver, Colorado on August 14, 1902. He was buried at Greenhill Cemetery in Laramie.

== Family ==
Downey had two daughters with his first wife, Fannie Fisher who died in 1870, not long after the family moved to Laramie, Wyoming.

Downey married Evangeline Victoria Owen (1853–1937) in Laramie, Wyoming in 1872 and they had ten children. His son, Sheridan Downey (1884–1961), became a lawyer and United States Senator from California. His daughter, Dr. June Etta Downey (1875–1932), became a prominent psychologist, and a professor of psychology and philosophy at the University of Wyoming.

The Downey Family Papers (1866–1997) are located at the University of Wyoming's American Heritage Center Archives.

U.S. House of Representatives
Preceded by William Wellington Corlett	Delegate from Wyoming Territory's at-large congressional district March 4, 1879 – March 3, 1881	Succeeded by Morton Everel Post
