= Reagan coalition =

1980s United States Republican Party political coalition

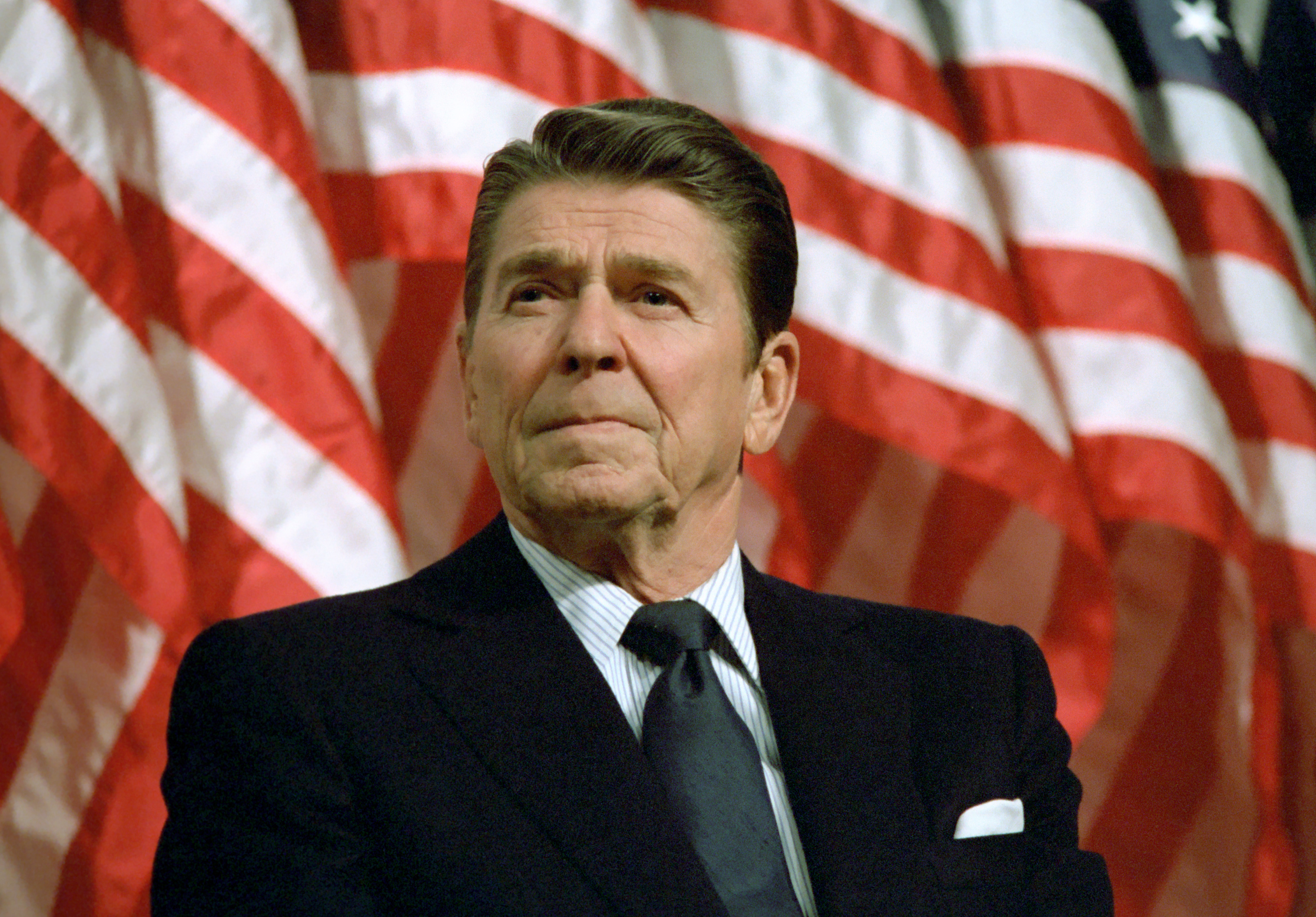
Reagan campaigning for David Durenberger in the 1982 U.S. Senate election in Minnesota

The Reagan coalition was the combination of voters that Republican Ronald Reagan assembled to produce a major political realignment with his electoral landslide in the 1980 United States presidential election. The coalition was possible because of Democrat Jimmy Carter's losses in most socio-economic groups. In 1984, Reagan confirmed his support by winning nearly 60% of the popular vote and carrying 49 of the 50 states.

The Reagan Democrats were members of the Democratic Party before and after the Reagan presidency, but voted for Reagan in 1980 and 1984 and for his vice president, George H. W. Bush, in 1988, producing their landslide victories. They were mostly white socially conservative blue-collar workers who lived in the Northeast and were attracted to Reagan's social conservatism on issues such as abortion and to his anti-communist hawkish foreign policy. They did not continue to vote Republican in 1992 or 1996, causing the term to fall into disuse except as a reference to the 1980s. The term is not generally used to describe the white Southerners who permanently changed party affiliation from Democrat to Republican during Reagan's presidency. They have largely remained Republican to this day.

Democratic pollster Stan Greenberg analyzed white, largely unionized auto workers in suburban Macomb County, Michigan, just north of Detroit. The county voted 63% for John F. Kennedy in the 1960 presidential election and 66% for Reagan in 1984. He concluded that Reagan Democrats no longer saw Democrats as champions of their middle class aspirations. They instead viewed the Democratic Party as working primarily for the benefit of others, especially African Americans and the very poor.

The Reagan coalition began to fall apart after 1988 when Reagan was ineligible for reelection and Bush won over Democrat Michael Dukakis. Bush lost over 5 million votes and 100 electoral votes in comparison to what Reagan won four years prior. In 1992, Bush faced a competitive primary competition with Pat Buchanan, still winning the Republican nomination with 72% of the vote. Bush went on to lose the general election against Democrat Bill Clinton, with exit polling showing Bush retaining 66% of the Republican vote, Clinton winning 12%, and independent candidate Ross Perot winning 21%. In 1996, Republican Bob Dole lost to Clinton, taking 68% of the Republican vote, improving on Bush's margin, while Clinton took 23% and Perot 7%.

== Voter demographics ==
1980 and 1976 voter groups and presidential votes
% of the total 1980 vote	Group	Carter (1980)	Reagan (1980)	Anderson (1980)	Carter (1976)	Ford (1976)
	Party					
43	Democratic	65	26	6	77	22
23	Independent	30	54	12	43	54
28	Republican	11	84	4	9	90
	Ideology					
18	Liberal	57	27	11	70	26
51	Moderate	42	48	8	51	48
31	Conservative	23	71	4	29	70
	Race					
10	Black	82	14	3	82	16
2	Hispanic	54	36	7	75	24
88	White	36	55	8	47	52
	Sex					
48	Female	45	46	7	50	48
52	Male	37	54	7	50	48
	Religion					
46	Protestant	37	56	6	44	55
41	White Protestant	31	62	6	43	57
25	Catholic	40	51	7	54	44
5	Jewish	45	39	14	64	34
	Family income					
13	Less than $10,000	50	41	6	58	40
15	$10,000–$14,999	47	42	8	55	43
29	$15,000–$24,999	38	53	7	48	50
24	$25,000–$50,000	32	58	8	36	62
5	Over $50,000	25	65	8	—	—
	Occupation					
39	Professional or manager	33	56	9	41	57
11	Clerical, sales, white collar	42	48	8	46	53
17	Blue-collar	46	47	5	57	41
3	Agriculture	29	66	3	—	—
3	Unemployed	55	35	7	65	34
	Education					
11	Less than high school	50	45	3	58	41
28	High school graduate	43	51	4	54	46
28	Some college	35	55	8	51	49
27	College graduate	35	51	11	45	55
	Union membership					
28	Labor union household	47	44	7	59	39
62	No member of household in union	35	55	8	43	55
	Age					
6	18–21 years old	44	43	11	48	50
17	22–29 years old	43	43	11	51	46
31	30–44 years old	37	54	7	49	49
23	45–59 years old	39	55	6	47	52
18	60 years or older	40	54	4	47	52
	Region					
25	East	42	47	9	51	47
27	South	44	51	3	54	45
22	South (whites)	35	60	3	46	52
27	Midwest	40	51	7	48	50
19	Far West	35	53	9	46	51
	Community size					
18	City over 250,000	54	35	8	60	40
53	Suburb/small city	37	53	8	53	47
29	Rural/town	39	54	5	47	53

== The Three Leg Stool ==
"The Three Legged Stool of the Republican Party", also known by "The Gipper's Stool" or "Reagan's Stool", is a theory about the composition of the U.S. Republican Party. It is intended to explain the way the Republican Party's power base derives from the three main "legs" (factions) within the "stool", those being the Christian right/social conservatives, fiscal conservatives, and anti-communist foreign interventionists. This coalition came together with the rise of the New Right and the election of Ronald Reagan.

Variants of the phrase are often used interchangeably, such as "Gipper's Stool" or "Reagan's Stool". Ronald Reagan coined the term as a way to describe the Republican party as a three-part coalition based on the social conservatives (consisting of the Christian right and paleo-conservatives), war hawks (consisting of interventionists and neoconservatives), and fiscal conservatives (consisting of right-libertarians and free-market capitalists), with overlap between the sides. The "legs" of the analogy describe each part of the coalition, the idea being that without all three the party cannot win (as a stool cannot support itself with only two legs).

During the election of 1980, Ronald Reagan described the party as a three-legged stool, most combining their different brands of conservatism in opposition to the Soviet Union and the spread of Communism during the Cold War. This political philosophy is often branded as fusionism as both groups have overlapping interests as Libertarian philosopher Frank Meyer, as both shared values and most importantly enemies. During the 2007 Iowa caucuses, Mitt Romney carried a physical three-legged stool, explaining the importance of each leg. He also stated in terms of the importance of the legs as being "our candidate has to be somebody who can represent and speak for all three legs of the conservative stool or conservative coalition that Ronald Reagan put together — social conservatives, economic conservatives, and defense conservatives", and without it the party would fail.

Critics often use the stool as a means to criticize party leadership or another member of the stool, such is seen in the lament of the "death of the stool" with the 2016 election of Donald Trump. Pundits often criticize party membership for abandoning the stool, as Business Insider reported, "the person said that thanks mostly to President George W. Bush, the party has failed on the first two legs. The country has shifted significantly over the last one, and there's nothing a Republican candidate can do to change it." Senator Spencer Abraham has also criticized the stool, saying, "The Republican party has much greater divides now in terms of the feelings of its voters than it did when Reagan ran."

== See also ==
- Conservative coalition
- New Deal coalition
- Obama coalition
