= 1938 United States Senate election in California =

- November 8, 1938
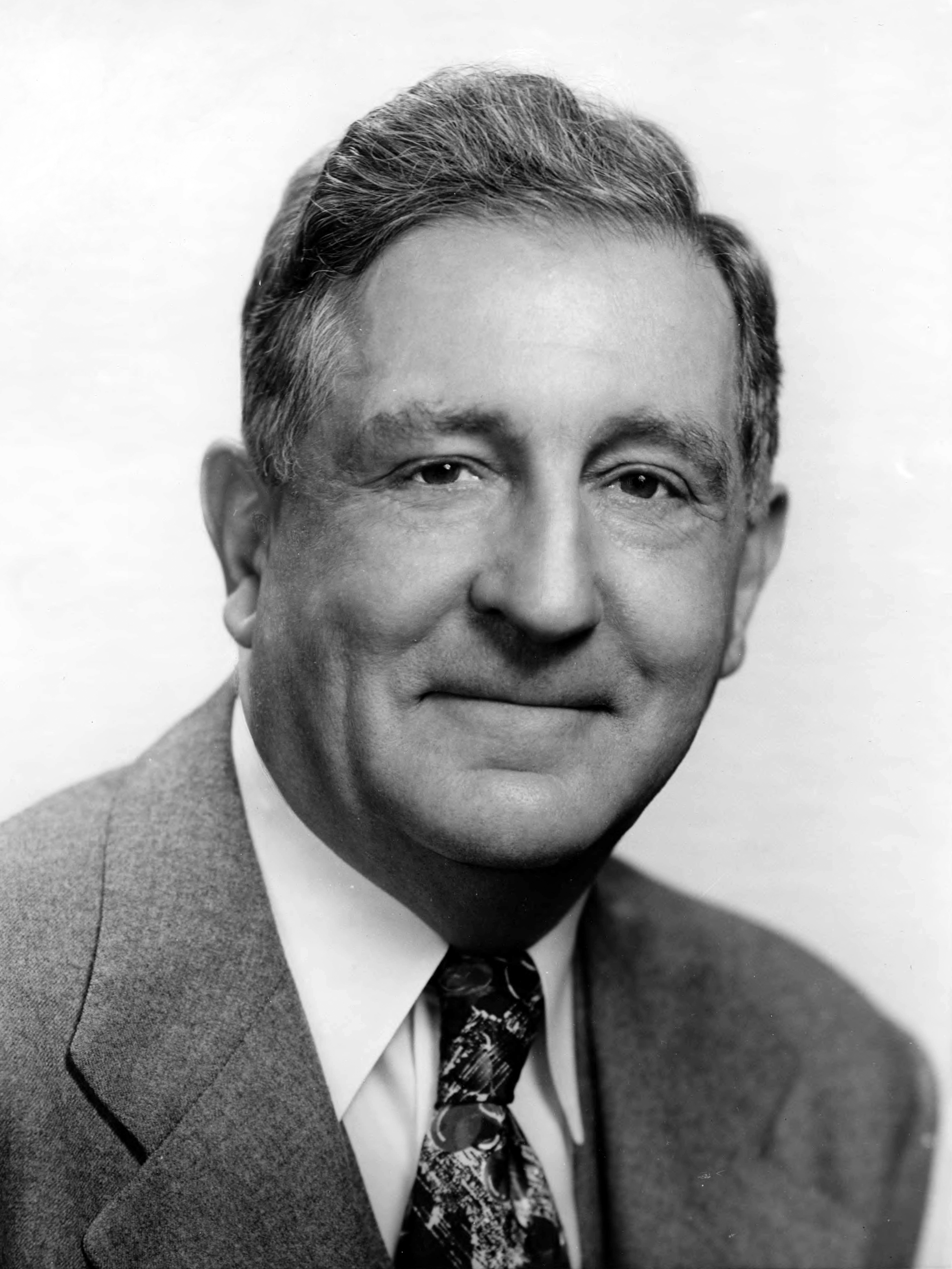

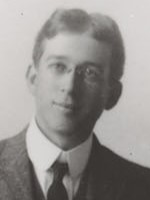
Nominee	Sheridan Downey	Philip Bancroft
Party	Democratic	Republican
Alliance	Progressive; Townsend
Popular vote	1,372,314	1,126,240
Percentage	54.43%	44.67%
- County results Downey: 40–50% 50–60% 60–70% Bancroft: 40–50% 50–60% 70–80%
U.S. senator before election
William Gibbs McAdoo
Democratic
Elected U.S. Senator
Sheridan Downey
Democratic

The 1938 United States Senate election in California was held on November 2, 1938. Democratic incumbent William Gibbs McAdoo ran for re-election to a second term but was defeated by Sheridan Downey in the Democratic primary. In the general election, Downey defeated Philip Bancroft.

== Democratic primary ==
=== Candidates ===
- Sheridan Downey, leader in the End Poverty in California movement and nominee for lieutenant governor in 1934
- William Gibbs McAdoo, incumbent U.S. senator since 1933
- James W. Mellen
- John W. Preston, former associate justice of the Supreme Court of California
- Ray Riley, state controller since 1921 (cross-filing)

=== Campaign ===
Senator McAdoo had the support of President Franklin Roosevelt and George Creel.

Downey was supported by his 1934 running mate Upton Sinclair and pensioner advocate Francis Townsend.

The primary issue of the Democratic primary was the Ham and Eggs movement, a proposal which advocated for the payment of $30 every week to unemployed Californians aged 50 or older. The movement was supported by Downey and other EPIC allies. McAdoo, on the other hand, opposed it, arguing it was fiscally irresponsible.

=== Results ===
1938 Democratic Senate primary
Party	Candidate	Votes	%
Democratic	Sheridan Downey	511,952	46.05%
Democratic	William Gibbs McAdoo (incumbent)	375,930	33.82%
Republican	Ray Riley (cross-filing)	103,748	9.33%
Democratic	John W. Preston	95,547	8.60%
Democratic	James W. Mellen	24,467	2.20%
Total votes		1,111,644	100.00%

== Republican primary ==
=== Candidates ===
- Philip Bancroft, founding member of the Bull Moose Party
- Ray Riley, state controller since 1921
- Louise Ward Watkins, community activist from Pasadena

=== Results ===
Although he did not cross-file to appear on the ballot, Sheridan Downey did receive write-in votes.

1938 Republican Senate primary
Party	Candidate	Votes	%
Republican	Philip Bancroft	295,751	44.86%
Republican	Ray L. Riley	292,940	44.43%
Republican	Louise Ward Watkins	54,248	8.23%
Democratic	Sheridan Downey (write-in)	16,360	2.48%
Total votes		659,299	100.00%

== Progressive primary ==
=== Candidates ===
- Paul H. Bruns
- Sheridan Downey, leader in the End Poverty in California movement and Democratic nominee for lieutenant governor in 1934 (cross-filing)
- Ray Riley, state controller since 1921 (cross-filing)

=== Results ===
1938 Progressive Senate primary
Party	Candidate	Votes	%
Democratic	Sheridan Downey (cross-filing)	4,507	64.04%
Republican	Ray L. Riley (cross-filing)	1,552	22.05%
California Progressive Party	Paul H. Bruns	939	13.91%
Total votes		659,299	100.00%

== Townsend Party primary ==
=== Candidates ===
- Sheridan Downey, leader in the End Poverty in California movement and Democratic nominee for lieutenant governor in 1934 (cross-filing)
- Ray Riley, state controller since 1921 (cross-filing)

=== Results ===
1938 Townsendite Party Senate primary
Party	Candidate	Votes	%
Democratic	Sheridan Downey (cross-filing)	14,132	91.39%
Republican	Ray L. Riley (cross-filing)	7,038	8.61%
Total votes		15,463	100.00%

== General election ==
=== Candidates ===
- Philip Bancroft, founding member of the Bull Moose Party (Republican)
- Lilian S. Clemente (Socialist)
- Sheridan Downey, leader in the End Poverty in California movement and candidate for lieutenant governor in 1934 (Democratic)

=== Results ===
1938 United States Senate election in California
Party	Candidate	Votes	%
Democratic	Sheridan Downey	1,372,314	54.43%
Republican	Philip Bancroft	1,126,240	44.67%
Socialist	Lillian S. Clemente	22,569	0.90%
Total votes		2,521,123	100.00%

== See also ==
- 1938 United States Senate elections
