= Joseph Stickels =

American Medal of Honor recipient

Sergeant Joseph Stickels
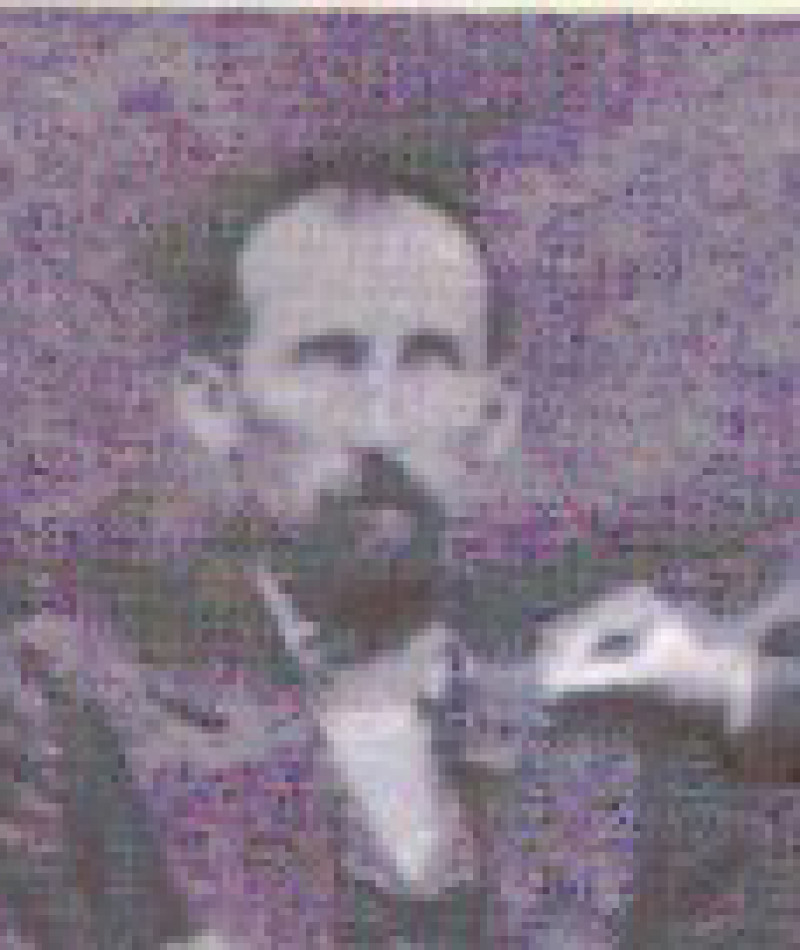
- Born: 15 November 1843; Butler County, Ohio
- Died: 6 December 1876 (aged 33); Quincy, Illinois
- Burial place: Monroe Cemetery, Monroe, Iowa
- Military career
- Allegiance: United States; Union
- Branch: United States Army; Union Army
- Service years: 1861-1865
- Rank: Sergeant
- Units: Company A, 83rd Ohio Infantry
- Conflicts: Battle of Fort Blakeley
- Awards: Medal of Honor

Joseph Stickels (15 November 1843 - 6 December 1876) was a sergeant in the United States Army who was awarded the Medal of Honor for gallantry in the American Civil War. He was awarded the medal on 9 April 1865 for actions performed during the Battle of Fort Blakeley in Alabama between 2 and 9 April 1865.

== Personal life ==
Stickels was born on 15 November 1843 in Butler County, Ohio. He married Theresa Jane Meredith Townsend in 1867. He died on 6 December 1873 in Quincy, Illinois of tuberculosis and was buried in Monroe Cemetery in Monroe, Iowa.

== Military service ==
On 9 April 1865, Stickels captured an unspecified flag during the Battle of Fort Blakeley.

Stickels' Medal of Honor citation reads:

The President of the United States of America, in the name of Congress, takes pleasure in presenting the Medal of Honor to Sergeant Joseph Stickels, United States Army, for extraordinary heroism on 9 April 1865, while serving with Company A, 83d Ohio Infantry, in action at Fort Blakely, Alabama, for capture of flag.

— E. M. Stanton, Secretary of War

Stickels' medal is attributed to Ohio.
