= June Downey =

American psychologist (1875–1932)

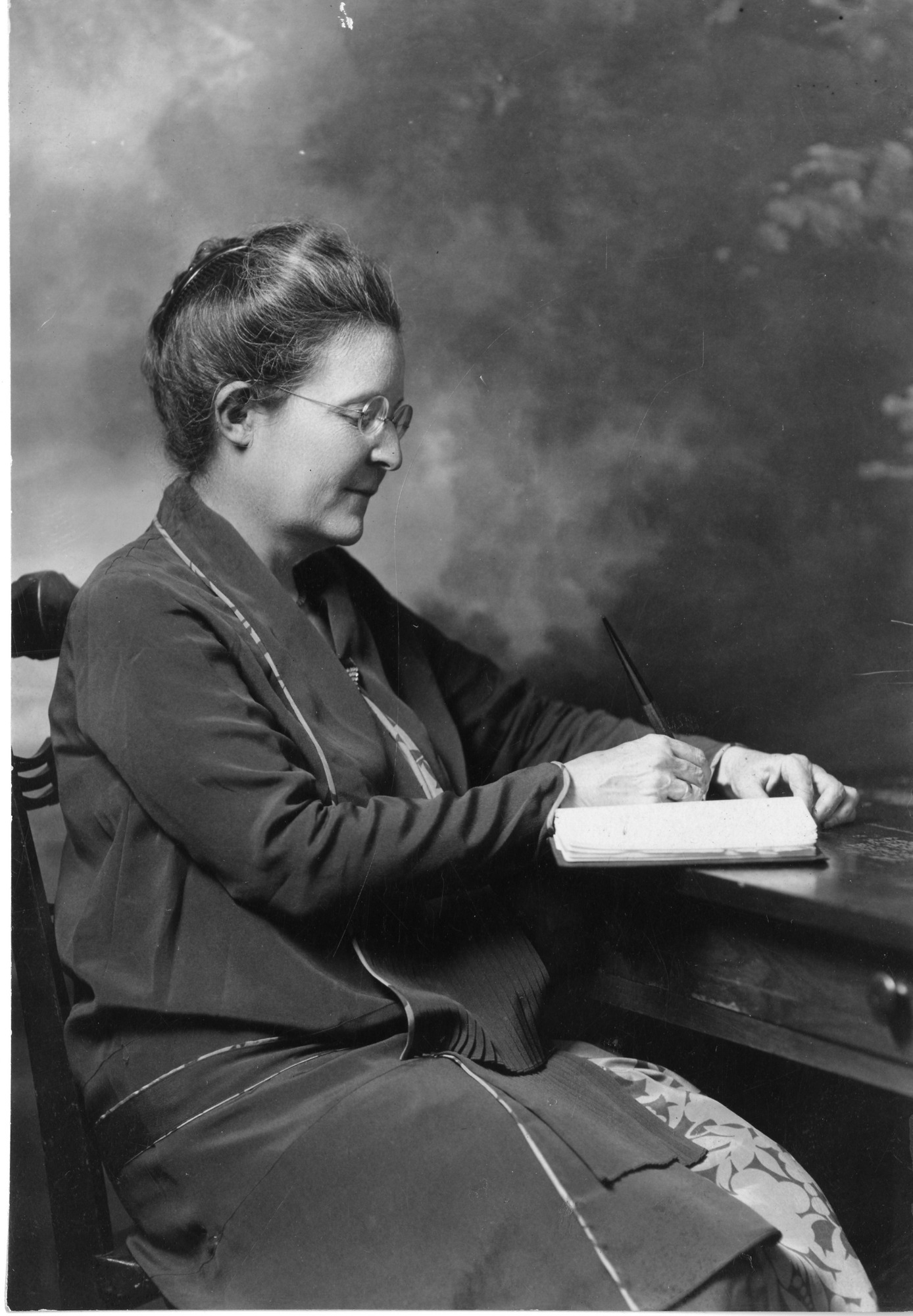
- Born: July 13, 1875; Laramie, Wyoming
- Died: October 11, 1932 (aged 57); Trenton, New Jersey
- Resting place: Green Hill Cemetery, Laramie, Wyoming
- Education: University of Wyoming
- Parents: Stephen Wheeler Downey (father); Evangeline Victoria Owen (mother)
- Relatives: Sheridan Downey
- Scientific career
- Fields: Psychology
- Workplaces: University of Wyoming
- Thesis: Control Processes in Modified Handwriting (1908)

June Etta Downey (July 13, 1875 – October 11, 1932) was an American psychologist who studied personality and handwriting. Downey was born and raised in Laramie, Wyoming, where she received her degree in Greek and Latin from the University of Wyoming. Throughout her life Downey wrote seven books and over seventy articles. Included in this work, Downey developed the Individual Will-Temperament Test, which was one of the first tests to evaluate character traits separately from intellectual capacity and the first to use psychographic methods for interpretation.

In addition to her many published works, Downey held several prestigious positions. She chaired the Department of Psychology and Philosophy at the University of Wyoming and in doing so became the first woman to hold a head position at a state university. She was appointed to the American Psychological Association Council and became a member of the Society of Experimental Psychologists, and a Fellow of the American Association for the Advancement of Science.

== Biography ==
=== Early life ===
June Etta Downey was born in Laramie, Wyoming, to Stephen Wheeler Downey and Evangeline (Owen) Downey as the second child in a family of nine. Her father was a colonel in the Union Army and one of the founders of the University of Wyoming, and her younger brother, Sheridan Downey, served as United States senator from California between 1938 and 1950. Following education in Laramie public schools and the University of Wyoming preparatory school she entered the university to major in Greek and Latin.

=== Career ===
After graduating with a bachelor's degree in 1895, Downey taught in an elementary school for a year before obtaining her master's degree in philosophy and psychology from the University of Chicago in 1898.

In 1901, Downey gained interest in experimental psychology, while attending a summer course taught by Edward Bradford Titchener at Cornell University. Returning to the University of Wyoming, Downey taught English and psychology while also conducting some laboratory work for a few years, under the supervision of James Rowland Angell.

Downey continued her education of experimental psychology under Edward B. Titchener at Cornell University. She returned to the University of Wyoming in 1905, as a professor of philosophy. In 1906 she took leave from her work in order to complete her doctorate which she finished in 1907 and submitted her thesis in 1908, titled "Control Processes in Modified Handwriting", on the topic of handwriting as a measure of personality.

Following her graduate work, Downey was made head of her department in 1915; she was the first woman to be given such a position in a state university. She published a number of academic papers as well as writing and occasionally publishing short stories, poems, plays, and popular articles, including a volume of poetry titled The Heavenly Dykes. Downey's studies focused on themes of imagery and aesthetics and were concentrated in experimental studies rather than theory. She was one of the first psychologists to study personality scientifically and became an expert in handwriting and handedness.

=== Later life ===
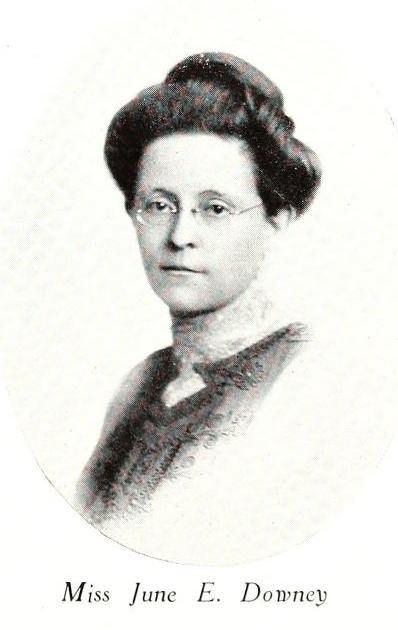

As Downey grew older, she concentrated on her teaching. She published her last book, Creative Imagination, in 1929 tying together her interests in psychology and the arts. Downey gained membership to the council of the American Psychological Association between 1923 and 1925 and was one of the first two women admitted to membership in the Society of Experimental Psychologists in 1929, along with Margaret Washburn. Downey never married and had no children.

Downey died at her sister's home in Trenton, New Jersey, in 1932 after being taken ill with stomach cancer. Shortly after her death, Downey's family presented her private library to the University of Wyoming. The university held a memorial service for her, and in 1999 she was named a finalist of "Wyoming Citizen of the Century". James Rowland Angell, whom Downey worked under for her doctorate, described her as "endowed with an unusually alert and discerning mind and with a maturity of judgment extremely infrequent in students of her age."

== Major contributions ==
Downey primarily did research on handwriting, but included some research on motor processes such as involuntary muscle movement and its connection to the mind and personality. Downey had studied the practice of muscle reading from a psychological perspective.

In 1919, Downey developed the Downey Individual Will-Temperament Test. This test was one of her biggest contributions to personality psychology and was one of the first personality inventories. The test measured personality based on handwriting. It contained 10 smaller tests that when combined could be calculated into a total score that represented one's "will-capacity". The Downey Individual Will-Temperament Test was arranged to represent three personality types. The three personality types are hairtrigger, which is impulsive and quick, the witful type, succinct and decisive, and the accurate type, which is slow and thoughtful. However this type of test had poor reliability because it had measured traits that were similar but had not correlated with each other. These tests were also administered, and scores were deemed subjective. Downy realizing this had planned to make changes before her time of death.

=== Other interests ===
Similar to William James and other eminent psychologists, Downey was greatly interested in the creative arts. She wrote poems, plays, and stories throughout her life. She even wrote the school song, "Alma Mater", for the University of Wyoming. In 1911, she published "The Imaginal Reaction to Poetry", one of her most important experiments involving the arts. This study examined the images people had in response to reading poetry. She believed that variation in such images revealed differences in character.

== Major publications ==
- A Musical Experiment was published in the American Journal of Psychology.
- Her next work was her dissertation titled Control Process in Modified Handwriting: An Experimental Study. In this article she studied the relationship between handwriting and temperament or personality.
- Heavenly Dykes published in 1904
- Imaginal Reaction to Poetry published in 1911
- Graphology and the Psychology of Handwriting published in 1919
- Plots and Personalities published in 1922 Publisher The Century Company described this book as "the queerest book they have ever published."
- The Will-temperament and its Testing published in 1923
- The Kingdom of the Mind published in 1927
- Creative Imagination: Studies in the psychology of literature published in 1929

== Legacy ==
A June Etta Downey Fund in Psychology was established by family members to support professorships, restore the June E. Downey Seminar Room, and support women in the Department of Psychology at the University of Wyoming.

She is also honored by the University of Wyoming, which is home to a bronze plaque with her name on it, the use of "Alma Mater" a song written by her, and has a dormitory building named after her.
