= Francis Townsend =

American politician (1867–1960)

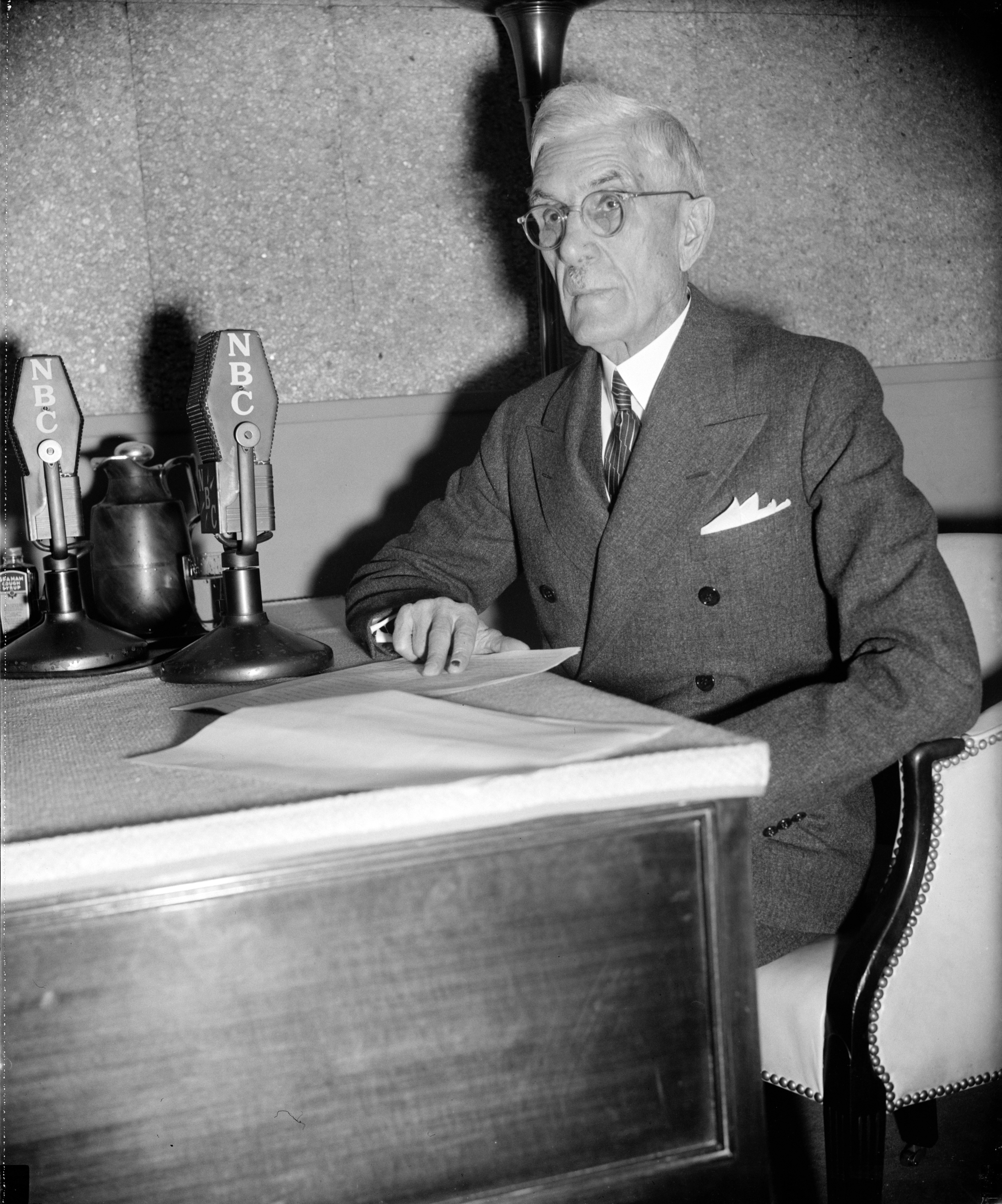
- Townsend c. 1939
- Born: Francis Everett Townsend; January 13, 1867; Fairbury, Illinois, U.S.
- Died: September 1, 1960 (aged 93); Los Angeles, California, U.S.
- Burial place: Woodlawn Memorial Park, Compton, California, U.S.
- Education: Omaha Medical College
- Occupations: Physician, public health officer
- Known for: Townsend Plan
- Spouse: Wilhelmina "Minnie" Bogue

Francis Everett Townsend (/ˈtaʊnzənd/; January 13, 1867 – September 1, 1960) was an American physician and political activist in California. In 1933, he devised an old-age pension scheme to help alleviate the Great Depression. Known as the "Townsend Plan", this proposal would pay every person over age 60 $200 per month, with the requirement it all be spent quickly. It was never enacted but the popularity of the Plan influenced Congress to start the Social Security system, which involved much smaller amounts. The Plan was organized by real estate salesman Robert Clements, who made Townsend only a figurehead while the Plan expanded to thousands of clubs in many states. Townsend was born just outside Fairbury, Illinois, where he is memorialized by a post office named in his honor.

== Life and career ==
Francis Everett Townsend was born the second of six children on January 13, 1867, in Fairbury, Illinois. After Townsend contracted swamp malaria as an infant, the Townsend family moved to Nebraska where Townsend had two years of high school education. In 1898, Townsend borrowed $1,000 from his father and moved to Southern California to develop a hay farming business. The business was not successful, and Townsend enrolled in Omaha Medical College when he was 31. After graduating, Townsend worked in the medical field in Belle Fourche, South Dakota, and met a nurse and his future wife, Wilhelmina "Minnie" Bogue. At age 50, Townsend enlisted as a doctor in the army one year before the end of World War I.

After the war ended in 1918, Townsend moved to Long Beach, California, to run a dry ice factory. After that business quickly failed, Townsend worked for real estate agent Robert Earl Clements in Midway City, California. Clements later masterminded the Townsend Plan. In 1930, at the start of the Great Depression, Townsend became a Long Beach city public health officer at age 63, but lost his job three years later.

Townsend died in Los Angeles on September 1, 1960. He is buried in Woodlawn Memorial Park in Compton, California.

== Townsend Plan ==
The Townsend Plan proposed that every person over 60 be paid $200 per month. The Old-Age Revolving Pension fund was to be supported by a 2% national sales tax aiming to stimulate the economy.

There were three requirements for beneficiaries under the scheme:

- they had to be retired;
- they had to be "free from habitual criminality";
- they had to spend the money within 30 days (to stimulate the economy).

=== Promoting the plan ===
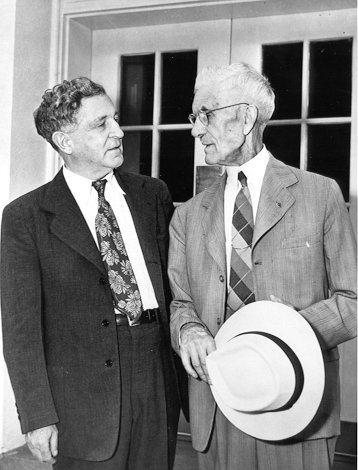
Townsend talks with Senator Sheridan Downey

In September 1933, Townsend wrote a letter to the editor of the local newspaper (the Long Beach Press-Telegram), and launched his career as an old-age activist. According to Townsend's autobiographical memoir, New Horizons (1943), his plan originated when he looked out his window one morning in the early depth of the Depression and saw two old women, dressed in once nice, now tattered clothes, picking through his garbage cans looking for food. Within two years of his putting forward his plan, over 3400 Townsend Plan Clubs were organized all over America and began exerting pressure on Congress to pass an old-age pension. Frances Perkins, President Franklin D. Roosevelt's Secretary of Labor, in her memoir, The Roosevelt I Knew (p. 294) says that Roosevelt told her, "We have to have it [Social Security]. Congress can't stand the pressure of the Townsend Plan unless we have a real old-age insurance system." As Roosevelt said, Social Security was passed by Congress substituting a pay-as-you-go "insurance" scheme for Townsend's far more generous pension plan, but as he told Perkins, it was the Townsend Clubs that forced Congress to act at all.

=== After the adoption of Social Security and Townsend's death ===
The movement continued beyond Townsend's death in 1960. In 1978, The Associated Press reported that the National Townsend Plan would be shut down by the end of February that year, with only state chapters surviving, and that by then it had a "dwindling and aging membership."

== Investigation ==
A Congressional committee was established in February 1936 to investigate Townsend. One of the findings was that the Townsend organization had raised over a million dollars and that Townsend had received a salary of $12,000 for the previous 12 months.

While being questioned Townsend became angry at the questioning and stormed out. He was prosecuted for contempt of Congress and sentenced to 30 days in prison. However, in 1938, just as he entered jail to serve his sentence, he was granted a pardon by President Roosevelt.

== See also ==
- New Deal coalition
