= 3rd Maryland Infantry Regiment, Potomac Home Brigade =

- Active: October 31, 1861, to May 29, 1865
- Country: United States
- Allegiance: Union
- Branch: Infantry
- Engagements: Battle of Harper's Ferry; Battle of Monocacy

The 3rd Maryland Infantry Regiment, Potomac Home Brigade was an infantry regiment that served in the Union Army during the American Civil War.

== Service ==
The 3rd Maryland Infantry Regiment, Potomac Home Brigade was organized at Cumberland, Hagerstown, and Baltimore, Maryland, beginning October 31, 1861, and mustered in on May 20, 1862, for three years under the command of Colonel Henry C. Rizer. Companies I and K were organized at Ellicott's Mills and Monrovia, Maryland, in April and May 1864.

The regiment was attached to Railroad District of Western Virginia to January 1862. Lander's Division, Army of the Potomac, to March 1862. Railroad District, Mountain Department, to July 1862. Railroad Brigade, VIII Corps, Middle Department, to September 1862. Harper's Ferry, Virginia, September 1862. Annapolis, VIII Corps to July 1863. 3rd Separate Brigade, VIII Corps, to October 1863. 1st Separate Brigade, VIII Corps, to July 1864. John R. Kenly's Independent Brigade, VI Corps, Army of the Shenandoah, to August 1864. Kenly's Brigade, Reserve Division, West Virginia, to October 1864. Reserve Division, West Virginia, to April 1865. 1st Brigade, 1st Division, West Virginia, to May 29, 1865.

The 3rd Maryland Infantry, Potomac Home Brigade mustered out of the service at Baltimore on May 29, 1865.

== Detailed service ==
Assigned to duty as railroad guard on Upper Potomac in Maryland and Virginia. Action at Grass Lick, W. Va., April 23, 1862. Wardensville May 7. Franklin May 10–12. Moorefield June 29. Siege of Harper's Ferry, W. Va., September 12–15. Surrendered September 15. Paroled September 16 and sent to Annapolis, Md. Duty at Annapolis and in the defenses of Baltimore until June 1863. Guard Washington Branch, Baltimore & Ohio Railroad, June 28-July 10. At Annapolis, Relay Station, Annapolis Junction and Monocacy until July 1864. Operations against Early's invasion of Maryland July 1864. Frederick City July 7–8. Battle of Monocacy July 9. Pursuit of Early until July 30. Snicker's Gap July 18. Bolivar Heights August 6. Halltown August 8. Charlestown August 9. Berryville August 13. Duty in the District of Harper's Ferry, W. Va., until May 1865. Ordered to Baltimore, May 12.

== Commanders ==
- Colonel Henry C. Rizer
- Colonel Stephen Wheeler Downey
- Colonel Charles Gilpin

== Casualties ==
The regiment lost a total of 83 men during service; 1 officer and 8 enlisted men killed or mortally wounded, 1 officer and 73 enlisted men died of disease.

== See also ==
- List of Maryland Civil War Units
- Maryland in the American Civil War
