= Obama coalition =

Voting blocs supporting Barack Obama

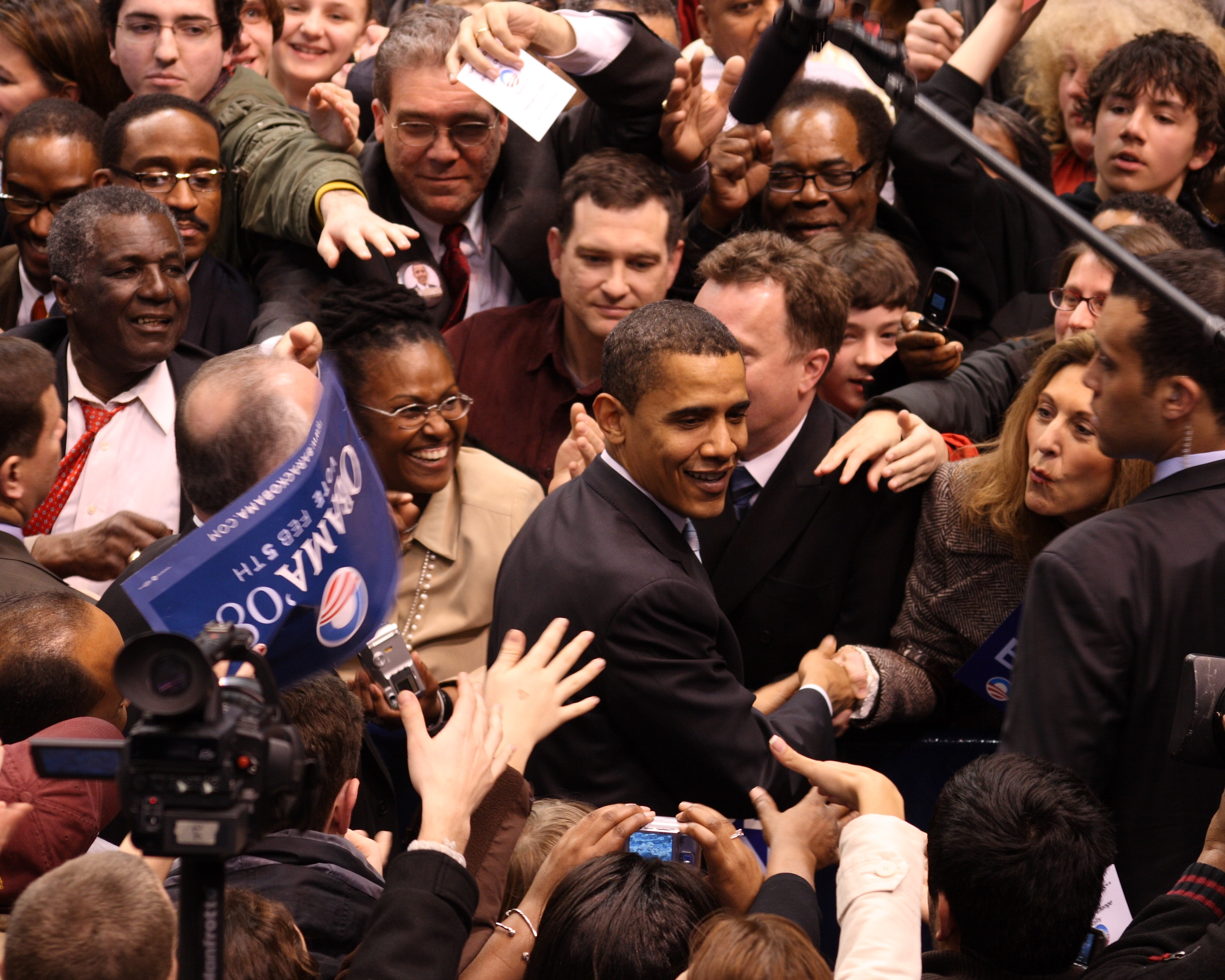
Barack Obama shaking hands with supporters in 2008

The Obama coalition was the combination of various voting blocs that supported the candidacy and presidency of Barack Obama. It consisted primarily of racial minorities, along with women and young voters. It allowed for high vote share among cities and suburbs, as well as among voters that self-described as moderate. The coalition formed in 2007 and 2008 as Obama campaigned for the presidency. During the 2008 election, the strength of the coalition gave Obama 53% of the vote. In 2012, he won reelection with 51% of the vote along similar demographic lines. This made Obama the first Democratic president since Franklin D. Roosevelt's last two re-elections in 1940 and 1944 to win the majority of the popular vote in multiple elections.

The weaknesses of the coalition became apparent during the two midterm elections that took place during Obama's presidency. During the 2010 midterms, significant portions of the coalition failed to turn out or defected to the Republican Party. Similar results occurred in the 2014 midterms. Hillary Clinton was described as attempting to continue the Obama coalition in order to win the presidential election in 2016, with her loss to Donald Trump marking a failure to maintain the coalition.

During the 2020 Democratic Party presidential debates, Kamala Harris argued that it was necessary to "rebuild the Obama coalition" for the Democratic Party to win the presidential election. After receiving the Democratic nomination, Obama's former Vice President Joe Biden was described as requiring a new coalition due to shifts in voting patterns over the previous years; the white working-class had moved away from the coalition while women aligned with it in stronger numbers. Shifts had also taken place among suburban and nonwhite voters. In 2020, Biden won the presidential election with the same voting blocs as the Obama coalition, defeating incumbent president Donald Trump with 51% of the vote.

In 2024, the coalition was claimed to be largely fallen apart as working class of all races had moved away from the coalition, causing Biden's Vice President Kamala Harris to lose the presidential election and the popular vote to former president Donald Trump. Nate Cohn of The New York Times stated that Trump had made larger gains with racial minorities than White voters without college degrees compared to the 2012 presidential election (the last pre-Trump election), with Democratic gains being mainly just among White voters with college degrees.

== Vote share ==
Obama vote share by demographic subgroup
Demographic subgroup	2008	2012	2008 to 2012 Swing
Total vote	53	51	-2
Ideology			
Liberals	89	86	-3
Moderates	60	56	-4
Conservatives	20	17	-3
Party			
Democrats	89	92	3
Republicans	9	6	-3
Independents	52	45	-7
Gender			
Men	49	45	-4
Women	56	55	-1
Marital status			
Married	47	42	-5
Unmarried	65	62	-3
Race			
White	43	39	-4
Black	95	93	-2
Asian	62	73	11
Other	66	58	-8
Hispanic	67	71	4
Religion			
Protestant	45	42	-3
Catholic	54	50	-4
Jewish	78	69	-9
Other	73	74	1
None	75	70	-5
Religious service attendance			
More than weekly	43	36	-7
Weekly	43	41	-2
Monthly	53	55	-2
A few times a year	59	56	-3
Never	67	62	-5
White evangelical or born-again Christian?			
White evangelical or born-again Christian	24	21	-3
Everyone else	62	60	-2
Age			
18–24 years old	66	60	-6
25–29 years old	66	60	-6
30–39 years old	54	55	1
40–49 years old	49	48	-1
50–64 years old	50	47	-3
65 and older	45	44	-1
Age by race			
Whites 18–29 years old	54	44	-10
Whites 30–44 years old	41	38	-3
Whites 45–64 years old	42	38	-4
Whites 65 and older	40	39	-1
Blacks 18–29 years old	95	91	-4
Blacks 30–44 years old	96	94	-2
Blacks 45–64 years old	96	93	-3
Blacks 65 and older	94	93	-1
Latinos 18–29 years old	76	74	-2
Latinos 30–44 years old	63	71	8
Latinos 45–64 years old	58	68	10
Latinos 65 and older	68	65	-3
Others	64	67	3
Sexual orientation			
LGBT	70	76	6
Heterosexual	53	49	-4
Education			
Not a high school graduate	63	64	1
High school graduate	52	51	-1
Some college education	51	49	-2
College graduate	50	47	-3
Postgraduate education	58	55	-5
Union households			
Union	59	58	-1
Non-union	51	49	-2
Issue regarded as most important			
Economy	53	47	-6
Health care	73	75	2
Region			
Northeast	59	59	0
Midwest	54	50	-4
South	45	46	1
West	57	54	-3

== See also ==
- 2008 Democratic Party presidential primaries
- History of the Democratic Party (United States)
- History of the United States (1991–2016)
- History of the United States (2016–present)
- Modern liberalism in the United States
- New Deal coalition
- Obama–Trump voters
- Reagan coalition
- Sixth Party System
