= 83rd Ohio Infantry Regiment =

- Active: August 1862 to August 10, 1865
- Country: United States
- Allegiance: Union
- Branch: Infantry
- Engagements: Defense of Cincinnati; Battle of Chickasaw Bayou; Battle of Arkansas Post; Battle of Port Gibson; Battle of Champion Hill; Battle of Big Black River Bridge; Siege of Vicksburg, May 19 & May 22 assaults; Siege of Jackson; Red River Campaign; Battle of Sabine Cross Roads; Battle of Fort Blakeley

The 83rd Ohio Infantry Regiment, sometimes 83rd Ohio Volunteer Infantry (or 83rd OVI) was an infantry regiment in the Union Army during the American Civil War. It was nicknamed "The Greyhound Regiment".

== Service ==
The 83rd Ohio Infantry was organized at Camp Dennison near Cincinnati, Ohio August through September 1862 and mustered in for three years service under the command of Colonel Frederick William Moore.

The regiment was attached to 1st Brigade, 2nd Division, Army of Kentucky, Department of the Ohio, to December 1862. 1st Brigade, 10th Division, XIII Corps), Department of the Tennessee, December 1862. 1st Brigade, 1st Division, Sherman's Yazoo Expedition, to January 1863. 1st Brigade, 10th Division, XIII Corps, Army of the Tennessee, to August 1863. 1st Brigade, 4th Division, XIII Corps, Army of the Tennessee, August 1863, and Department of the Gulf to January 1864. 2nd Brigade, 3rd Division, XIII Corps, Army of the Gulf, to March 1864. 1st Brigade, 4th Division, XIII Corps, to June 1864. 3rd Brigade, 3rd Division, XIX Corps, Department of the Gulf, to December 1864. Post of Natchez, Mississippi, District of Vicksburg, Mississippi, to January 1864. 3rd Brigade, Reserve Corps, Military Division West Mississippi, to February 1865. 3rd Brigade, 2nd Division, Reserve Corps, February 1865. 3rd Brigade, 2nd Division, XIII Corps, to July 1865.

The 83rd Ohio Infantry mustered out of service at Galveston, Texas, on July 24, 1865, and was discharged at Camp Dennison on August 10, 1865. Veterans and recruits were transferred to the 48th Ohio Infantry Battalion.

== Detailed service ==
Moved to Covington, Ky., September 3, 1862, to repel Kirby Smith's threatened attack on Cincinnati, Ohio. Expedition to Cynthiana, Ky., September 18, 1862. Moved to Camp Shaler September 25, then to Paris, Ky., October 15. To Louisville, Ky., October 28, and to Memphis, Tenn., November 23. Sherman's Yazoo Expedition December 20, 1862, to January 3, 1863. Expedition from Milliken's Bend to Dallas Station and Delhi, December 25–26. Chickasaw Bayou December 26–28. Chickasaw Bluff December 29. Expedition to Arkansas Post, Ark., January 3–10, 1863. Assault and capture of Fort Hindman, Arkansas Post, January 10–11. Moved to Young's Point, La., January 15, and duty there until March 10. Expedition to Greenville, Miss., and Cypress Bend, Ark., February 14–26. Deer Creek near Greenville February 23. At Milliken's Bend, La., until April 15. Movement on Bruinsburg and turning Grand Gulf April 25–30. Battle of Port Gibson May 1. Battle of Champion Hill May 16. Big Black River May 17. Siege of Vicksburg, Miss., May 18-July 4. Assaults on Vicksburg May 19 and 22. Advance on Jackson, Miss., July 4–10. Siege of Jackson July 10–17. Camp at Vicksburg until August 24. Ordered to New Orleans, La., August 24. Expedition from Carrollton to New and Amite Rivers September 24–29. Moved to Brashear City. Western Louisiana Campaign October 3-November 30. Grand Coteau November 3. At New Iberia until December 19. Moved to New Orleans, La., then to Madisonville January 19, 1864, and duty there until March. Red River Campaign March 10-May 22. Advance from Franklin to Alexandria March 14–26. Bayou de Paul and battle of Sabine Cross Roads April 8, 1864. Monett's Ferry, Cane River Crossing, April 23. Construction of dam at Alexandria April 30-May 10. Gov. Moore's Plantation May 2. Alexandria May 2–9. Retreat to Morganza May 13–20. Mansura May 16. Moved to Baton Rouge, La., May 28, and duty there until July 21. Moved to Morganza July 21, and duty there until November. Expedition to Morgan's Ferry October 1–9, and to the Atchafalaya October 18–29. At mouth of White River November 1-December 6. Moved to Natchez December 6 and duty there until January 28, 1865. Consolidated with 48th Ohio Infantry January 17, 1865. Moved to Kennersville, La., January 28, then to New Orleans and to Barrancas, Fla. Campaign against Mobile, Ala., and its defenses March–April. March from Pensacola, Fla., to Blakely, Ala., March 20-April 2. Occupation of Canoe Station March 27. Siege of Fort Blakely April 2–9. Assault and capture of Fort Blakely April 9. Capture of Mobile April 12. March to Montgomery and Selma April 13–25. Duty at Selma until May 12. Moved to Mobile May 12, then to Galveston, Texas, June 13, and duty there until July 24.

== Casualties ==
The regiment lost a total of 219 men during service; 4 officers and 52 enlisted men killed or mortally wounded, 2 officers and 161 enlisted men died of disease.

== Commanders ==
- Colonel Frederick William Moore

== Notable members ==
- Sergeant Joseph Stickels, Company A - Medal of Honor recipient for action at the battle of Fort Blakeley, April 9, 1865
- Lieutenant Colonel John W. Donnellan, 1st Treasurer of the Wyoming Territory

== See also ==
- List of Ohio Civil War units
- Ohio in the Civil War
