= 1934 California lieutenant gubernatorial election =

- November 6, 1934
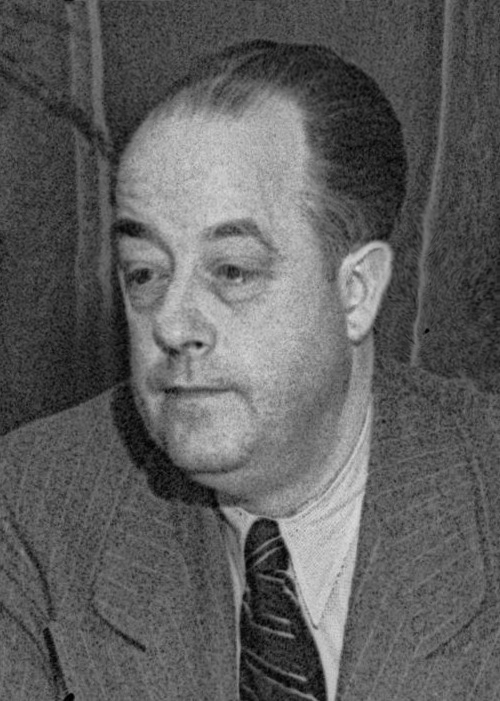

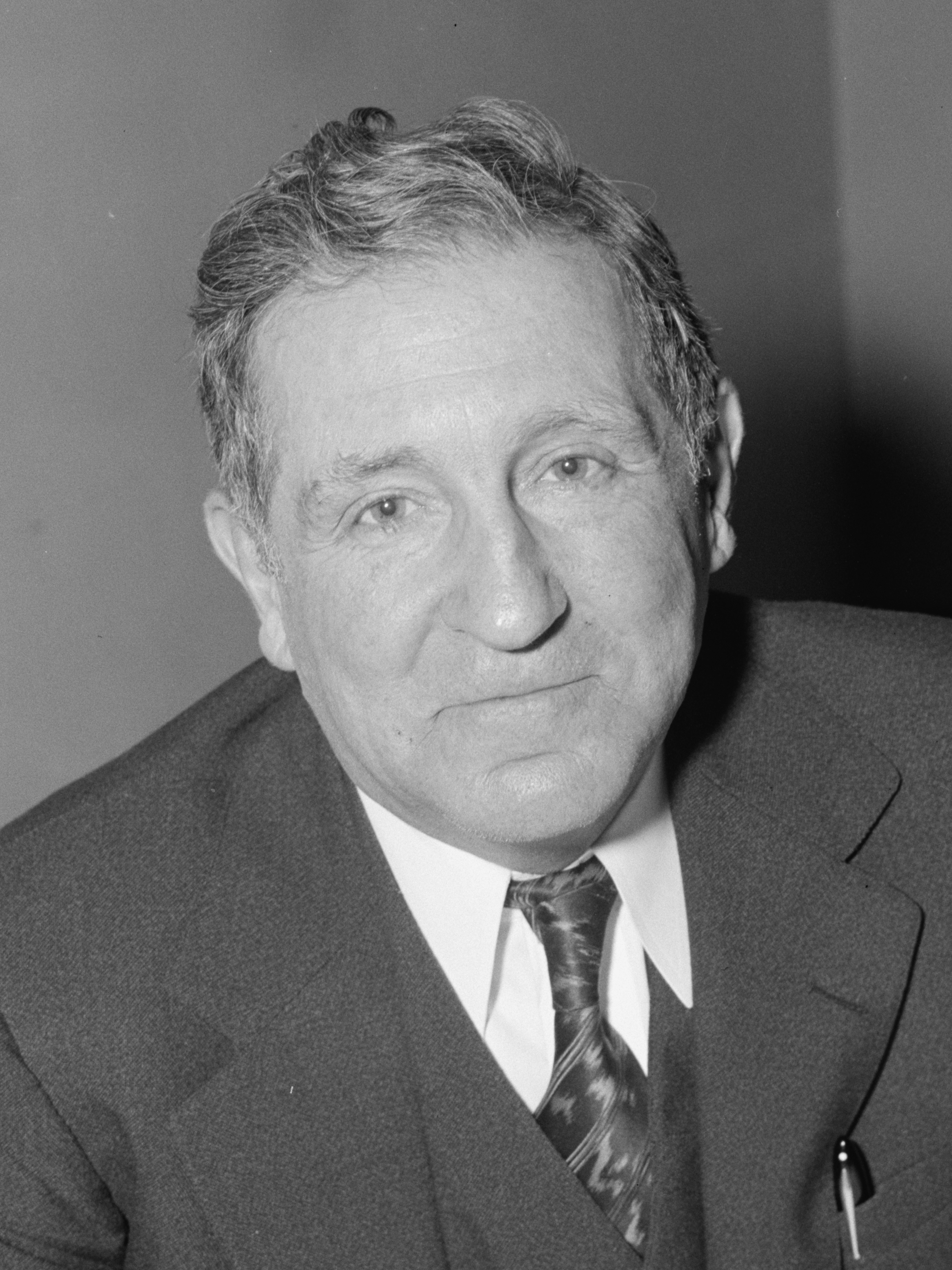
Nominee	George J. Hatfield	Sheridan Downey
Party	Republican	Democratic
Popular vote	1,220,515	1,002,832
Percentage	54.25%	44.58%
- County results Hatfield: 40–50% 50–60 60–70% 80–90% Downey: 50–60%
Lieutenant Governor before election
Frank Merriam
Republican
Elected Lieutenant Governor
George J. Hatfield
Republican

The 1934 California lieutenant gubernatorial election was held on November 6, 1934. Republican U.S. Attorney for the Northern District of California George J. Hatfield defeated Democratic attorney Sheridan Downey with 54.25% of the vote.

== General election ==
=== Candidates ===
- George J. Hatfield, Republican
- Sheridan Downey, Democratic
- Jesse W. Southwick, Socialist
- Pettis Perry, Communist

=== Results ===
1934 California lieutenant gubernatorial election
Party	Candidate	Votes	%	±%
Republican	George J. Hatfield	1,220,515	54.25%	
Democratic	Sheridan Downey	1,002,832	44.58%	
Socialist	Jesse W. Southwick	15,741	0.70%	
Communist	Pettis Perry	10,528	0.47%	
Scattering		78	0.00%	
Majority		2,249,694		
Turnout				
Republican hold		Swing		
