= Townsend Plan =

1933 US proposal for old-age pensions

The Townsend Plan, initially Old-Age Revolving Pensions (OARP), began as a September 1933 proposal by California physician Francis Townsend for an old-age pension in response to the Great Depression, and led a social and political movement. At its peak in 1936, the Townsend Plan, as the organization was called, claimed about two million members in its "Townsend Clubs". The Townsend Plan demonstrated the nationwide demand for old-age pensions, helping to prompt Congress and President Franklin D. Roosevelt to adopt a national Social Security policy, though Townsend's original plan called for greater benefits to a greater number of people than Social Security provided for. The Townsend Plan continued to press for improvements in U.S. old-age policy and helped to spur amendments to the Social Security Act in 1939.

== Origins ==
The Townsend Plan had its origins in September 1933 when Dr. Francis Townsend, a California physician, first published his proposal for what he called "old-age revolving pensions" in a letter to the editor of his local newspaper, the Long Beach Press-Telegram. According to Townsend's 1943 memoir, his plan originated when he saw two old women, dressed in tattered clothes, picking through his garbage cans looking for food.

Townsend's letter called for all Americans over the age of sixty to receive $200 ($4,974 in 2025) at the start of each month, if they refrained from work and spent the $200 by month's end. According to Townsend, the pension was intended to decrease labor supply and competition by removing the aged from the workforce and would increase spending to stimulate economic recovery from the Depression.

Besides the age and spending requirements, the plan had few restrictions. Recipients did not have to be poor or build up a long work record. There were no gender or racial restrictions, though the recipients had to be "free from habitual criminality."

== Organization ==
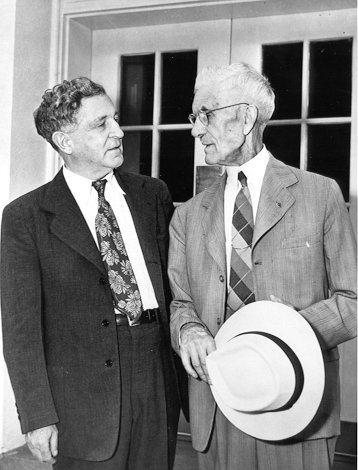
Townsend (right) talks with Senator Sheridan Downey of California

In January 1934, Townsend, his brother Walter, and his former employer, real estate agent Robert E. Clements, established Old Age Revolving Pensions, Ltd. The first local Townsend club was established in Huntington Beach, California in August 1934; local organizers, either volunteer or paid, would establish chapters once one hundred members had been secured. (Note: The membership requirement was lowered to thirty members later in the 1930s.) The organization expanded beyond California and the western United States in the summer of 1935.

Typically, a local club would meet weekly to hear speakers and advocate for the OARP plan. Membership dues were one quarter, of which ten cents went to the national organization and five cents to regional, state, and congressional district organizers. Almost all club members were of old age.

An exact membership size is difficult to identify because of a lack of hard data, exaggeration by organization leaders, and unclear definition of membership. In February 1935, the OARP national organization claimed that 20 million persons nationwide had signed petitions to promote the plan, but by the time these petitions were presented to Congress in 1936, Townsend claimed only 10 million signatures, which were never counted. All that said, membership increased in late 1935, after the organization intervened in an off-year election in Michigan, where its candidate won handily in an upset. In early 1936, surviving evidence indicate that it reached about 2 million club members with 8000 clubs across the country.

In the wake of this upsurge, the organization was subjected to a thorough investigation by Congress. A bipartisan House select committee was established, chiefly for the purpose of investigating the Townsend organization. Though no charges were brought, the investigation revealed that the Townsend National Weekly was a for-profit publication and enormous commissions were given to some state organizers and Clements, who personally received upwards of $70,000 ($1.62 million in 2025). As a result of the investigation, the organization's membership and income stalled, and Clements was forced to resign. The organization was renamed Townsend National Recovery Plan, Inc.

Nevertheless, the organization eventually recovered and continued to press for old-age benefits.

== 1935 proposal ==
In January 1935, Representative John S. McGroarty of California proposed the OARP plan as a bill before Congress. Under McGroarty's bill, the plan's costs, which estimated at $24 million annually ($564 million in 2025), would be funded by a two-percent national tax on all transactions, a "multiple" sales tax. The bill was subject to criticism from academic economists, who thought the plan unworkable, and opposed by politicians of all persuasions: leftists who opposed the tax as regressive, conservatives who opposed all further taxation and spending, and moderates who found alternative insurance and assistance programs more palatable.

Dr. Townsend testified for the bill before Congress, but his testimony was ineffective. He admitted that the tax would likely not cover the cost of the program, that 75 years old was a more viable retirement age, and that the transactions tax was in effect a sales tax. At one point in his testimony, Townsend refused to testify by getting up from his seat and walking out while being questioned. By contrast to the competing Economic Security bill, for which the Roosevelt administration prepared witnesses for deposition, the expert testimony for the McGroarty bill was a resounding failure.

The McGroarty bill was subsequently amended to make payments only as the tax revenue allowed, but it was voted down 56 to 206, with many Western Democrats abstaining for fear of going on the record for or against the bill. The Social Security Act passed in August 1935, temporarily suspending calls for OARP.

== Later years ==
The Townsend Plan continued for four decades, but did not really have much influence after 1950. In 1978, the national Townsend Plan was shut down, with only state chapters surviving, and that by then it had a "dwindling and aging membership."

Frances Perkins, President Roosevelt's Secretary of Labor, in her memoir, The Roosevelt I Knew (p. 294) says that Roosevelt told her, "We have to have it [Social Security]. Congress can't stand the pressure of the Townsend Plan unless we have a real old-age insurance system." As Roosevelt said, Social Security was passed by Congress substituting a pay-as-you-go "insurance" scheme for Townsend's far more generous pension plan, but as he told Perkins, it was the Townsend Clubs that forced Congress to act at all.

== See also ==
- New Deal coalition
- Ham and Eggs Movement
- End Poverty in California
