= John W. Donnellan =

American politician

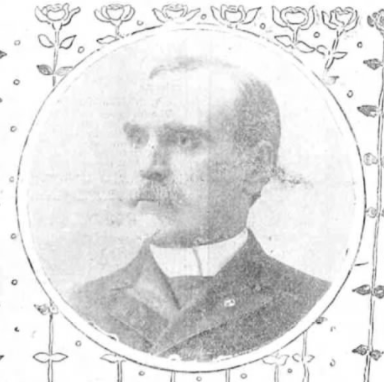

1st Treasurer of the Wyoming Territory
- In office December 21, 1869 – October 26, 1872
- Succeeded by: Stephen W. Downey

Personal details
- Born: June 8, 1841 County Clare, United Kingdom of Great Britain and Ireland
- Died: July 26, 1917 (aged 76) Sacramento, California, U.S.
- Resting place: Sacramento Historic City Cemetery
- Party: Democratic
- Spouse: Marion J. McNasser
- Children: 3

Military service
- Allegiance: United States of America
- Branch/service: Union Army
- Years of service: 1861-1865
- Rank: Lieutenant colonel
- Unit: 83rd Ohio Infantry; 27th Colored Infantry Regiment
- Battles/wars: American Civil War

John W. Donnellan (June 8, 1841 – July 26, 1917) was an American politician who served as the 1st Treasurer of the Wyoming Territory as a Democrat.

== Life ==
John W. Donnellan was born on June 8, 1841, in County Clare, United Kingdom of Great Britain and Ireland and his family immigrated to the United States and settled in Cincinnati, Ohio. In 1851 he moved to Fort Leavenworth, Kansas and became a bookkeeper. In 1861 he joined the 83rd Ohio Infantry and later was made a lieutenant colonel in the 27th Colored Infantry Regiment.

In 1867 he moved to Cheyenne, Wyoming Territory and later started a bank in Laramie. On December 21, 1869, President Ulysses S. Grant appointed him as treasurer of the Wyoming Territory and served until October 26, 1872. In 1870 he married Marion J. Donnellan and moved back to Laramie in 1876 where he served as a probate judge. Afterwards he moved to Salt Lake City and worked for a banking company and then to Sacramento in 1903 due to his wife's poor health.

In 1913 he became a naturalized citizen. On July 26, 1917, he died in Sacramento, California, at age 76.
