= New Deal coalition =

US Democratic Party political coalition

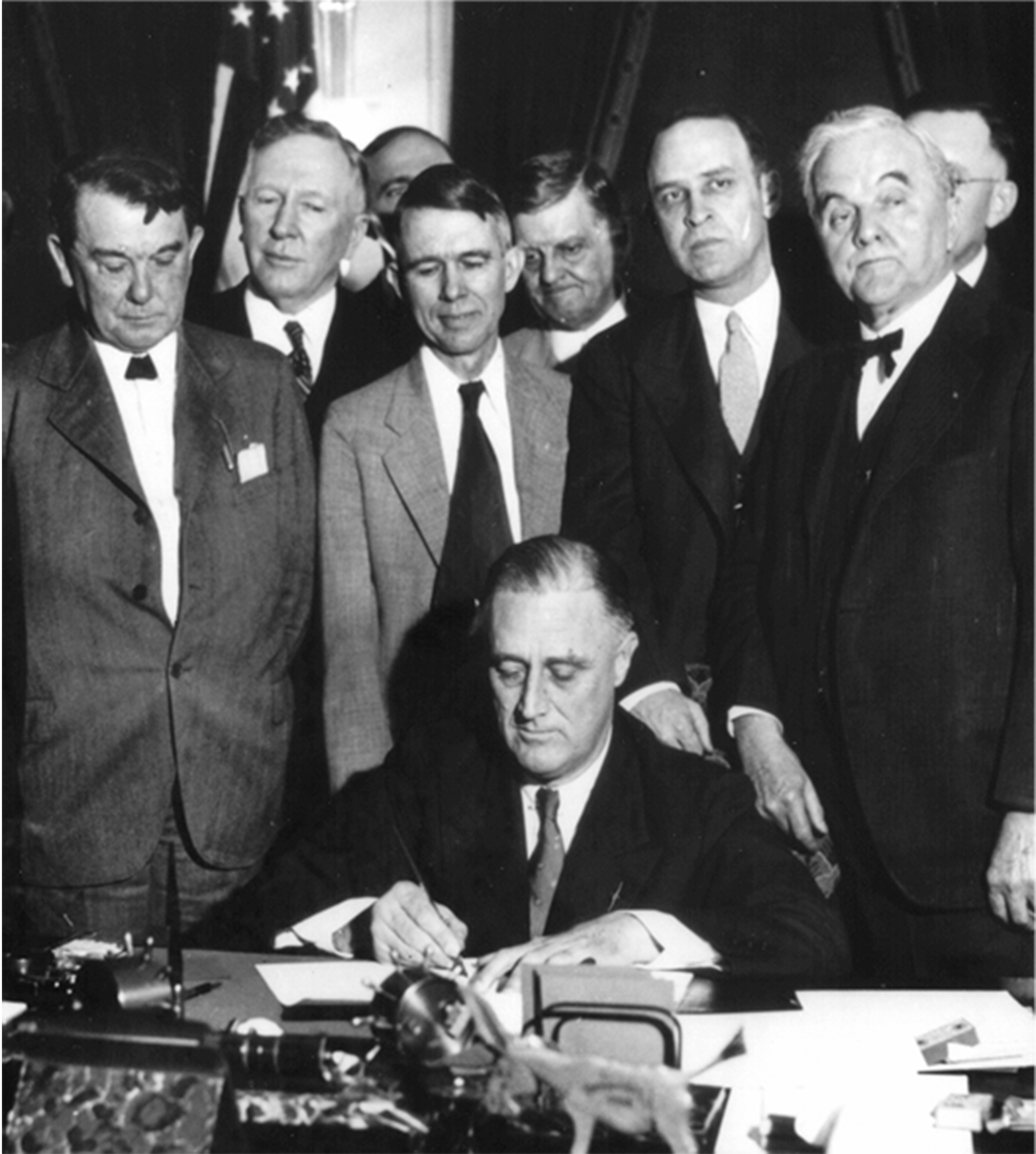
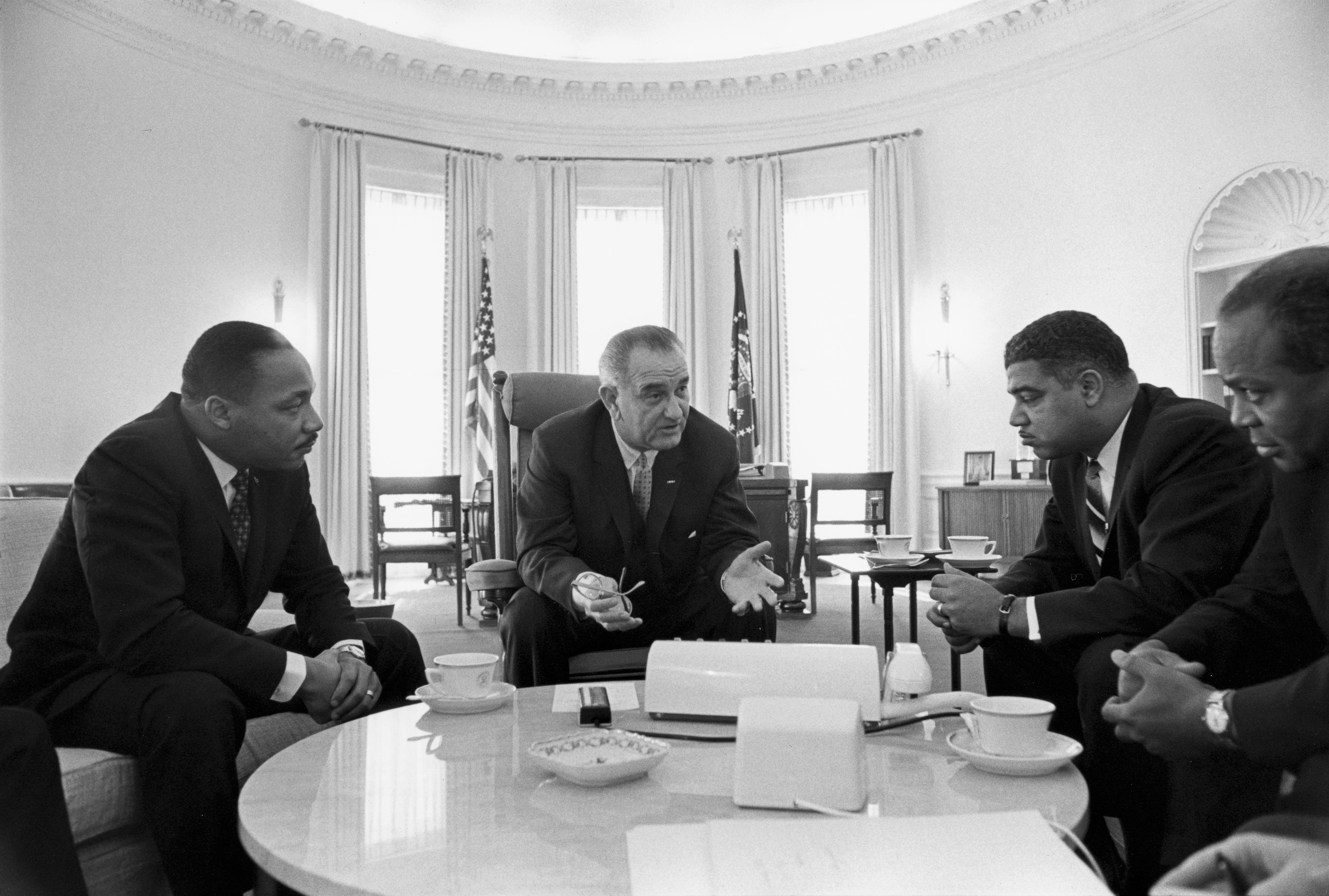
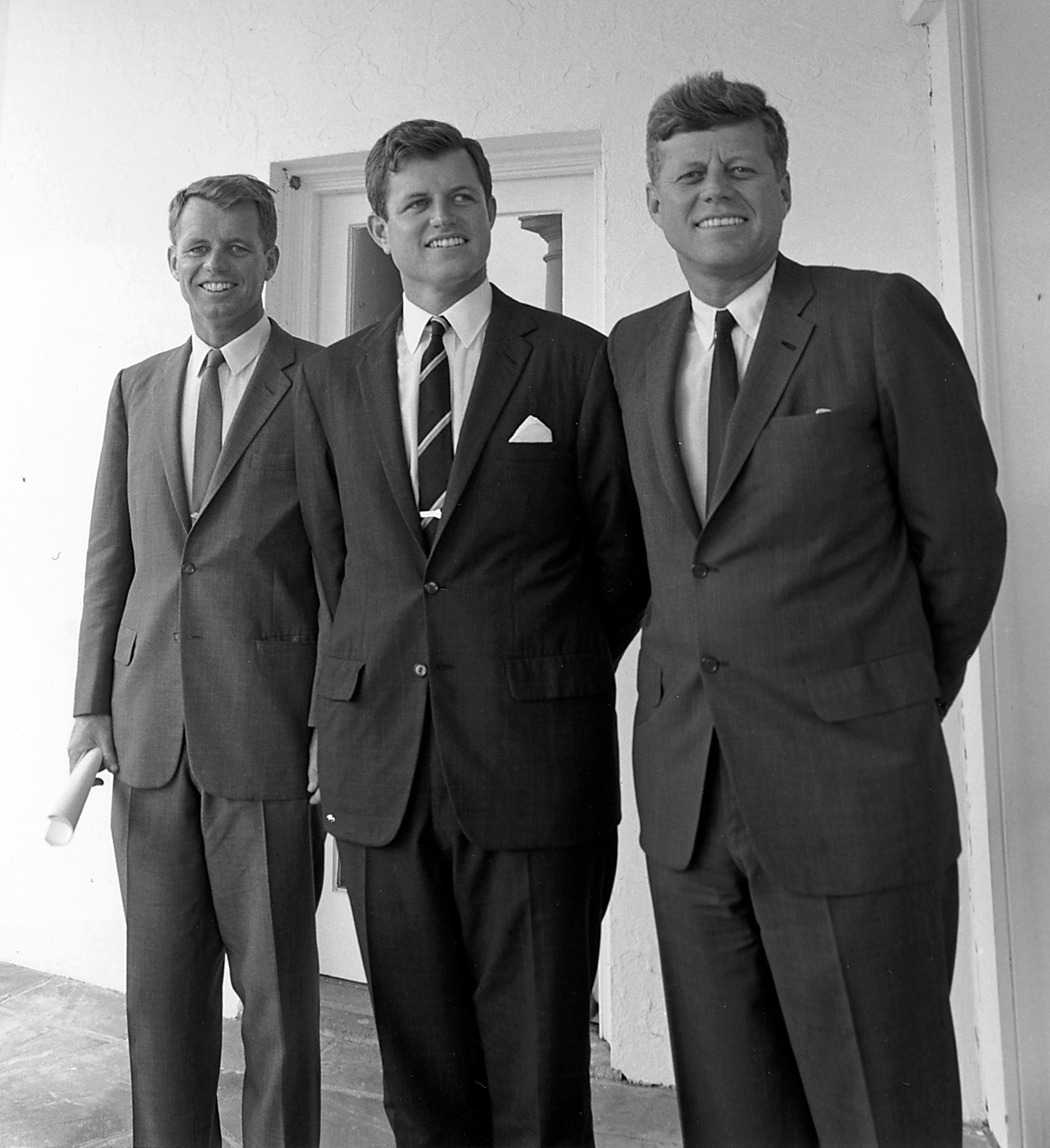
- From left to right, top to bottom: Franklin D. Roosevelt's portrait from 1933; Roosevelt signing the Tennessee Valley Authority Act; Lyndon B. Johnson meeting with civil rights leaders Martin Luther King Jr., Whitney Young, and James Farmer; The Kennedy brothers: John F. Kennedy, Robert F. Kennedy, and Ted Kennedy
- Prominent members: Franklin D. Roosevelt; Eleanor Roosevelt; Henry A. Wallace; Harry S. Truman; Alben W. Barkley; Lyndon B. Johnson; Estes Kefauver; John F. Kennedy; Adlai Stevenson II; Hubert Humphrey; Eugene McCarthy; Fiorello LaGuardia; Wayne Morse; Edmund Muskie; W. Averell Harriman; Pat Brown
- Founder: Franklin D. Roosevelt
- Founded: 1932; 94 years ago
- Dissolved: 1970s (Note: Southern elements) to c. 1992 (Note: National elements)
- Succeeded by: Progressive Caucus; National Progressives of America
- Ideology: Progressivism (US); Modern liberalism Left-wing populism Social democracy Later Phase: Truman Doctrine (Anti-communism); Race egalitarianism
- Political position: Center-left; Factions: left-wing
- National affiliation: Democratic Party

The New Deal coalition was an American political coalition that supported the Democratic Party beginning in 1932. The coalition is named after President Franklin D. Roosevelt's New Deal programs, and the follow-up Democratic presidents. It was composed of voting blocs who supported them. The coalition included labor unions, blue-collar workers, big city machines, racial and religious minorities (including Jews, Catholics, and African Americans), white Southerners, and intellectuals. Besides voters the coalition included powerful interest groups: Democratic Party organizations in most states, city machines, labor unions, some third parties, universities, and foundations. It was largely opposed by the Republican Party, the business community, and some Protestants. In creating his coalition, Roosevelt was at first eager to include liberal Republicans and some radical third parties, even if it meant downplaying the "Democratic" name. By the 1940s, the Republican and third-party allies had mostly been defeated. In 1948, the Democratic Party stood alone and won both the White House and both congressional houses with a mandate, surviving the splits that created two splinter parties.

The coalition made the Democratic Party the majority party nationally for decades. From 1933 to 1968, Democrats only lost control of the White House when Republican Dwight D. Eisenhower was elected president in 1952 and was then reelected in 1956 due to his broad popularity. The Democrats typically controlled both Houses of Congress before the 1990s. The coalition began to weaken with the collapse of big city machines after 1940, the steady decline of labor unions after 1970, the bitter factionalism during the 1968 election, the turn of northern white ethnics and southern whites toward conservatism on racial issues, and the rise of neoliberalism under the presidency of Ronald Reagan, with its opposition to regulation. The coalition is generally considered to have been extinguished upon the election of Bill Clinton to the presidency alongside the introduction of the Third Way's faction into mainstream American politics.

== History ==
=== Formation ===
The Great Depression in the United States began in 1929 and was often blamed on Republicans and their big business allies. Republican president Herbert Hoover opposed federal relief efforts as unwarranted, believing that market actors and local governments were better suited to address the situation. As the depression worsened, voters became increasingly dissatisfied with this approach and came to view President Hoover as indifferent to their economic struggles. Franklin D. Roosevelt won a landslide in 1932 and spent his time in office building a powerful nationwide coalition and keeping his partners from squabbling with each other.

Over the course of the 1930s, Roosevelt forged a coalition of liberals, labor unions, Northern religious and ethnic minorities (Catholic, Jewish, and Black), and (few) liberal White Southerners. These voting blocs together formed a majority of voters and handed the Democratic Party seven victories out of nine presidential elections (1932–1948, 1960, 1964), as well as control of both houses of Congress during all but four years between the years 1932–1980 (Republicans won small majorities in 1946 and 1952). Political scientists describe this realignment as the "Fifth Party System", in contrast to the Fourth Party System of the 1896–1932 era that proceeded it.

City machines had major roles to play. Most important, the New Deal coalition had to carry entire states, not just cities. The largest possible landslide was needed, and the city machines came through in 1940, 1944, and 1948. They kept the voters by providing federal jobs aimed at the unemployed—the Civil Works Administration, the Civilian Conservation Corps (where the boys' wages went to the unemployed father), the Federal Emergency Relief Administration, and especially the Works Progress Administration (WPA). A representative transition came in Pittsburgh, which had long been a Republican stronghold with a promise of prosperity. The worsening depression enabled the Democrats to convince some Republicans to switch parties while mobilizing large numbers of ethnics who had not voted before. Democrats capitalized on Roosevelt's popularity to win the 1933 mayoral race. The WPA then played a critical role in the consolidation of the Democratic machine. By 1936 the Democrats had a majority in the registration rolls for the first time since the Civil War. That November FDR won 70% of the Pittsburgh vote.

=== Roosevelt moves left ===
The president in 1933 wanted to bring all major groups together, business and labor, banker and borrower, farms and towns, liberals and conservatives. The escalating attacks from the right, typified by the American Liberty League led by his old friend Al Smith, spoiled the dream. Sensing how quickly public opinion was becoming more radical, Roosevelt moved left. He attacked big business. His major innovations now were social security for the elderly, the WPA for the unemployed, and a new labor relations act to support and encourage labor unions. Running for reelection in 1936, Roosevelt personalized the campaign and downplayed the Democratic Party name. In contrast to his 1933 position as a neutral moderator between business and workers, he now became a strong labor union supporter. He crusaded against the rich upper class, denouncing the "economic royalists". He worked with third parties on the left: the Minnesota Farmer–Labor Party, the Wisconsin Progressive Party, and the American Labor Party (ALP) in New York state. In New York City he collaborated closely with Republican Fiorello La Guardia, against the conservatives of Tammany Hall who had controlled city hall. La Guardia was the candidate of the ad-hoc City Fusion Party, winning the mayoralty in 1933 and reelection in 1937 and 1941. La Guardia was also the nominee of the American Labor Party (ALP), a union-dominated left-wing group that supported Roosevelt in 1936, 1940, and 1944. The role of the ALP was to funnel socialists who distrusted the Democratic Party into the New Deal coalition. In 1940 La Guardia chaired the nationwide Committee of Independent Voters for Roosevelt; in return, the president put him in charge of the Office of Civilian Defense. He retired and was replaced as mayor in 1945 by William O'Dwyer, the Tammany candidate.

=== WPA jobs and Democratic party organizations ===
Roosevelt's top aide in distributing patronage was James Farley, who served simultaneously as chair of the New York State Democratic Party, chair of the Democratic National Committee (DNC), and Postmaster General in FDR's cabinet, as well as FDR's campaign manager in 1932 and 1940. He handled traditional patronage for the Post Office. He helped with the new agencies aimed at the unemployed, especially the Works Progress Administration and Civilian Conservation Corps, as well as other job agencies. He helped state and local Democratic organizations set up systems to select likely candidates for the federal payroll. In the 1940s most of the big city machines collapsed, with a few exceptions such as Chicago and Albany, New York.

Being a voter or a Democrat was not a prerequisite for a relief job. Federal law specifically prohibited any political discrimination regarding WPA workers. Vague charges were bandied about at the time. The consensus of experts is that: “In the distribution of WPA project jobs as opposed to those of a supervisory and administrative nature politics plays only a minor in a comparatively insignificant role." However those who were hired were reminded at election time that FDR created their job and the Republicans would take it away. The great majority voted accordingly.

=== Decline and fall ===
After the end of the Great Depression around 1941, the next challenge was to keep Democratic majorities alive. It seemed impossible after the GOP landslide in 1946. Journalist Samuel Lubell found in his in-depth interviews of voters after the 1948 presidential election that Democrat Harry Truman, not Republican Thomas E. Dewey, seemed the safer, more conservative candidate to the "new middle class" that had developed over the previous 20 years. He wrote that "to an appreciable part of the electorate, the Democrats had replaced the Republicans as the party of prosperity."

In 1952 and 1956 Republican Dwight Eisenhower had been able to temporarily peel several elements of the coalition into the Republican column, notably some Northern farmers and manual workers and middle-class voters in the Border South. In the 1960 election, John F. Kennedy and his running mate Lyndon Johnson won back Southern voters.

After the smashing election victory of President Lyndon B. Johnson in 1964, the heavily Democratic Congress passed a raft of liberal legislation. Labor union leaders claimed credit for the widest range of liberal laws since the New Deal era, including the Civil Rights Act of 1964; the Voting Rights Act of 1965; the War on Poverty; aid to cities and education; increased Social Security benefits; and Medicare for the elderly. The 1966 elections were an unexpected disaster, with defeats for many of the more liberal Democrats. According to Alan Draper, the AFL-CIO Committee on Political Action (COPE) was the main electioneering unit of the labor movement. It ignored the White backlash against civil rights, which had become a main Republican attack point. The COPE assumed falsely that union members were interested in issues of greatest salience to union leadership, but polls showed this was not true as the members were much more conservative. The younger ones were much more concerned about taxes and crime, and the older ones had not overcome racial biases. Labor unions began to lose their members and influence in the 1970s as the economy became more service-oriented and the proportion of manufacturing jobs declined. Companies began relocating manufacturing jobs to Sun Belt states, free of labor union influences, and many Americans followed suit. As a result, union membership steadily declined. Labor unions were painted as corrupt, ineffective, and outdated by the Republican Party.

During the 1960s, issues as civil rights and racial integration, the Vietnam War and the counterculture of the 1960s, affirmative action, and large-scale urban riots further split the coalition and drove many Whites away, signalling that the coalition started to fall. The War in Vietnam split the liberal coalition into hawks (led by Johnson and Vice President Hubert Humphrey) and doves (led by Senators Eugene McCarthy and Robert Kennedy). In addition after the John F. Kennedy assassination, the coalition lacked a leader of the stature of Roosevelt. The closest was Lyndon B. Johnson (president 1963–1969), who tried to reinvigorate the old coalition but was unable to hold together the feuding components, especially after his handling of the Vietnam War alienated the emerging New Left. Besides Johnson, another who came closest was Robert Kennedy, the likely Democratic candidate in 1968. The assassinations of Martin Luther King and Robert Kennedy, in the space of just two months, seem to have been an almost fatal blow to the New Deal coalition prospects.

==== Reagan Era and the Southern Strategy ====
During the Presidency of Ronald Reagan (1981–1989), Republicans took control of prosperity issues, largely because of the poor performance of Jimmy Carter (1977–1981) in dealing with stagflation. Reagan's new economic policy of neoliberalism held that regulation was bad for economic growth and that tax cuts would bring sustained prosperity. In 1994, the Republicans scored a landslide victory, and swept control of Congress for the first time since 1952. The response of incumbent Democratic President Bill Clinton to the conservative wave was to adopt certain aspects of conservatism into the broader liberal platform, including an emphasis on fiscal conservatism and deregulation, through the process of "triangulation," leading to his 1996 State of the Union Address: “We know big government does not have all the answers. We know there's not a program for every problem....The era of big government is over.” Republican-designed bills, such as the Personal Responsibility and Work Opportunity Reconciliation Act of 1996, which cut back select New Deal-era programs, were signed into law under his presidency, as were laws that rolled-back banking regulations dating to the days of the Great Depression. Clinton largely accepted the neoliberal argument, thereby abandoning the New Deal coalition's claim to the prosperity issue.

While most Northerners supported the original civil rights movement, many conservative blue collar voters disliked the goal of racial integration and became fearful of rising urban crime. The Republicans, first under Richard Nixon, then later under Reagan, were able to corral these voters with promises to be tough on law and order. The votes of blue-collar workers contributed heavily to the Republican landslides of 1972 and 1984, and to a lesser extent 1980 and 1988. At the presidential level, the GOP made inroads among urban, middle-class White Southerners as early as 1928 and later in 1952. Starting in 1980, Reagan pulled together both middle-class and working-class White Southerners. At the state and local level the GOP made steady gains in both White groups until reaching majority status in most of the South by 2000.

Scholars debate exactly why the New Deal coalition collapsed so completely. Most emphasize a Southern Strategy by Republicans to appeal to a backlash against Democratic national support for civil rights. However, a minority of scholars consider a demographic change in addition to race. They argue that the collapse of cotton agriculture, the growth of a suburban middle class, and the large-scale arrival of Northern migrants outweighed the racist factor. Both viewpoints agree that the politicization of religious issues important to White Southern Protestants (i.e. opposition to abortion and LGBT rights) in the "Bible Belt" made for a strong Republican appeal.

== Components in 1930s ==
=== Third Parties ===
Roosevelt wanted a coalition that was broader than just the Democratic Party. He admired old Progressives now in the GOP, such as George W. Norris of Nebraska and Senator Robert M. La Follette Jr. of Wisconsin. He disliked the conservatism of Wisconsin Democrats and preferred to work with the Progressive Party there. The Farmer-Labor Party of Minnesota made an informal alliance with FDR and supported him in 1936; the Minnesota Democrats were a weak third party. The White House supported the Farmer-Labor Party (FLP) in Minnesota. Roosevelt had an informal deal with Governor Floyd B. Olson whereby the FLP would get some of the patronage, and in turn the FLP would work to block a third-party ticket against Roosevelt in 1936. The radical third parties declined rapidly after 1936 and no longer played a part in the New Deal coalition.

=== Pressure from the Left ===
As the economy began to improve in 1933–34, people loudly demanded faster action and pushed the New Dealers to the left. Labor strikes grew to large scale, especially in California and Minnesota. Textile workers launched the largest strike in national history in 1934. Senator Huey Long in Louisiana and radio priest Charles Coughlin, had both been active Roosevelt supporters in 1932. They now broke away and set up national appeals to millions of supporters, with talk of a third party to the left of Roosevelt in 1936. Long was assassinated but his followers did set up the Union Party that polled 2% of the vote in the 1936 United States presidential election. In California, Upton Sinclair, a famous novelist and socialist won the Democratic nomination for governor, on a left-wing ticket in 1934. His EPIC program promised to end poverty and unemployment by a setting up state-owned factories to hire the unemployed, and by increasing pensions for the elderly. Critics said it would flood the state with unemployed from everywhere else. Sinclair had a pension plan of his own and refused to endorse the Townsend Plan which had a strong following. The Republican candidate endorsed the Townsend Plan and won the movement's support. Sinclair was narrowly defeated by a combination of defections of prominent Democrats—including Roosevelt—as well as a massive smear campaign using Hollywood techniques and a blackout whereby all the state's newspapers opposed him and refused to cover his ideas. The Republican leadership realized the California electorate was moving left so it went along. Its 1934 platform endorsed not just the Townsend Plan but also the 30 hour work week, unemployment relief, and collective bargaining for all workers. The GOP wanted to win votes but in the process it legitimized a social welfare state as a bipartisan ideal. Consequently, the California experience helped push New Deal towards social welfare legislation, especially the WPA and Social Security. Sinclair's campaign gave aspiring Democratic leaders a boost, most notably Culbert Olson, who was elected governor in 1938. Needing an alternative to the New Deal's Social Security system, many Republicans around the country endorsed the Townsend Plan.

=== Class, ethnicity, and religion ===
In the northern states, class and ethnicity proved decisive factors in the New Deal coalition as shown by polling data in presidential and congressional elections from 1936 through 1968. Over the period, blue-collar workers averaged 63% Democratic voters. White collar workers, representing the middle class, averaged 43% Democratic. By religious affiliation over the period, while northern White Protestants averaged 58% Republican, White Catholics were 68% Democrats. Social class and religious affiliation had separate effects that could intersect, so that Catholic blue-collar workers were 76% Democratic, while Protestant blue-collar workers were only 52% Democratic. Throughout the period, better educated higher income middle-class voters tended to lean more towards Republicans, so that average Northern Protestant white collar voters were 69% Republican, while a Catholic counterpart was only 41% Republican. A dichotomy formed in the north between Catholic blue-collar workers forming the core of the Democratic Party, while Protestant businessmen, professionals, and clerical workers fell in with the GOP. A Gallup poll of listees in Who's Who in early 1936 showed that only 31% planned to vote for Roosevelt. Nationwide, Roosevelt won 36% of the votes of business and professional voters in 1940, 48% of lower-level white-collar workers, 66% of blue-collar workers, and 54% of farmers. Among various demographics, ethnicity was the strongest reliable identifier for Democrats that held together the New Deal coalition, listed below is the distribution of party identification in 1944 among the northern electorate:

Party identification in Northern cities, 1944	Democratic	Independent	Republican
All	32%	32%	36%
Irish	52%	27%	21%
Black	46%	20%	34%
Jewish	54%	35%	11%
Italian	52%	21%	27%

Roosevelt was successful in attracting further support from Italian, Black, and Jewish voters between 1936 and 1940.

Vote Shifting from 1936	Roosevelt in 1936	Landon in 1936	Undecided; non-voters in 1936
Italian for Willkie in 1940	2.8%	91.6%	5.6%
Italian for Roosevelt in 1940	64.4%	23.9%	11.7%
Jewish for Willkie in 1940	8.7%	91.2%	0.1%
Jewish for Roosevelt in 1940	88.2%	7.7%	4.1%
Black for Willkie in 1940	17.1%	73.2%	9.7%
Black for Roosevelt in 1940	72.6%	17.8%	9.6%

The coalition was strongest among Jews and Catholics and weakest among White Protestants.

1940 votes by religious denomination	% for FDR
All	55%
Jewish	87%
Catholic	73%
None given	51%
Protestant	45%
Source: Gallup Poll #294, #335.

=== Labor unions ===
The New Dealers made a major, successful effort to build up labor unions, especially through the National Labor Relations Act of 1935. In addition, Democratic-led state governments were much more favorable to unions than the pro-business Republicans had been. In 1940 FDR won 64% of non-union manual workers, 71% of AFL members, and 79% of CIO members. Union membership grew rapidly during World War II. In 1944 FDR won 56% of non-union manual workers, 69% of AFL members, and 79% of CIO members. Truman in 1948 had similar results. The more militant industrial unions, led by John L. Lewis formed the Congress of Industrial Organizations (CIO), and split off from the more traditional American Federation of Labor in 1938. Both federations added members rapidly, but they feuded bitterly. Both supported Roosevelt and the New Deal Coalition. The nationwide wave of labor strikes in 1937–38 alienated many voters, and the split weakened the New Deal coalition. The most controversial labor leader was John L. Lewis, head of the coal miners; he headed the CIO 1938–1941. Lewis was an isolationist and broke with Roosevelt and endorsed his Republican opponent in the 1940 election, a position demanded by the pro-Soviet far left element in the CIO. Nevertheless, CIO members voted for Roosevelt and Lewis was forced to leave the CIO, taking his United Mine Workers of America union along. Additionally, the coattails of labor candidates and the get-out-the-vote campaigns that were organized by labor unions were a reason for Truman moving ahead in the election of 1948 in many urban-industrial areas. This achievement was done despite Truman’s weaker showing, dragging behind the Democratic party’s congressional ticket by 4%.

=== City politics and machines ===
City Democratic machines had a new role to play. Traditionally the goal of winning power in the city was facilitated by keeping the vote low and under close watch. As part of the national New Deal coalition, the machines had to carry the state's electoral vote. That required turning out the largest possible majorities. They did this by converting some Republicans, mobilizing large numbers who had never voted before. Milton Rakove states: "Holding the South and delivering thumping majorities in the big cities of the North insured national hegemony for the Democratic party." The new majorities did not matter in the great 1936 landslide, but they were decisive in 1940. A third of the electorate lived in the 106 cities with a population of 100,000 or more. They were 61% for FDR. The South had a sixth of the electorate and FDR won 73%. The remaining half of the electorate—the non-metropolitan North—voted 53% for the Republican Wendell Willkie. The largest possible landslide was needed, and the city machines came through in 1940, 1944, and 1948. In the 1920s strong big city Republican machines were common. During the Great Depression their support plunged, and they were displaced by Democratic machines in Philadelphia, Pittsburgh, Chicago, St. Louis, and elsewhere. Across the urban North blacks deserted the GOP and were welcomed into the Democratic machine.

Ethnics and Catholics were concentrated in large cities, which gave them a more Democratic hue. The 103 largest cities with a population of 100,000 or more in 1950 were Democratic strongholds, typically with former machines that had faded away during and after World War II. The largest cities averaged 66% for FDR in 1932 and 1936, compared to 58% of the rest of the country. The cities dropped 5 points to 61% for FDR in 1940 and 1944, while the rest dropped 7 points to 51%.

== Group voting: 1948–1964 ==
Percentage of Democratic vote in major groups, presidency 1948–1964
Major Groups	1948	1952	1956	1960	1964
White	50	43	41	49	59
Black	71	77	61	68	94
College educated	22	34	31	39	52
High School educated	51	45	42	52	62
Grade School educated	64	52	50	55	66
Professional & Business	19	36	32	42	54
White collar	47	40	37	48	57
Manual worker	66	55	50	60	71
Farmer	60	33	46	48	53
Union member	76		51	62	77
Not union	42		35	44	56
Protestant	43	37	37	38	55
Catholic	62	56	51	78	76
Republican		8	4	5	20
Independent		35	30	43	56
Democrat		77	85	84	87
East	48	45	40	53	68
Midwest	50	42	41	48	61
West	49	42	43	49	60
South	53	51	49	51	52
All voters	50	45	42	50	61

Source: Gallup Polls in Gallup (1972)

== Legacy ==
The big-city machines faded away in the 1940s with a few exceptions that lingered a bit such as Albany and Chicago. Local Democrats in most cities were heavily dependent on the WPA for patronage; when it ended in 1943, there was full employment and no replacement patronage source was created. Furthermore, World War II brought such a surge of prosperity that the relief mechanism of the New Deal was no longer needed.

Labor unions crested in size and power in the 1950s but then went into steady decline. They continue to be major backers of the Democrats, but with so few members, they have lost much of their influence. From the 1960s into the 1990s, many jobs moved to the Sun Belt free of union influences, and the Republican Party frequently painted unions as corrupt and ineffective.

Intellectuals gave increasing support to Democrats since 1932. The Vietnam War, however, caused a serious split, with the New Left unwilling to support most of the Democratic presidential nominees. Since the 1990s, the growing number of Americans with a post-graduate degree have supported Democrats. In recent years, White Americans with a college degree have tended to support the Democratic Party, especially among younger voters, while non-college graduates are more likely to support the Republican Party—a reversal of the pattern before 2000.

White Southerners abandoned cotton and tobacco farming, and moved to the cities where the New Deal programs had much less impact. Beginning in the 1950s, the southern cities and suburbs started voting Republican. The White Southerners believed the support that northern Democrats gave to the Civil Rights Movement to be a direct political assault on their interests, which opened the way to protest votes for Barry Goldwater, who, in 1964, was the first Republican to carry the Deep South. Jimmy Carter and Bill Clinton lured many of the Southern Whites back at the level of presidential voting, but by 2000, White males in the South were 2–1 Republican and, indeed, formed a major part of the new Republican coalition. Since the 2010s, younger non-evangelical White Southerners with a college degree have been trending towards the Democratic Party, such as in Virginia, Georgia, and North Carolina.

Of the European immigrants came of age after the 1960s, Ronald Reagan pulled many of the working-class social conservatives into the Republican party as Reagan Democrats. Many middle-class ethnic minorities saw the Democratic Party as a working class party, and preferred the GOP as the middle class party. In addition, while many supported the 1964 Civil Rights Act, they were generally opposed to racial integration, and also supported the Republican stance against rising urban crime. However, the Jewish community has continued to vote largely Democratic: 74% voted for the Democratic presidential candidate in 2004, 78% in 2008, and 69% in 2012.

African Americans grew stronger in their Democratic loyalties and in their numbers. From the 1930s into the 1960s, black voters in the North began trending Democrat, while those in the South were largely disenfranchised. Following the Civil Rights Movement in the 1960s, black voters became a much more important part of the Democratic voter base. Their Democratic loyalties have cut across all income and geographic lines to form the single most unified bloc of voters in the country, with over 87% of black voters voting for the Democratic presidential candidate since 2008.

== See also ==
- Fifth Party System, 1930s–1970s
- Conservative coalition, opposition active by 1938
- Obama coalition, 21st century
- History of the United States Democratic Party
