= Edwin Markham House =

Historic site in Santa Clara County, California, United States

- Markham House
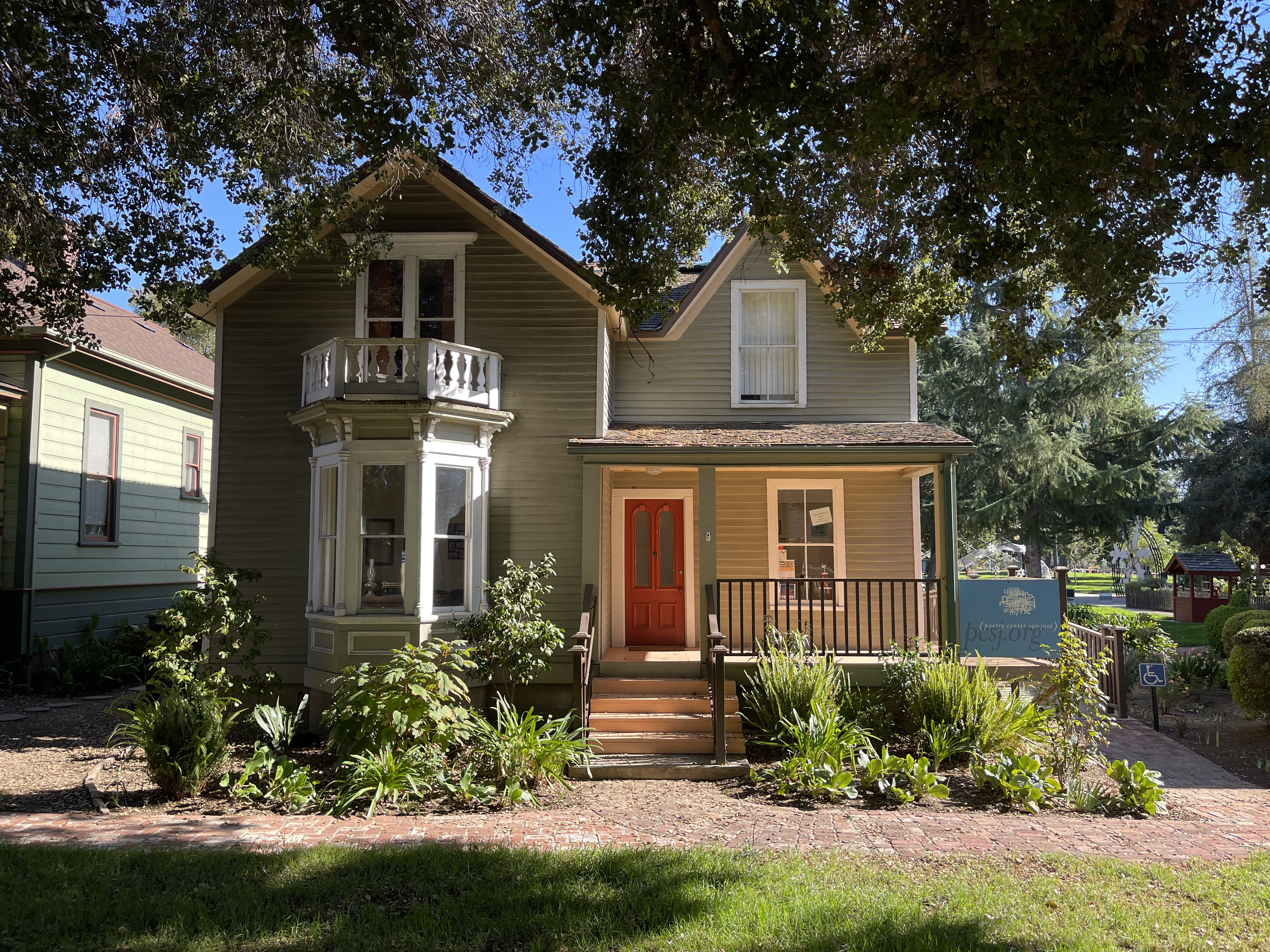
- Markham House within History Park

- Location in Santa Clara County
- 37°19′13″N 121°51′32″W
- Location: 635 Phelan Avenue, San Jose, California, US

History
- Founder: Edwin Markham
- Built: 1860s
- Built for: Edwin Markham
- Original use: Home

Site notes
- Website: www.pcsj.org/markham-house

California Historical Landmark
- Official name: Home of Edwin Markham
- Designated: January 6, 1949
- Reference no.: 416

The Edwin Markham House is a historic home located within San Jose's Kelley Park, at History Park in San Jose, California. It was once the residence of American poet Edwin Markham, who journeyed to California with his mother in 1844. He wrote the poem The Man with the Hoe, while living at the Markham House. The California Historical Landmark No. 416 plaque is located at 432 South Eighth Street in San Jose, marking the spot where the original home once stood.

== History ==
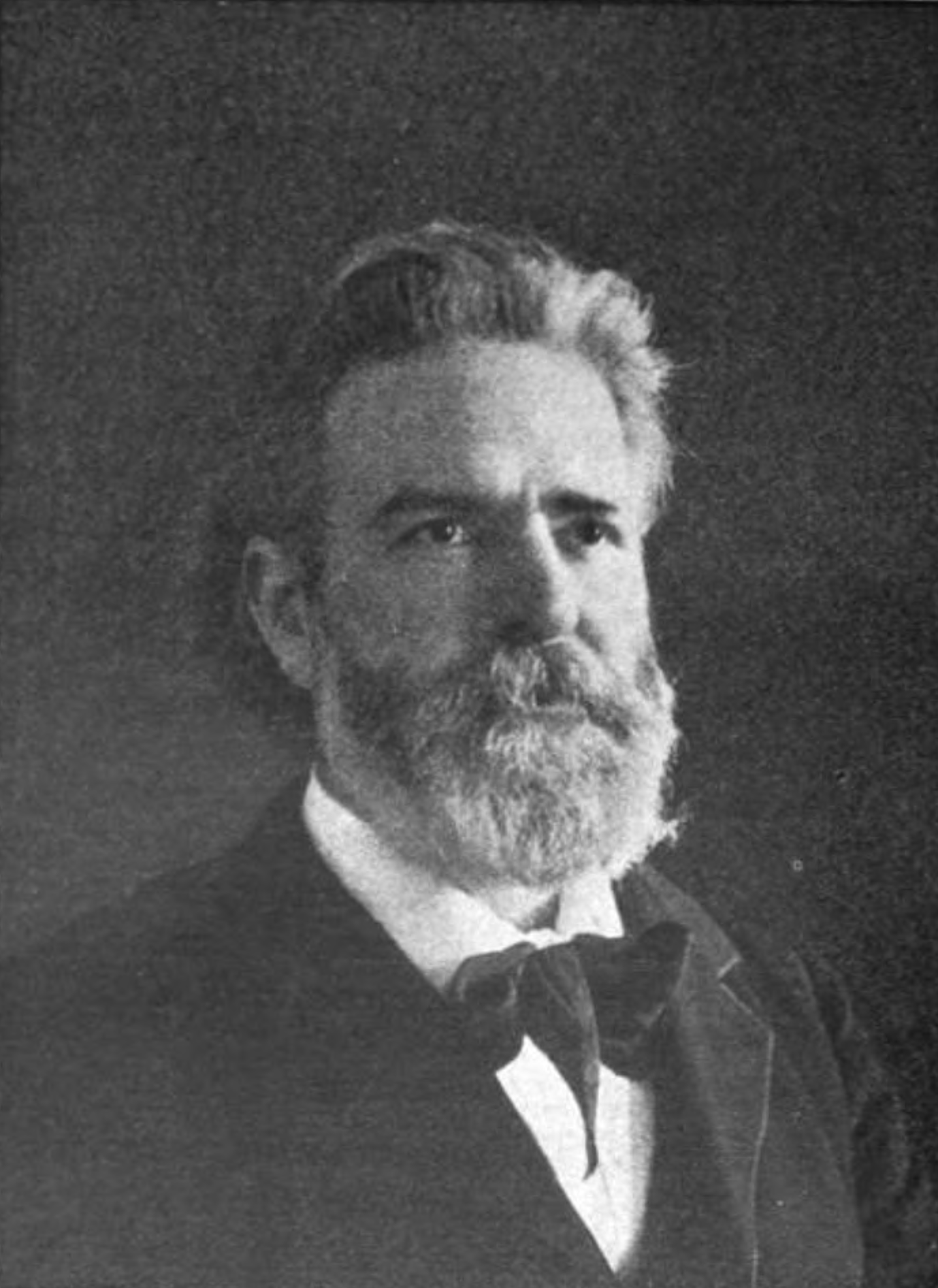
Edwin Markham (1852–1940).

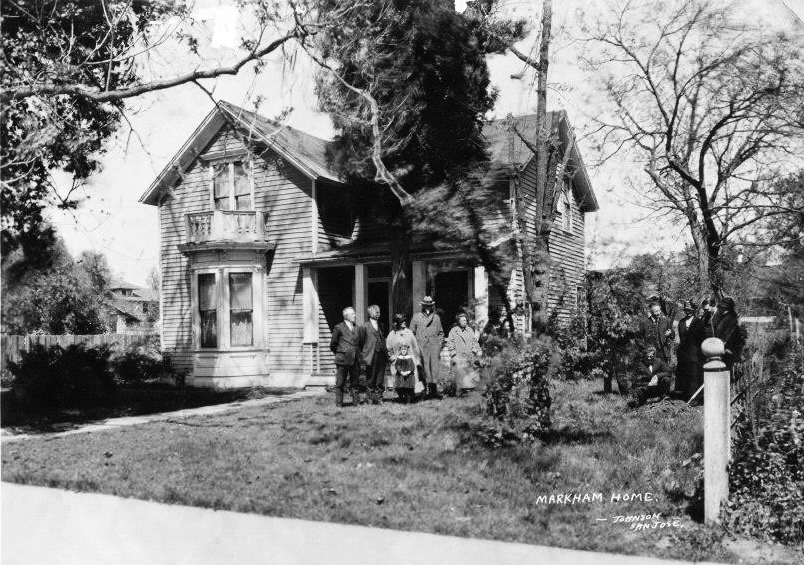
Edwin Markham house with people in the picture include: Edwin Markham and Henry Meade Bland.

Edwin Markham (1852–1940) was an American poet born in Oregon City, Oregon on April 23, 1852. He came to California in a covered wagon with his mother in 1856. He constructed the Greek Revival-style Markham House in the 1860s. The Markham House originally stood at 432 South Eighth Street within the San Jose State University grounds. Markham, is celebrated for his poem The Man with the Hoe, that he wrote in 1899 while still living at the Markham House.

In the 1870s, Markham's mother acquired the Markham House with the intention of being close to her son as he pursued his studies at San José Normal School (now San José State University). Markham was a member of the first graduating class in 1872. He continued to reside in the house as his primary residence until 1889. After graduation, he became a teacher and then elected county superintendent of schools.

Inspired by the global recognition of the poet, students and faculty at San José State University came together to establish the Edwin Markham Landmark Association, hosting their meetings in the poet's former residence. In 1920, the university acquired the property, and during the 1920s, the university repurposed it as an Edwin Markham heath cottage. Subsequently, for two decades, it functioned as the residence of the San José Center for Poetry and Literature.

In February 1987, the Markham house was relocated from its original site at 432 South Eighth Street within the San José State University grounds to History Park in San José, where it now serves as the Poetry Center San José. Extensive renovated and restoration work have been carried out to preserve its historical significance.

In March 2002, the newly refurbished Markham House was dedicated with the return of Poetry Center San José to the Markham House with a ceremony led by Dana Gioia, chair of the National Endowment for the Arts. Presently, the house serves as a writing resource center, providing workshops, open readings, children's writing activities, and a library. The first floor has an exhibit showcasing Edwin Markham memorabilia. Inside the resource room, is Markham's original bookcase, now home to a collection of poetry books for children. This assortment includes classics, recent publications, and reference materials. The second floor serves as administrative space, library, reading and writing room.

Inside the house is the Edwin Markham Exhibit that has a display of artifacts that includes Markham's poems, his cane, an original signed copy of Markham's poem, The Man with the Hoe, which drew inspiration from Jean-François Millet's painting depicting the toiling peasant, and a miniature book from the 1920s. Additionally, there is a framed photograph of Markham alongside his close friends Jack London, Joaquin Miller, and Ina Coolbrith. These items collectively show Markham's career and his impact on the world of poetry.

== Landmark status ==
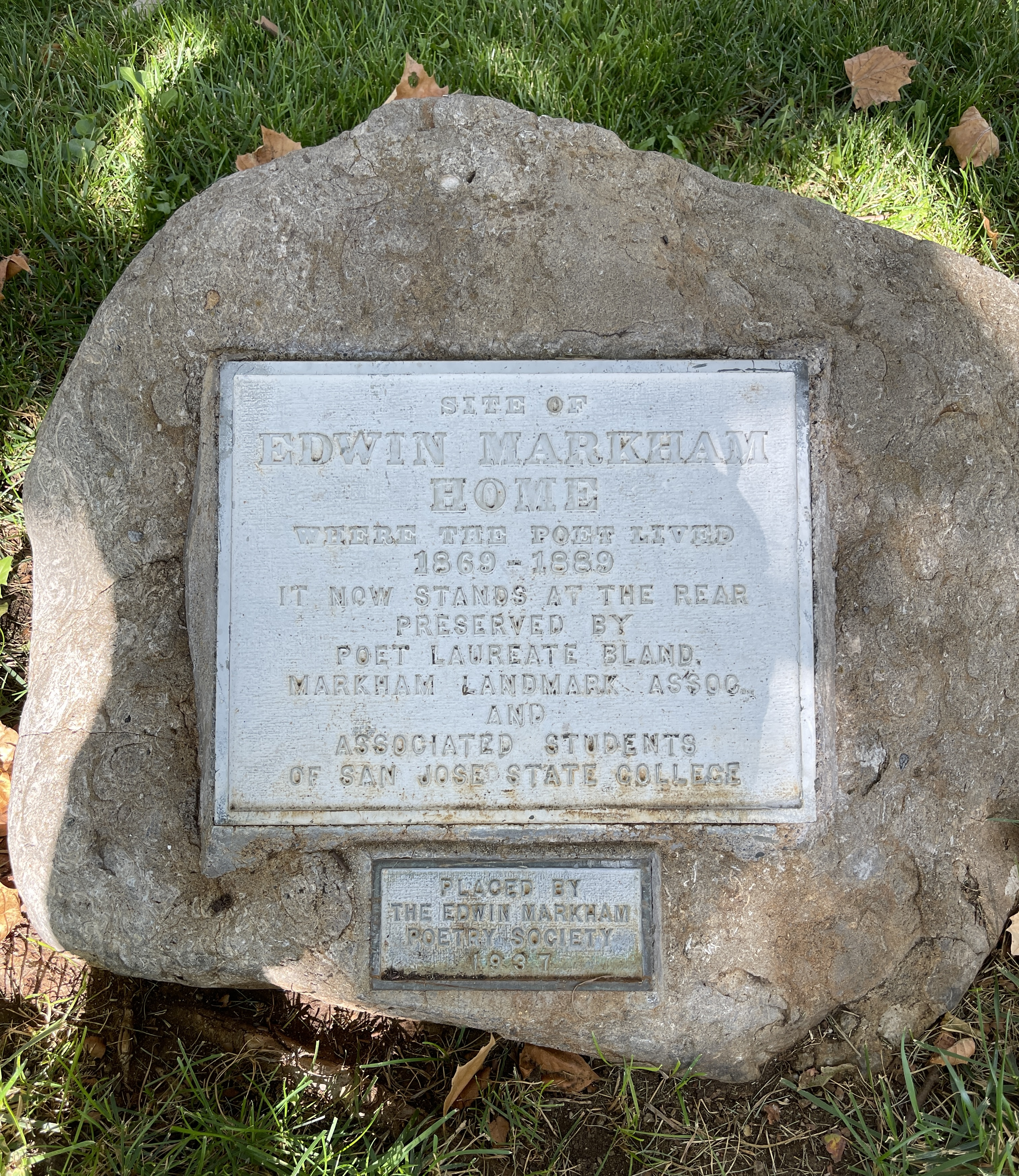
Edwin Markham Home Plaque

The registration for the Edwin Markham House as a California Historical Landmark No. 416 dates back to January 6, 1949. In 1937, the Edwin Markham Poetry Society erected a commemorative plaque, that designates the site of the Edwin Markham Home. The marker is located at the original homesite at 432 South Eighth Street, San José. The inscription on the plaque reads:

Site of Edwin Markham Home where the poet lived 1869-89. It now stands at the rear preserved by Poet Laureate Bland. Markham Landmark Association and Associated Students of San Jose State College.

== See also ==
- California Historical Landmarks in Santa Clara County
