= Women's suffrage in Wyoming =

Women's suffrage in a U.S. state

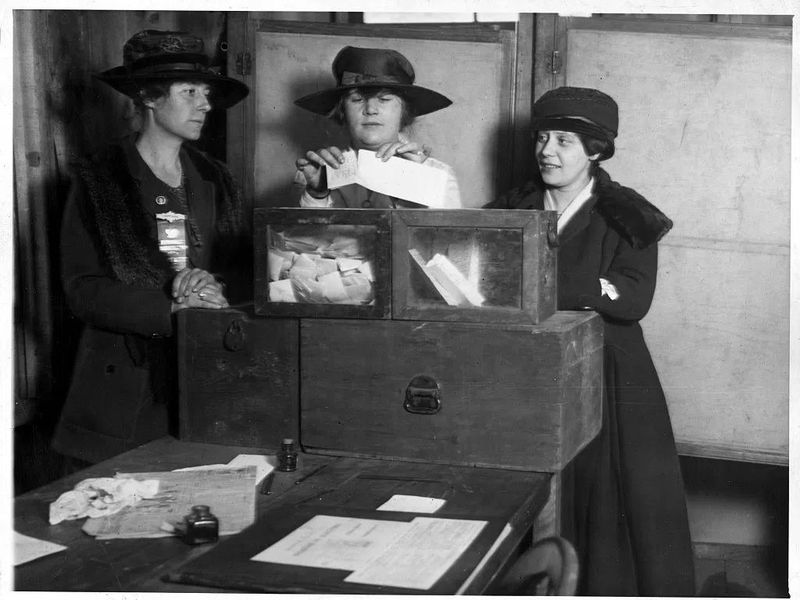
Women voting in 1917.

Wyoming was the first State to incorporate women's suffrage, although women in the Territory of Utah voted first. Other jurisdictions had already given limited suffrage to women who met various property qualifications. A U.S. territory in 1869, Wyoming's first territorial legislature voted to give women the right to vote and to hold public office. A legislature made entirely of men passed the woman's suffrage bill in 1869 entitled An Act to Grant to the Women of Wyoming Territory the Right of Suffrage, and to Hold Office. The territory retained its woman suffrage law even when that law could have jeopardized the Wyoming Territory's application for statehood. In 1890, Wyoming became the first U.S. state allowing its woman citizens to vote.

== Historical background ==
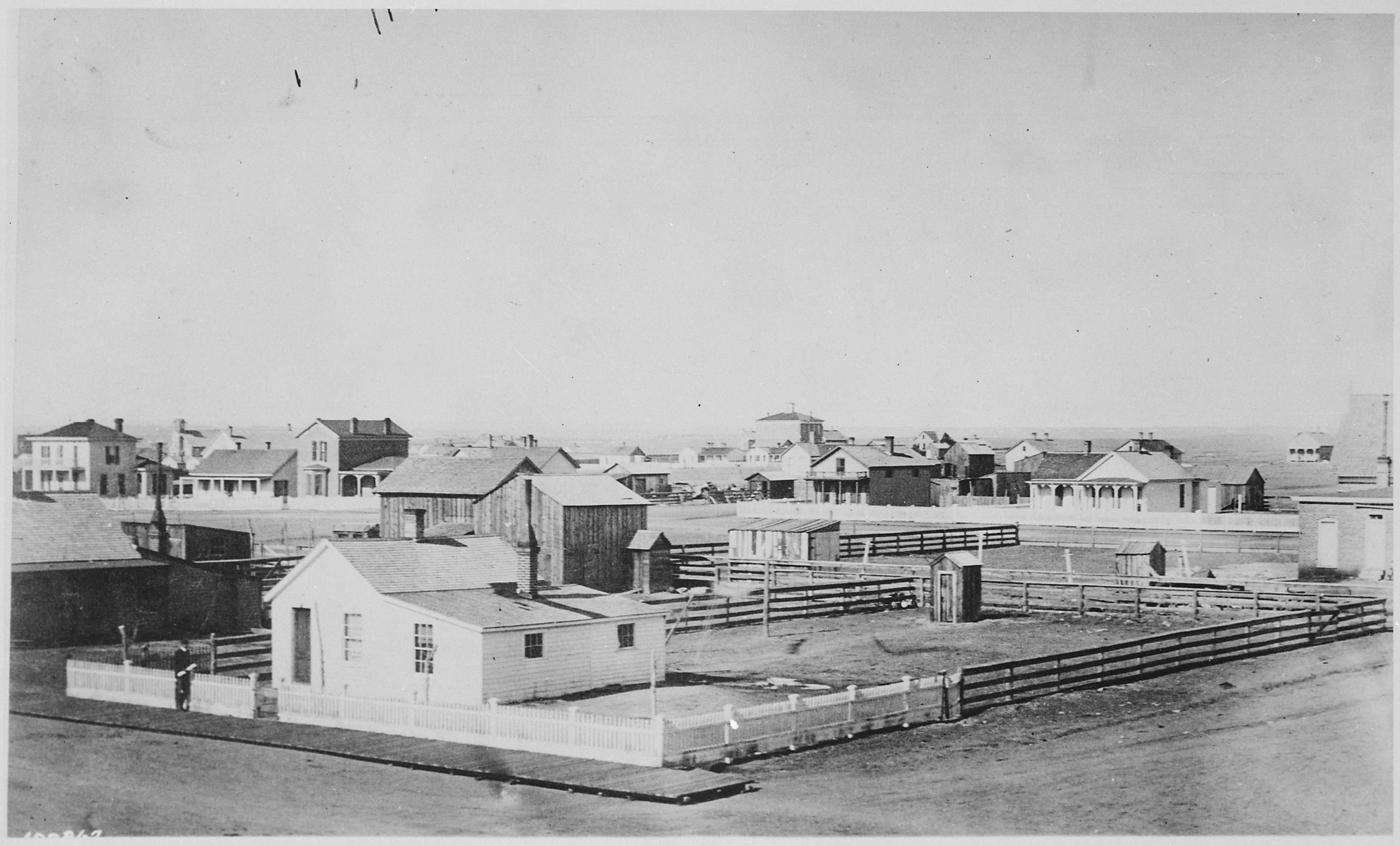
Cheyenne, Wyoming where the first territorial legislature met and voted to allow women to vote and hold office in December 1869.

The push for suffrage in Wyoming began when Wyoming was still part of the Dakota Territory. In 1867, completion of the Union Pacific Railroad and the South Pass gold rush resulted in thousands of settlers pouring into western Dakota Territory. Wyoming Territory emerged just south of the mountains where the gold rush occurred. The new Territory included South Pass, the slow up and downhill rise where people crossed the continental divide for thousands of years along the Sweetwater River. Initially, the Sweetwater camps were located in Carter County, Dakota Territory, with South Pass City as the county seat. These new mining towns grew quickly and were along the path of the Union Pacific Railroad that used South Pass but was still being built. Dakota Territory agreed to cede its western lands to form Wyoming Territory.

South Pass City remained the seat for the county that would be renamed Sweetwater several months later. Since most of the early miners hoped to strike it rich and quickly leave, they had little interest in governance or community services such as street repairs, indigent care, or schools. Attempts to erect a jail in South Pass City were defeated twice in special elections. The arrival of businesses and the first families in 1868 brought some stability, for these residents wanted to transform the South Pass gold camps into permanent towns. Because Wyoming was a territory, all officials were appointed, including the governor, county commissioners, county attorneys, justices of the peace, and town constables.

Wyoming legislators were aware of the discussion over woman suffrage, for many of them had moved from Midwestern states where the reform had been debated for several years. In 1867, even with enormous pressure from women activists and a huge national effort, Kansas legislators failed to pass a law giving women the vote. Early in 1869, Dakota Territory came within one vote of passing a so-called woman suffrage bill. In Congress, a senator introduced a bill after the Civil War to give women in all the territories the right to vote. This failed, too, as did bills in 1868 that would have amended the U.S. Constitution to give all women in the United States and territories the right to vote. Those failures led many advocates to believe the first woman suffrage bill would probably be adopted in a territory. Territories only required a majority vote of the legislature and the governor's signature for passage of a suffrage bill. States, on the other, required a constitutional amendment to add women suffrage. That process required a 60% vote in both houses, the governor's acceptance, and the approval of the people in a special election.

Even so, Wyoming's territorial legislature, made up entirely of men, had to be persuaded that votes for women were a good idea. In addition to men willing to consider allowing women to vote, local women activists worked on behalf of the issue. Two women had recently delivered speeches in Cheyenne in support of woman suffrage: Anna Dickinson at the courthouse in the fall, and Redelia Bates to new legislators in November. However, neither of the national woman suffrage organizations nor any grassroots movement in Wyoming lobbied for the passage of woman suffrage in the territory.

== First legislature and the suffrage bill, 1869 ==
Before the Wyoming delegates assembled in Cheyenne in October 1869, woman suffrage bills in three Western legislatures had been narrowly defeated—Washington in 1854, Nebraska in 1856, and Dakota in 1869—and Utah and Colorado lawmakers would soon be considering the issue. In the years after the Civil War, the two major political parties had battled over expanding voting rights. A particularly fierce battle over suffrage for women and for Black men emerged in Kansas, where national suffrage organizations invested a lot of time and money. The effort failed in 1867 when the new state legislature, mostly Republican, voted down woman suffrage, but supported suffrage for black men. The Republican Party had made suffrage for black men the heart of its political activity, but not all voters supported their views. During the Civil War, northern Democrats were uncertain that the killing was worth the cost. Many would have preferred some kind of compromise with the South instead of the pursuit of the fight to the bloody end. After the war, Democrats continued to oppose some of the most important changes the war had brought about. In particular, they opposed full citizenship and voting rights for black people—both the recently freed slaves and northern blacks who had been more or less free already.

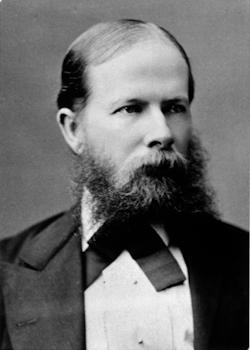
John Allen Campbell was the first territorial governor to sign a woman's suffrage bill into law. He was appointed by General Ulysses Grant to serve in 1868.

In the fall of 1868, the popular Union Army General, Ulysses S. Grant, a Republican, was elected president. Grant soon appointed many loyal Republicans to run the brand-new Wyoming Territory. His appointees included the governor, John A. Campbell, Secretary of State Edward M. Lee, and the Attorney General Joseph M. Carey, the top government lawyer in the state. They arrived in May 1869. Not long afterward, Carey issued an official legal opinion that no one in Wyoming could be denied the right to vote based on race. The federal law that eventually created the territory in 1868 banned voting and officeholding discrimination on the basis of race.

Many Democrats saw Carey's opinion as a move to make sure Wyoming's black people voted Republican and the issue continued to be controversial. When a territory-wide election was held in early September only Democrats were elected. The territory's new delegate to Congress was a Democrat, and all 22 members of the new territorial legislature were Democrats. One of those Democrats, William Bright, a saloonkeeper at South Pass City in what became Wyoming Territory, lobbied hard for Wyoming Territory to become the first government in the world to guarantee women the right to vote.

These legislators, all white and male, had a number of reasons for supporting women's suffrage when they met for the first time in October 1869. They passed a resolution allowing women to sit inside the special space where the lawmakers sat. They passed a law guaranteeing that teachers—most of whom were women—would be paid the same whether they were men or women. And they passed a bill guaranteeing married women property rights separate from their husbands. They were willing to go even further to get Wyoming good publicity that would draw more settlers to the new territory. Positive news stories published throughout the nation, legislators thought, might also bring more women. There were six adult men in the Territory for every adult woman, and there were very few children. American Indians were not counted in these numbers, but Chinese workers—most of whom had come to work on the railroad—and black people were counted. Another reason was based on race, that if black males were to have to the vote, then women—and especially white women—should have it, too. In the spring following the passing of the act, a Cheyenne newspaper reported this as “the clincher” argument.

Their decision was also about party politics. Democrats in the legislature hoped that once these women came to Wyoming, they would continue to vote for the party that had given them the vote in the first place. Democrats in the Legislature wanted to make John Campbell, the Republican governor, look bad. As a man who publicly supported rights for ex-slaves, they hoped to push him too far with a vote for women. If they passed the bill, many assumed, Campbell would veto it. The bill passed the Legislative Council six votes to two. In the House, lawmakers tried and failed to attach various amendments. Some potential amendments were attempts to make the bill so unattractive to other legislators that it would fail. One such amendment, which failed, would have extended the vote to “all colored women and squaws." The House raised the voting age for women from 18 to 21. The House then passed the woman suffrage bill seven votes to four, with one abstention. Governor Campbell took several days deciding what to do. He signed the bill into law Dec. 10, 1869. By the end of the century, Wyoming was one of four U.S. states that fully enfranchised their women, among Colorado, Utah, and Idaho.

== First women voters and officeholders, 1870 and 1871 ==
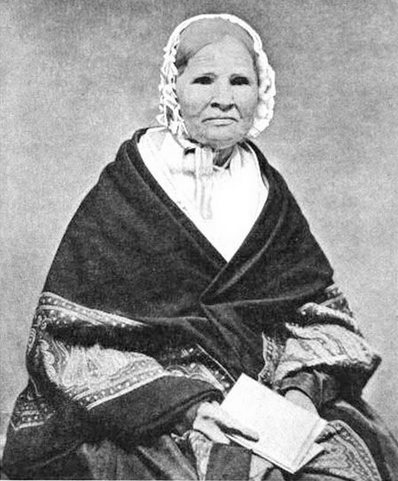
In 1870, Louisa Swain was one of the first women to vote in Wyoming Territory. She lived and voted in Laramie, Wyoming.

In September 1870, women throughout the Territory finally got the chance to vote in Wyoming's second election. As many as 1,000 women appear to have gone to the polls. African-American women in Cheyenne were also able to vote. To the disgust of the Democrats who had given them the vote, a great many voted Republican. A Republican was elected territorial representative to Congress. And the following year, 1871, a few Republicans were elected to the legislature. Wyoming did not stop there. Within a few months, the territory had sworn in the country's first female jurors and appointed three of the first female justices of the peace. The governor also appointed several women as notaries public during this time. In 1870 and 1871, Amalia Post and other women served on juries in Laramie.

The first female justice of the peace was Esther Hobart Morris. Morris and her family arrived in South Pass City late in 1869. Esther Morris had hardly settled in her new home in South Pass City when District Court Judge John W. Kingman appointed her as justice of the peace in 1870 to complete the term of Judge J.W. Stillman. Morris, several times widowed and an activist for abolition, had experience in solving problems and serving her community. After some prodding, Morris subsequently completed an application for the post and submitted the required $500 bond. The Sweetwater County Board of Commissioners in a vote of two to one approved her application on 14 February 1870. Over the eight months, Morris adjudicated 70 cases and only two were overturned.

There was pushback to women in such roles. The new legislature decided votes for women weren't such a good idea after all, however, and passed a bill to repeal the 1869 law. To his credit, Gov. Campbell vetoed the repeal. The House came up with the two-thirds vote necessary to override his veto, but the Council fell one vote short. That left the new law standing. However, female jury duty, which some people believed took women away from their families, exposed them to unseemly testimony and put them in close quarters with male jurors, was among the most controversial outcomes of Wyoming's new law. Although the Suffrage Act was initially interpreted to allow and even require that women serve on juries, women were barred from jury service in 1871, less than two years after the practice had begun.

== Statehood and woman suffrage, 1890 ==
By the time Wyoming petitioned to become a state, its residents had gotten good press from their support of woman suffrage. Women's rights organizations in other western states looked to Wyoming as a model. Women had held office in a range of capacities. In 1880, Susan Johnson was appointed postmaster in Cheyenne and Mary Bellamy became the first woman to serve in a state legislature. Wyoming women exercised their right to vote: in the 1880s nearly 90% of Wyoming women voted. Women like Esther Hobart Morris, Amalia Post and Theresa Jenkins who worked hard in Wyoming and at national suffrage meetings to ensure woman's suffrage would remain the law. By 1890, when Wyoming had enough population to become a state, Wyoming residents petitioned Congress with a constitution that included suffrage for women. However, the U.S. Congress pushed back. The Wyoming delegation present in D.C. telegraphed the territorial legislature that woman suffrage had become an obstacle delaying their statehood application. The legislature, via a telegram from Joseph M. Carey (who later became governor of Wyoming), replied, "We will stay out of the Union a hundred years rather than come in without our women." With a very close vote of 139 to 127, Wyoming Territory was granted admission as a state with suffrage for women. Utah Territory had petitioned for statehood with women's suffrage several times earlier, but its statehood had been denied and women's suffrage had been revoked in 1887. In the end, when Wyoming became the 44th state it was the very first state to achieve suffrage. Several western states quickly followed Wyoming's lead, but some legislators worried about the consequences that promoting women's suffrage would have on their bids for statehood.

Wyoming ratified the Nineteenth Amendment on January 27, 1920.

== See also ==
- List of Wyoming suffragists
- Women's suffrage in states of the United States
- Women's suffrage in the United States
