= California Poet Laureate =

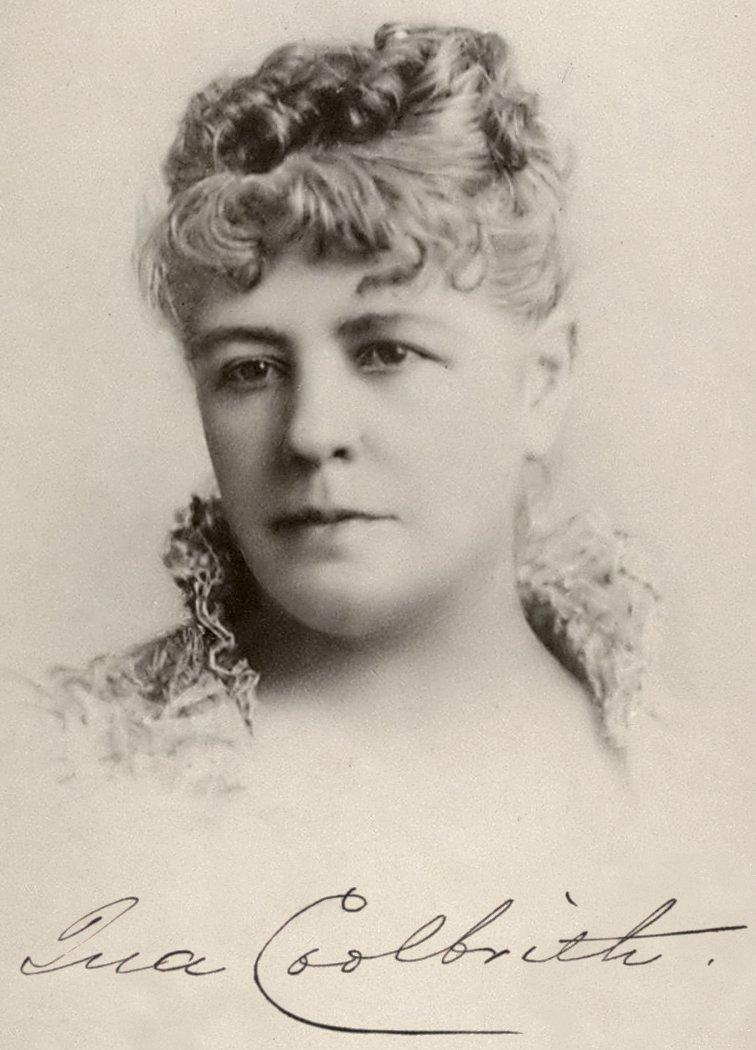
Ina Coolbrith was the first poet laureate.

The California Poet Laureate is the poet laureate for the state of California. In 2001, Governor Gray Davis created the official position. Each poet laureate for the State of California is appointed by the Governor of California for a term of two years and must be confirmed by the senate. Previous to Governor Davis' action in creating the position, the title was unofficial and the position was held for life. The program is run by the California Arts Council.

== Poets laureate ==
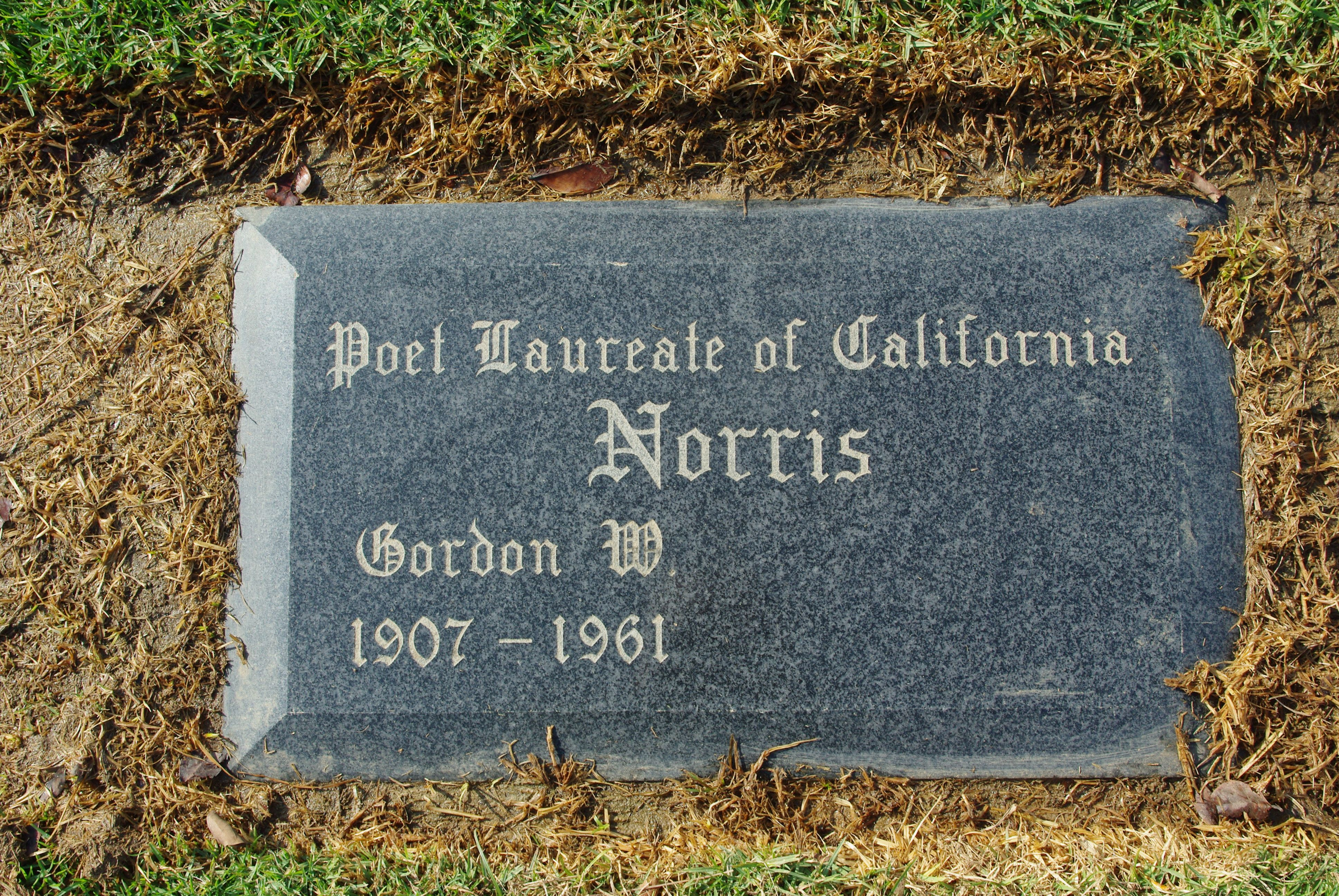
Grave marker in Inglewood Park Cemetery for Gordon W. Norris

- Ina Donna Coolbrith, appointed on June 30, 1915. Held the title until her death in 1928.

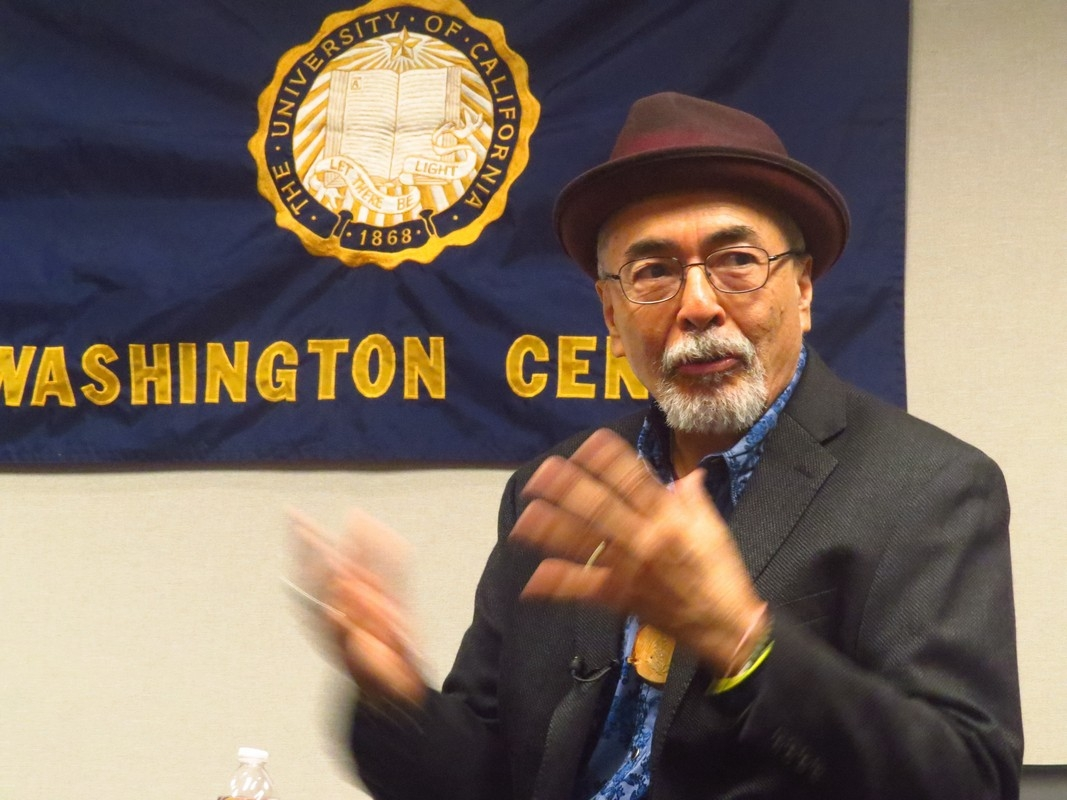
Juan Felipe Herrera, Poet Laureate of California and later of the United States

- Henry Meade Bland, 1929–1931
- John Steven McGroarty, 1933–1944
- Gordon W. Norris, 1953–1961
- Charles B. Garrigus, 1966–2000
- Quincy Troupe, June 11, 2002 – October 2002.
- Al Young, May 12, 2005 – 2008
- Carol Muske-Dukes, November 14, 2008 – 2011
- Juan Felipe Herrera, March 21, 2012 – 2014
- Dana Gioia, December 4, 2015 – 2018
- Lee Herrick, November 18, 2022 – Present

== See also ==
- List of U.S. state poets laureate
- List of poetry awards
- List of American literary awards
- List of municipal poets laureate in California
- United States Poet Laureate
