= List of Wyoming suffragists =

List of suffragists and groups from or who worked in Wyoming

This is a list of Wyoming suffragists, suffrage groups and others associated with the cause of women's suffrage in Wyoming.

== Suffragists ==
- Grace Raymond Hebard.
- Therese A. Jenkins.
- Esther Hobart Morris.
- Amalia Post.
- Louisa Swain.

== Suffragists who campaigned in Wyoming ==
- Susan B. Anthony.
- Redelia Bates.
- Harriot Stanton Blatch.
- Anna Elizabeth Dickinson.
- Inez Milholland.
- Anita Pollitzer.

== See also ==
- Women's suffrage in Wyoming
- Women's suffrage in states of the United States
