= Man with a Hoe =

Jean-François Millet painting, 1860–62

- French: L'homme à la houe
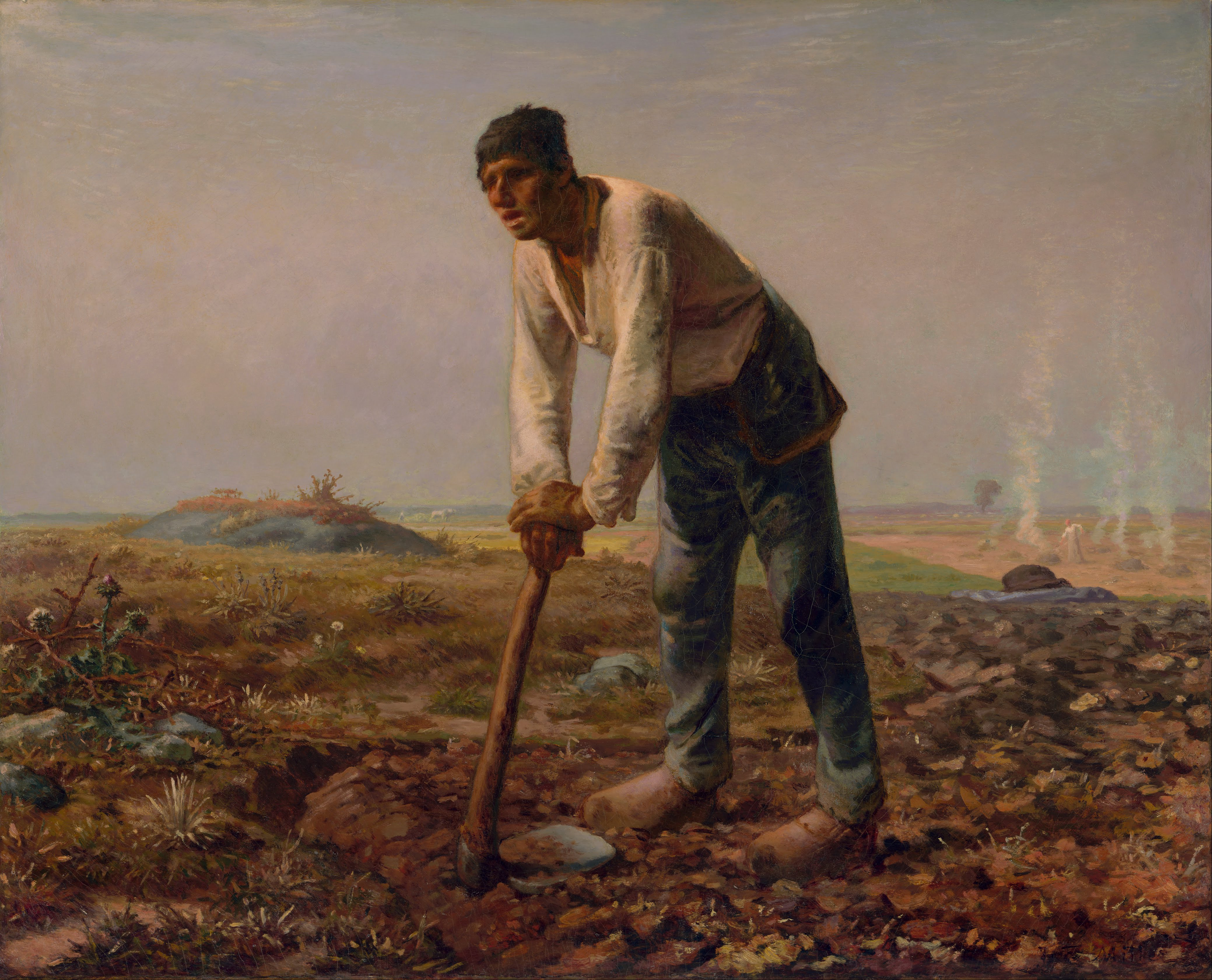
- Artist: Jean-François Millet
- Year: 1860–1862
- Medium: oil on canvas
- Dimensions: 81.9 cm × 100.3 cm (32.2 in × 39.5 in)
- Location: J. Paul Getty Museum, Los Angeles
- Website: Getty object 85.PA.114

Man with a Hoe (French: L'homme à la houe), sometimes called The Labourer, is a painting by the French Realist painter Jean-François Millet, created 1860–1862. It is held in the J. Paul Getty Museum, in Los Angeles. Man With a Hoe depicts a weary agricultural worker with blunt facial features and rustic clothing taking a moment of rest as he struggles to clear stones and pernicious weeds from a farm field.

== History ==
L'homme à la houe was first exhibited at the salon of the Academie des Beaux-Arts in Paris in 1863. The immediate response from several critics was wrath; Paul Saint-Victor notably wrote, "He lights his lantern and looks for a cretin; he must have searched for a long time before finding his peasant leaning on a hoe...There is no gleam of human intelligence in this animal. Has he just come from working? Or from murdering?" Saint-Victor is believed to have been comparing the subject of the painting to French serial killer Martin Dumollard.

Man with a Hoe was deliberately provocative in its aesthetic if not its politics; "in which he made a clean sweep of everything that could possibly please, and displayed his roughness absolutely bare. It was, as he said himself, the sheer 'cry of the earth' in all its savage reality." The inclusion of thistles and thorns in the left foreground is said to be suggestive of "barrenness, toil, pain and the Passion of the Christ." The Man with a Hoe was the last painting of Millet's so-called "radical" era, which began with The Sower (1850).

After the initial shock of the new, Man with a Hoe lived a quiet life until the 1880s when it re-emerged as a star of three major French exhibitions including the art show at the 1889 World's Fair in Paris.

Ethel Sperry Crocker, wife of William H. Crocker, bought the painting in 1891 and brought it to the United States. The price was said to be 700,000 French francs or US$125,000 (equivalent to about $4,374,537 in 2024). The Crockers' butler, Mr. Head, saved the painting from the 1906 San Francisco earthquake and fire that destroyed the Crockers' Nob Hill home. The Getty Museum purchased it from Crocker's heirs in 1985.

== Influence ==
Along with Woman Pasturing Her Cow and The Gleaners, Man With a Hoe is a Millet painting that casts "a critical light on the conditions of rural labor under the Second Empire and explains [Millet's] sometimes marginal status in the regime's fine arts institutions."

The painting has long been seen to have a political and/or philosophical subtext. American critic Ednah Dow Cheney in 1867, in her consideration of the painting's respect for physical labor and the working class generally, wrote, "It stirs the soul with every great problem of life and thought. We would have soon as trusted Garrison or Wendell Phillips to lecture in Charleston before the war as have placed...The Laborer at the mercy of slave holders." In 1908 Gutzon Borglum and Walter Winans wrote that it was not a man with a hoe so much as a "MAN, HANDICAPPED, battling with nature for food, which nature will only yield to him through eternal conflict."

According to the critic Robert Hughes, Millet's Man With a Hoe, The Gleaners, The Sower, and The Angelus were collectively "the most popular works of art in the new age of mass production, disseminated by millions of engravings, postcards, knickknacks and parodies. The Sower became the Mona Lisa of socialism, but it served capitalism equally well as the corporate emblem of its owners, the Provident National Bank in Philadelphia."

The painting inspired Edwin Markham's 1898 poem "The Man With the Hoe."
