= Zaruhi =

Zaruhi (Armenian: Զարուհի) is an Armenian feminine given name that may refer to

- Zarouhie Abdalian (born 1982), American artist
- Zaruhi Babayan (born 1975, Armenian singer
- Zaruhi Bahri (1880–1958), Armenian writer
- Zaruhi Batoyan (born 1979), Armenian government official, activist
- Zari Elmassian (1906–1990) American singer
- Zaruhi Kalemkaryan (1871–1971), prose writer, essayist, poet, and philanthropist of Armenian descent
- Zaruhi Kavaljian (1877–1969), Armenian physician in Turkey
- Zaruhi Postanjyan (born 1972), Armenian Member of Parliament
