= Henry Bland =

Henry Bland may refer to:

- Henry Bland (priest) (c.1677–1746), English cleric and provost of Eton College
- Henry Flesher Bland (1818–1898), Methodist minister
- Harry Bland (1898–1960), English footballer
- Sir Henry Bland (public servant) (1909–1997), Australian public servant
- Henry Meade Bland (1863–1931), California educator and poet
