= Laura L. Whitlock =

American cartographer

Laura L. Whitock
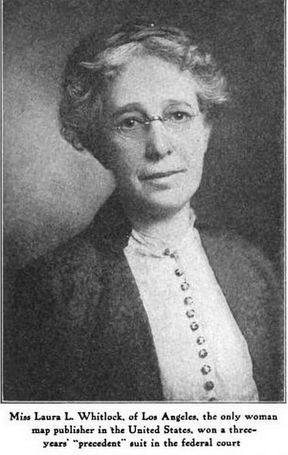
- Laura L. Whitlock, from a 1918 publication
- Born: 1862; Iowa, USA
- Died: 1934 (aged 71–72)
- Resting place: Inglewood Park Cemetery, California
- Occupations: Cartographer, map publisher, and travel professional

Laura L. Whitlock (1862–1934) was an American cartographer, map publisher, and travel professional.

== Early life ==
Whitlock was born in Iowa, and moved with her mother Phoebe A. Whitlock from Nebraska to Los Angeles in 1895. She was trained as a music teacher.

== Career ==
Whitlock worked as an "excursion agent" and tour guide soon after her arrival in California, organizing and leading trips to the Colorado River and the Grand Canyon in 1895 and 1896, among other destinations. She opened a "travel and hotel bureau" in 1903, in downtown Los Angeles. She was president of the Pacific Coast Travel Club in 1907. She also ran a card catalog registry and information bureau for Shriners visiting Los Angeles for a national conference in 1907.

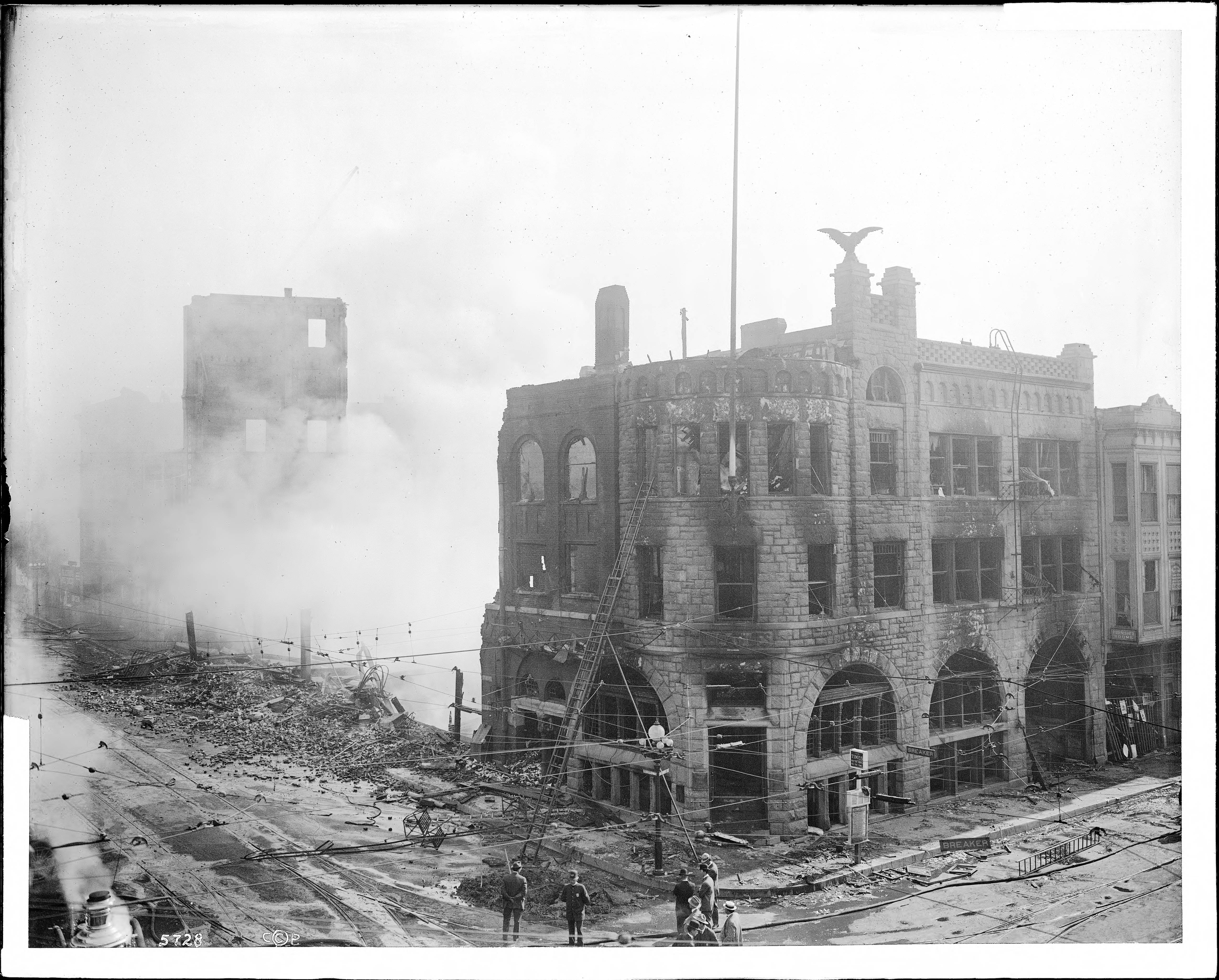
Los Angeles Times building, after the bombing disaster on October 1, 1910 (CHS-5728)

She had an office in the Los Angeles Times building when it was bombed in 1910, which damaged some of her work in progress. She nonetheless published an extraordinarily detailed "The Official Transportation and City Map" for Los Angeles in 1911, "the only map containing exclusive electric railway data, as the electric railway officers give no data to other publishers."

Her maps were frequently copied without permission, and she was diligent in her efforts to seek legal remedy. Printer N. Bowditch Blunt was criminally convicted for copying Whitlock's maps—the first criminal conviction for copyright violation in the United States. Whitlock also brought a lawsuit against the Los Angeles Map and Address Company and the Security Savings Bank for copyright infringement when they sold unauthorized copies of her map. In 1918 she sued the city engineer of Los Angeles, alleging that he had copperplates made from some of her maps without her permission; the matter settled out of court.

== Personal life ==
Whitlock died in 1934; her gravesite is in Inglewood Park Cemetery.
