= Gordon W. Norris =

American poet

Gordon William Norris (died December 17, 1961) was an American poet who served as California Poet Laureate from 1953 until his death.

== Early life ==
Norris was born in Redlands, California. His father Matthew Tyler Norris was born within the Mission San Gabriel Arcángel in San Gabriel. His mother Ann Wolliscroft was born in Worth County, Iowa. He had a brother named Lorain D. Norris.

Norris was educated at schools in the Imperial Valley and Big Creek.

== Writing career ==
In 1949, Norris released a book called Golden Empire to celebrate the centennial of California. It was the inspiration for a float by the Native Daughters and Native Sons of the Golden West in the 1954 Rose Parade. Norris himself was present on the float.

Due to his publication of Golden Empire, Norris was appointed California Poet Laureate on 9 June, 1953. He published only two books of poetry during his life.

== Personal life ==
Norris was married to a woman named Ellen M., and had two stepchildren.

Norris was arrested in April 1959 on drugs charges, after being found in possession of a large numbers of pills while driving. He stated that the pills were the result of a heart attack he suffered after visiting the Grand Canyon, but was released with a $500 bail for driving under the influence of drugs. Norris pleaded not guilty to the charge, and was later fined $100 for the incident as a misdemeanour.

Norris died on December 17, 1961, in a car crash near Blythe. He was buried on December 22 at Inglewood Park Cemetery. The poet laureate position remained empty for several years after his death.
