= Arthur Winston =

- Born: March 22, 1906; Oklahoma Territory
- Died: April 13, 2006 (aged 100); Los Angeles, California, US
- Employer: Los Angeles County Metropolitan Transportation Authority
- Known for: Awarded "Employee of the Century" by President Bill Clinton
- Title: Bus Maintenance Supervisor
- Spouse(s): Frances Smith (1925–1989, her death; 4 children)

Arthur Winston (March 22, 1906 – April 13, 2006) was a Los Angeles Metro employee for 76 years. He is best known for being honored as the "Employee of the Century" by the U.S. Department of Labor for his unparalleled reliability.

== Biography ==
Winston was born and raised in Oklahoma Territory. His first job, at age 10, was picking cotton. In 1918, his family moved to California. Winston graduated from Jefferson High School in 1922 and got a job working for the Los Angeles Railway for four years before quitting because a black man could not drive a bus. He returned to work in January 1934 for the Los Angeles Railway where his income was 41 cents an hour.

In 1925, he married Frances Smith. The couple had four children and five grandchildren, a number of great-grandchildren and a great-great grandson. The Winstons were married for 64 years until her death at age 82 in 1989; the sick day Winston took to attend his wife's funeral was the only instance he missed work in 72 years.

Winston stayed with the agency through its name changes, starting from the Los Angeles Railway which became Los Angeles Transit Lines in 1945, to the Los Angeles Metropolitan Transit Authority created in 1958, the Southern California Rapid Transit District created in 1964, and as it is known today Los Angeles County Metropolitan Transportation Authority "Metro" created in 1993.

In 1996, President Bill Clinton awarded Winston the "Employee of the Century" citation for his work ethic and dedication. He is the most reliable worker that the United States Department of Labor has ever chronicled. He worked for 72 years without arriving late or leaving early and having taken the single sick day. He attributed his work ethic to his upbringing, asserting that his father taught him the value of hard work at an early age.

Upon his retirement on his 100th birthday, he stated that he was planning to visit his 98-year-old brother in Tennessee and had the intention of remaining active in various endeavors. "I'm going to keep active. I can't afford to just sit down. I wouldn't do that," he said. "I don't drink and I don't smoke, so I feel alright."

Winston died of heart failure at his great-granddaughter's home in Los Angeles on April 13, 2006, less than one month after his retirement. He is interred at Inglewood Park Cemetery in Inglewood, California. The Arthur Winston/Mid-Cities bus yard in Leimert Park, Los Angeles is named in his honor.
