= Horace G. Cates =

Cates

Horace Getchell Cates (May 22, 1863 – March 27, 1911) was a surgeon in Los Angeles County, California. He died of blood poisoning a week after scratching his thumb with a pin while preparing a dressing for a patient in Crocker Hospital, of which he was superintendent.

== Life ==
Cates was born in East Vassalboro, Maine on May 22, 1863. He graduated from Colby College and the Minnesota Hospital College. He moved to Santa Monica, California in 1887 and began working as a physician. He began practicing surgery in 1891. He was a surgeon for the Southern Pacific Railroad and for the Pacific Electric Railway Company.

He was a member of the Santa Monica school trustees until he moved from the city in 1891, and he was elected Los Angeles County Coroner for a four-year term on the Republican ticket in November 1892.

Cates was first married to Ella Van Every on May 16, 1889, in Santa Monica, California. She died in Monrovia, California, in May 1891.

He and Mary E. Bicknell were married on June 15, 1895, in Los Angeles. He was survived by her and five children, Charles B., Horace B., Ella, Mildren N. and Mary Edna.

== Death ==
After his death from sepsis, having scratched his hand during his work, The Los Angeles Times said his case was "one of the most serious that ever came to the attention of the surgeons in the Los Angeles hospitals." "The injury was hardly noticeable, but the infection developed with startling suddenness. All of the methods of modern medical science failed to check the spread of the disease," reported the Los Angeles Evening Express, labeling it "blood poisoning." He died without a will, leaving property in Los Angeles, Ventura, and Fresno counties. Interment was in Inglewood Park Cemetery. The New York Insurance Press reported on June 27, 1912, that the largest single insurance claim paid in California during 1911, $95,000, was to the Cates heirs.

== Family ==
His mother, Helena A. Cates, had died on May 26, 1891. He had a brother, Alton M. Cates, who died November 23, 1920.
