= Morton Everel Post =

American politician (1840–1933)

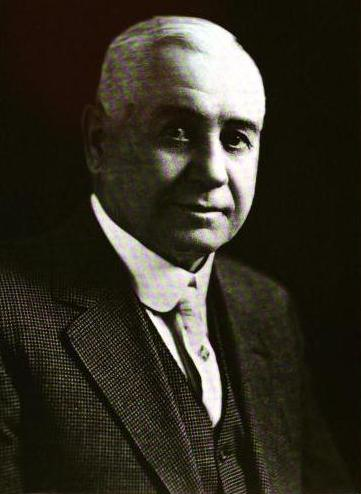

Member of the U.S. House of Representatives from Wyoming Territory's at-large district
- In office March 4, 1881 – March 3, 1885
- Preceded by: Stephen Wheeler Downey
- Succeeded by: Joseph M. Carey

Member of the Wyoming Territorial Senate
- In office 1879–1881

Member of the Laramie County Commission
- In office 1871–1877

Personal details
- Born: December 25, 1840 Henrietta, New York, United States
- Died: March 19, 1933 (aged 92) Alhambra, California, United States
- Resting place: Inglewood Park Cemetery, Inglewood, California
- Party: Democratic
- Spouse: Amalia Barney Simons Nichols
- Parents: Morton A. Post (father); Alary Wickware (mother)

Morton Everel Post (December 25, 1840 – March 19, 1933) was an American businessman, farmer, and politician who served as a delegate to the United States House of Representatives from Wyoming Territory's at-large congressional district.

== Early life ==
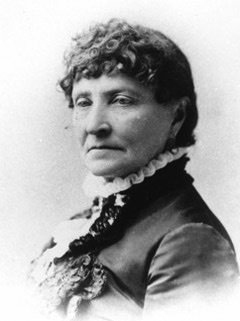
Amalia Barney Simons Nichols

Morton Everel Post was born on December 25, 1840, in Henrietta, New York, to Morton A. Post and Alary Wickware. He attended schools in Medina, New York.

In 1860, he traveled by railroads to the Missouri River and later lead a wagon train from the Missouri River to Denver, Colorado Territory. In 1864, he left Denver and headed to Alder Gulch in the Montana Territory during a gold rush and left with $75,000 in gold. In August, he served as a delegate to the Democratic National Convention. In October, he married Amalia Barney Simons Nichols and remained married until her death on January 28, 1897.

In 1865, he was freighting cargo with twelve other men from Atchison, Kansas to Denver, Colorado Territory when he was attacked by one hundred Native Americans. One man was killed and nine were wounded. In 1866, he moved to North Platte, Nebraska where the Union Pacific Railroad ended and continued working as a freighter.

In 1895, he moved to Rancho Cucamonga, California and started farming. In 1901, he purchased 2,800 acres of land and later sold it in 1910.

== Career ==
=== Business ===
In July 1867, he moved to Cheyenne, Dakota Territory, and built the first mercantile house in Cheyenne after traveling to Denver for wood. In the city he ran a store, the post office, made cattle investments, and purchased banking interests. By 1885, he was a millionaire.

However, the Great Blizzard of 1888 destroyed around $15,000,000 worth of property and heavily affected Post. He later became a real estate agent in Ogden, Utah Territory. In 1890, he traveled to Europe and after returning moved to Salt Lake City where he became investing in mining until 1895.

=== Politics ===
From 1870 to 1876, he served as a member of the Laramie County Commission. From 1878 to 1880, he served as a member of the Wyoming Territorial Senate. From 1881 to 1885, he served as Wyoming's territorial delegate to the United States House of Representatives until he declined another term in 1884.

His wife, Amalia Post, was a suffragist and met with Isabella Beecher Hooker, Victoria Woodhull, and Susan B. Anthony while serving as Wyoming's delegate to the National Woman Suffrage Association in 1871. She asked for Territorial Governor John Allen Campbell to veto legislation that would have repealed women's suffrage in Wyoming, and Campbell returned the legislation unsigned.

== Later life ==
Post retired in 1916, and lived in Los Angeles, California, until he moved to Alhambra, California in 1928. He died on March 19, 1933, in Alhambra and was buried in Inglewood Park Cemetery.

U.S. House of Representatives
Preceded by Stephen Wheeler Downey	Delegate to the U.S. House of Representatives from Wyoming Territory's at-large congressional district March 4, 1881 – March 3, 1885	Succeeded by Joseph M. Carey
