= Leacy Naylor Green-Leach =

American poet

Leacy Naylor Green-Leach (1862–1937) was a poet and editor.

== Early life ==
Green-Leach was born in 1862 in Culpeper County, Virginia. Her parents were James Williams Green and Ann Sanford McDonald. Through her father’s side Green-Leach was descended from George Mason, one of the authors of the Bill of Rights. Green attended private schools in Virginia until enrolling in Hellmuth Ladies' College in London, Ontario. Green-Leach graduated with honors at age 16.

== Later life ==
In 1888 Green-Leach married James Madison Leach Jr. The couple had two children, Marcia Lewis Leach and James Green Leach. Green-Leach was the founder and editor of The Circle, a literary magazine based in Baltimore that operated from 1923 to 1938. 1923 was also the year that Green-Leach founded the American Poetry Circle, a Baltimore literary society. In 1925, Green-Leach joined Gertrude P. West and Edwin Markham in founding Poetic Thrills, a poetry magazine. Green-Leach’s poetry was published in books such as The Independent Poetry Anthology and One Man and a Dream. Green-Leach died on March 12, 1937.
