= Lee Herrick =

Korean-American writer (born 1970)

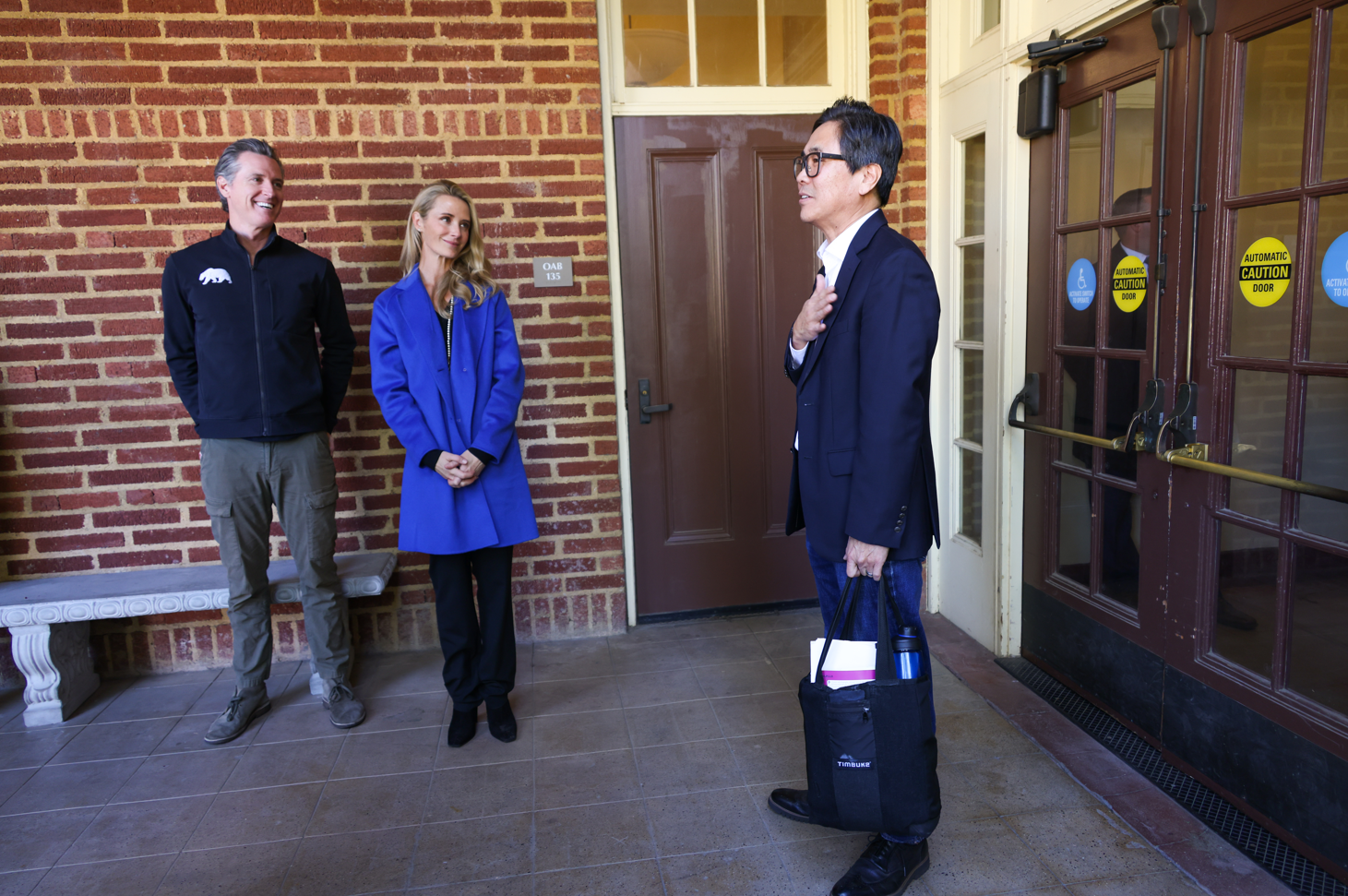
Herrick standing outside of building next to Governor Gavin Newsom and Jennifer Siebel Newsom

Lee Herrick (born 1970) is a Korean American poet, writer and professor, who was appointed to be Poet Laureate of the State of California, the first Asian American to hold the position, by governor Gavin Newsom in 2022.

== Biography ==
Herrick is ethnic Korean and was born in 1970 in Daejeon. He was found on the steps of a church, and was adopted by an American couple in San Francisco at age ten months. Herrick grew up in Danville and Modesto, California, where he became interested in literature. After graduating from high school, he went on to attend Modesto Junior College and CSU Stanislaus. Herrick lives in Fresno, and has taught English at Fresno City College since 1997. He has also taught at the Low-Residency Master of Fine Arts program of study at the University of Nevada, Reno at Lake Tahoe. He served as the Fresno Poet Laureate from 2015 to 2017. In 2015, he co-founded LitHop, an annual literary arts festival in the city.

In 2015, Herrick stated that one of his biggest influences was Andrés Montoya. As the California Poet Laureate, he started the "Our California" initiative which invites Californians to write a poem about their city, town, or about the state and explore what they love, what they would change, or what they hope for it.

== Published works ==
- This Many Miles from Desire. Cincinnati: WordTech Editions. 2007. ISBN 9781933456614. OCLC 181372610.
- Gardening Secrets of the Dead. Cincinnati: WordTech Editions. 2012. ISBN 9781936370979. OCLC 824983456.
- Scar and Flower. Cincinnati: Word Poetry. 2018. ISBN 9781625492944. OCLC 1082154187.
- In Praise of Late Wonder: New and Selected Poems. Santa Barbara: Gunpowder Press. 2024. ISBN 9781957062174. OCLC 1459752818.

As coeditor:

- The World I Leave You: Asian American Poets on Faith and Spirit. Asheville, NC: Orison Books. 2020. ISBN 9781949039054. OCLC 1142884166.
