= Inglewood Park Cemetery =

Cemetery in Inglewood, California

Coordinates: 33°58′03″N 118°20′20″W

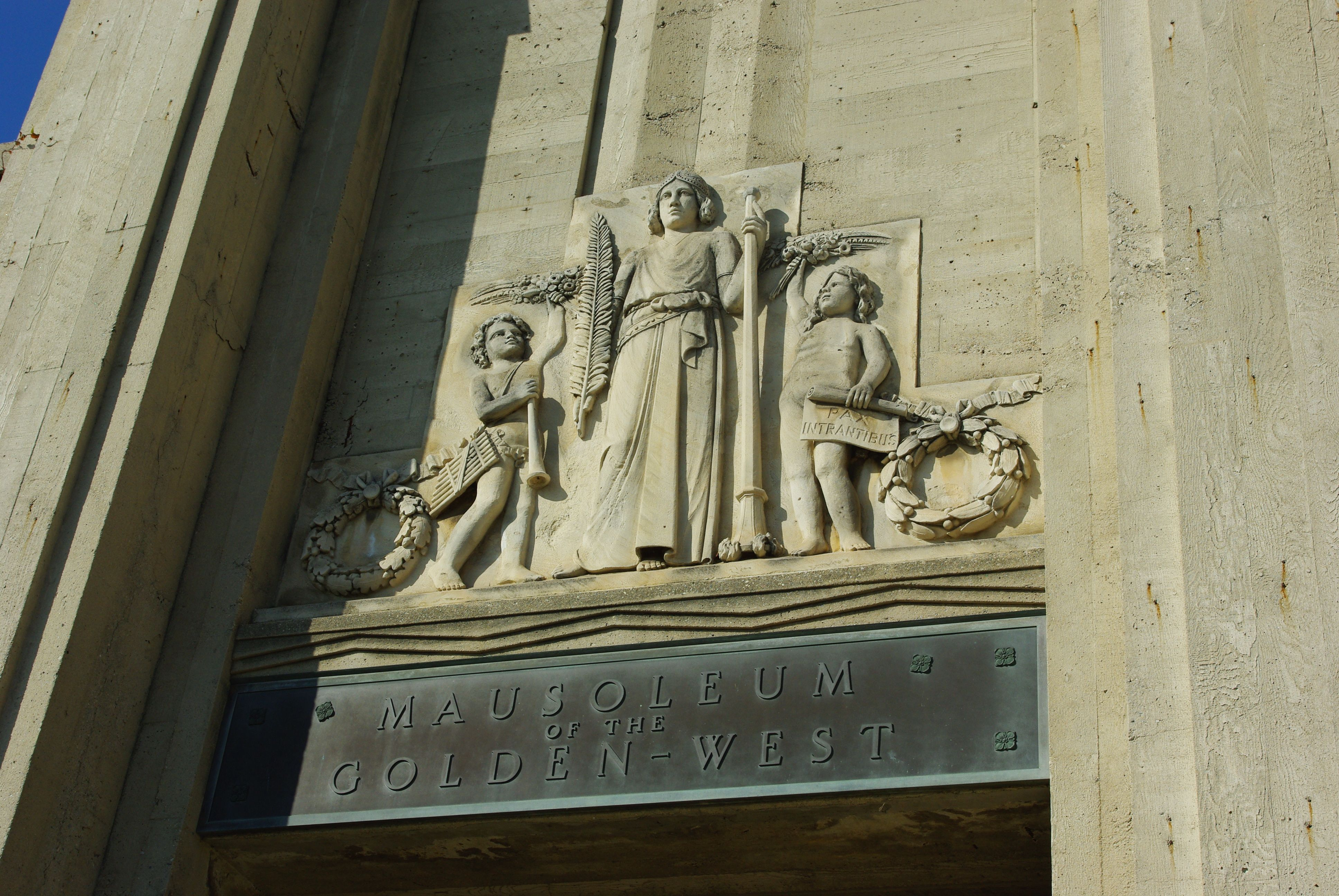
- Interactive map of Inglewood Park Cemetery

Details
- Established: 1905
- Location: 720 East Florence Avenue; Inglewood, California
- Country: United States
- Type: Non-profit
- Size: 200 acres (0.81 km^{2})
- Website: https://www.inglewoodparkcemetery.com/

Inglewood Park Cemetery, is a cemetery in Inglewood, California, United States, that was founded in 1905. A number of notable people, including entertainment and sports personalities, have been interred or entombed there.

== History ==
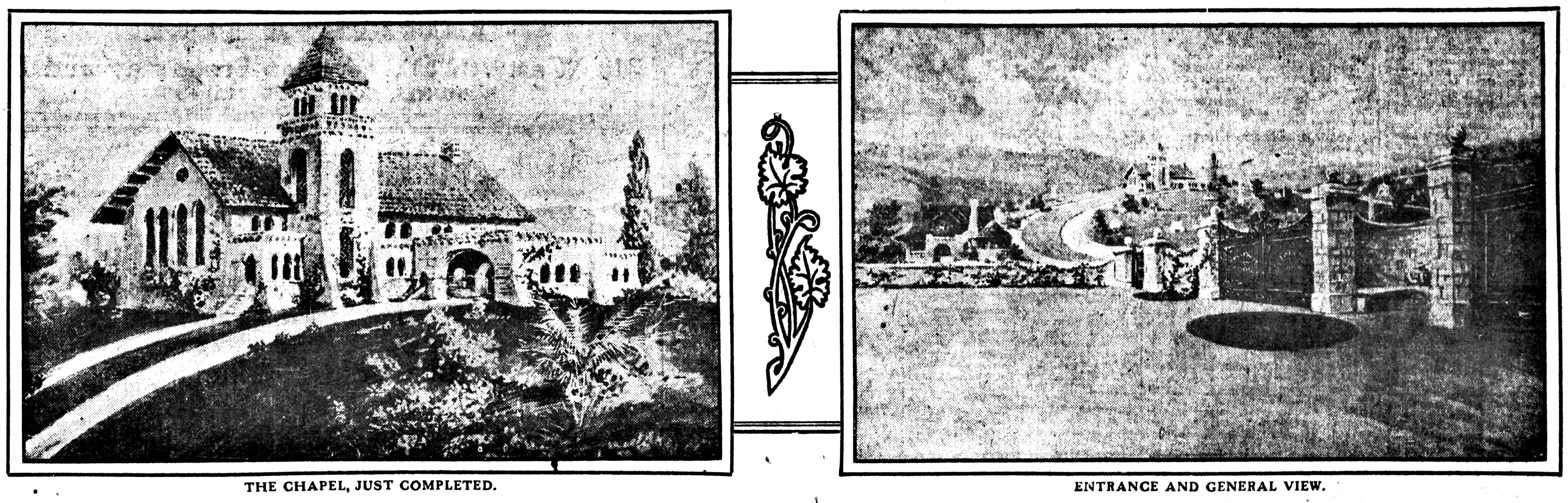
Left, the chapel; right, entrance and general view, from a newspaper advertisement, 1907

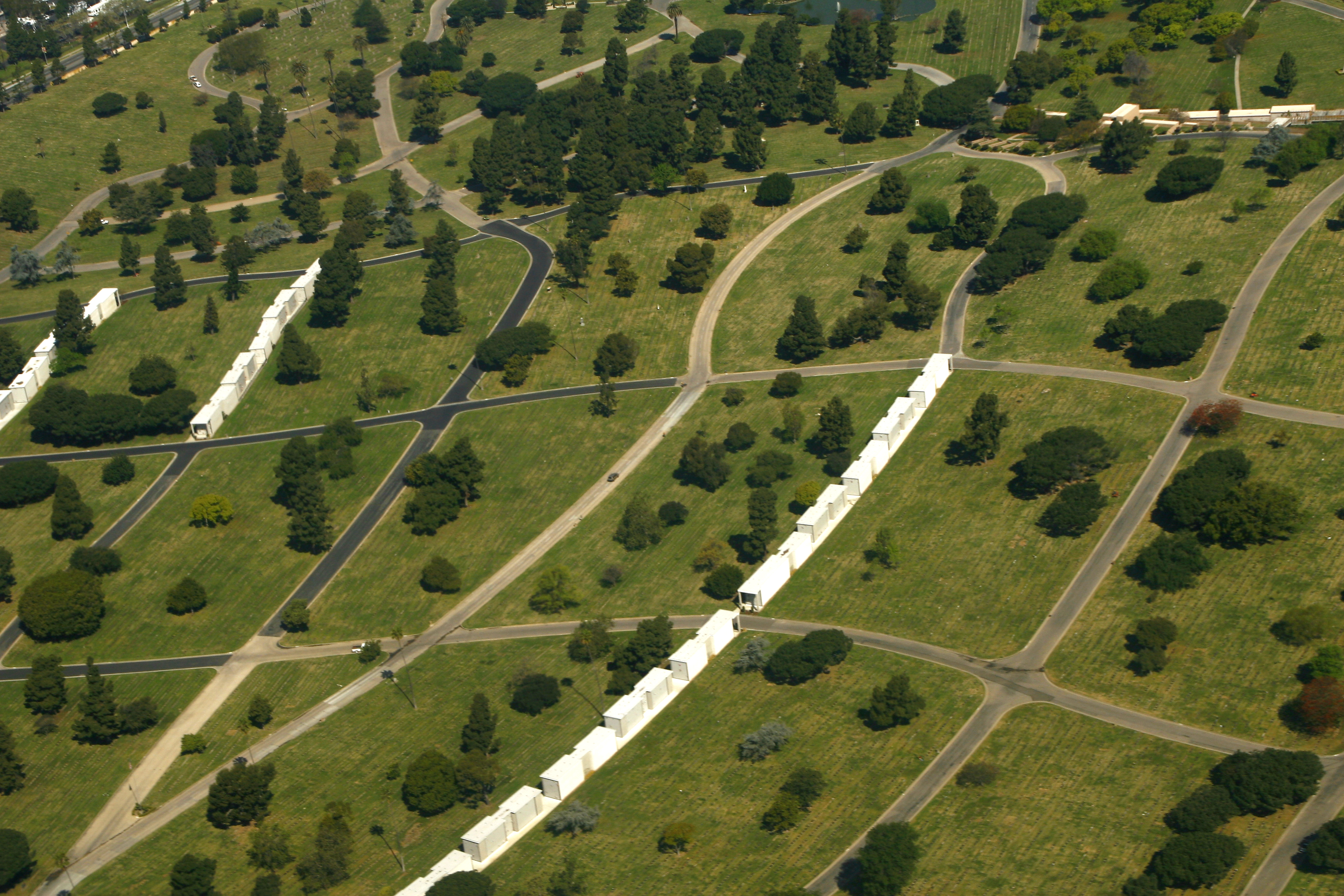
Aerial view, 2008

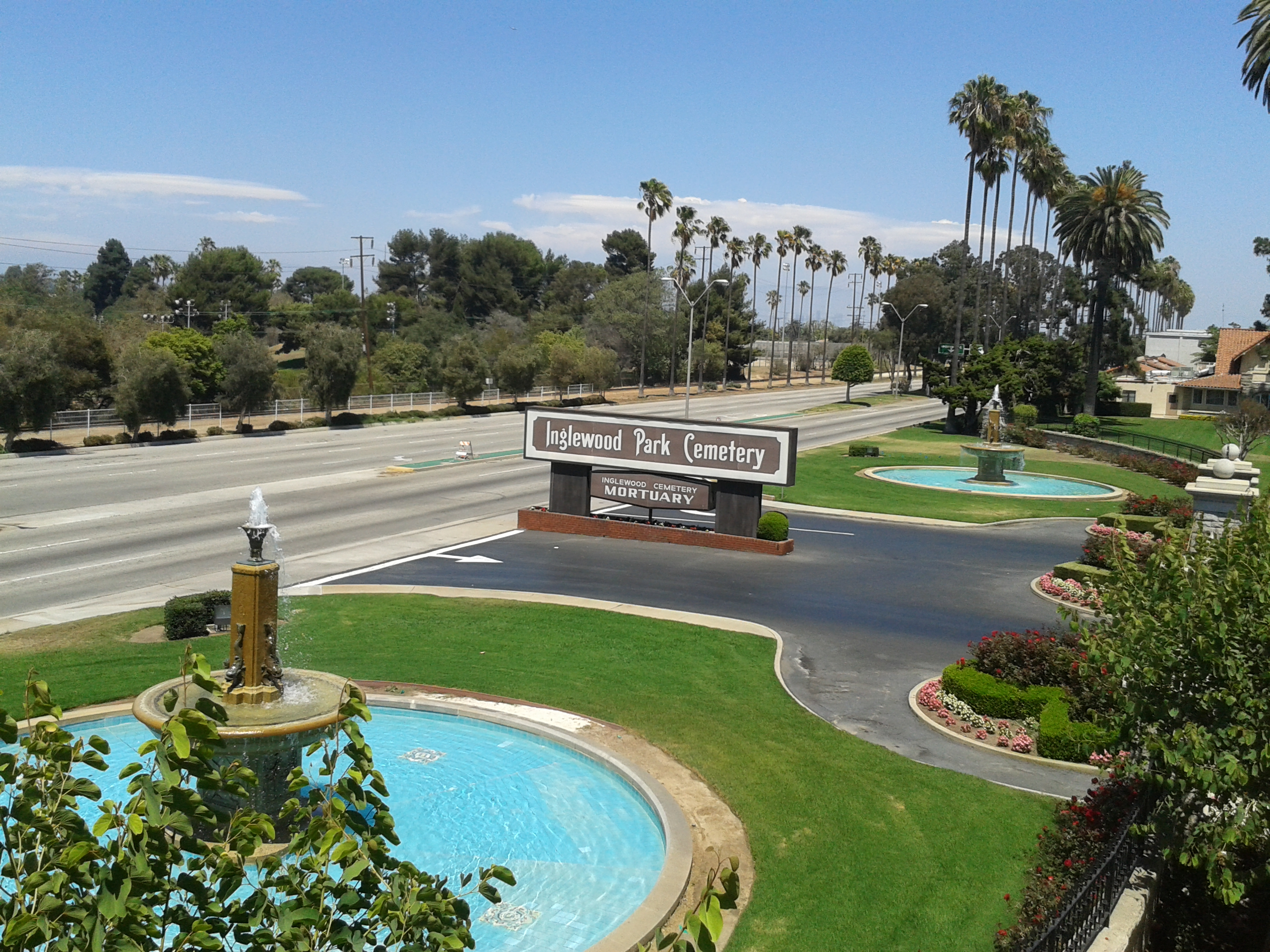
Florence Avenue entrance, 2013

The proposed establishment of "the largest cemetery in the world" was announced in November 1905, to be "on a high strip of ground two miles southwest of Los Angeles".

In 1907, a "handsome, two-story, white granite chapel" was completed at a cost of "about $40,000".

Also in 1907 the management placed an order "with the factory in the East" for a $12,000 funeral car to be used "on the electric line" that ran on a right-of-way off Redondo Boulevard (today's Florence Avenue) in front of the cemetery.

Between 1928 and 1948 Inglewood Park advertised itself as the "Largest in California," with a mausoleum, cemetery, and columbarium. From 1948 through 1950 it said it had the "Greatest number of interments in the West".

=== Organizers and directors ===
Early backers of the Inglewood Cemetery Association were Senator Robert N. Bulla, Mark G. Jones, Robert H. Raphael, Tom Hughes, P.W. Powers, Byron Oliver, B.J. or V.J. Rowan, F.K. Eckley, C.B. Hopper, Harry M. Jack, John R. Powers, George Letteau, Jennie Wild, and Will G. Nevin. Others were P.W. Powers and D.S. Patterson.

In 1907 the directors were Mark G. Jones, F.K. Eckley, Robt. N. Bulls, John C. Rupp, Robt. H. Raphael, Geo. H. Letteau, and Chas. B. Hopper. The officers were Mark G. Jones, president and treasurer; Chas. B. Hopper, vice-president; F.K. Eckley, secretary; V.J. Rowan, engineer, and Captain L.G. Loomis, superintendent.

== Notable burials ==
One of the earliest notable burials was that of Webster Street, justice of the Supreme Court of Arizona between 1897 and 1900, on September 23, 1908.

Another was the September 12, 1908, funeral of Los Angeles city Police Chief Walter H. Auble, who was shot and killed in the line of duty. Thousands came from Los Angeles on carriages and aboard special Los Angeles Railway streetcars.

=== List ===
(Note: This is a partial list. See also Category:Burials at Inglewood Park Cemetery.)

=== A ===
- Margaret Queen Adams (1874–1974), first female deputy sheriff in the United States
- Jewel Akens (1933–2013), singer
- Coit Albertson (1880–1953), actor
- Curtis Amy (1929–2002), musician
- Joseph H. August (1890–1947), cinematographer
- Lloyd Avery II (1969–2005), actor

=== B ===
- Cal Bailey (1909–1988), caricaturist, artist
- Chet Baker (1929–1988), musician
- W. Lester Banks (1911–1986), American civil rights leader
- Reginald Barker (1886–1945), director
- Earl Battey (1935–2003), baseball player
- Beals Becker (1886–1943), baseball player
- Ricky Bell (1955–1984), NFL running back
- George Bennard (1873–1958), composer
- Edgar Bergen (1903–1978), actor and ventriloquist
- Wally Berger (1905–1988), baseball player
- Paul Bern (1885–1932), director, screenwriter and producer
- Richard Berry (1935–1997), singer and songwriter
- Lillian Biron (1898–1957), actress
- Elmer Booth (1882–1915), actor
- Margaret Booth (1898–2002), film editor
- Lyman Bostock (1950–1978), baseball player
- Fletcher Bowron (1887–1968), Los Angeles mayor and judge
- Tom Bradley (1917–1998), Los Angeles mayor
- Byron B. Brainard (1894–1940), Los Angeles City Council member
- Layne Britton (1907–1993), makeup artist
- Gladys Brockwell (1894–1929), actress
- Charles Brown (1922–1999), singer
- Chris Brown (1961–2006), baseball player
- Nacio Herb Brown (1896–1964), composer
- Robert L. Burns (1876–1955), Los Angeles City Council member, 1929–45
- Jheryl Busby (1949–2008), former CEO of Motown Records

=== C ===
Horace G. Cates

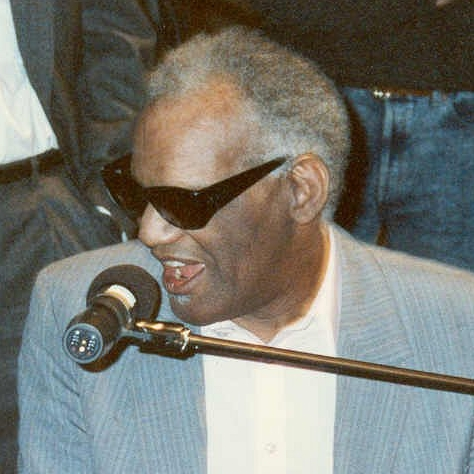
Ray Charles

- Harry Caesar (1928–1994) singer, actor
- Bebe Moore Campbell (1951–2006), author
- Caesar Cardini (1896–1956), credited as creator of Caesar Salad
- Horace G. Cates (1864–1911), Los Angeles County coroner
- Ray Charles (1930–2004), musician
- Thornton Chase (1847–1912), first western Baha'i, Annual memorial in September draws large crowds.
- James Cleveland (1931–1991), gospel singer, composer, arranger
- Johnnie Cochran (1937–2005), trial lawyer
- Anthony Cornero (1899–1955), bootlegger, gambling entrepreneur
- Ray "Crash" Corrigan (1902–1976), actor
- Willie Covan (1897–1989), dancer, actor
- Al Cowens (1951–2002), baseball player
- Pee Wee Crayton (1914–1985), guitarist, blues singer
- Sam Crawford (1880–1968), baseball player

=== D ===
- Julian Dixon (1934–2000), U.S. Congressman
- Badja Djola (1948–2005), actor
- Robert DoQui (1934–2008), actor
- Solly Drake (1930–2021), baseball player
- William Duncan (1879–1961), actor

=== E ===
- Dock Ellis (1945–2008), baseball player
- Zari Elmassian Vartian (1906–1990), singer
- Victor Hugo Emerson (1866-1926), president of the Emerson Phonograph Company

=== F ===
- Louise Fazenda (1895–1962), actress
- Auntie Fee (1957–2017), YouTube star and chef
- Ella Fitzgerald (1917–1996), singer
- Curt Flood (1938–1997), baseball player
- Clara Shortridge Foltz (1849–1934), first female lawyer on the West Coast.
- Byron Foulger (1899–1970), actor
- Wardell Fouse (1960–2003), the person responsible as the shooter in the murder of the Notorious B.I.G
- Lowell Fulson (1921–1999), blues musician

=== G ===
- Hoot Gibson (1892–1962), actor
- Jim Gilliam (1928–1978), baseball player
- Betty Grable (1916–1973), actress, singer and dancer
- Mudcat Grant (1935–2021), baseball player
- Leroy Milton Grider (1854–1919), Los Angeles real estate man
- Ferde Grofé (1892–1973), composer
- Robert Guillaume (1927–2017), actor and singer

=== H ===
- Kenneth Hahn (1920–1997), county supervisor and city council member
- Jester Hairston (1901–2000), actor, musician, arranger
- Lois Hall (1926–2006), actress
- Robin Harris (1953–1990), actor and comedian
- Ted Hawkins (1936–1995), soul blues singer and songwriter
- Monk Higgins (1930–1986), saxophonist, arranger and producer
- Ronnie Hillman (1991–2022), NFL running back
- Helen Humes (1913–1981), singer
- Flo Hyman (1954–1986), volleyball player

=== J ===
- Etta James (1938–2012), singer
- Bud Jamison (1894–1944), actor
- James J. Jeffries (1875–1953), world heavyweight boxing champion
- Lou Johnson (1932–2020), baseball player

=== K ===
- Robert Kardashian (1944–2003), attorney, businessman
- Kirk Kerkorian (1917–2015), businessman
- Brady Keys (1936–2017), football player
- Cecil R. King (1898–1974), U.S. Congressman
- Richard Douglas King (1879–1945), architect
- Jerry Knight (1952–1996), musician
- Fred Kohler (1888–1938), actor

=== L ===
- Art Laboe (1925-2022), radio personality
- Allan "Rocky" Lane (1909–1973), actor
- Walter Lang (1896–1972), film director
- Lucille La Verne (1872–1945), actress
- Gypsy Rose Lee (1911–1970), actress and burlesque dancer
- Lillian Leitzel (1892–1931), acrobat
- Evan Lewis (1869–1941), Los Angeles City Council member
- Walter Lindley (1852–1922), Los Angeles physician and educational leader

=== M ===
- D'Urville Martin (1939–1984), actor, producer and director
- Edith Wynne Matthison (1875–1955), actress
- Lee Maye (1934–2002), baseball player
- Fred McMullin (1891–1952), baseball player
- Irish Meusel (1893–1963), baseball player
- Louis Meyer (1904–1995), race car driver
- Cleo Moore (1928–1973), actress
- Juanita Moore (1914–2014), actress
- Darius Morris (1991–2024), basketball player
- Ernest "Sunshine Sammy" Morrison (1912–1989), actor
- Herbert Mundin (1898–1939), actor
- Don Myrick (1940–1993), musician

=== N ===
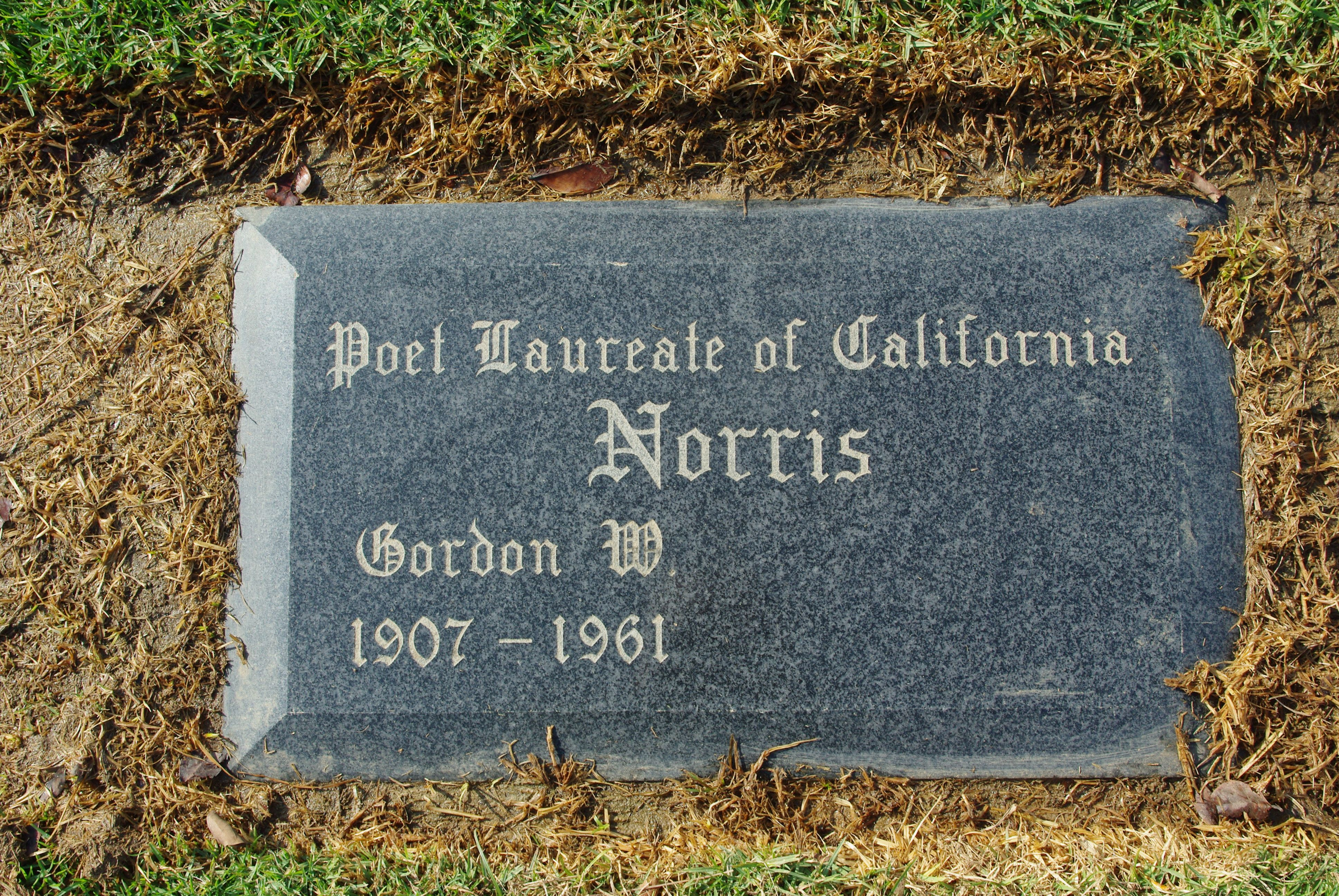
Grave marker for Gordon W. Norris

- Gordon W. Norris (1907–1961), poet laureate of California

=== O ===
- Fred Offenhauser (1888–1973), automotive inventor
- Orval Overall (1881–1947), Major League Baseball pitcher
- O.Y.G. Redrum 781 (1972–2021), rapper

=== P ===
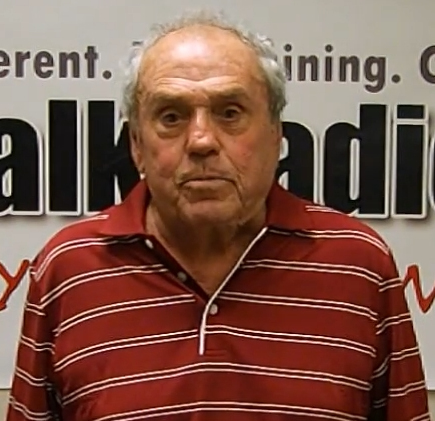
Michael Preece

- Judy Pace (1942-2026), actress
- LaWanda Page (1920–2002), actress and comedian
- George H. Peck (1856–1940), real estate broker & developer
- Lawrence Phillips (1975–2016), NFL running back
- Morton E. Post (1840–1933), businessman and politician
- Michael Preece (1936-2025), film and television director, script supervisor, producer, and actor
- Billy Preston (1946–2006), singer and songwriter
- George W. Prince (1854–1939), U.S. Congressman
- Brad Pye Jr. (1931–2020), sports journalist and broadcaster

=== R ===
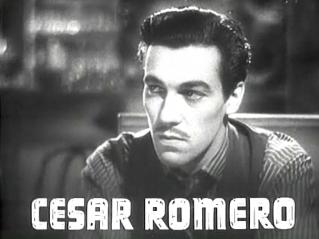
Cesar Romero

- Robert Riskin (1897–1955), screenwriter
- Sugar Ray Robinson (1921–1989), World Champion boxer
- LaTasha "MC Trouble" Rogers (1970–1991), rapper
- Cesar Romero (1907–1994), actor
- David Rosen (1930-2025), businessman

=== S ===
- Evelyn Selbie (1871–1950), actress
- Blanche Sewell (1898–1949), editor
- Frank L. Shaw (1877–1958), Los Angeles mayor
- Orfa Jean Shontz (1876–1954), the first woman in California to "sit on the bench and administer justice"
- Charles A. Siringo (1855–1928), author
- Vivian Smallwood (1933-2017), rapper and actress
- Myrtle Stedman (1883–1938), actress
- Slim Summerville (1892–1946), actor
- Big Syke (1968–2016), rapper
- Sylvester (1947–1988), singer

=== T ===
- Richard Talmadge (1892–1981), actor and film director
- David Torrence (1864–1951), Scottish-born actor
- Billie "Buckwheat" Thomas (1931–1980), actor
- Big Mama Thornton (1926–1984), singer and songwriter

=== V ===
- Joseph W. Vance (1841–1927), military officer
- Ernest O. Voigt (1888–1962), State Assemblyman

=== W ===
- T-Bone Walker (1910–1975), musician
- Bobby Wallace (1873–1960), baseball Hall of Famer
- Lalomie Washburn (1941–2004), singer songwriter
- George Dexter Whitcomb (1834–1914), American industrialist, entrepreneur, and founder of Glendora, California
- Laura L. Whitlock (1862–1934), mapmaker
- Larry Williams (1935–1980), singer and actor
- Paul Williams (1894–1980), architect
- Murry Wilson (1917–1973), musician, record producer, businessman, and father of Brian, Dennis, and Carl Wilson of the Beach Boys
- Parke Wilson (1867–1934), baseball player
- Arthur Winston (1906–2006), centenarian
- John Downey Works (1847–1928), U.S. Senator
- Syreeta Wright (1946–2004), singer

=== Y ===
- Carleton G. Young (1907–1971), actor

== See also ==
- List of United States cemeteries
- Centinela Park, located across the street
