= Zari Elmassian =

American singer (1906–1990)

- Zaruhi Elmassian, from a 1933 publication.
- Born: Zaruhi Elmassian; October 12, 1906; Lynn, Massachusetts
- Died: February 6, 1990 (aged 83); Los Angeles, California
- Other name: Zaruhi Elmassian Vartian (after marriage)
- Occupation: Singer

Zaruhi Elmassian (October 12, 1906 – February 6, 1990), known professionally as Zari Elmassian and later as Zaruhi Elmassian Vartian, was an American singer, best known for her voice work on Hollywood musicals in the 1930s, including The Wizard of Oz.

== Early life ==
Zaruhi Elmassian was born in Lynn, Massachusetts, the daughter of John Elmassian and Satenig Aloojian Elmassian. Her parents were both born in Armenia. The family had moved to Fresno, California, by the time her younger sister Alice was born. She attended Fresno State College, the University of Southern California music school, the Eastman School of Music, and the New England Conservatory of Music.

== Career ==
Elmassian sang on a radio program in 1929, and with the San Francisco Opera from 1930 to 1932, in productions of Hänsel und Gretel, Manon, Tannhäuser, and Carmen. She later sang with the Los Angeles Opera, and was a busy concert singer and church soloist in California, through the 1930s and 1940s.

Elmassian provided vocal performances for Hollywood musicals, usually uncredited, including It's Great to Be Alive (1933), Naughty Marietta (1935), Orchids to You (1935), Here's to Romance (1935), The Great Ziegfeld (1936), Charlie Chan at the Opera (1936), Maytime (1937), Sweethearts (1938), The Girl of the Golden West (1938), The Wizard of Oz (1939), and Broadway Serenade (1939). She was also the musical director at St. James Armenian Apostolic Church in Los Angeles, and a member of the Dominant Music Club, a women's club for professional musicians.

With her husband, she starred in an Armenian-language musical melodrama, Anoush (1945), based on the work of Hovhannes Toumanyan, and the opera Anoush by Armen Dickranian. They also released a record called Armenian Songs, and she can be heard on another album, Oscar Levant Plays Levant & Gershwin.

In 1933, she was in headlines when she was questioned about the murder of dentist Leon Siever, apparently a fan of Elmassian's work at the Los Angeles Opera. Siever was founder and director of the Artists' Endowment, which gave Elmassian a scholarship in 1930.

== Personal life ==
Elmassian married film editor Setrag Vartian in 1942, in Las Vegas, Nevada. She was widowed when Vartian died in 1986, and she died in 1990, in Los Angeles, aged 83 years. The Vartians' joint gravesite is in Inglewood Park Cemetery.
