= The Man with the Hoe =

1898 Edwin Markham poem

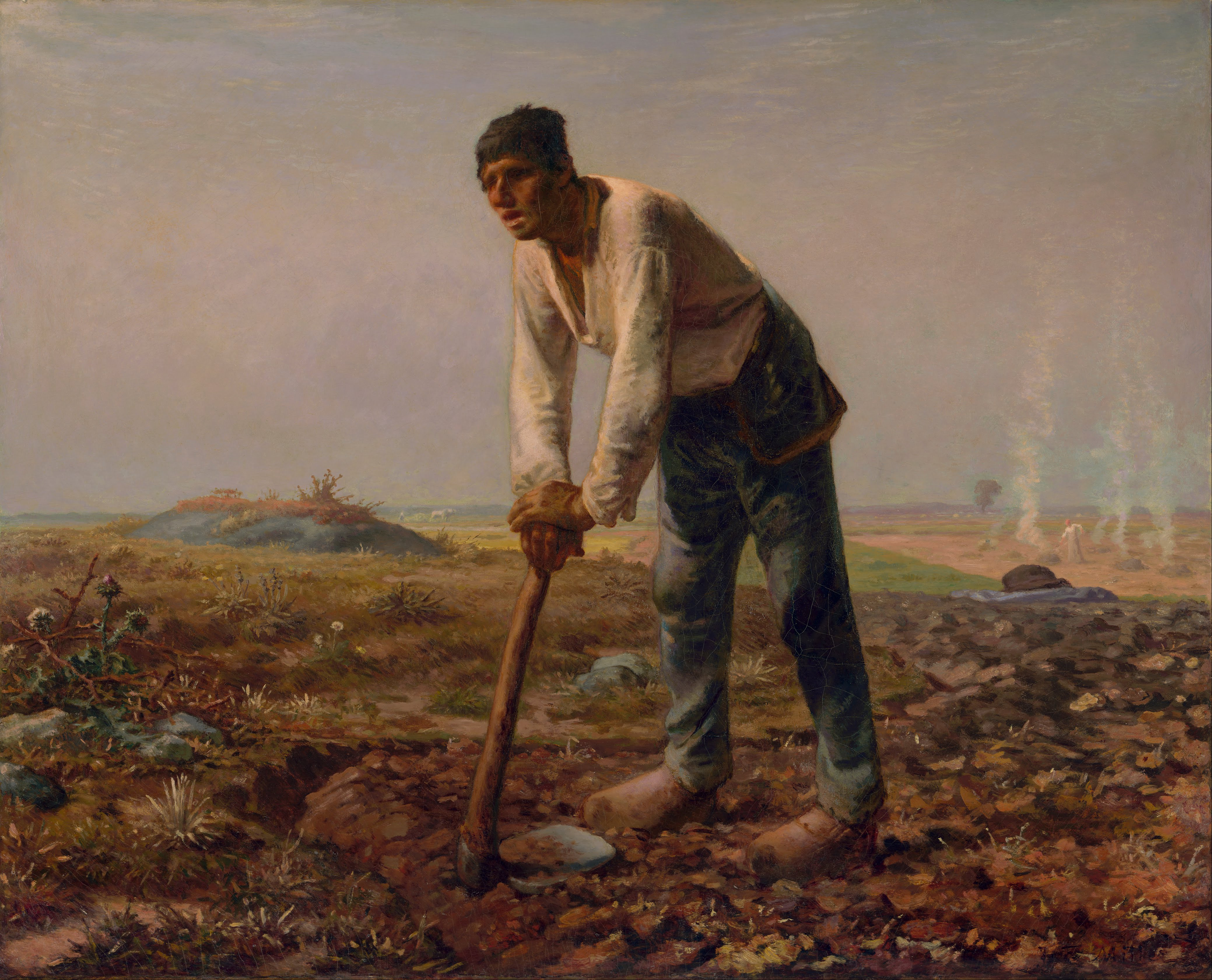
"Bowed by the weight of centuries he leans Upon his hoe and gazes on the ground, The emptiness of ages in his face, And on his back the burden of the world."

"The Man with the Hoe" is an 1898 poem by the American poet Edwin Markham, inspired by Jean-François Millet's 1860-1862 painting L'homme à la houe, a painting interpreted as a socialist protest about the peasant's plight.

== Summary ==
The poem was first presented as a public poetry reading at a New Year's Eve party in 1898. It was soon published in the San Francisco Examiner in January 1899 after its editor heard it at the same party. The poem was also reprinted in other newspapers across the United States due to a chorus of acclaim. It was used as the opening poem in Markham's 1902 collection The Man with a Hoe and Other Poems.

The poem portrays the labor of much of humanity using the symbolism of a laborer leaning upon his hoe, burdened by his work, but receiving little rest or reward.

== Poem text ==
The Man with the Hoe
Bowed by the weight of centuries he leans
Upon his hoe and gazes on the ground,
The emptiness of ages in his face,
And on his back the burden of the world.
Who made him dead to rapture and despair,
A thing that grieves not and that never hopes.
Stolid and stunned, a brother to the ox?
Who loosened and let down this brutal jaw?
Whose was the hand that slanted back this brow?
Whose breath blew out the light within this brain?

Is this the Thing the Lord God made and gave
To have dominion over sea and land;
To trace the stars and search the heavens for power;
To feel the passion of Eternity?
Is this the Dream He dreamed who shaped the suns
And marked their ways upon the ancient deep?
Down all the stretch of Hell to its last gulf
There is no shape more terrible than this —
More tongued with censure of the world's blind greed —
More filled with signs and portents for the soul —
More fraught with menace to the universe.

What gulfs between him and the seraphim!
Slave of the wheel of labor, what to him
Are Plato and the swing of Pleiades?
What the long reaches of the peaks of song,
The rift of dawn, the reddening of the rose?
Through this dread shape the suffering ages look;
Time's tragedy is in the aching stoop;
Through this dread shape humanity betrayed,
Plundered, profaned, and disinherited,
Cries protest to the Powers that made the world.
A protest that is also a prophecy.

O masters, lords and rulers in all lands,
Is this the handiwork you give to God,
This monstrous thing distorted and soul-quenched?
How will you ever straighten up this shape;
Touch it again with immortality;
Give back the upward looking and the light;
Rebuild in it the music and the dream,
Make right the immemorial infamies,
Perfidious wrongs, immedicable woes?

O masters, lords and rulers in all lands
How will the Future reckon with this Man?
How answer his brute question in that hour
When whirlwinds of rebellion shake all shores?
How will it be with kingdoms and with kings —
With those who shaped him to the thing he is —
When this dumb Terror shall rise to judge the world.
After the silence of the centuries?

== Impact ==
"The Man with a Hoe" was called by philosopher, novelist and peace activist Jay William Hudson "the battle-cry of the next thousand years". It has been translated into 37 languages, earning Markham about $250,000 over 33 years. After its publication, the poem's content, form, and language have captured the feelings and thoughts of people, drawing attention to social issues such as labor exploitation while helping causes such as the revitalization of efforts pursuing labor reform. The poem also helped Markham's career. The poet became a much sought-after public speaker and his first book of poetry was immediately published to take advantage of the opportunities that became available after the poem established him as one of the American modern poets.
