= Henry Meade Bland =

American educator and poet

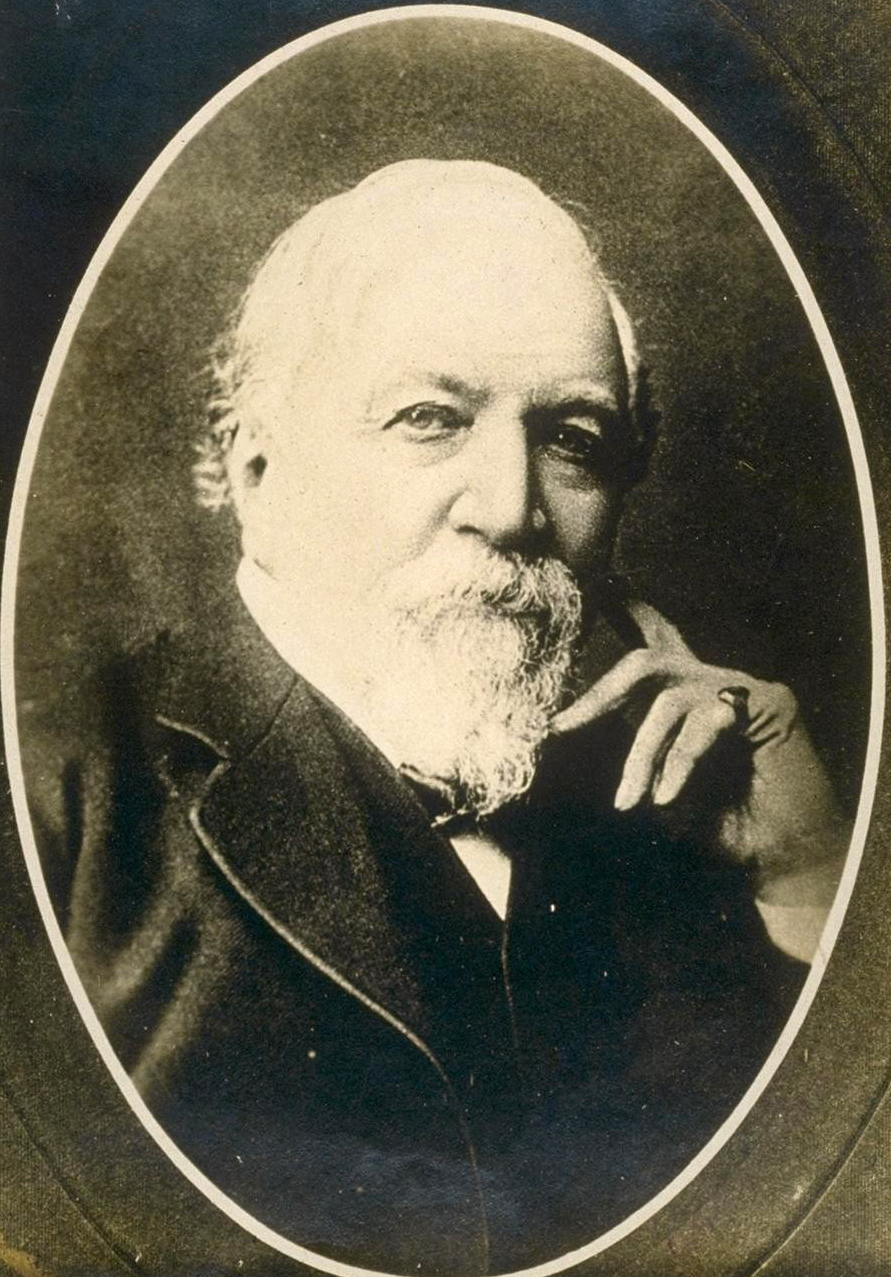
- Born: April 21, 1863; Fairfield, California, U.S.
- Died: April 29, 1931 (aged 68)
- Education: University of the Pacific (B.A., M.A.); Stanford University (Ph.D)

California Poet Laureate
- In office March 22, 1929 – April 30, 1931
- Preceded by: Ina Coolbrith
- Succeeded by: John S. McGroarty

Henry Meade Bland (April 21, 1863 – April 29, 1931) was an American educator and poet who became California Poet Laureate in 1929 after succeeding California's first Poet Laureate, Ina Coolbrith.

== Early life and education ==
Bland was born on April 21, 1863, in Fairfield, California. He had an undergraduate degree in ???, Master in Philosophy in 1889, and a PhD in 1890 from University of the Pacific, and, a masters from Stanford University in 1895. He worked as a teacher and school administrator for 15 years at schools in Los Gatos, Santa Clara, and San Jose, before joining the San Jose Normal School in 1899 to teach English. He remained at California State Normal School until his death.

== Career ==
During the early years of the twentieth century, Bland penned reviews of the works of California writers for Town and Country. He was the friend of Joaquin Miller, Jack London, John Muir, Edwin Markham, and other California literary figures. His verse was published in Sierran Pan & Other Poems (1924) and six other volumes. His prose writings include Stevenson's California (1924) and Prose & Poetry for Children (1914).

On March 22, 1929, a joint resolution was passed in the California State Legislature to name Bland the California Poet Laureate. The title given was The Laurel Crowned Poet of California (Statutes of 1929, Resolution Chapter 23). California began the practice of naming a poet laureate in 1915.

== Death ==
Bland died on April 29, 1931, two years into his life-term appointment as California's Poet Laureate.
