= Amalia Post =

American suffragist (1836–1897)

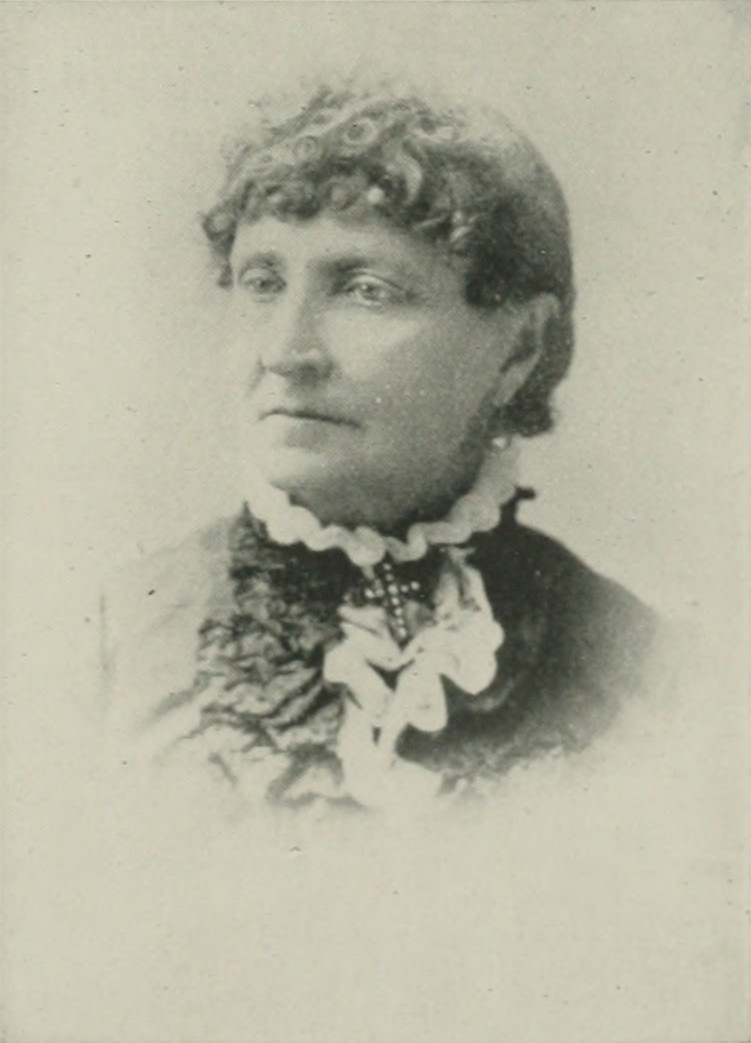
Amalia Post, "A Woman of the Century"

Amalia Post (January 30, 1826 – January 28, 1897) was an American suffragist. She had been a leader in the woman suffrage movement for 25 years and was largely instrumental in having the franchise granted women in Wyoming Territory by the 1st Wyoming Territorial Legislature in 1869.

== Biography ==
Amalia Barney Simons was born in Johnson, Vermont, January 30, 1826. Her ancestors were prominent in early American history, one of them, Thomas Chittenden, being the first Governor of Vermont, and several were officers in the Revolutionary War and in the American army and navy in the War of 1812. Her parents were William Simons and Amalia Barney, of Johnson.

In 1855, in Lexington, Michigan, she married Walker T. Nichols. But the marriage did not last. After he deserted her twice, the second time with another woman, she divorced him.

In 1864, in Chicago, 1864, she married Morton Everel Post, and with her husband crossed the Great Plains in 1866, settling in Denver, Colorado, and moving to Cheyenne, Wyoming, in 1867, where they lived subsequently.

Her life in Wyoming was closely identified with the story of obtaining and maintaining equal political rights for Wyoming women, and to her, perhaps more than to any other individual, is due the fact that the women of Wyoming received the right of suffrage. In 1869, the first legislature of Wyoming Territory granted to women the right to vote. The movement was an experimental one, and few expected that the women of the Territory would avail themselves of the privileges granted by the law. That the movement was a success and became a permanent feature of Wyoming's political history was due to the wise use of its privileges by the educated and cultured women of the Territory. Without lessening the respect in which they were held, Post and other prominent women quietly assumed their political privileges and duties.

Post was for four years a member of the Territorial Central Committee of the Republican party. Several times, she served on juries, and she was foreman of a jury composed of six men and six women, before which the first legal conviction for murder was passed in the Territory. In 1871, she was a delegate to the Woman's National Convention in Washington, D.C., and before an audience of 5,000 people in Lincoln Hall, she told of woman's emancipation in Wyoming.

In the fall of 1871, the Wyoming Legislature repealed the act granting suffrage to women. Post, by a personal appeal to Governor John Allen Campbell, induced him to veto the bill. To Post he said:— "I came here opposed to woman suffrage, but the eagerness and fidelity with which you and your friends have performed political duties, when called upon to act, has convinced me that you deserve to enjoy those rights." A determined effort was made to pass the bill over the governor's veto. A canvass of the members had shown that the necessary two-thirds majority would probably be secured, though by the narrow margin of one vote. With political sagacity equal to that of any man, Post decided to secure that one vote. By an earnest appeal to one of the best educated members, she won him to its support, and, upon the final ballot being taken upon the proposal to pass the bill over the governor's veto, that man, Senator Foster, voted "No," and woman suffrage became a permanency in Wyoming.

From 1880 until 1884, Post, whose husband was delegate to Congress from Wyoming during that time, resided in Washington, D.C. By her social tact and sterling qualities, she made many friends for the cause of woman suffrage among those who were inclined to believe that only the forward or immodest of the sex desired suffrage. From 1873, she served as vice-president of the National Woman Suffrage Association.

In 1890, after equal rights to Wyoming women had been secured irrevocably by the constitution adopted by the people of the new State, Post was made president of the committees having in charge the statehood celebration. On that occasion, a copy of the State constitution was presented to the women of the State by Judge Melville C. Brown, who had been president of the constitutional convention which adopted it. Post received the book on behalf of the women of the State.

She died in Cheyenne, January 28, 1897.
