= Edwin Markham =

American poet

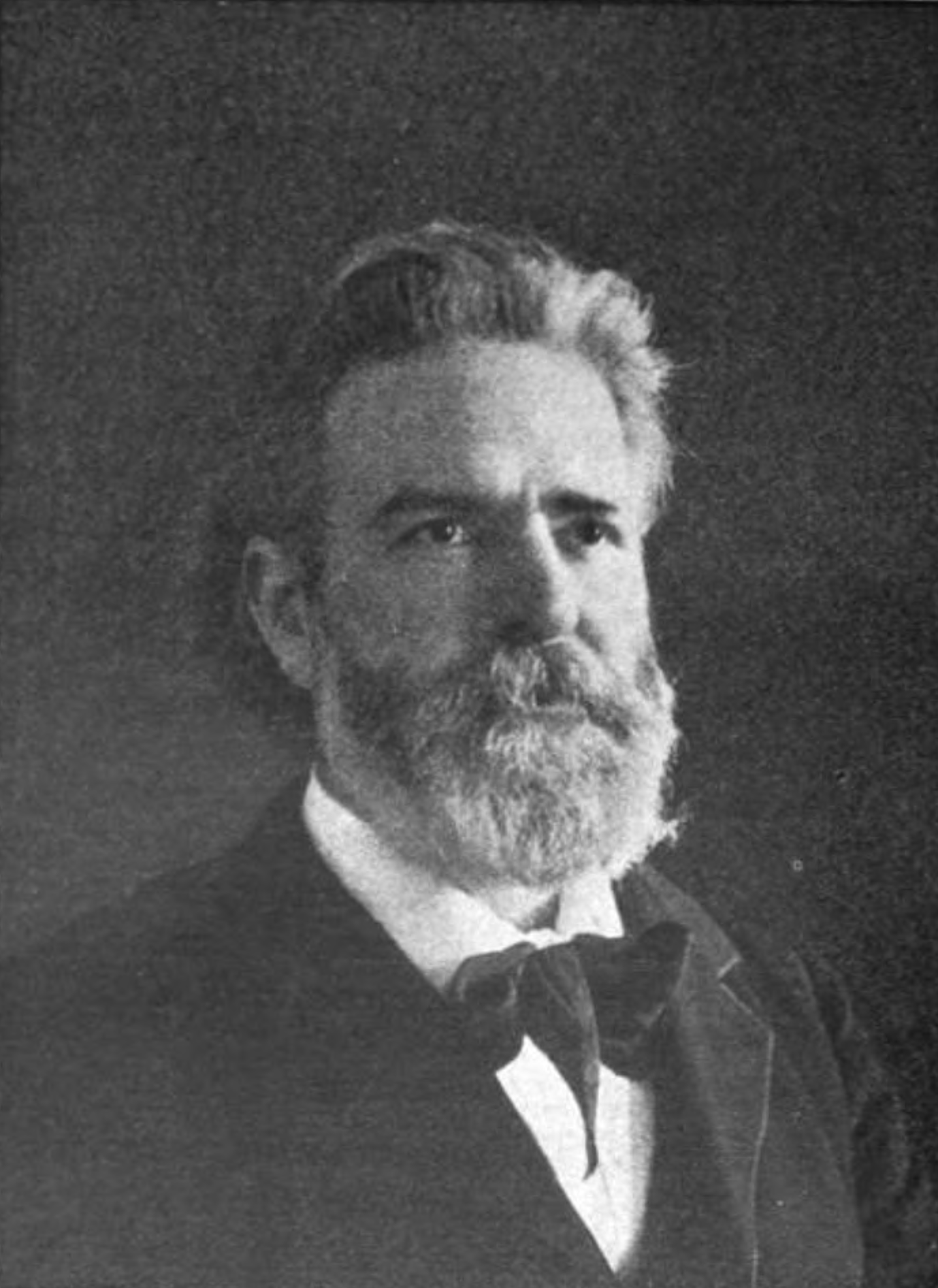
- Born: April 23, 1852; Oregon City, Oregon, U.S.
- Died: March 7, 1940 (aged 87); Staten Island, New York, U.S.
- Education: California State Normal School
- Occupation: Poet
- Writing career
- Notable work: "The Man with the Hoe"

Signature
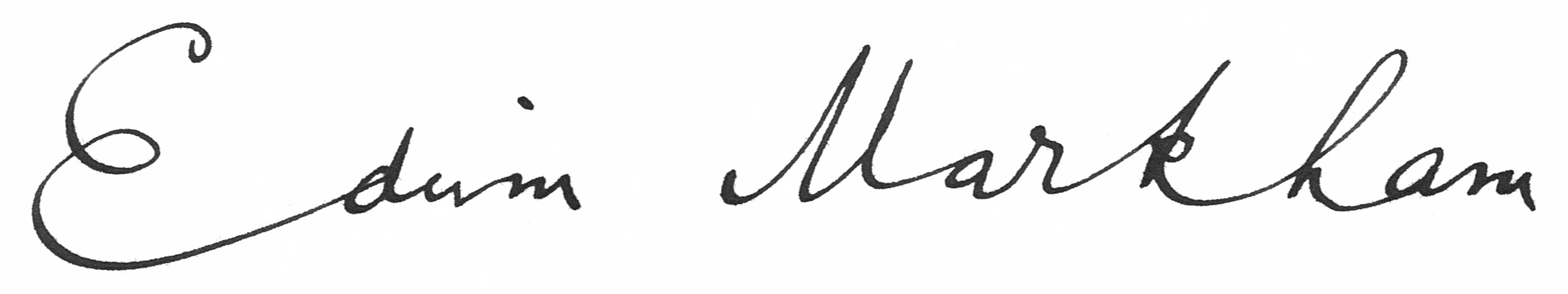

Edwin Markham (born Charles Edward Anson Markham; April 23, 1852 – March 7, 1940) was an American poet. From 1923 to 1931 he was Poet Laureate of Oregon.

== Early life and education ==
Edwin Markham was born in Oregon City, Oregon, and was the youngest of 10 children; his parents divorced shortly after his birth. At the age of four, he moved with his mother to Lagoon Valley in Solano County, California. He obtained a teaching certificate in 1870 from Pacific Methodist College in Vacaville. Markham then attended San Jose Normal School (now San Jose State University) graduating in 1872, and wrote the poem "The Man with the Hoe". The house in which he wrote the poem was preserved and moved to the city's History Park, and now serves as a poetry center. He went by "Charles" until about 1895, when he was about 43, when he started using "Edwin." He also studied at Christian College in Santa Rosa, California, in 1873.

== Career ==
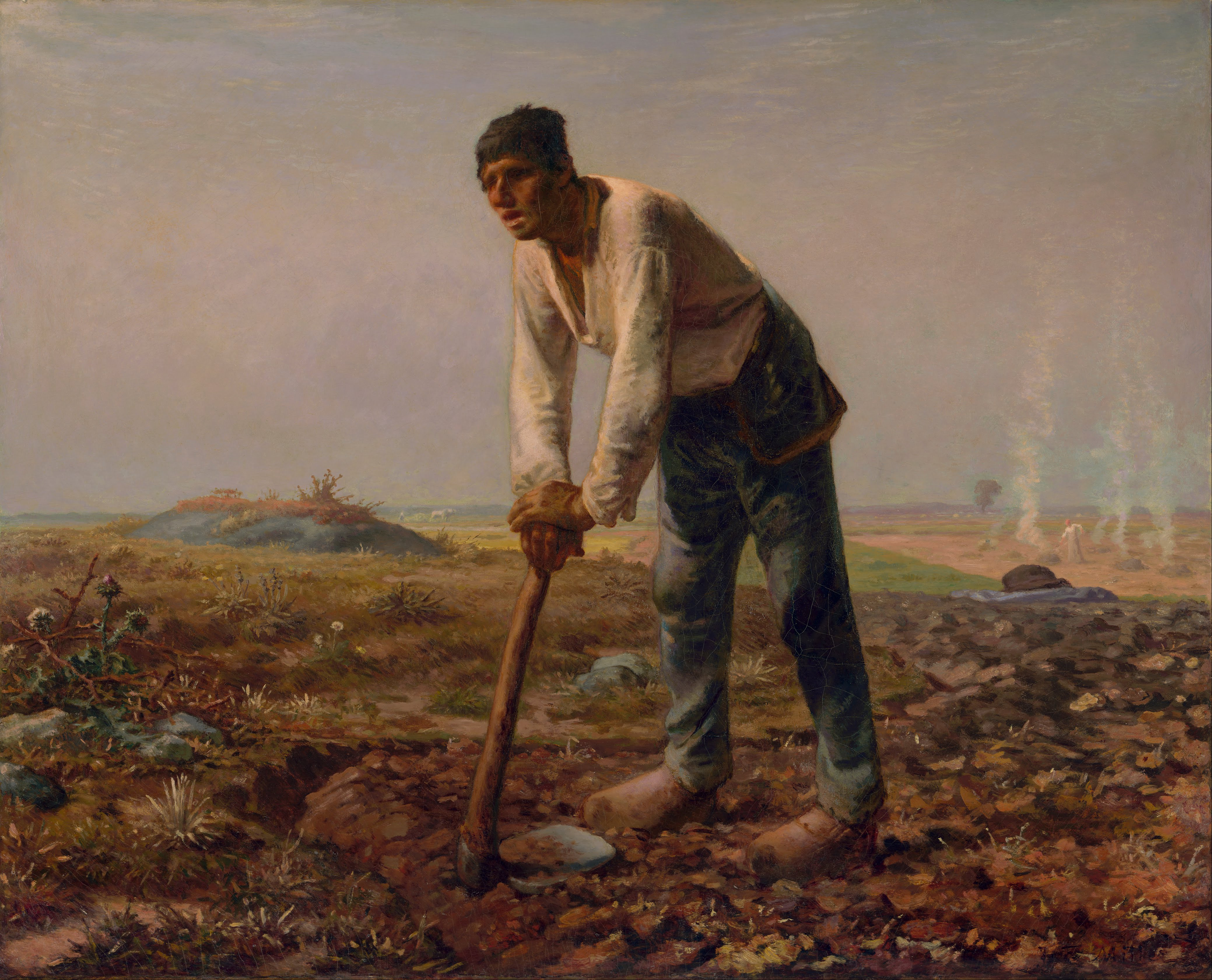
L'homme à la houe by Jean-François Millet

Markham taught literature in El Dorado County until 1879, when he became education superintendent of the county. While residing in El Dorado County, Markham became a member of Placerville Masonic Lodge. He also accepted a job as principal of Tompkins Observation School in Oakland, California, in 1890. While in Oakland, he became well acquainted with many other famous contemporary writers and poets, such as Joaquin Miller, Ina Coolbrith, and Charles Warren Stoddard.

Markham's most famous poem, "The Man with the Hoe," which accented laborers' hardships, was first presented at a public poetry reading in 1898. His main inspiration was a French painting of the same name (in French, L'homme à la houe) by Jean-François Millet. Markham's poem was published, and it became quite popular very soon. In New York, he gave many lectures to labor groups. These happened as often as his poetry readings.

His 1904 edition of the works of Edgar Allan Poe was followed by multiple volumes of The Real America in Romance, issued from 1909 through 1927 by New York publisher W. H. Wise. His edited works included several collections of British and American poetry. An accomplished and popular lecturer, Markham also wrote essays, popular articles that discussed his own compositional approaches, and introductions to the works of others. Among the latter, his subjects included John Keats, John Greenleaf Whittier, and Henry Wadsworth Longfellow. His efforts to raise public awareness of social ills were capped by contributions to a major volume examining child labor, Children in Bondage, in 1914.

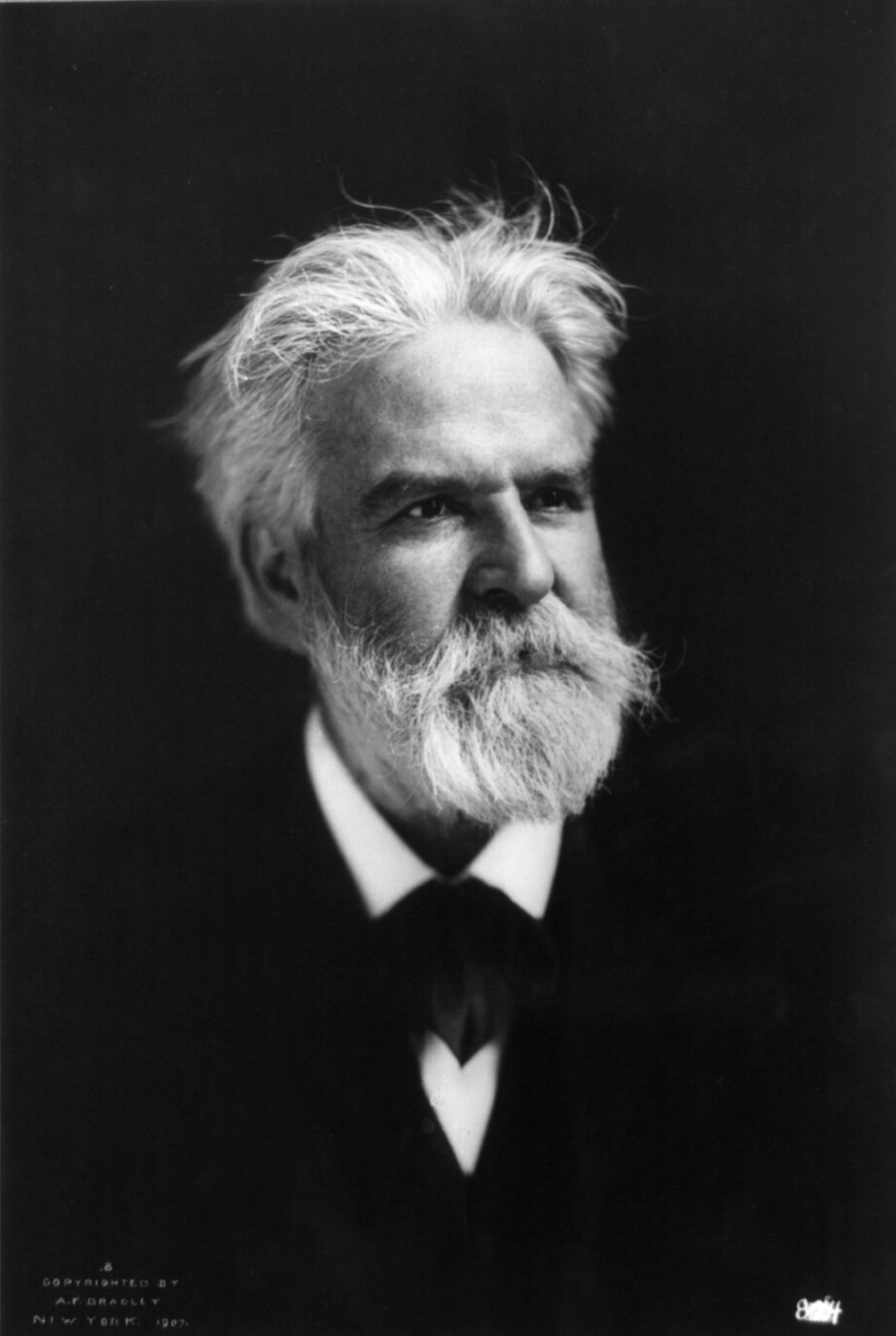
A photograph of Markham in his later years

In 1922, Markham's poem "Lincoln, the Man of the People" was selected from 250 entries to be presented at the dedication of the Lincoln Memorial. The author himself read the poem. Dr. Henry Van Dyke of Princeton said of the poem, "Edwin Markham's Lincoln is the greatest poem ever written on the immortal martyr, and the greatest that ever will be written." Later that year, Markham was filmed reciting the poem by Lee De Forest in his Phonofilm sound-on-film process.

As recounted by literary biographer William R. Nash, "'['b]etween publications, Markham lectured and wrote in other genres, including essays and nonfiction prose. He also gave much of his time to organizations such as the Poetry Society of America, which he established in 1910. In 1922, at the conclusion to the dedication of the Lincoln Memorial, Markham read a revised version of his poem, "Lincoln the Man of the People." Markham also wrote a number of epigrams, of which the best known is Outwitted.

Throughout Markham's later life, many readers viewed him as an important voice in American poetry, a position signified by honors such as his election in 1908 to the National Institute of Arts and Letters. Despite his numerous accolades, however, none of his later books achieved the success of the first two.

American etiquette expert Amy Vanderbilt has said that Markham's single verse poem "Circles of Love" was written while Markham was a guest at her family home on Staten Island.

== Personal life ==
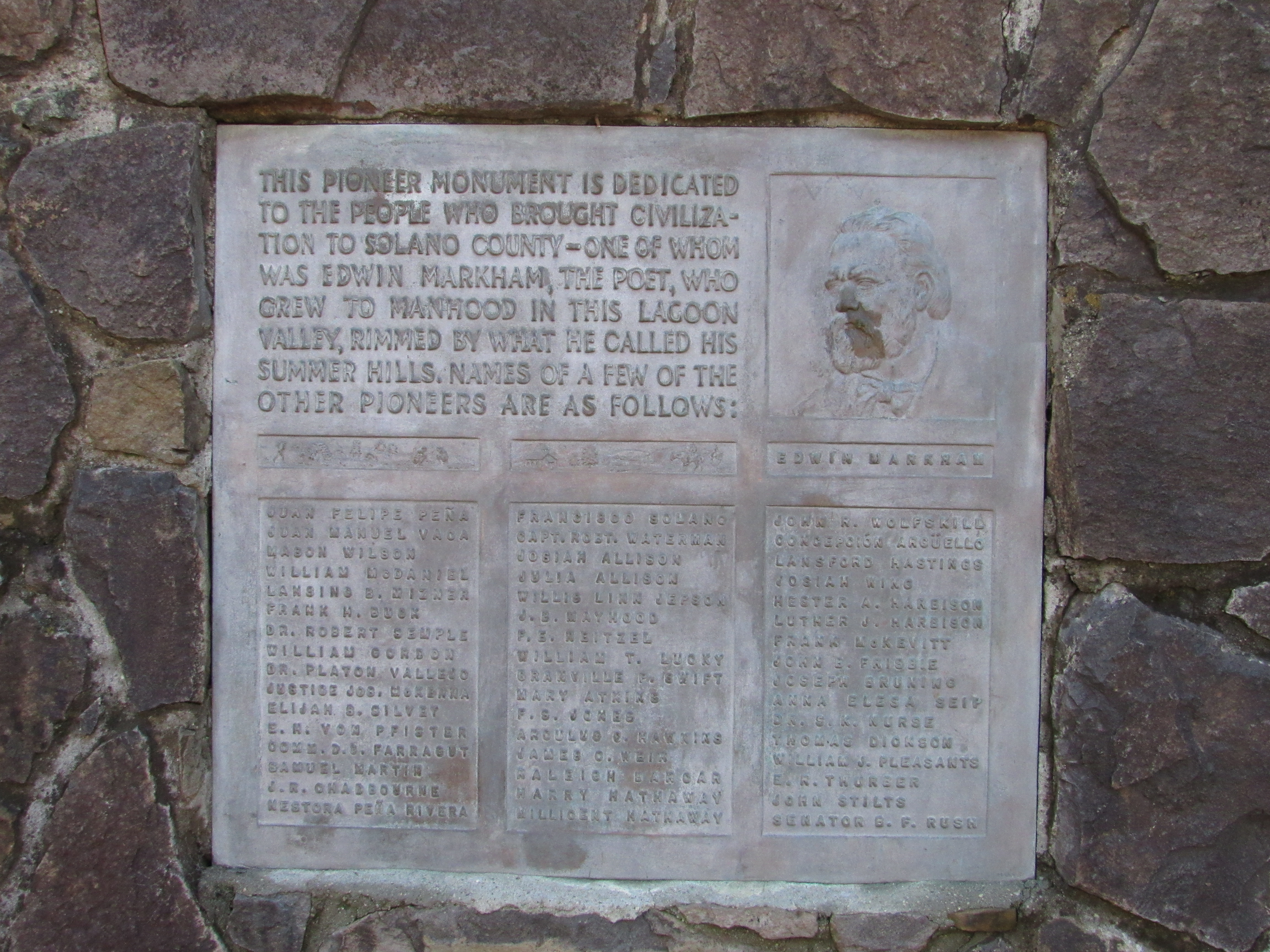
The Pioneer Monument at Pena Adobe Park, which features an engraving of Markham

In 1898, Markham married his third wife, Anna Catherine Murphy (1859–1938), and in 1899 their son Virgil Markham was born. They moved to Rio de Janeiro in 1900 to study natives and their appeasement, then to New York City, where they lived in Brooklyn and then Great Kills, Staten Island.

Markham was an admirer of economist Henry George, who he considered "one of the supreme heroes of humanity."

== Legacy ==
By the time of his death, Markham had amassed a huge library of over 15,000 books. This collection was bequeathed to Wagner College's Horrmann Library on Staten Island. Markham also willed his personal papers to the library. His correspondents included Franklin D. Roosevelt, Ambrose Bierce, Aleister Crowley, Jack and Charmian London, Zoe Anderson Norris, Carl Sandburg, Florence Earle Coates and Amy Lowell.

Six schools in California were named in honor of Markham. Three schools, all named Edwin Markham Elementary School, are in Oakland, Vacaville and Hayward, and three more are Markham Middle School in the Los Angeles neighborhood of Watts, Edwin Markham Middle School in Placerville, and Edwin Markham Junior High School in San Jose, the last since renamed Willow Glen Middle School.

Schools in other states named in his honor include Edwin Markham Intermediate School 51 in Staten Island, Edwin Markham Elementary north of Pasco, Washington, Edwin Markham Elementary School in Mt. Lebanon, Pennsylvania, and Markham Elementary in Portland, Oregon.

A playground in New York City was given his name in 1985.

In 1916, American composer Alice Marion Shaw set Markham’s text to music in her song “To Go and Forget.”

The Liberty Ship Edwin Markham was launched on May 5, 1942.

A street in the Palomares Hills neighborhood of Castro Valley, California bears his name (Edwin Markham Drive), as does a street in Mt. Lebanon, Pennsylvania (Markham Drive), which is nearby the aforementioned eponymous elementary school.

The Markham Houses is a complex on Staten Island, as is a street there.

Markham House, his residence until 1889, is now in History Park in San Jose, California and houses the Poetry Center San José.

A historical marker in Peña Adobe Park in Vacaville, California bears an engraving of Markham.

Since 2010, literary journal Reed Magazine (headquartered at Markham's alma mater San José State University) has exhibited the Edwin Markham Prize for Poetry, awarding poets a $1,000 prize and publication, as chosen by noted poets.

== Bibliography ==
Poetry collections

- The Man With the Hoe and Other Poems (1899)
- Lincoln and Other Poems (1901)
- The Real America in Romance, issued from 1909 through 1927 by New York publisher W. H. Wise (1909 through 1927)
- The Shoes of Happiness and Other Poems (1913)
- Gates of Paradise (1920)
- Eighty Poems at Eighty (1932)
- The Ballad of the Gallows Bird (published 1960)

Prose

- Children in Bondage (1914)
- California the Wonderful (1914)

== See also ==
- Edwin Markham House
- Leacy Naylor Green-Leach
