= Shepherdess Seated on a Rock =

Painting by Jean-François Millet

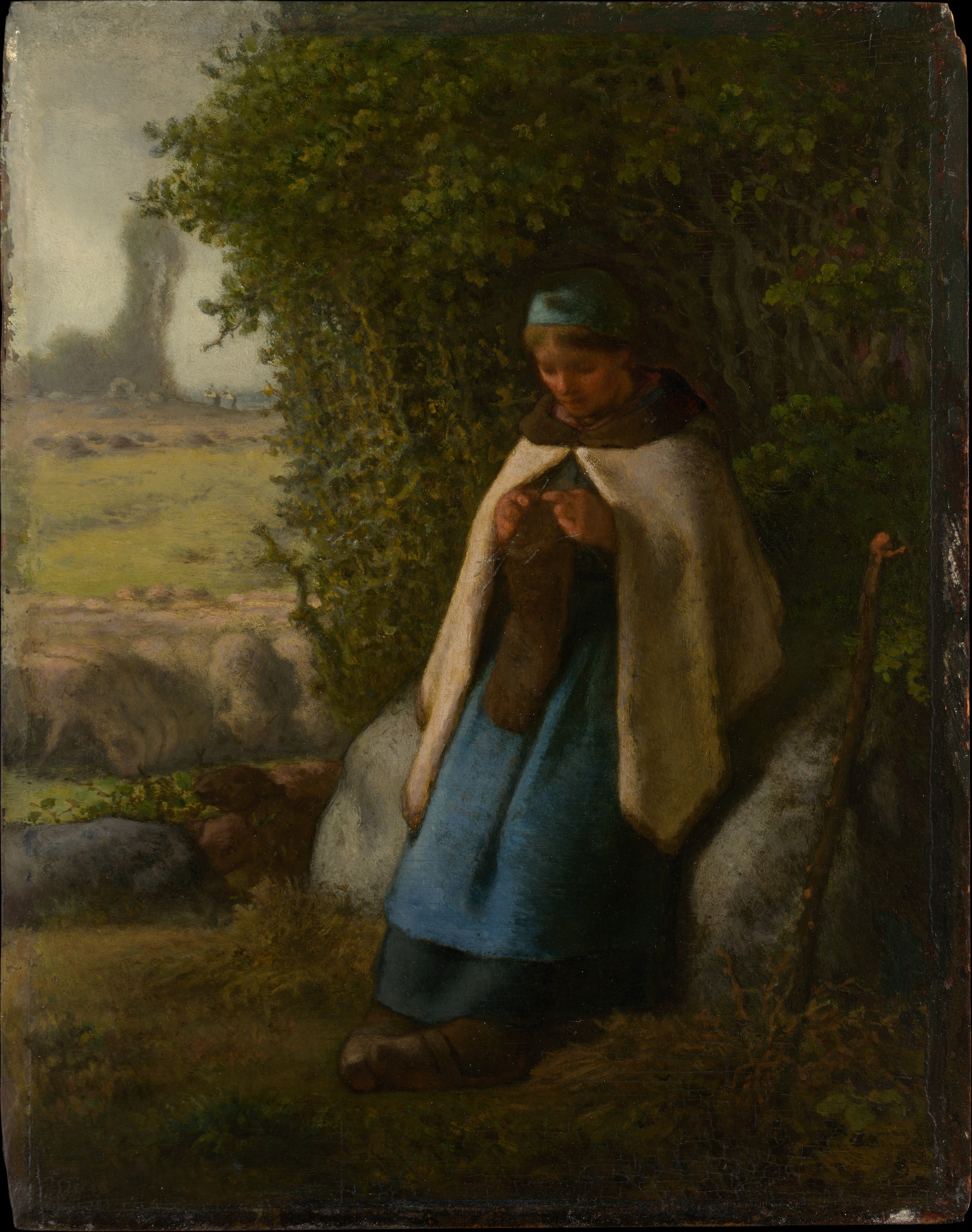
- Artist: Jean-François Millet
- Year: 1856
- Medium: Oil on wood
- Dimensions: 35.9 cm × 28.3 cm (14.1 in × 11.1 in)
- Location: Metropolitan Museum of Art, New York
- Accession: 1983.446

Shepherdess Seated on a Rock or The Knitter or Shepherdess Knitting is an 1856 oil-on-wood painting by Jean-François Millet. It is in the collection of the Metropolitan Museum of Art in New York.

Millet was a leader of the Barbizon school, which emphasized realism, and is noted for his scenes of peasant farmers and for reinvigorating the genre of landscape painting. The shepherdess in this painting is wearing the linen hood and white cloak that were typical of the peasant women in communities of north-central France such as Barbizon.

This painting at the Metropolitan Museum of Art is virtually identical to another at the Cincinnati Art Museum. The reason for the duplication is that Millet was painting the first one when he received an offer for it, but as he had already promised the painting to someone else he painted another. This was the only time that Millet ever duplicated one of his paintings. There are many other similar paintings by Millet depicting a shepherdess who is knitting, though they are not duplicates.

Before painting the two duplicates, Millet composed a preparatory drawing, which is now located at the National Gallery of Scotland. According to that gallery, "Millet’s paintings of shepherdesses were greatly admired, and inspired Vincent van Gogh to pay homage to Millet in his own work."

== Related Works ==
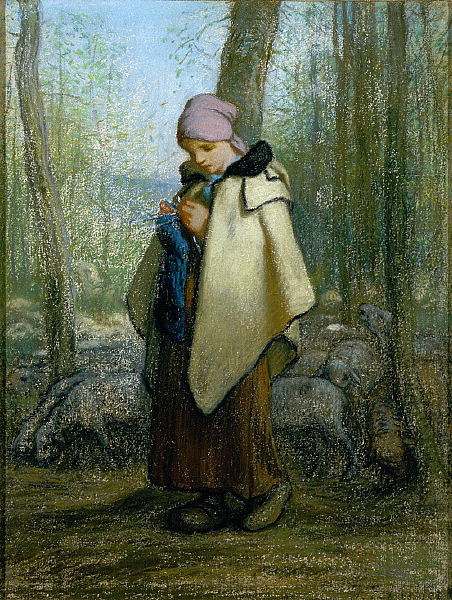
The Knitting Shepherdess, c. 1856-1857, Saint Louis Art Museum

Shepherdess Sitting at the Edge of the Forest, c. 1848-1849, Museum of Fine Arts Boston

《A Shepherdess》, 1849년, Burrell Collection

Seated Shepherdess, c. 1852, Minneapolis Institute of Art

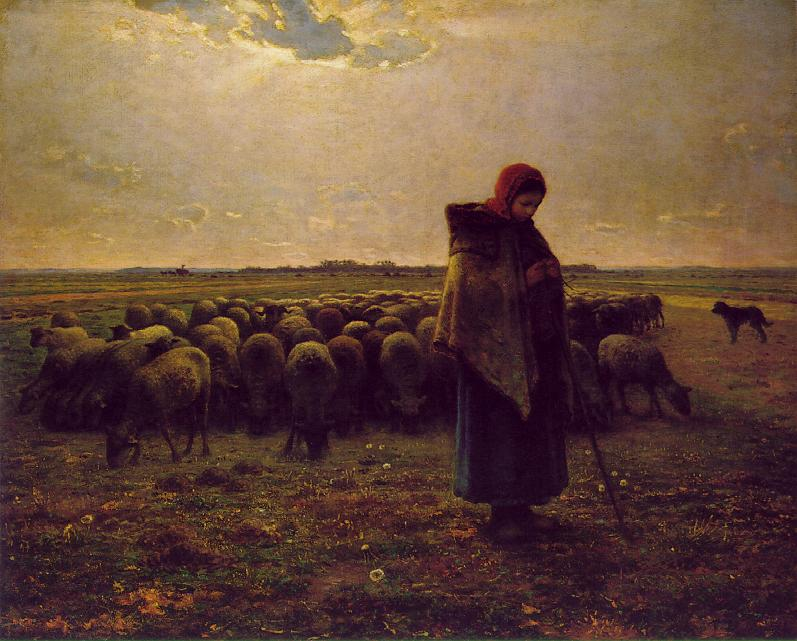
Shepherdess with her Flock, c. 1863년, Musée d'Orsay

Shepherdess Seated in the Shade, 1872, Museum of Fine Arts Boston

Young Girl Guarding her Sheep, c. 1860-1862, Clark Art Institute
