= Jean-François Millet =

French painter (1814–1875)

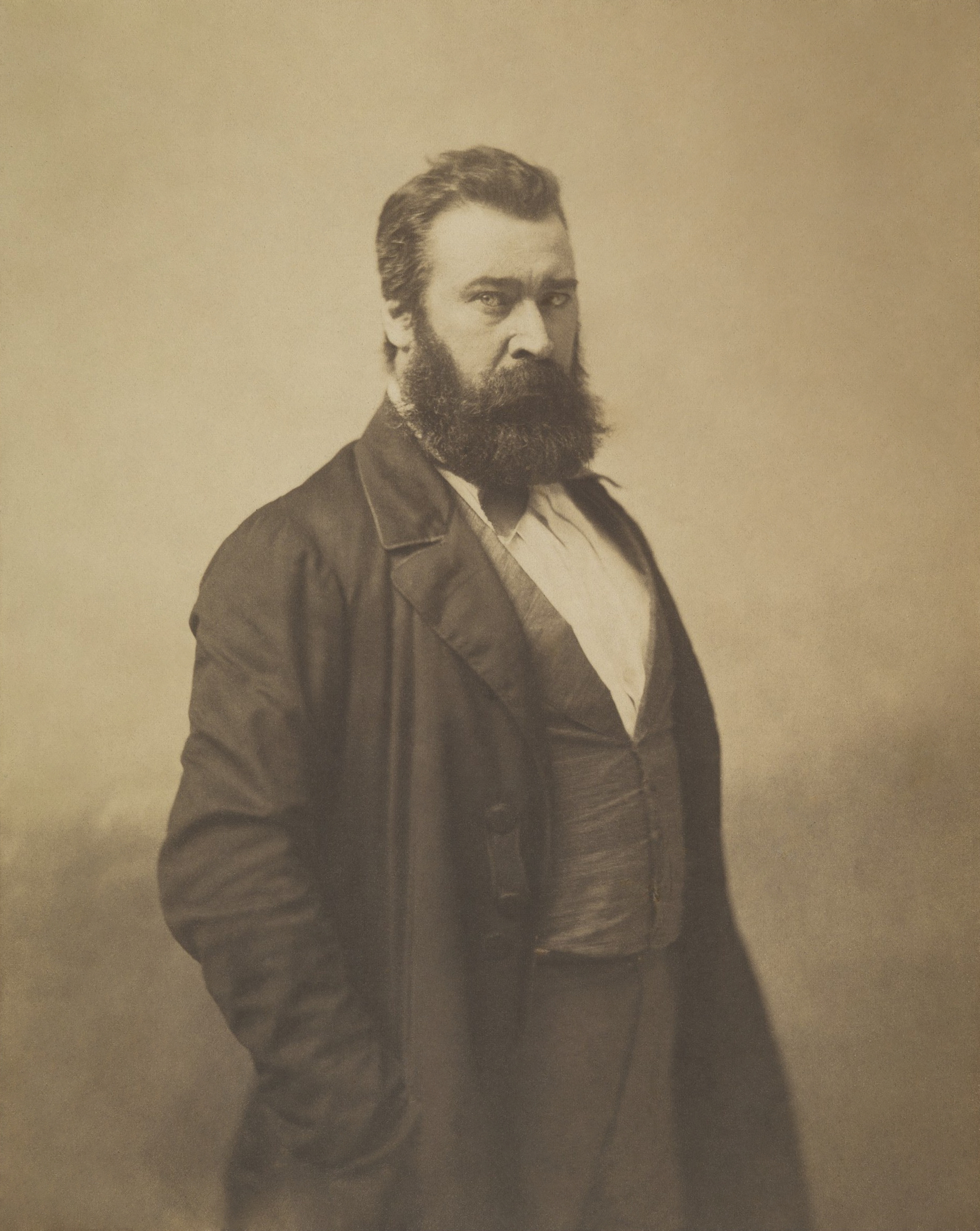
- Portrait by Nadar, c. 1856–1858
- Born: Jean-François Millet; 4 October 1814; Gruchy, Gréville-Hague, Normandy, France
- Died: 20 January 1875 (aged 60); Barbizon, Île de France, France
- Known for: Painting
- Notable work: The Gleaners
- Movement: Realism

Jean-François Millet (French pronunciation: [ʒɑ̃ fʁɑ̃swa milɛ]; 4 October 1814 – 20 January 1875) was a French painter and one of the founders of the Barbizon School in rural France. Millet is noted for his paintings of peasant farmers and can be categorized as part of the Realism art movement. Toward the end of his career, he became increasingly interested in painting pure landscapes. He is known best for his oil paintings but is also noted for his pastels, Conté crayon drawings, and etchings.

== Life and work ==
=== Youth ===
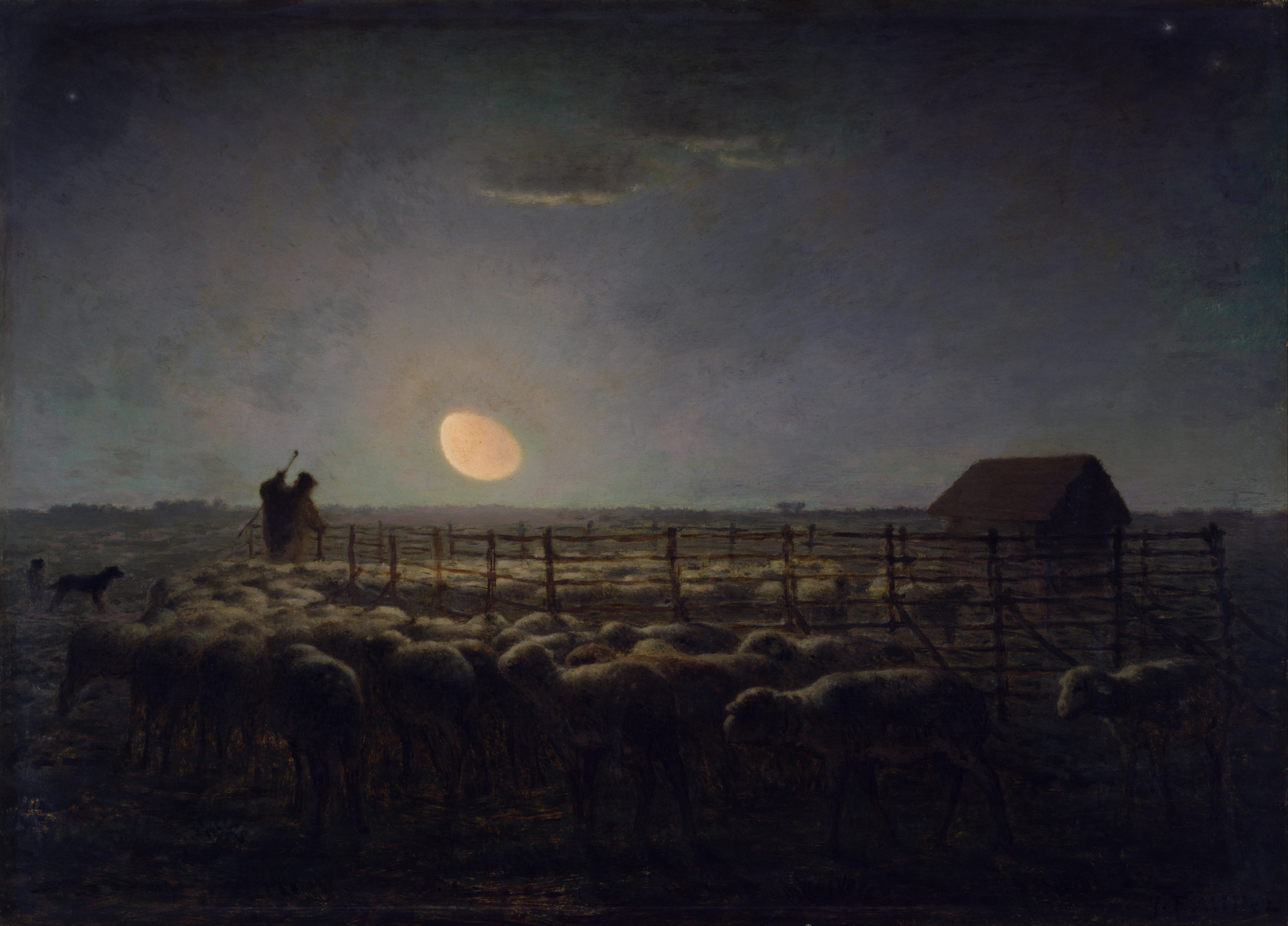
The Sheepfold. In this painting by Millet, the waning Moon throws a mysterious light across the plain between the villages of Barbizon and Chailly. The Walters Art Museum.

Millet was the first child of Jean-Louis-Nicolas and Aimée-Henriette-Adélaïde Henry Millet, members of the farming community in the village of Gruchy, in Gréville-Hague, Normandy, close to the coast. Under the guidance of two village priests—one of them was vicar Jean Lebrisseux—Millet acquired a knowledge of Latin and modern authors. But soon he had to help his father with the farm work, because Millet was the eldest of the sons. So all the farmer's work was familiar to him: mowing, making hay, binding the sheaves, threshing, winnowing, spreading manure, ploughing, sowing, etc. All these motifs returned in his later art.

In 1833, his father sent him to Cherbourg to study with a portrait painter named Bon Du Mouchel. By 1835 he was studying with Théophile Langlois de Chèvreville, a pupil of Baron Gros, in Cherbourg. A stipend provided by Langlois and others enabled Millet to move to Paris in 1837, where he studied at the École des Beaux-Arts with Paul Delaroche. In 1839, his scholarship was terminated, and his first submission to the Salon, Saint Anne Instructing the Virgin, was rejected by the jury.

=== Paris ===
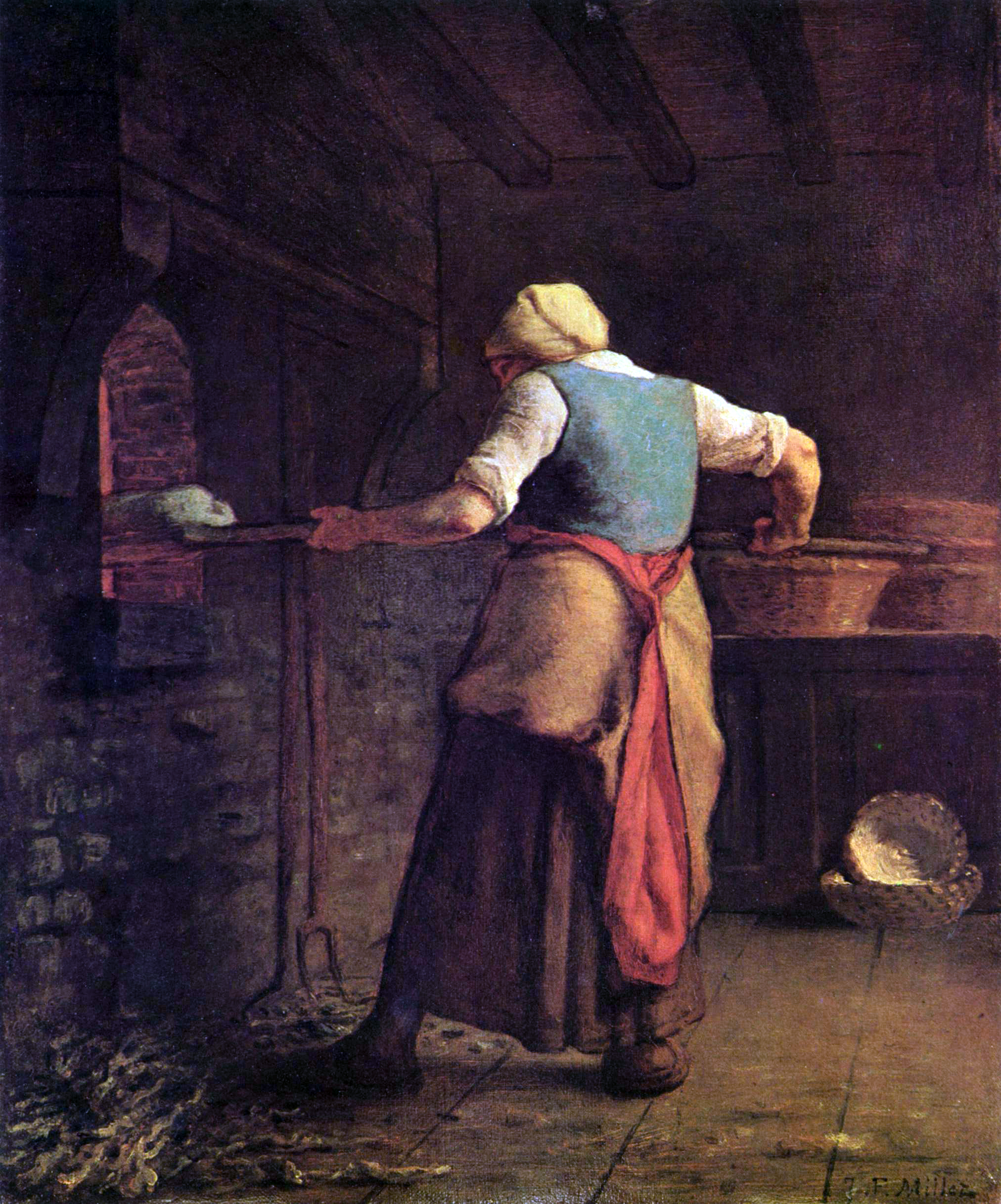
Woman Baking Bread, 1854. Kröller-Müller Museum, Otterlo.

After his first painting, a portrait, was accepted at the Salon of 1840, Millet returned to Cherbourg to begin a career as a portrait painter. The following year he married Pauline-Virginie Ono, and they moved to Paris. After rejections at the Salon of 1843 and Pauline's death by consumption in April 1844, Millet returned again to Cherbourg. In 1845, Millet moved to Le Havre with Catherine Lemaire, whom he married in a civil ceremony in 1853; they had nine children and remained together for the rest of Millet's life. In Le Havre he painted portraits and small genre pieces for several months, before moving back to Paris.

It was in Paris in the middle 1840s that Millet befriended Constant Troyon, Narcisse Diaz, Charles Jacque, and Théodore Rousseau, artists who, like Millet, became associated with the Barbizon school; Honoré Daumier, whose figure draftsmanship influenced Millet's subsequent rendering of peasant subjects; and fr:Alfred Sensier, a government bureaucrat who became a lifelong supporter and eventually the artist's biographer. In 1847, his first Salon success came with the exhibition of a painting Oedipus Taken down from the Tree, and in 1848, his Winnower was bought by the government.

The Captivity of the Jews in Babylon, Millet's most ambitious work at the time, was unveiled at the Salon of 1848, but was scorned by art critics and the public alike. The painting eventually disappeared shortly thereafter, leading historians to believe that Millet destroyed it. In 1984, scientists at the Museum of Fine Arts in Boston x-rayed Millet's 1870 painting The Young Shepherdess looking for minor changes, and discovered that it was painted over Captivity. It is now believed that Millet reused the canvas when materials were in short supply during the Franco-Prussian War.

=== Barbizon ===
In 1849, Millet painted Harvesters, a commission for the state. In the Salon of that year, he exhibited Shepherdess Sitting at the Edge of the Forest, a very small oil painting which marked a turning away from previous idealized pastoral subjects, in favor of a more realistic and personal approach. In June of that year, he settled in Barbizon with Catherine and their children.

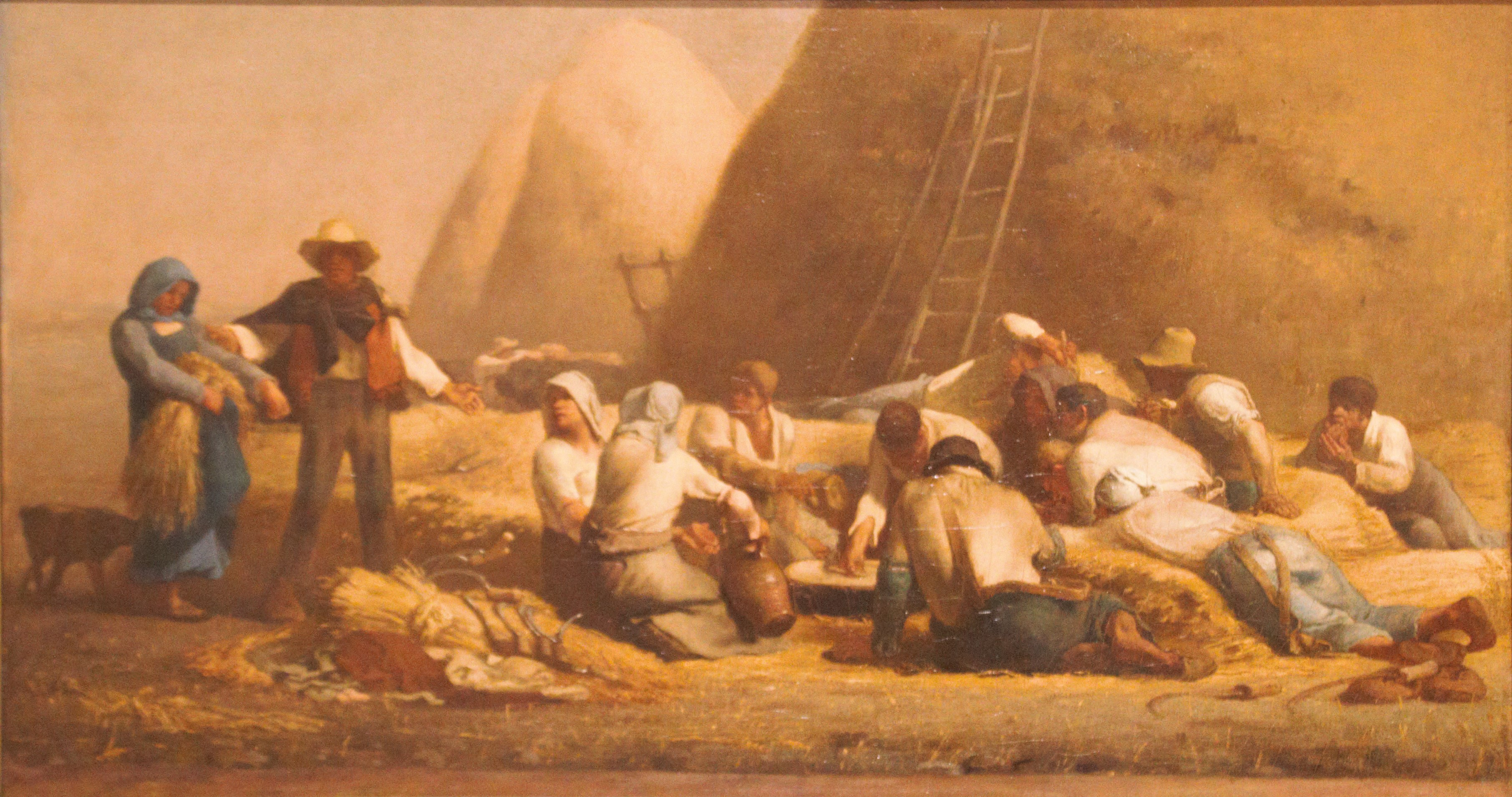
Harvesters Resting (Ruth and Boaz), Museum of Fine Arts, Boston (1850–1853)

In 1850, Millet entered into an arrangement with Sensier, who provided the artist with materials and money in return for drawings and paintings, while Millet simultaneously was free to continue selling work to other buyers as well. At that year's Salon, he exhibited Haymakers and The Sower, his first major masterpiece and the earliest of the iconic trio of paintings that included The Gleaners and The Angelus.

From 1850 to 1853, Millet worked on Harvesters Resting (Ruth and Boaz), a painting he considered his most important, and on which he worked the longest. Conceived to rival his heroes Michelangelo and Poussin, it was also the painting that marked his transition from the depiction of symbolic imagery of peasant life to that of contemporary social conditions. It was the only painting he ever dated, and was the first work to garner him official recognition, a second-class medal at the Salon of 1853.

In the mid-1850s, Millet produced a small number of etchings of peasant subjects, such as Man with a Wheelbarrow (1855) and Woman Carding Wool (1855–1857).

==== The Gleaners ====
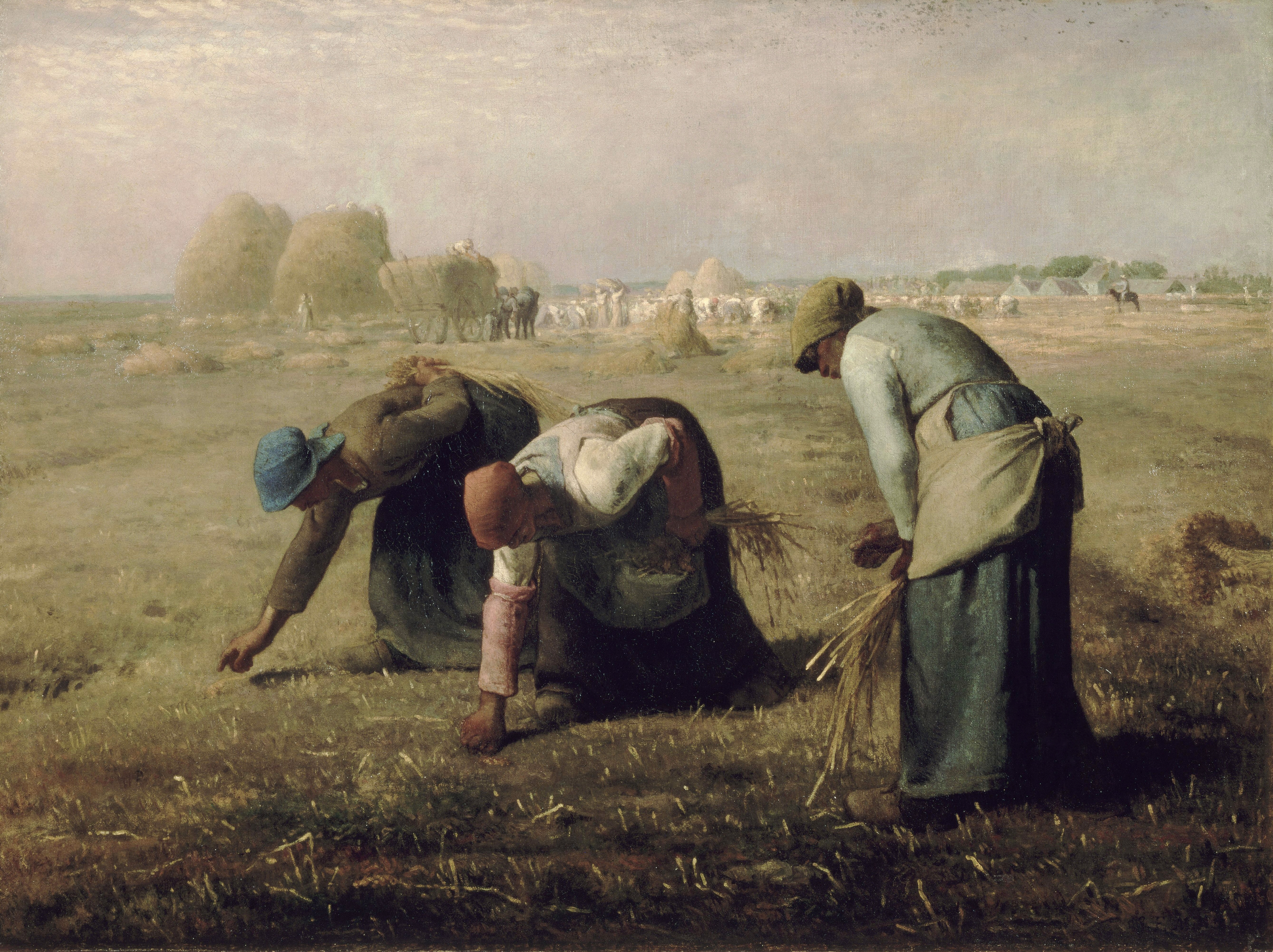
The Gleaners, 1857. Musée d'Orsay, Paris.

This is one of the most well known of Millet's paintings, The Gleaners (1857). While Millet was walking the fields around Barbizon, one theme returned to his pencil and brush for seven years—gleaning—the centuries-old right of poor women and children to remove the bits of grain left in the fields following the harvest. He found the theme an eternal one, linked to stories from the Old Testament. In 1857, he submitted the painting The Gleaners to the Salon to an unenthusiastic, even hostile, public.

(Earlier versions include a vertical composition painted in 1854, an etching of 1855–56 which directly presaged the horizontal format of the painting now in the Musée d'Orsay.)

During his years of preparatory studies, Millet contemplated how best to convey the sense of repetition and fatigue in the peasants' daily lives. Lines traced over each woman's back lead to the ground and then back up in a repetitive motion identical to their unending, backbreaking labor. Along the horizon, the setting sun silhouettes the farm with its abundant stacks of grain, in contrast to the large shadowy figures in the foreground. The dark homespun dresses of the gleaners cut robust forms against the golden field, giving each woman an aura of strength.

==== The Angelus ====
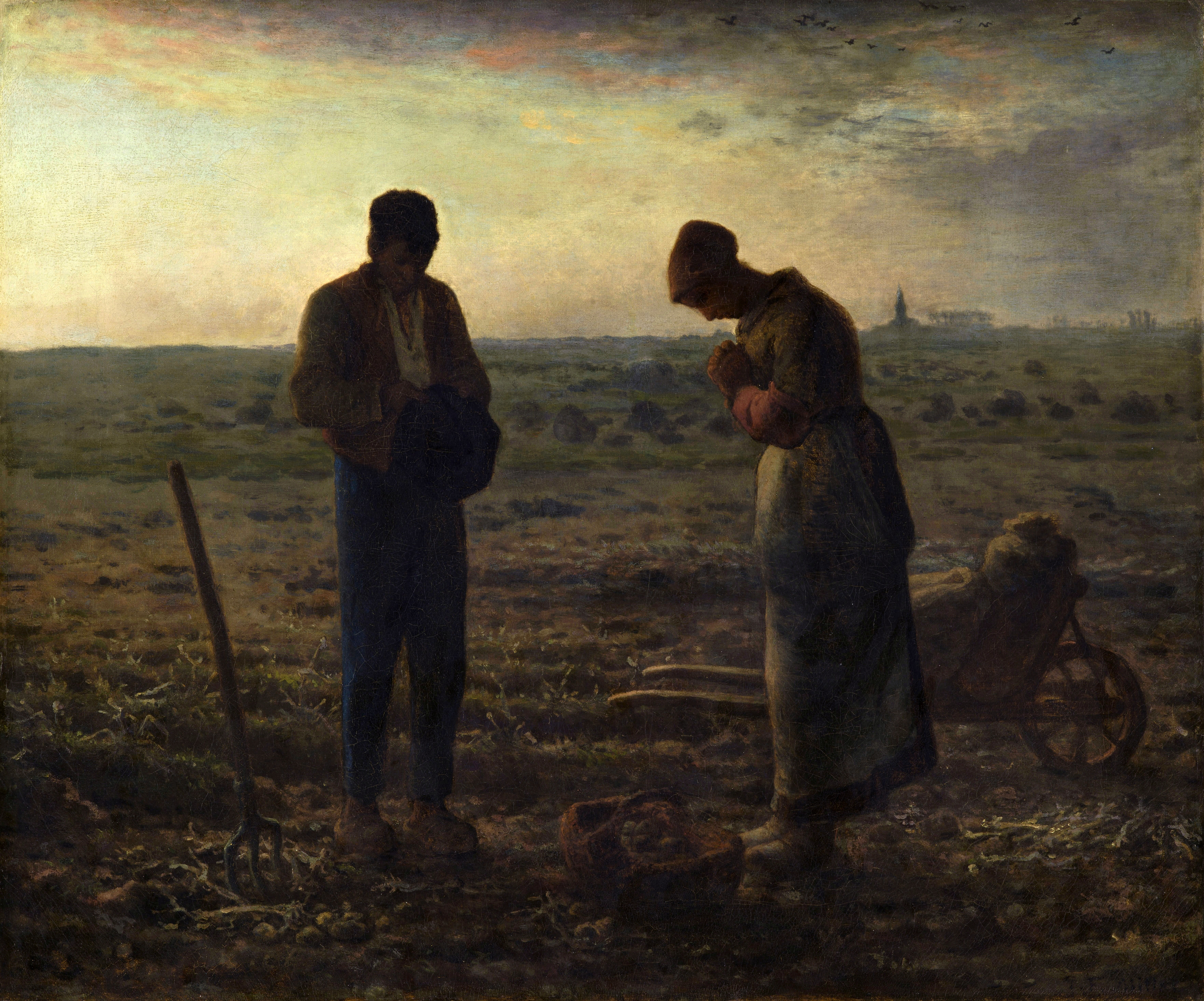
The Angelus, 1857–1859, Musée d'Orsay, Paris.

The painting was commissioned by Thomas Gold Appleton, an American art collector based in Boston, Massachusetts. Appleton previously studied with Millet's friend, the Barbizon painter Constant Troyon. It was completed during the summer of 1857. Millet added a steeple and changed the initial title of the work, Prayer for the Potato Crop to The Angelus when the purchaser failed to take possession of it in 1859. Displayed to the public for the first time in 1865, the painting changed hands several times, increasing only modestly in value, since some considered the artist's political sympathies suspect. Upon Millet's death a decade later, a bidding war between the US and France ensued, ending some years later with a price tag of 800,000 gold francs.

The disparity between the apparent value of the painting and the poor estate of Millet's surviving family was a major impetus in the invention of the droit de suite, intended to compensate artists or their heirs when works are resold.

=== Later years ===
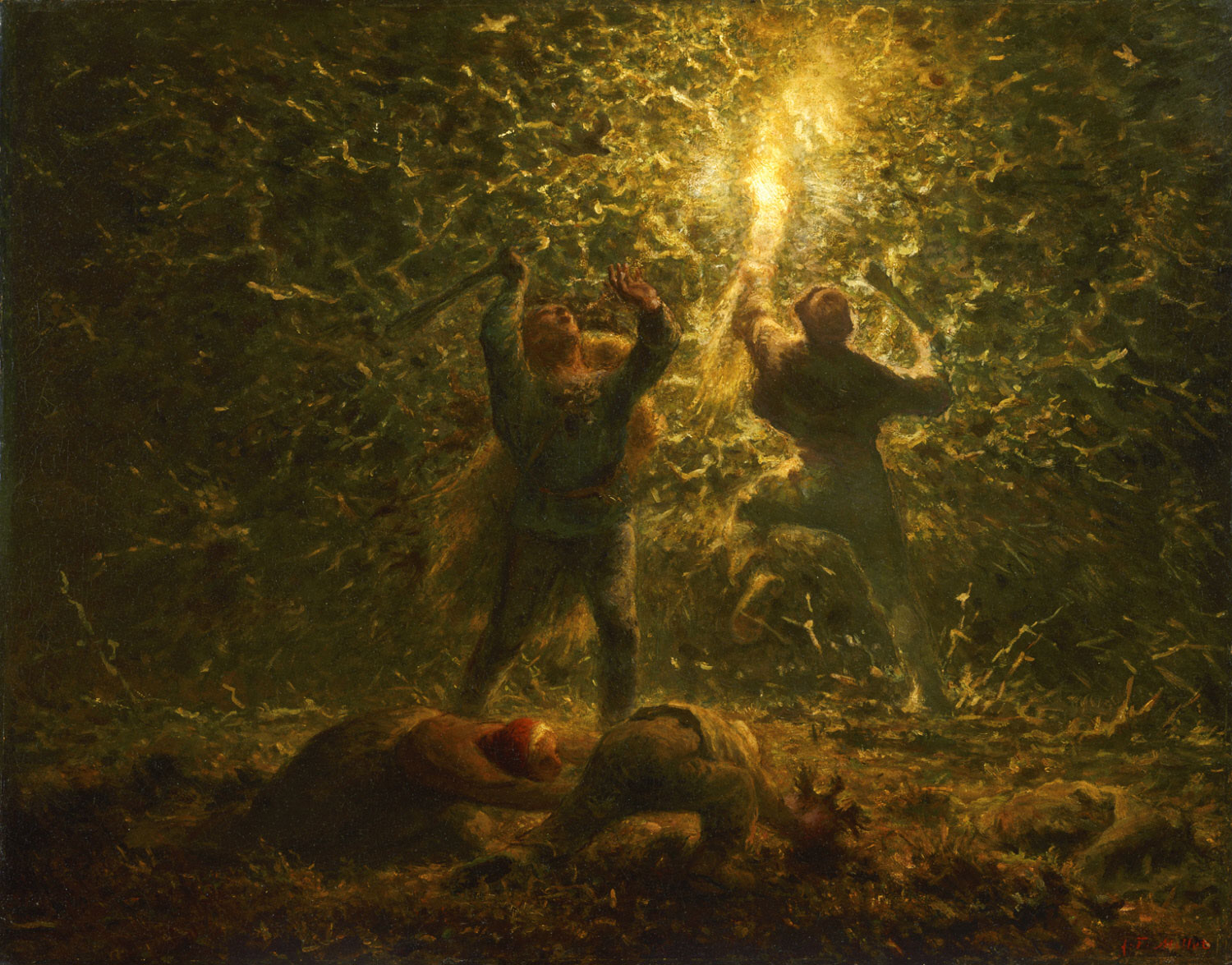
Hunting Birds at Night, 1874, Philadelphia Museum of Art.

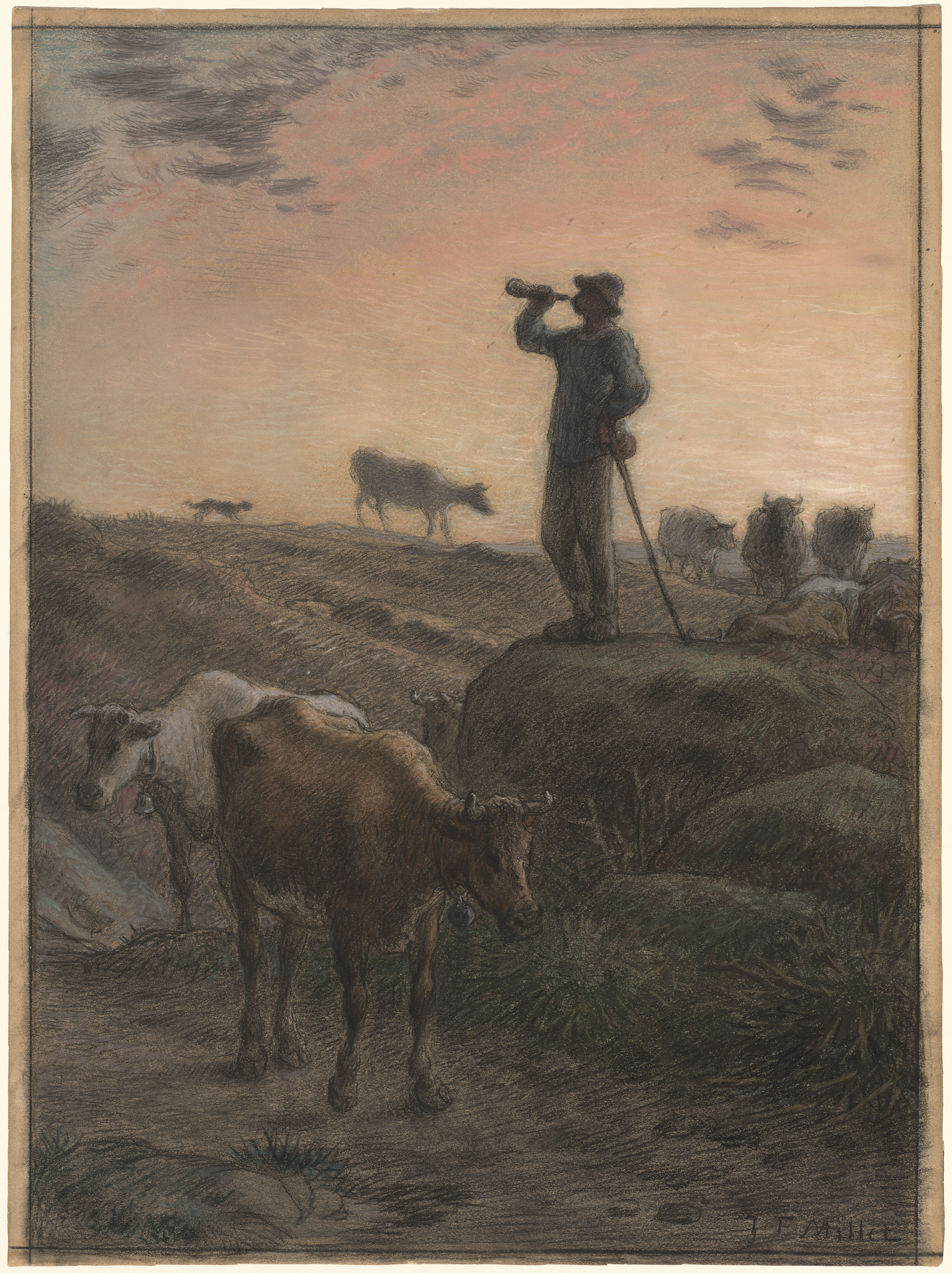
Calling Home the Cows, c. 1866, National Gallery of Art.

Despite mixed reviews of the paintings he exhibited at the Salon, Millet's reputation and success grew throughout the 1860s. At the beginning of the decade, he contracted to paint 25 works in return for a monthly stipend for the next three years and in 1865, another patron, Emile Gavet, began commissioning pastels for a collection that eventually included 90 works. In 1867, the Exposition Universelle hosted a major showing of his work, with the Gleaners, Angelus, and Potato Planters among the paintings exhibited. The following year, Frédéric Hartmann commissioned Four Seasons for 25,000 francs, and Millet was named Chevalier de la Légion d'Honneur.

In 1870, Millet was elected to the Salon jury. Later that year, he and his family fled the Franco-Prussian War, moving to Cherbourg and Gréville, and did not return to Barbizon until late in 1871. His last years were marked by financial success and increased official recognition, but he was unable to fulfill government commissions due to failing health. On 3 January 1875, he married Catherine in a religious ceremony, having married her in a civil ceremony in 1853. Millet died on 20 January 1875.

== Legacy ==
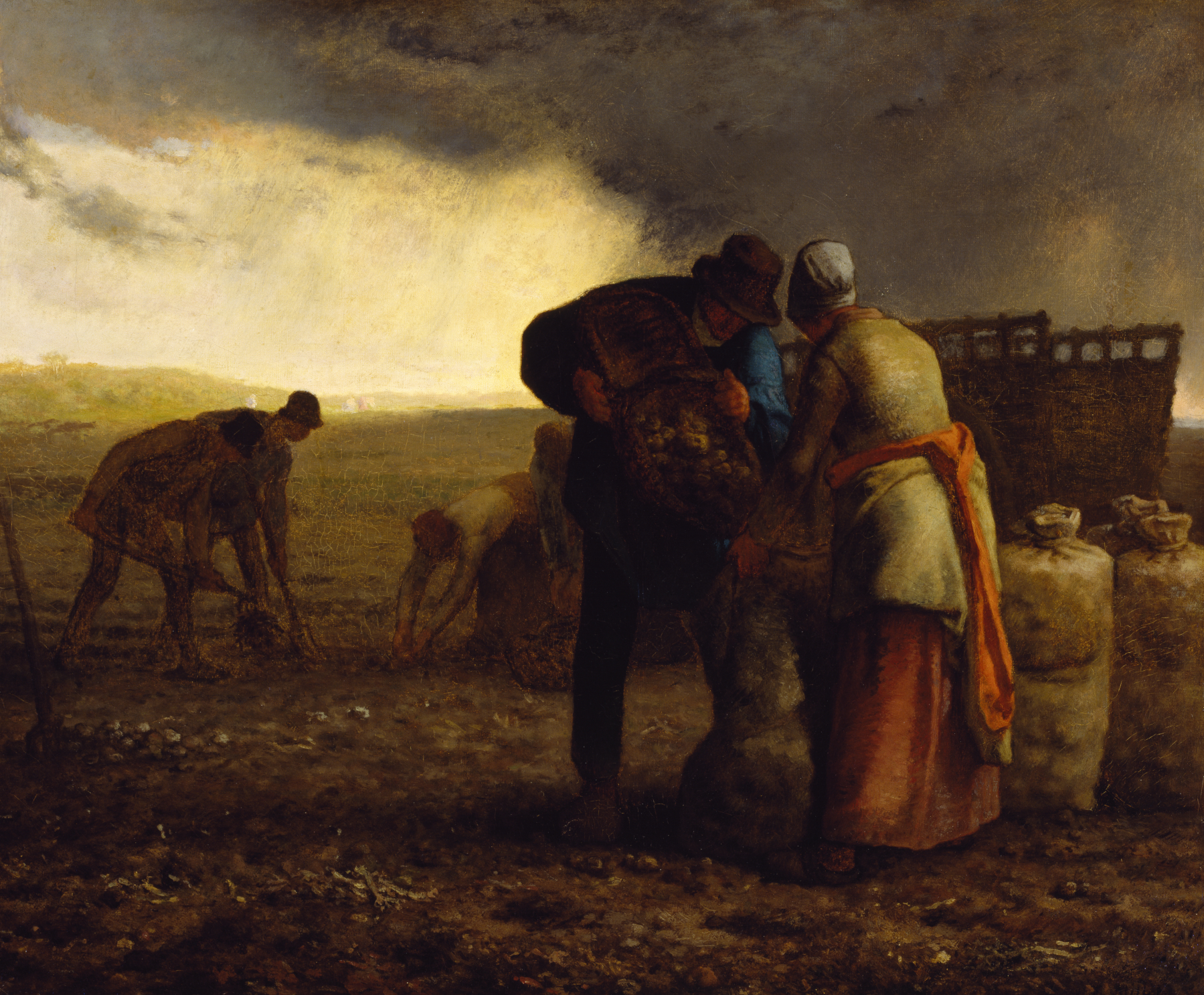
The Potato Harvest (1855). The Walters Art Museum.

Millet was an important source of inspiration for Vincent van Gogh, particularly during his early period. Millet and his work are mentioned many times in Vincent's letters to his brother Theo. Millet's late landscapes served as influential points of reference to Claude Monet's paintings of the coast of Normandy; his structural and symbolic content influenced Georges Seurat as well.

Millet is the main protagonist of Mark Twain's play Is He Dead? (1898), in which he is depicted as a struggling young artist who fakes his death to score fame and fortune. Most of the details about Millet in the play are fictional.

Millet's painting L'homme à la houe inspired the famous poem "The Man With the Hoe" (1898) by Edwin Markham. His paintings also served as the inspiration for American poet David Middleton's collection The Habitual Peacefulness of Gruchy: Poems After Pictures by Jean-François Millet (2005).

The Angelus was reproduced frequently in the 19th and 20th centuries. Salvador Dalí was fascinated by this work, and wrote an analysis of it, The Tragic Myth of The Angelus of Millet. Rather than seeing it as a work of spiritual peace, Dalí believed it held messages of repressed sexual aggression. Dalí was also of the opinion that the two figures were praying over their buried child, rather than to the Angelus. Dalí was so insistent on this fact that eventually an X-ray was done of the canvas, confirming his suspicions: the painting contains a painted-over geometric shape strikingly similar to a coffin. However, it is unclear whether Millet changed his mind on the meaning of the painting, or even if the shape actually is a coffin.

On the 150th anniversary of Millet's death, the National Gallery, London exhibited Millet: Life on the Land; the exhibit organized by Sarah Herring is drawn from loans from around the United Kingdom.

== Gallery ==
Jean-François Millet's paintings

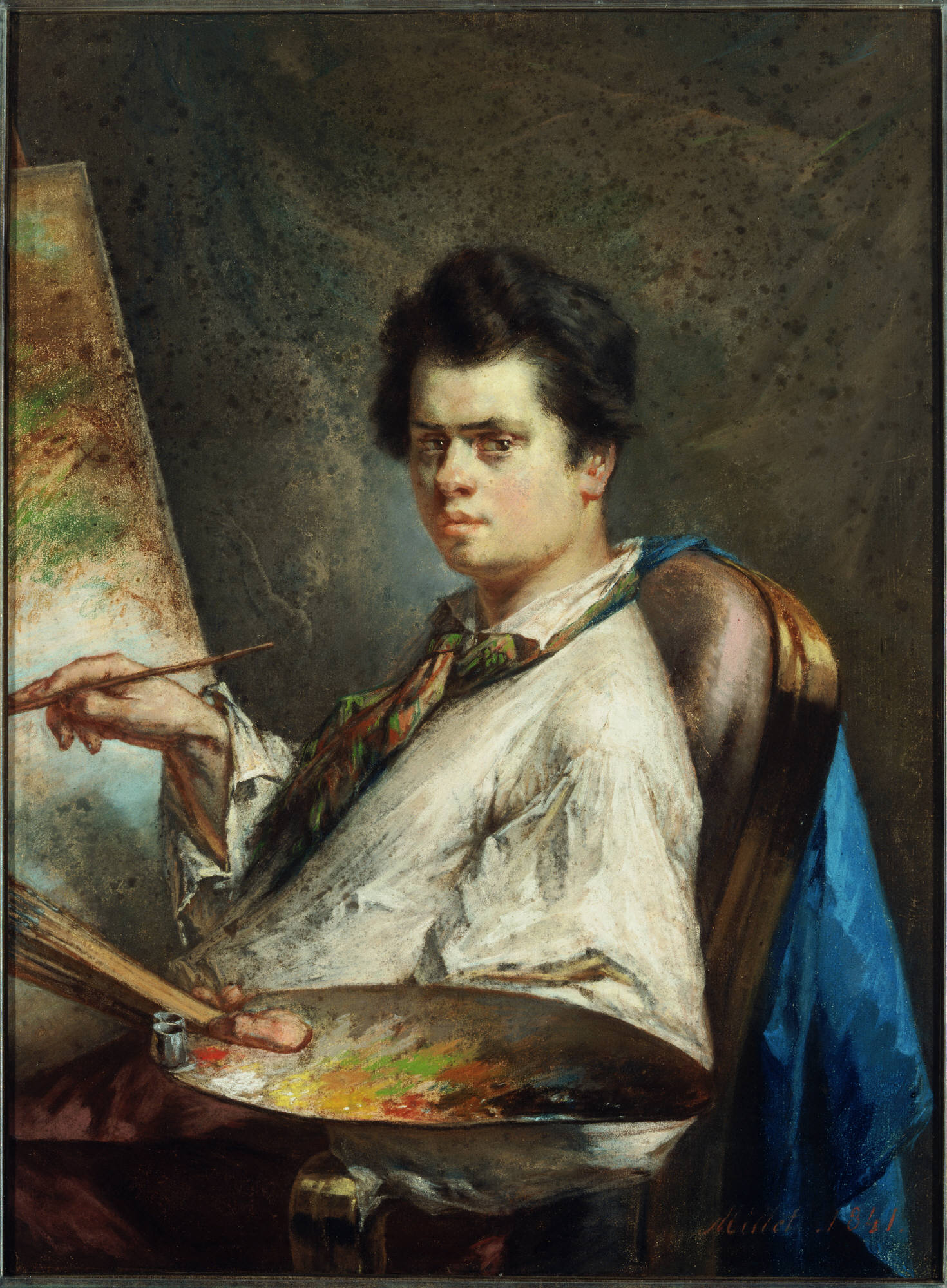
Portrait of Louis-Alexandre Marolles, 1841, Princeton University Art Museum

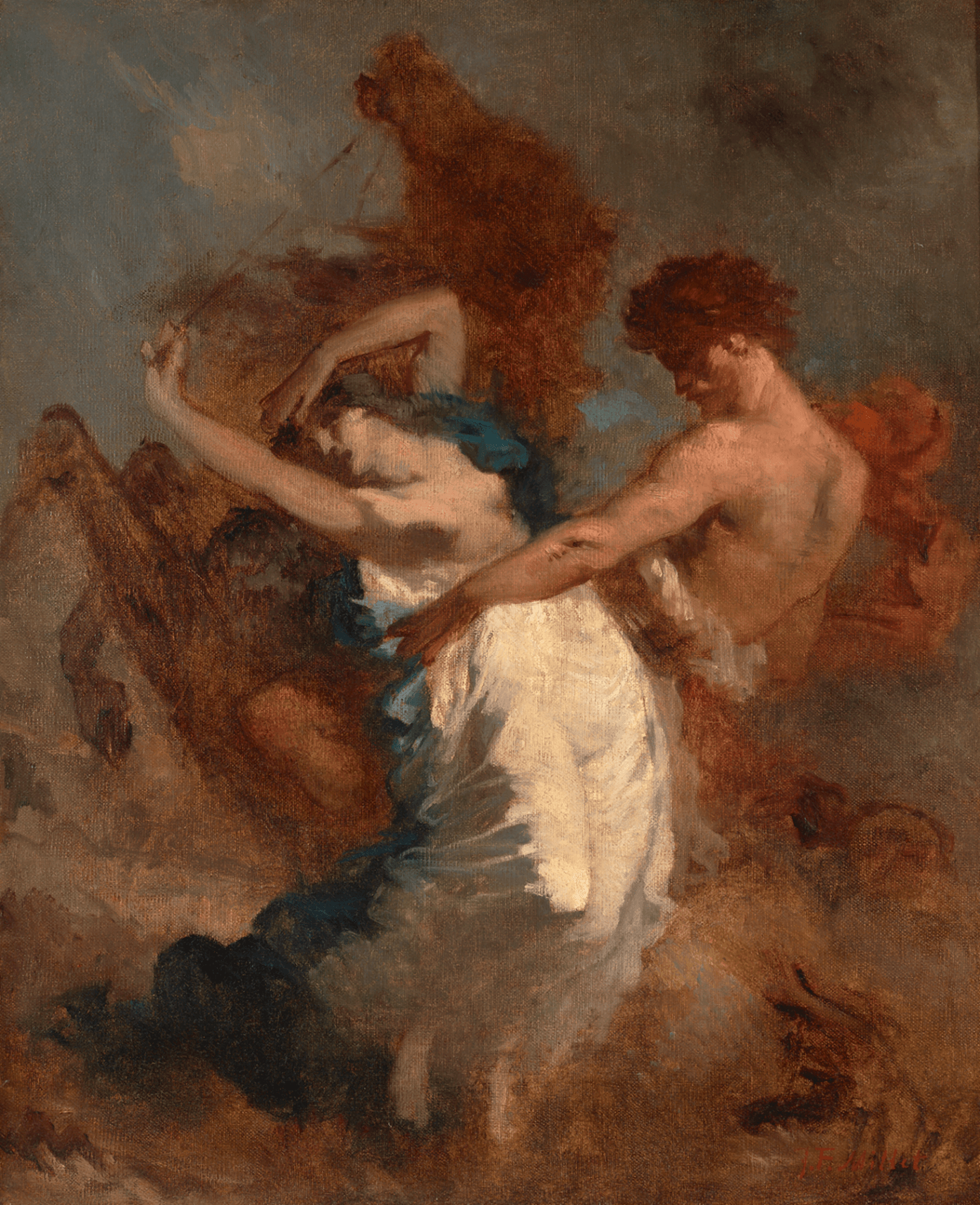
The Abduction of the Sabine Women by Jean-François Millet, c.1844–1847

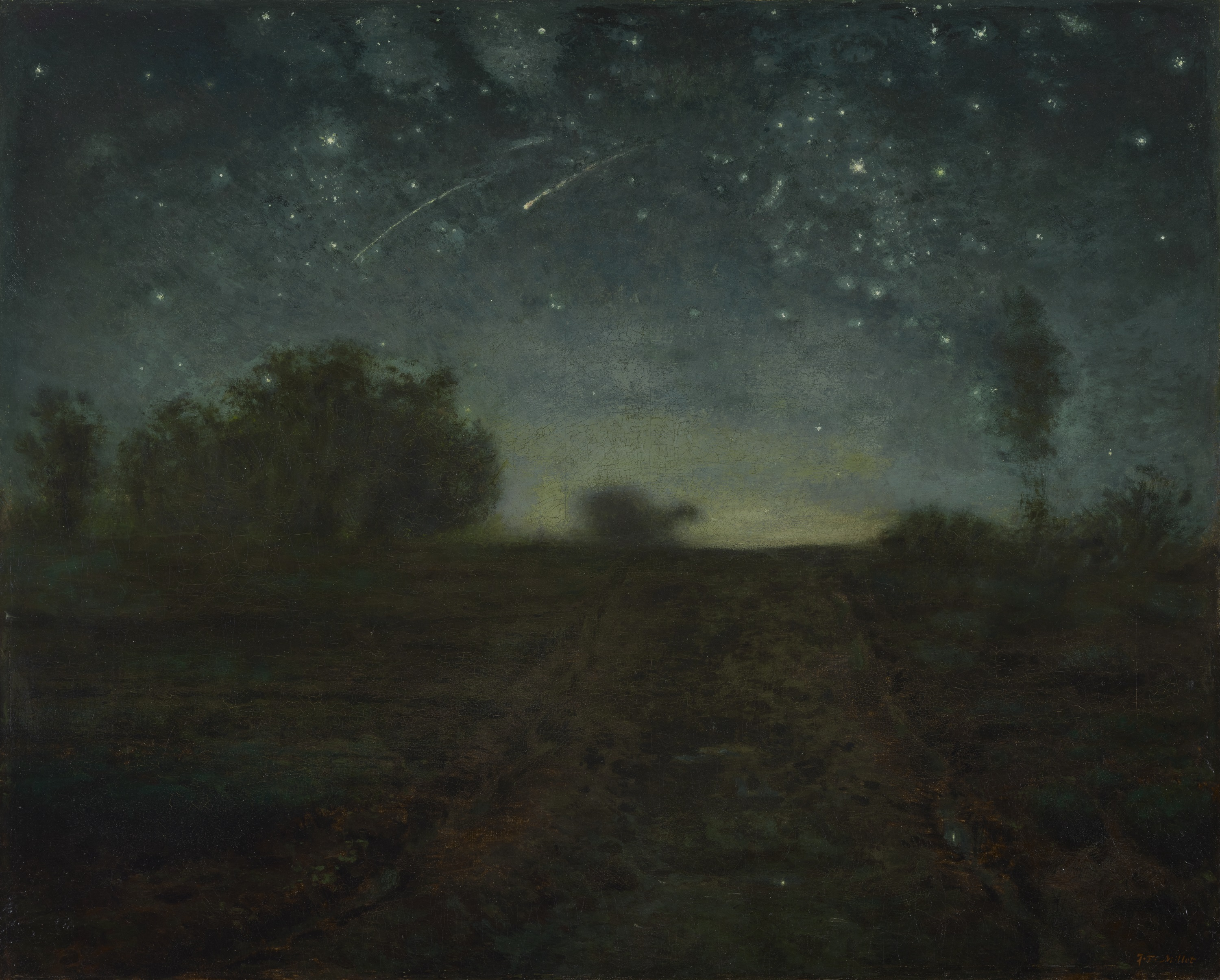
Starry Night, c. 1850–1865, Yale University Art Gallery

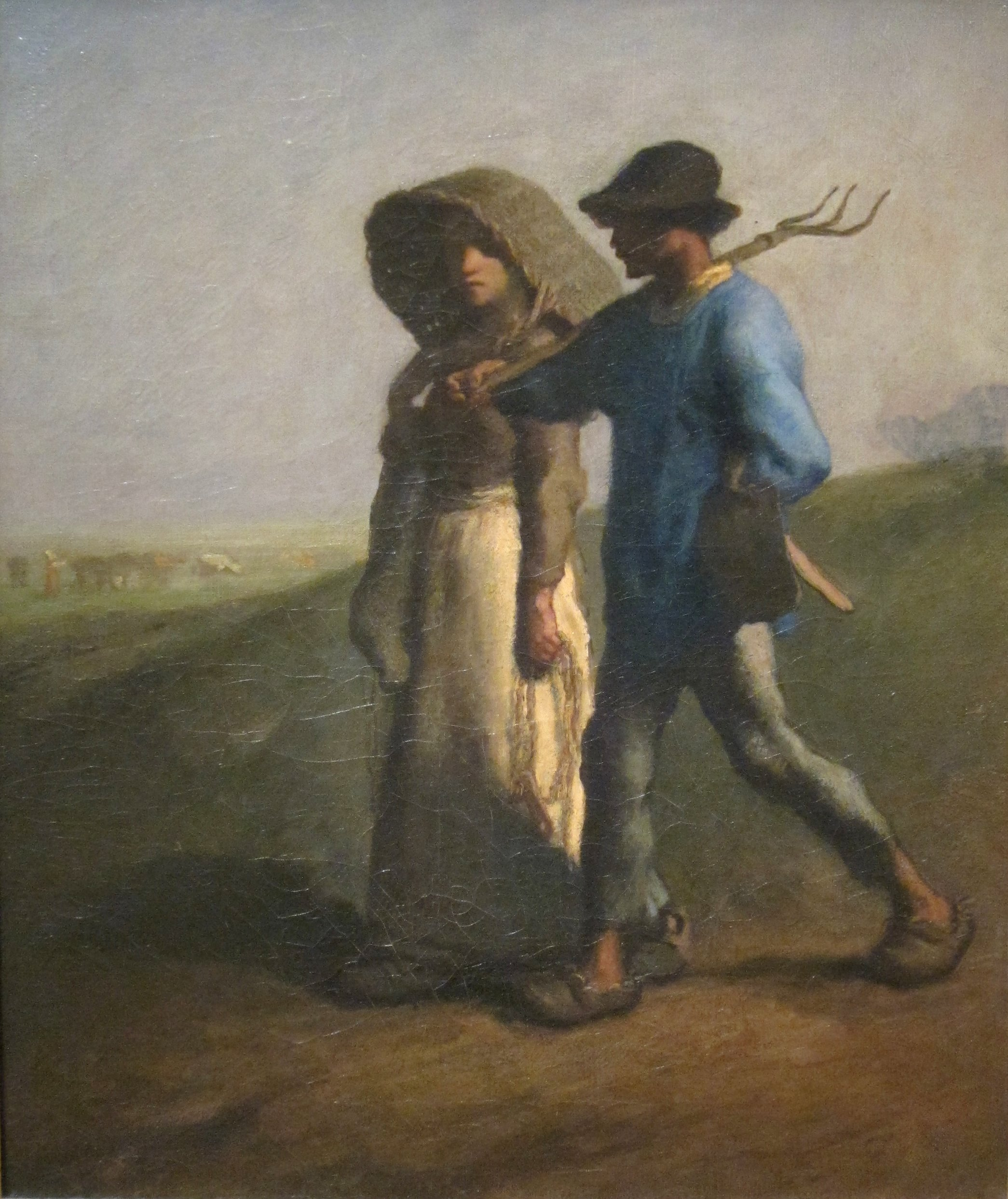
Going to Work, 1851–1853

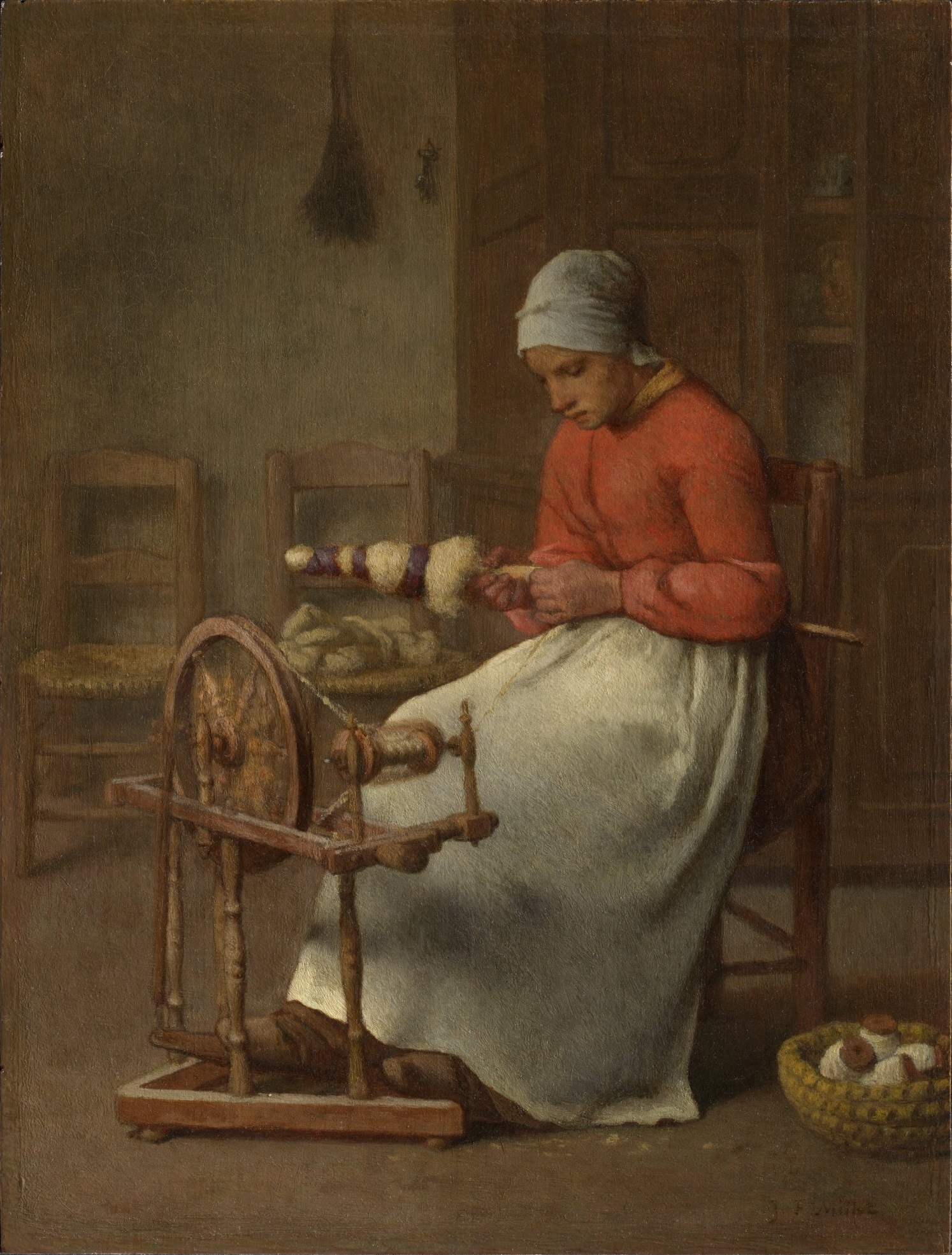
Woman Spinning (The Spinning Wheel), c. 1855–1860. Clark Art Institute

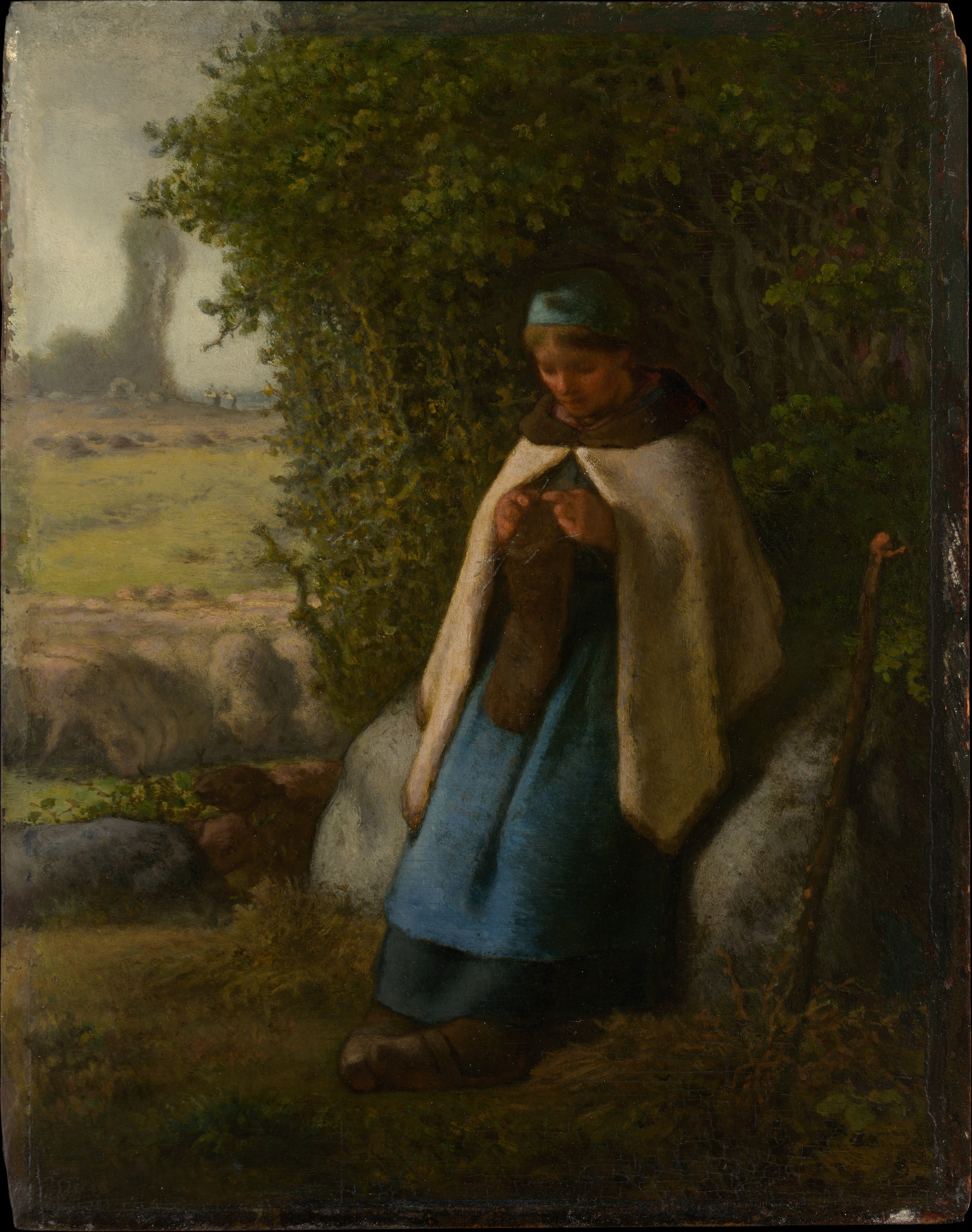
Shepherdess Seated on a Rock, 1856

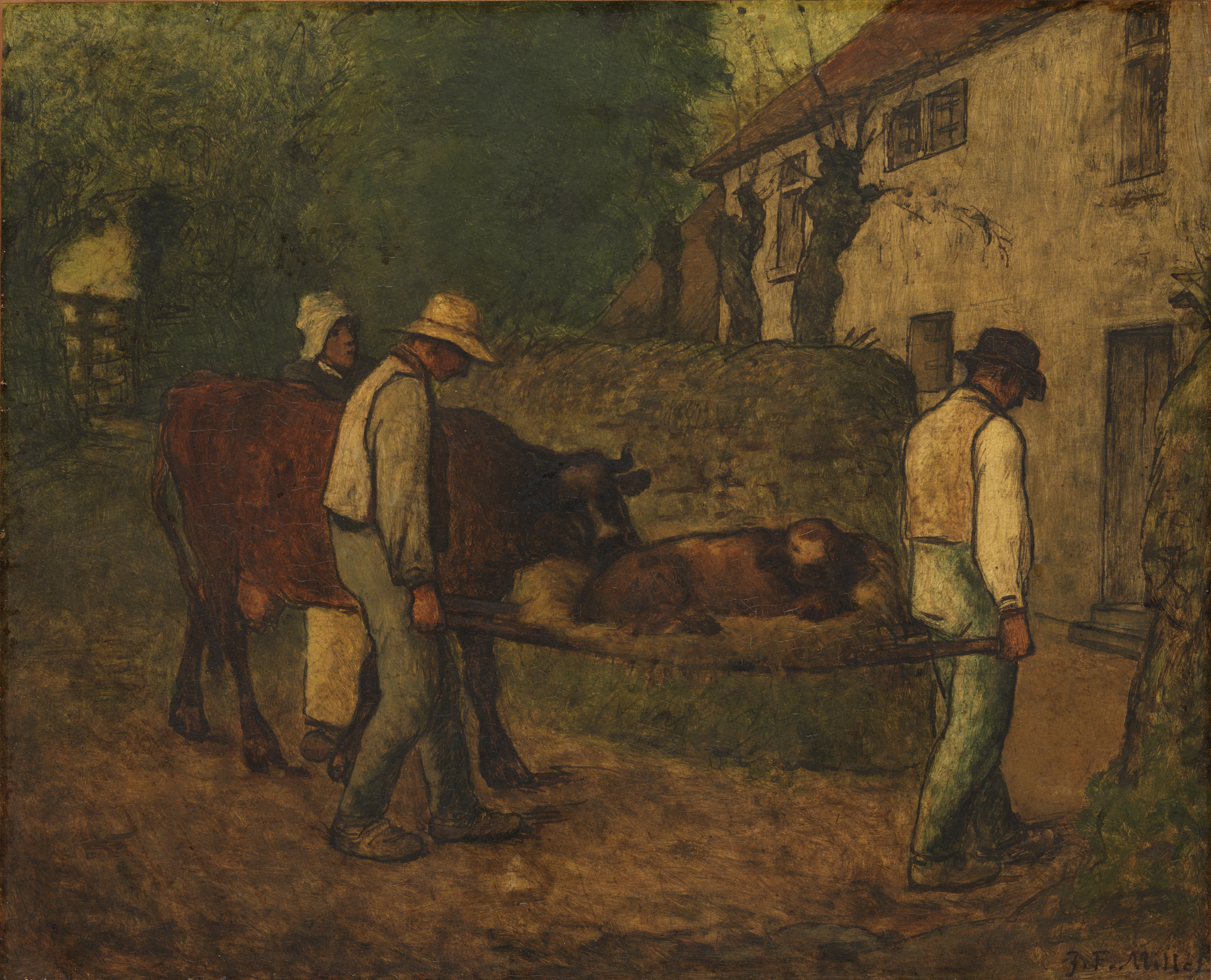
Bringing home the calf born in the fields, c. 1860, Princeton University Art Museum

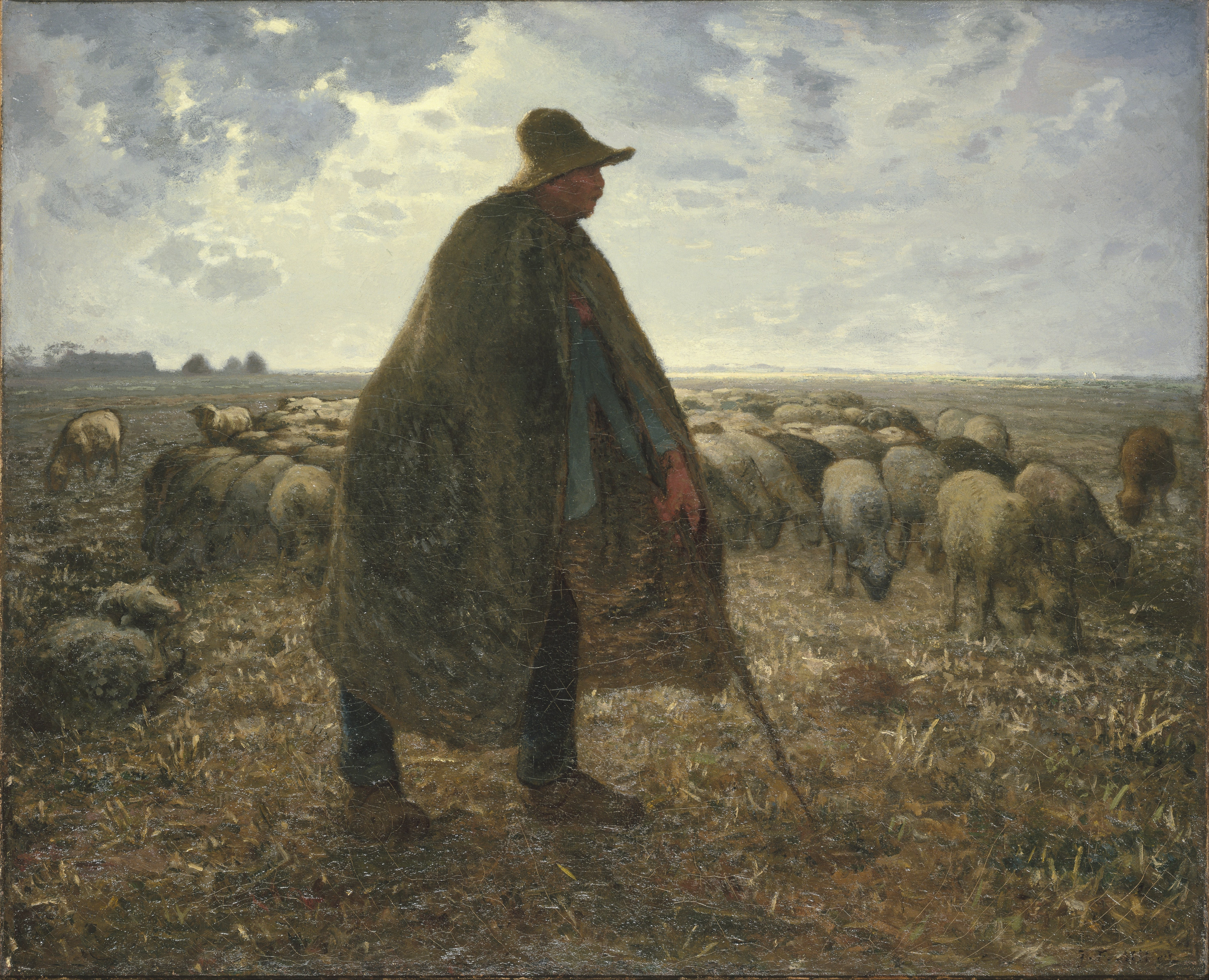
Shepherd Tending His Flock, early 1860s

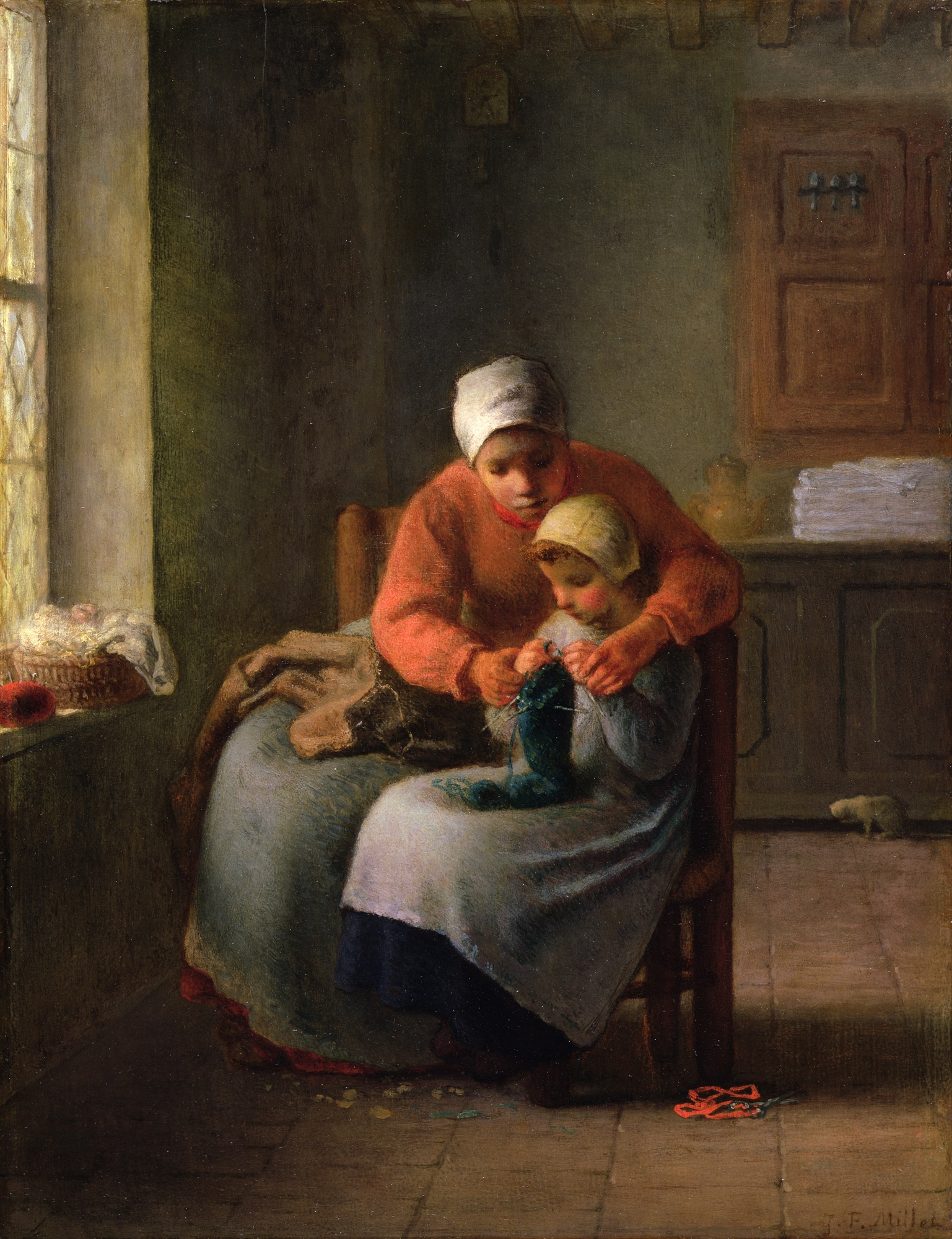
The Knitting Lesson, c. 1860. Clark Art Institute

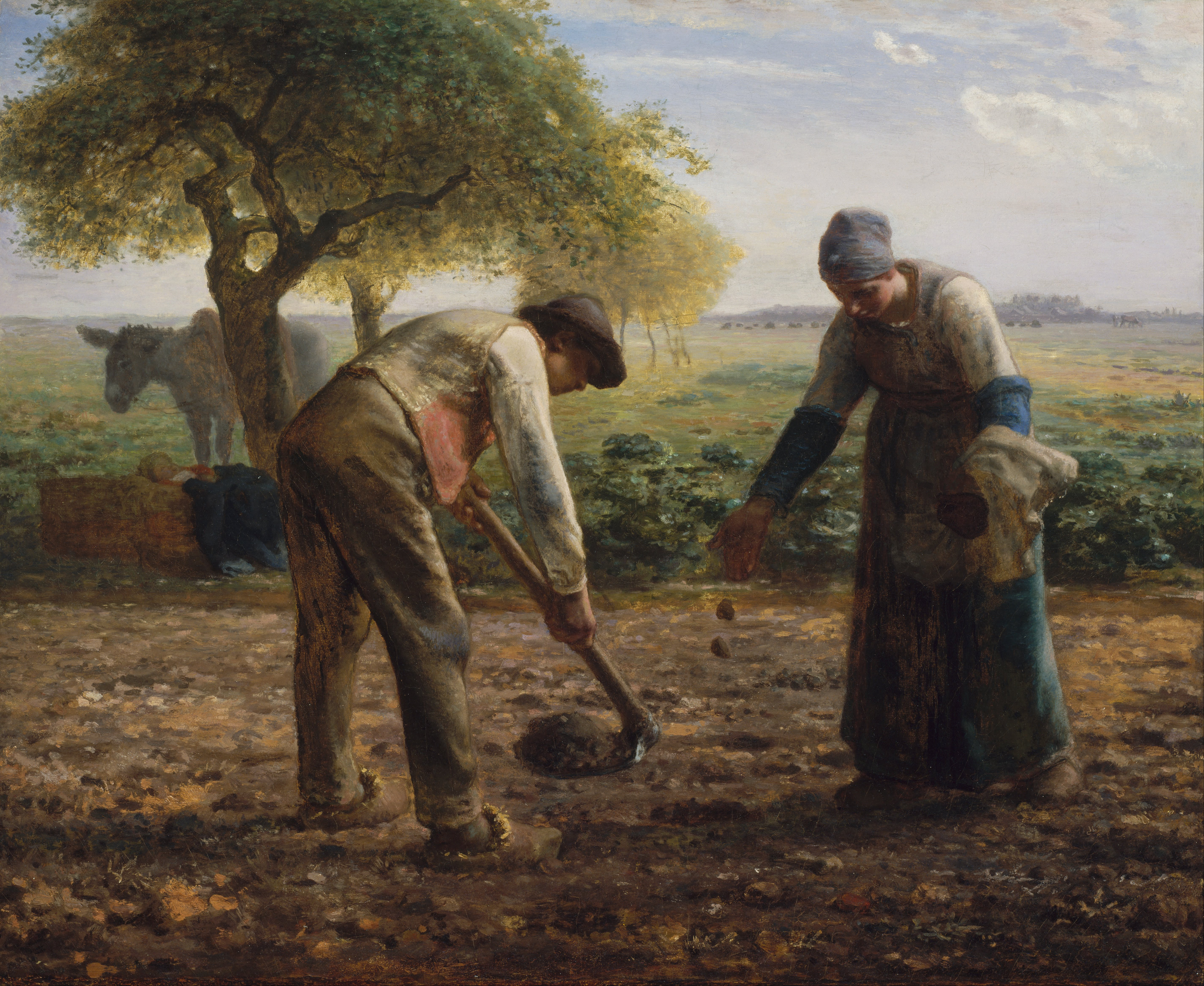
Potato Planters, 1861

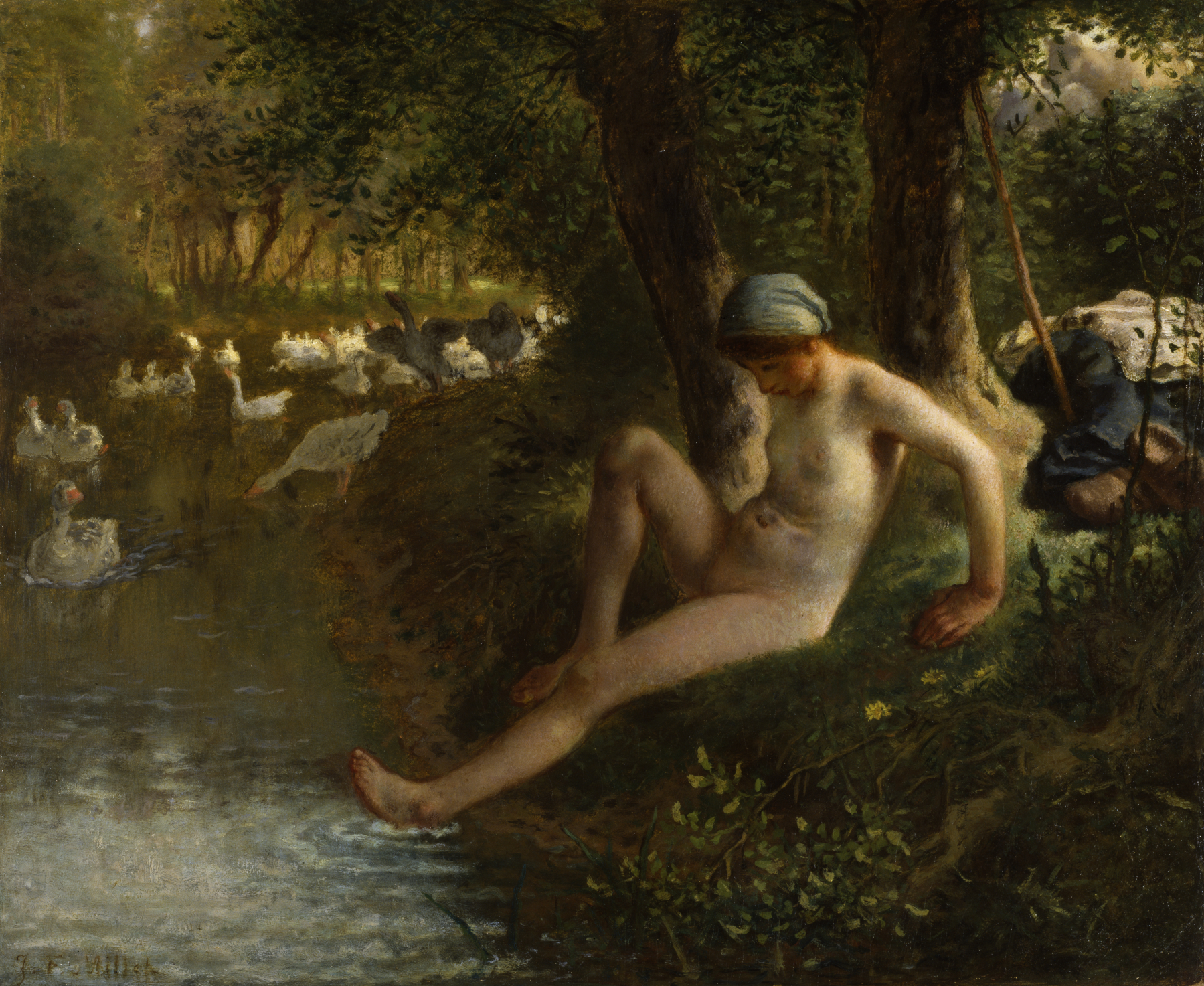
The Goose Girl, 1863

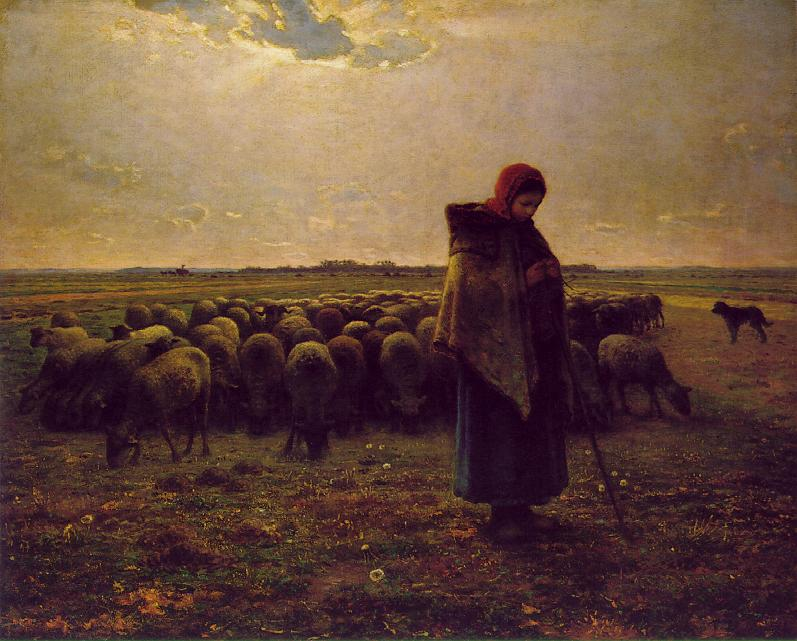
Shepherdess with her Flock, 1864

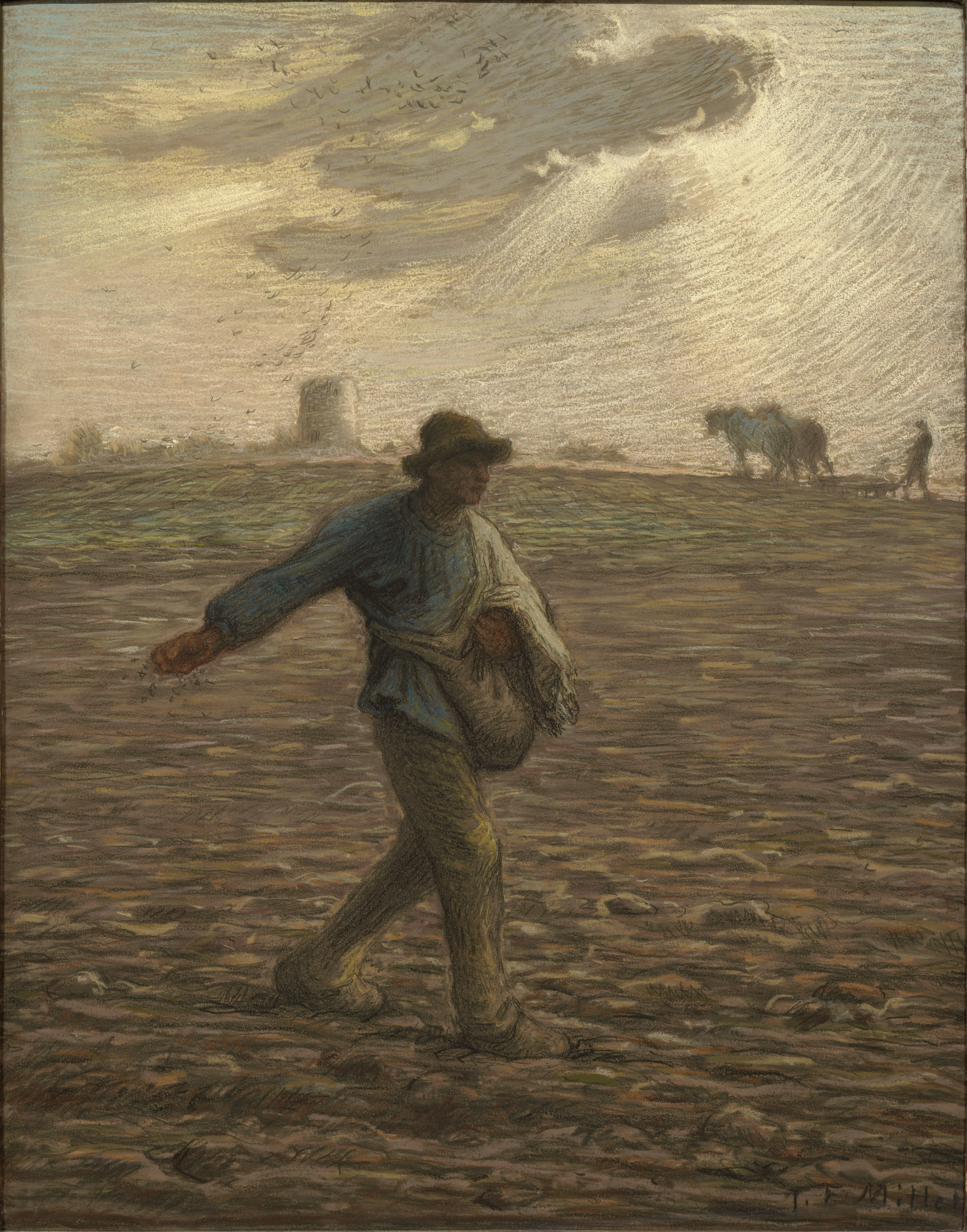
The Sower, c. 1865. Clark Art Institute

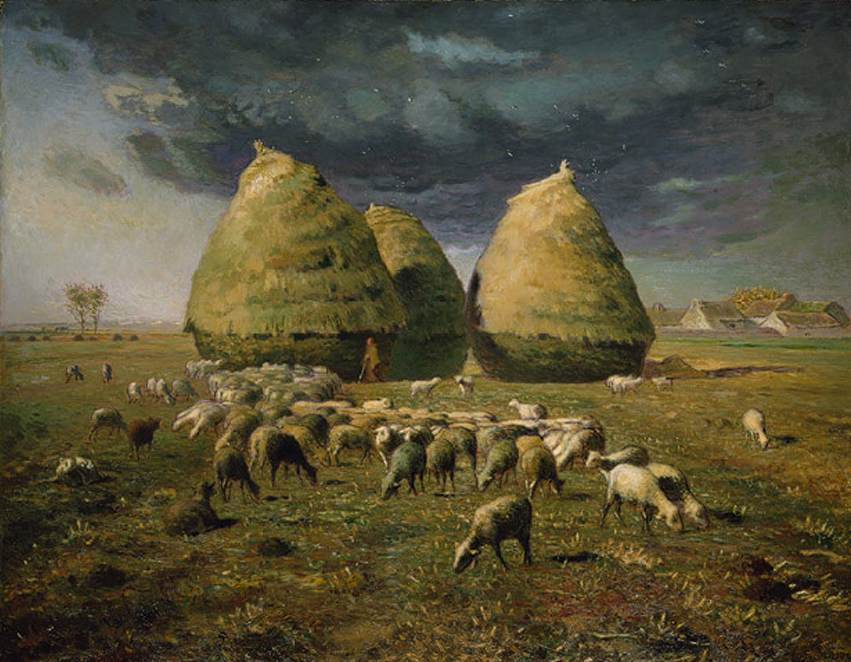
Haystacks: Autumn, c. 1874, oil on canvas, Metropolitan Museum of Art

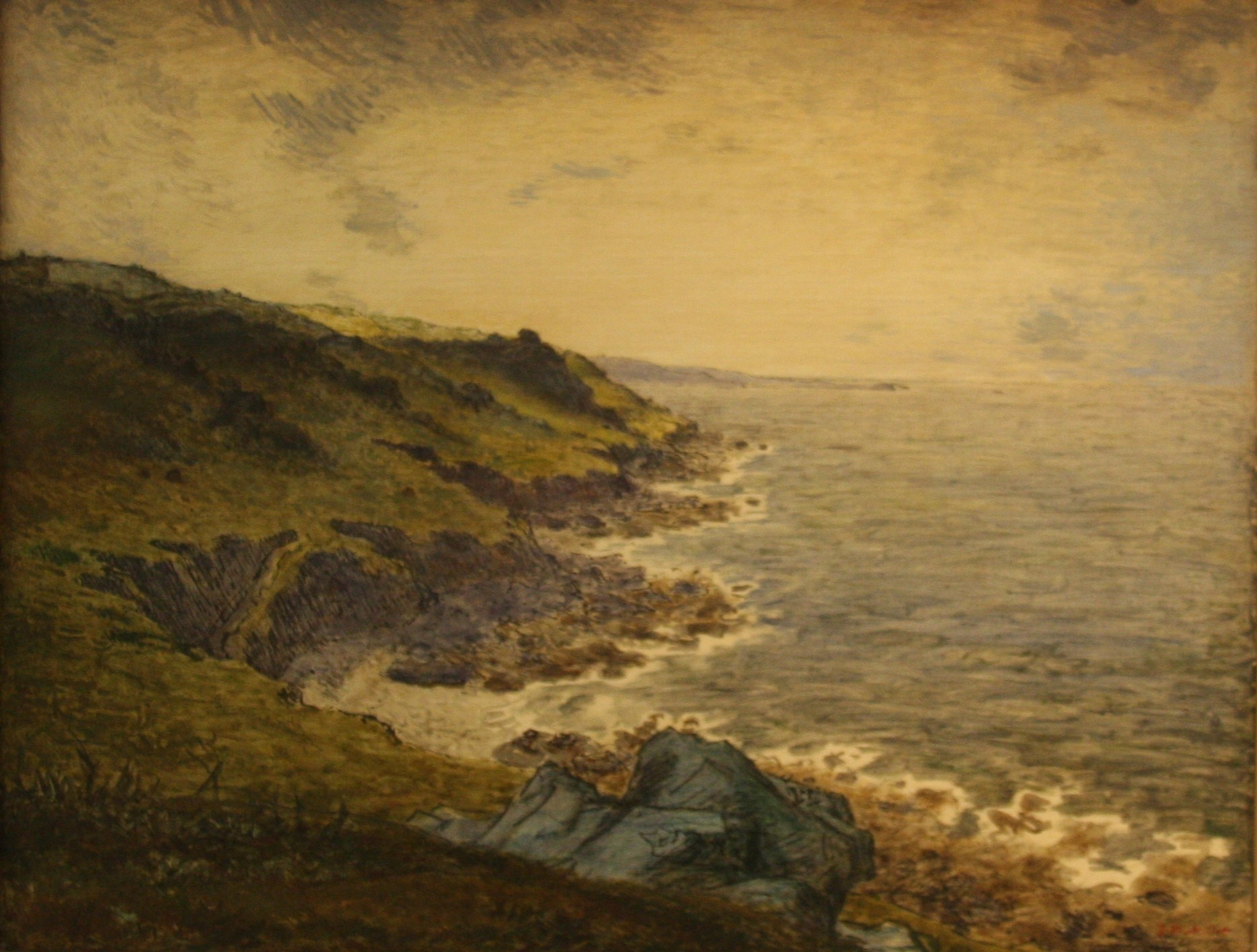
The Coast of Gréville, undated National Museum, Stockholm

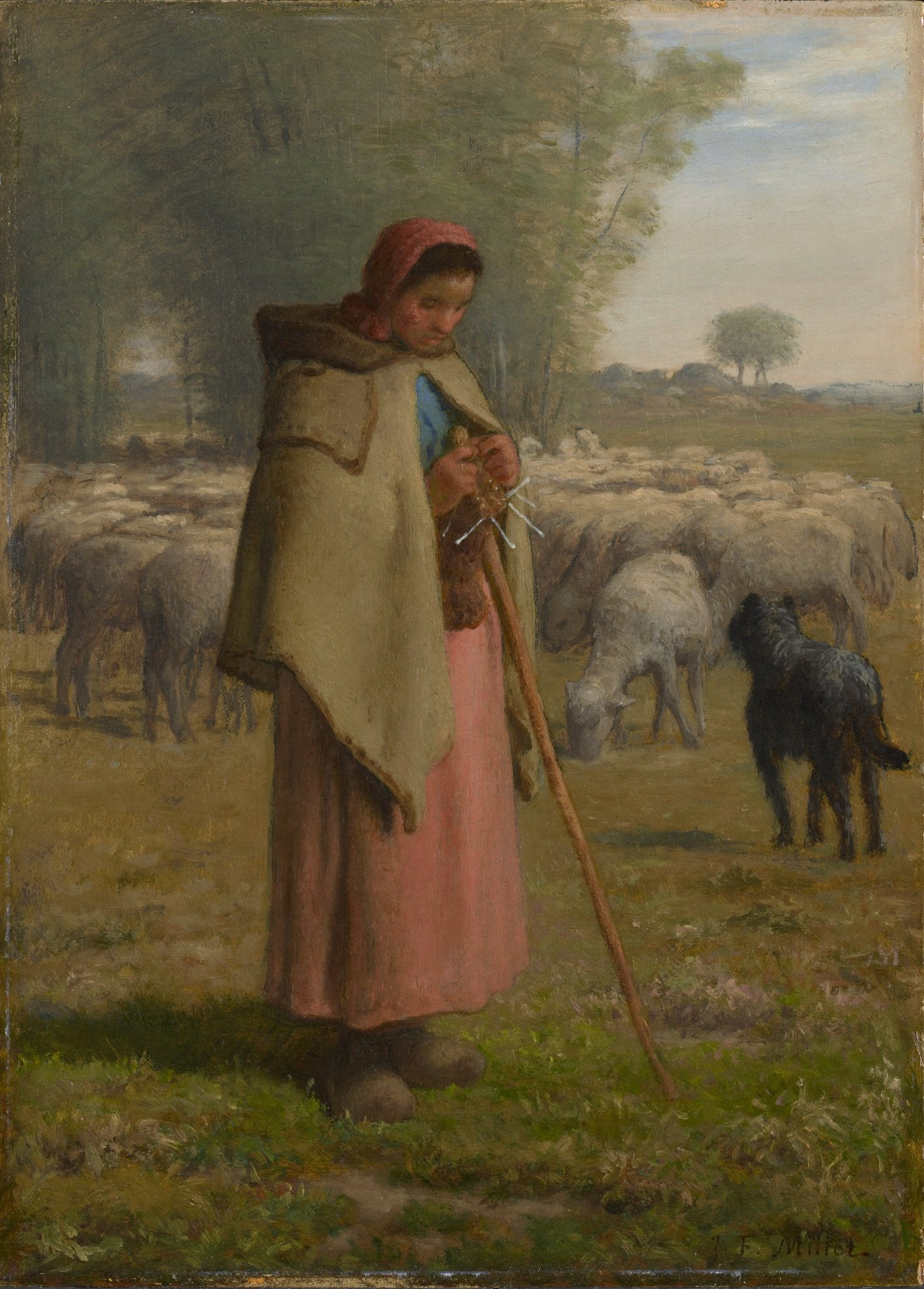
Young Girl Guarding her Sheep, c. 1860–1862. Clark Art Institute
