= Haystacks: Autumn =

Painting by Jean-François Millet

- Meules de foin, automne (French)
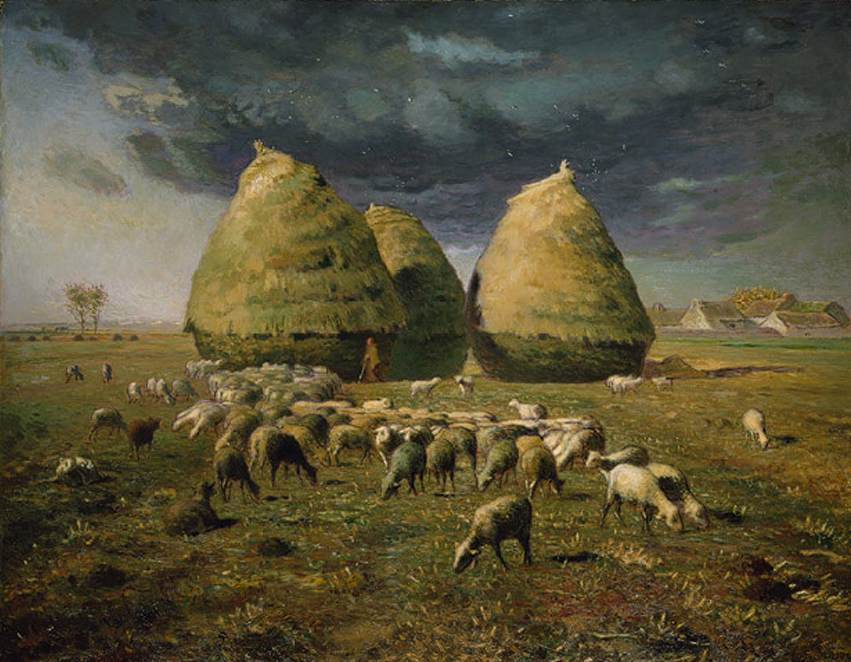
- Artist: Jean-François Millet
- Year: c. 1874
- Medium: Oil on canvas
- Dimensions: 85.1 cm × 110.2 cm (33.5 in × 43.4 in)
- Location: Metropolitan Museum of Art; New York

Haystacks: Autumn is a c. 1874 painting by French artist Jean-François Millet. Done in oil on canvas, the work depicts a group of haystacks in a French field. The painting is one of a series of four paintings, one for each season, that Millet painted on commission for a French industrialist. The work is in the collection of the Metropolitan Museum of Art, in New York.
