= The Potato Harvest =

Painting by Jean-François Millet

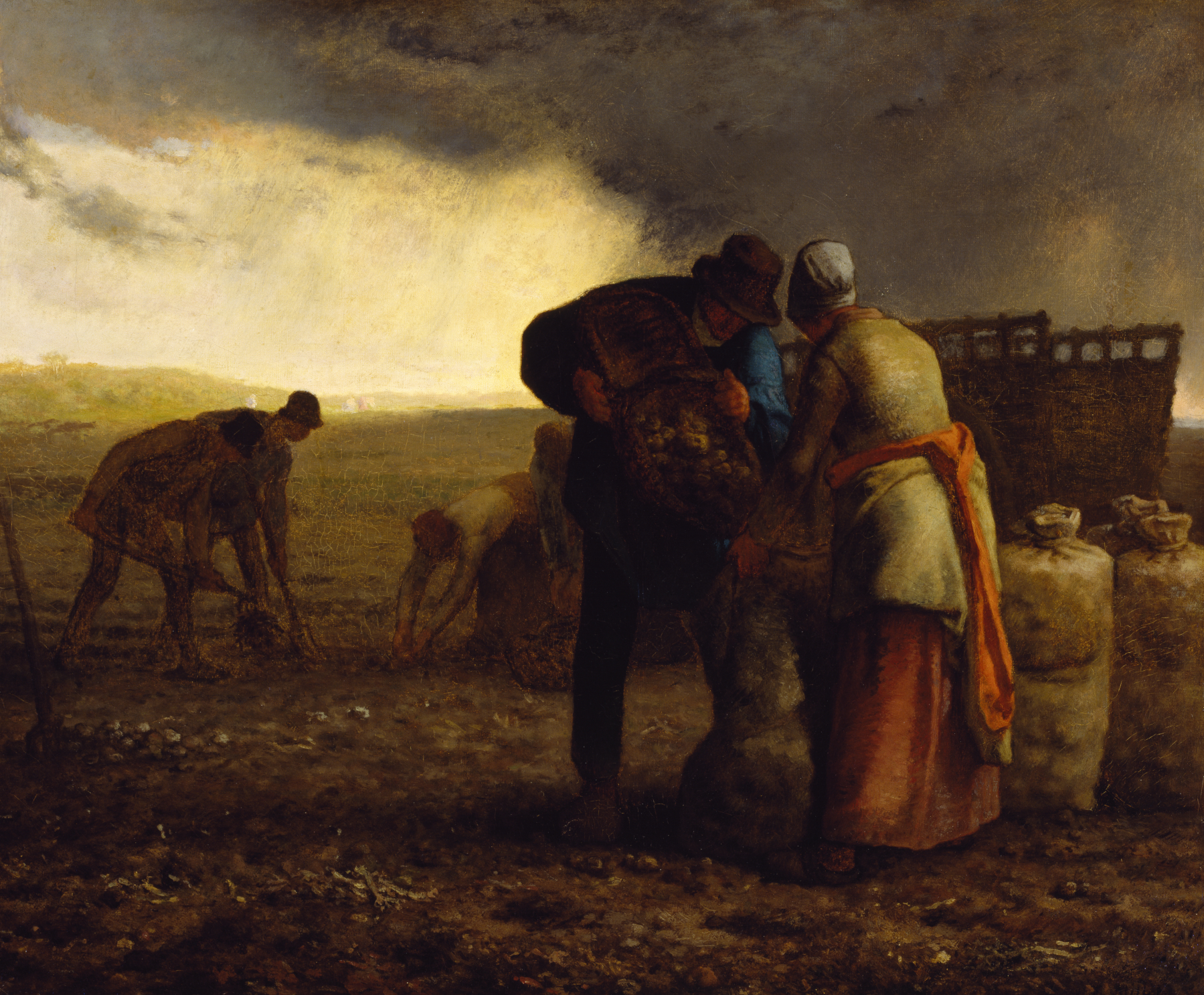
- Artist: Jean-François Millet
- Year: 1855
- Medium: Oil on canvas
- Dimensions: 54 cm × 65.2 cm (21 in × 25.7 in)
- Location: The Walters Art Museum; Baltimore

The Potato Harvest is an oil-on-canvas painting by the French artist Jean-François Millet, created in 1855. It is held at The Walters Art Museum, in Baltimore.

== History ==
Jean-François Millet was raised in the area of France known as the old province of Normandy. He was brought up with hard out-of-door labor. After studying to become a painter, he devoted his art to illustrating peasants farming the land. His subjects were often taken from his surroundings or from memories from his youth.

During the 1850s, Millet began incorporating his subjects into landscapes. The Potato Harvest is one of nine works which drew international acclaim at the Exposition Universelle in 1867.

== Composition ==
The Potato Harvest depicts peasants working in the plains between Barbizon and Chailly. It presents a theme representative of the peasants' struggle for survival. Millet's technique for this work incorporated paste-like pigments thickly applied over a coarsely textured canvas.
