= Barbizon =

- Commune
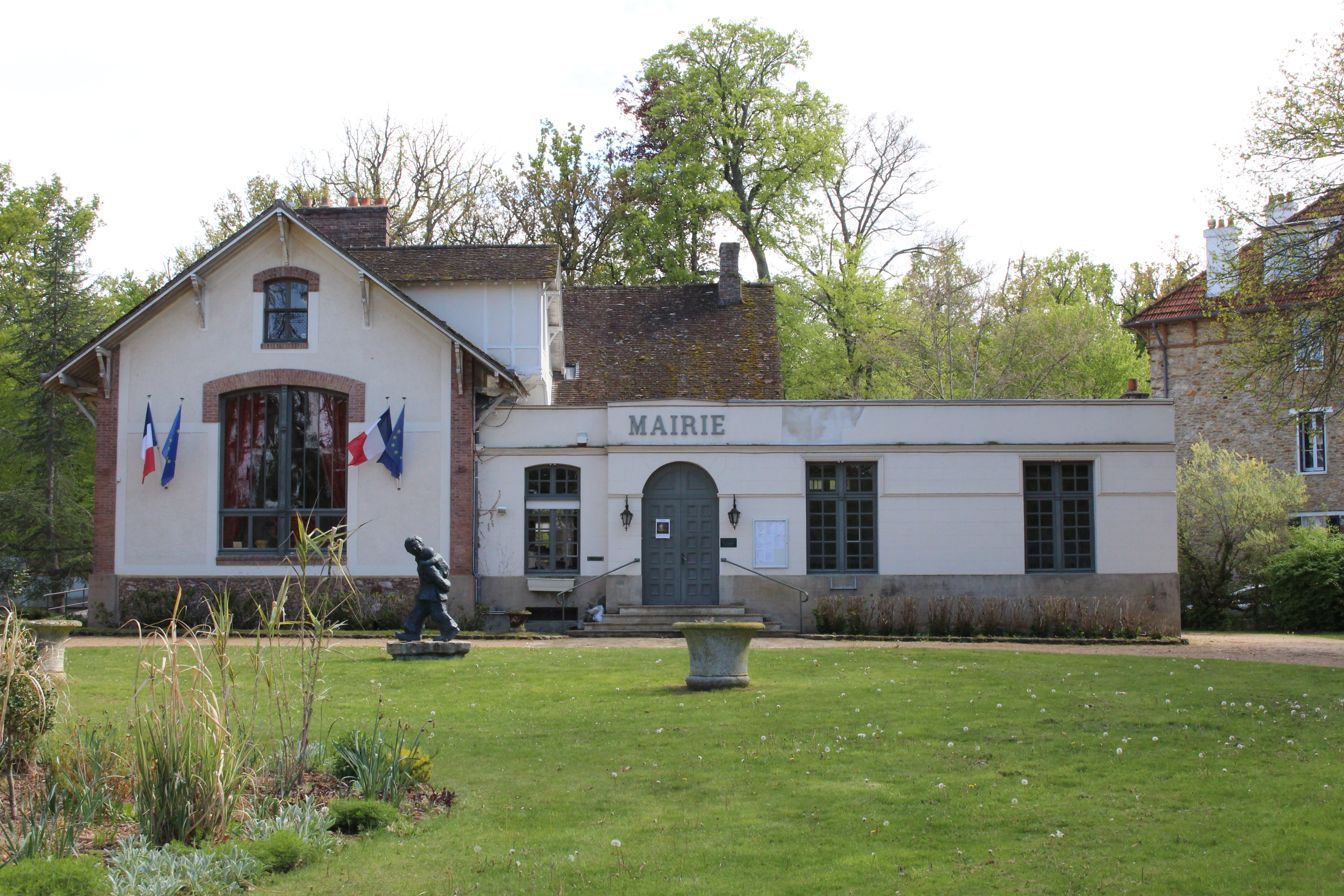
- The town hall in Barbizon

- Coat of arms
- Location of Barbizon
- Location within France Location within Île-de-France (region)
- Coordinates: 48°26′48″N 2°36′20″E
- Country: France
- Region: Île-de-France
- Department: Seine-et-Marne
- Arrondissement: Fontainebleau
- Canton: Fontainebleau
- Intercommunality: CA Pays de Fontainebleau

Government
  - Mayor (2020–2026): Gerard Taponat
- Area^{1}: 5.27 km^{2} (2.03 sq mi)
- Highest elevation: 93 m (305 ft)
- Lowest elevation: 75 m (246 ft)
- Population (2023): 1,261
  - Density: 239/km^{2} (620/sq mi)
- Time zone: UTC+01:00 (CET)
  - Summer (DST): UTC+02:00 (CEST)
- INSEE/Postal code: 77022 /77630
- ^{1} French Land Register data, which excludes lakes, ponds, glaciers > 1 km^{2} (0.386 sq mi or 247 acres) and river estuaries.

Barbizon (French pronunciation: [baʁbizɔ̃]) is a commune (town) in the Seine-et-Marne department in north-central France. It is located near the Fontainebleau Forest.

== Demographics ==
The inhabitants are called Barbizonais.

== Art history ==
The Barbizon school of painters is named after the village; Théodore Rousseau and Jean-François Millet, leaders of the school, made their homes and died in the village. Leon Trotsky also lived here for a short time.

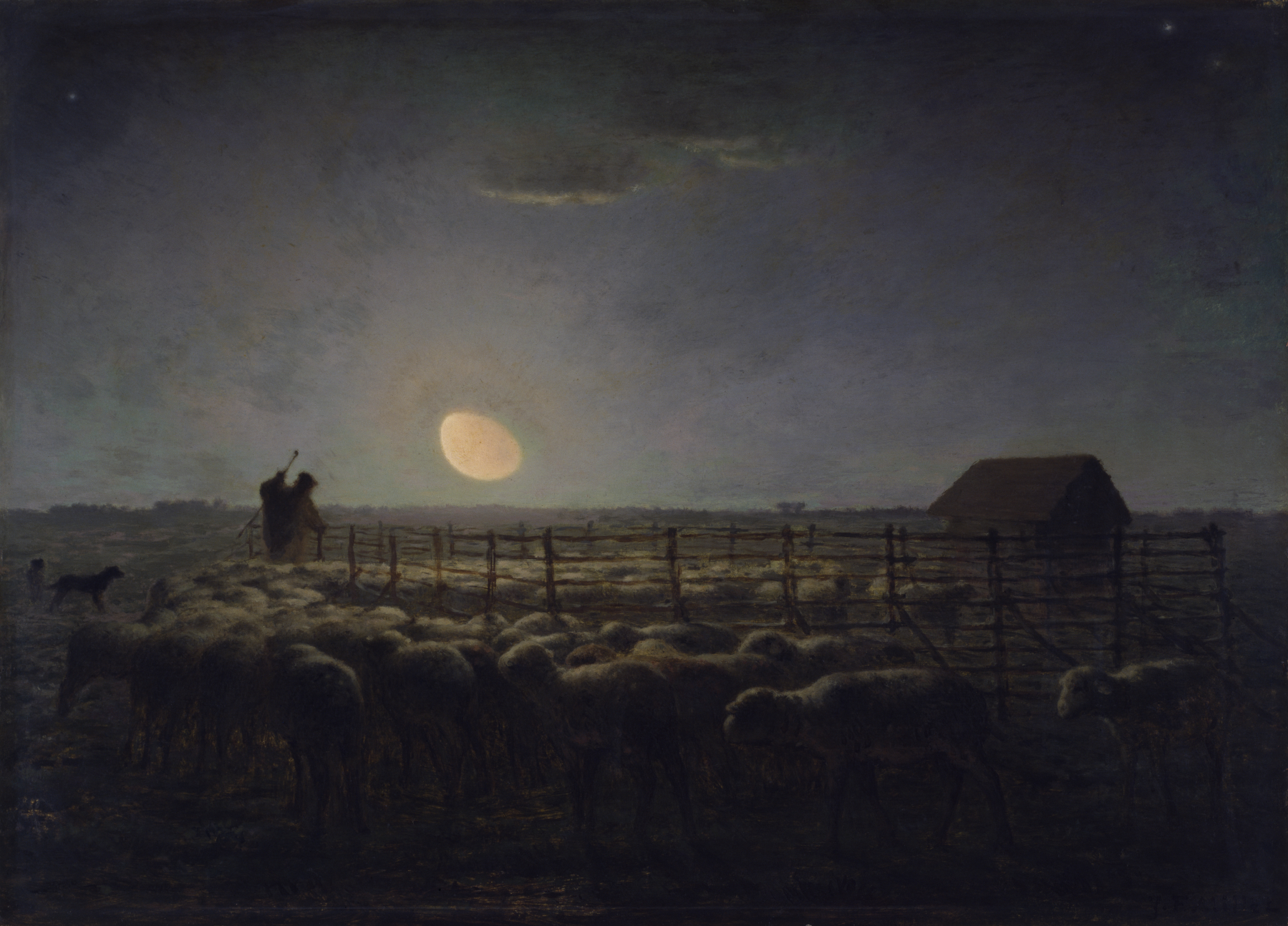
The Sheepfold, Moonlight by Jean-François Millet. The Walters Art Museum.

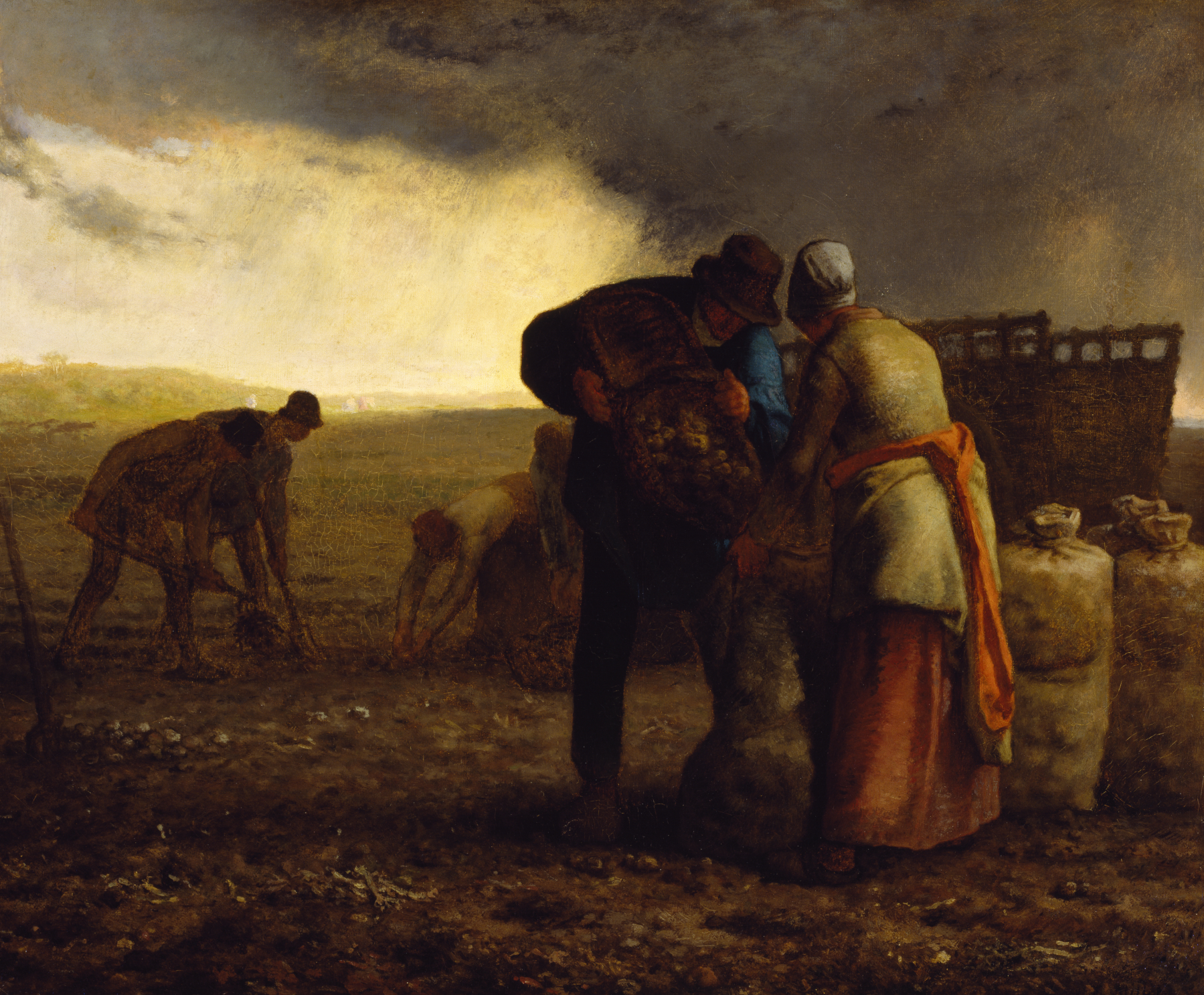
The Potato Harvest by Jean-François Millet. The Walters Art Museum.

== International relations ==
=== Twin towns ===
- East Bergholt, England
- Szentendre, Hungary

=== Friendship cities ===
- Asago, Hyōgo Prefecture, Japan

== See also ==
- Communes of the Seine-et-Marne department
- List of works by Henri Chapu
