= Shepherdess with her Flock =

Painting by Jean-François Millet

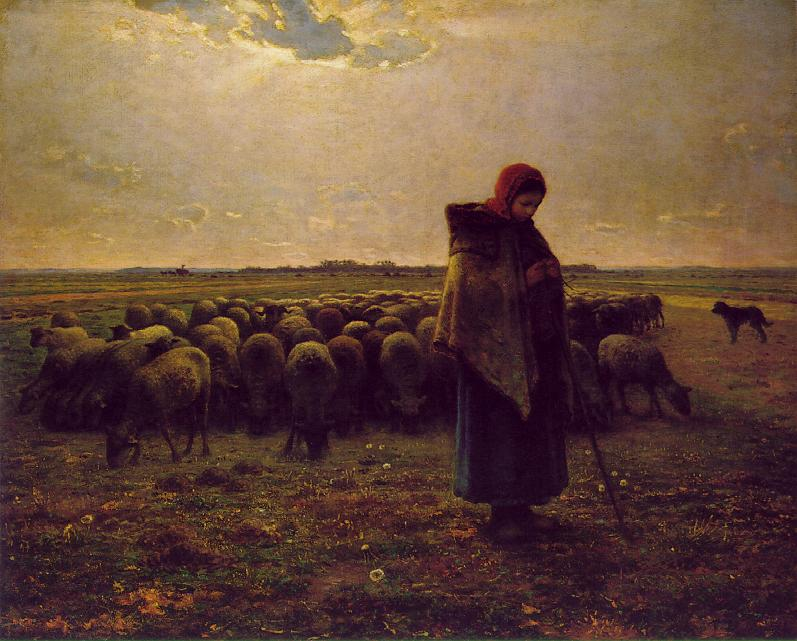
- Artist: Jean-François Millet
- Year: c. 1863
- Type: oil on canvas
- Dimensions: 81 cm × 101 cm (32 in × 40 in)
- Location: Musee d'Orsay, Paris

Shepherdess with her Flock is an oil-on-canvas painting by Jean-François Millet, created c. 1863. It is held in the Musee d'Orsay, in Paris.

== History ==
Millet expressed a desire to paint a work showing a shepherdess with her flock as early as 1862. As his friend Alfred Sensier related, this theme "obsessed the artist's mind" until he exhibited the work at the Paris Salon of 1864, where it was a great success, called a "refined canvas" by some and a "masterpiece" by others. It was particularly esteemed by the middle-classes in Paris, who preferred idealised paintings of rural life to caring about the hard life of real peasants.

== Description ==
The oil painting is characterized by feelings of calm and harmony. The scene is admirably accurate and melancholic. Millet in this work deepens and re-examines the backlight, anticipating by almost a decade what will be the future directions of impressionism. At the center of the composition, but slightly shifted to the right, there is a young shepherdess standing quietly (perhaps the model used was the painter's own daughter), intent on working the wool with the needles. The girl, portrayed in three-quarters, wears very modest clothing, including a woolen hat and a red hood.

Behind the girl, there is the flock of sheep, who is placidly grazing the grass of the meadow, dotted with various colorful flowers. A black hound is watching over them, at the far right of the painting. The dog acts almost as a compositional counterweight to the compact mass of the sheep, like an unexpected and lively element in front of the perfect horizontal symmetry of the flock. Looking towards the horizon, however, the viewer sees a monotonous and repetitive landscape, punctuated by various paths and trails that, with their polychromy, contribute to delineate an ideal vanishing point, thanks to which the painting acquires a lively and pulsating depth.

The upper portion of the canvas is occupied by a livid sky, furrowed by a mass of clouds that, obscuring the sun, contribute to flood the scene with a diffuse and golden luminosity. In addition to the refined chromatic texture, played on the agreements of blue, red and gold, the painting stands out for the richness of the luministic texture, dense and enveloping. The viewer is in fact in the presence of a blinding backlight, which gets stuck and lingers on several details, from the shepherdess' blouse to the undergrowth of the fields. The woolly backs of the sheep deserve special mention, as they shine more than anything else in the golden glow of the sunset.

== Provenance ==
The state attempted to purchase the work, after its first exhibition, but Millet, however, preferred to sell it to the collector Paul Tesse. After various wanderings, the Shepherdess with her Flock, among other paintings by the artist, became part of the collections of the Louvre, thanks to the legacy of Alfred Chauchard, in 1909. The work was finally moved to the Musée d'Orsay, also in Paris, in 1986.
