= List of people from Wyoming =

State flag of Wyoming

Location of Wyoming in the United States

This is a list of prominent people who were born in or lived for a significant period of time in U.S. state of Wyoming.

== The arts ==
=== Acting ===
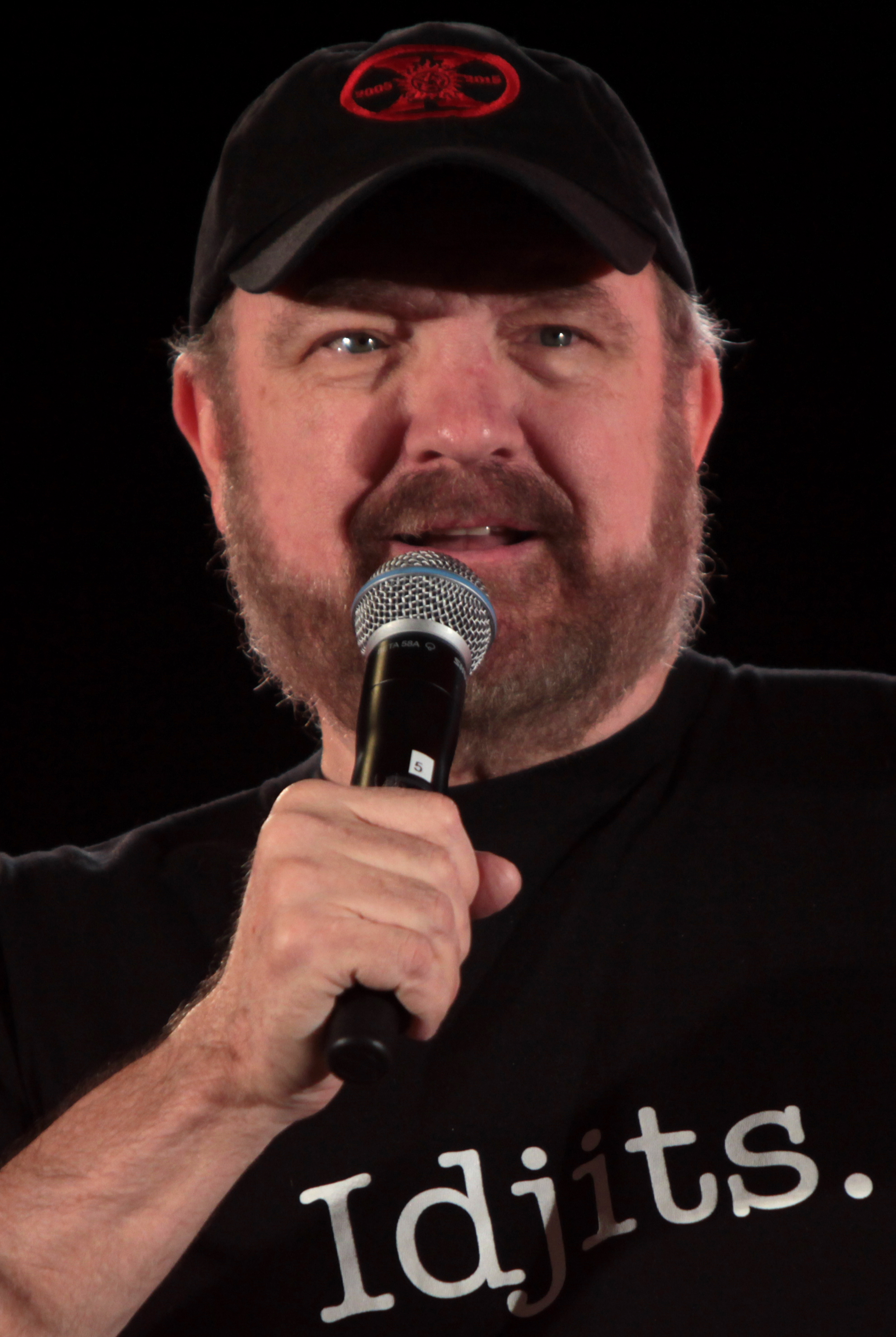
Jim Beaver

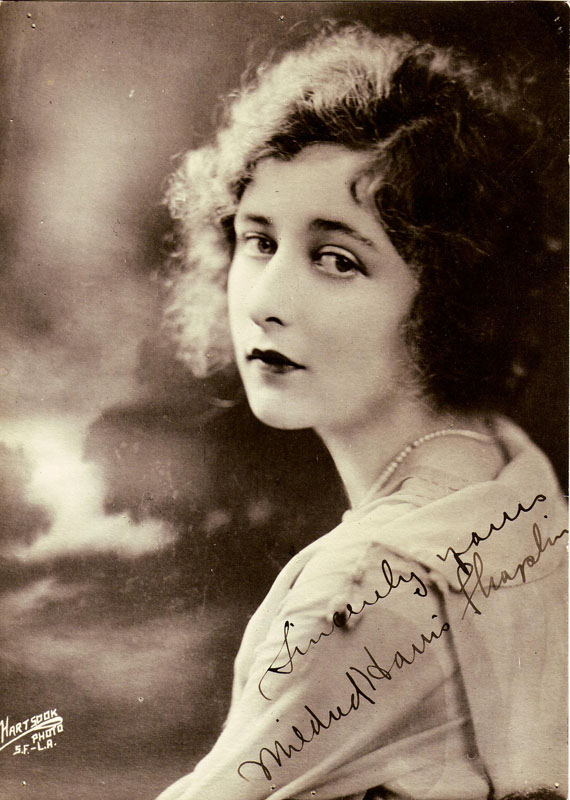
Mildred Harris

- Burnu Acquanetta (1921–2004), actress and model; born in Cheyenne
- Jim Beaver (born 1950), actor; born in Laramie
- Jim J. Bullock (born 1955), actor; born in Casper
- Darren Dalton (born 1965), actor; born in Powell
- Mickey Daniels (1914–1970), actor; born in Rock Springs
- Matthew Fox (born 1966), actor; raised in Crowheart
- Jesse Garcia (born 1982), actor; born in Rawlins
- Mildred Harris (1901–1944), actress; born in Cheyenne
- Cecilia Hart (1948–2016), actress; born in Cheyenne
- Kirby Heyborne (born 1976), actor; born in Evanston
- Isabel Jewell (1907–1972), actress; born in Shoshoni
- Michael Pearlman (born 1972), actor; lives in Jackson
- Jim Siedow (1920–2003), actor; born in Cheyenne
- Wally Wales (1895–1980), actor; born in Sheridan
- Aaron Wiederspahn (1972), actor/producer; raised in Torrington
- Larry Wilcox (born 1947), actor; raised in Rawlins

=== Literature ===
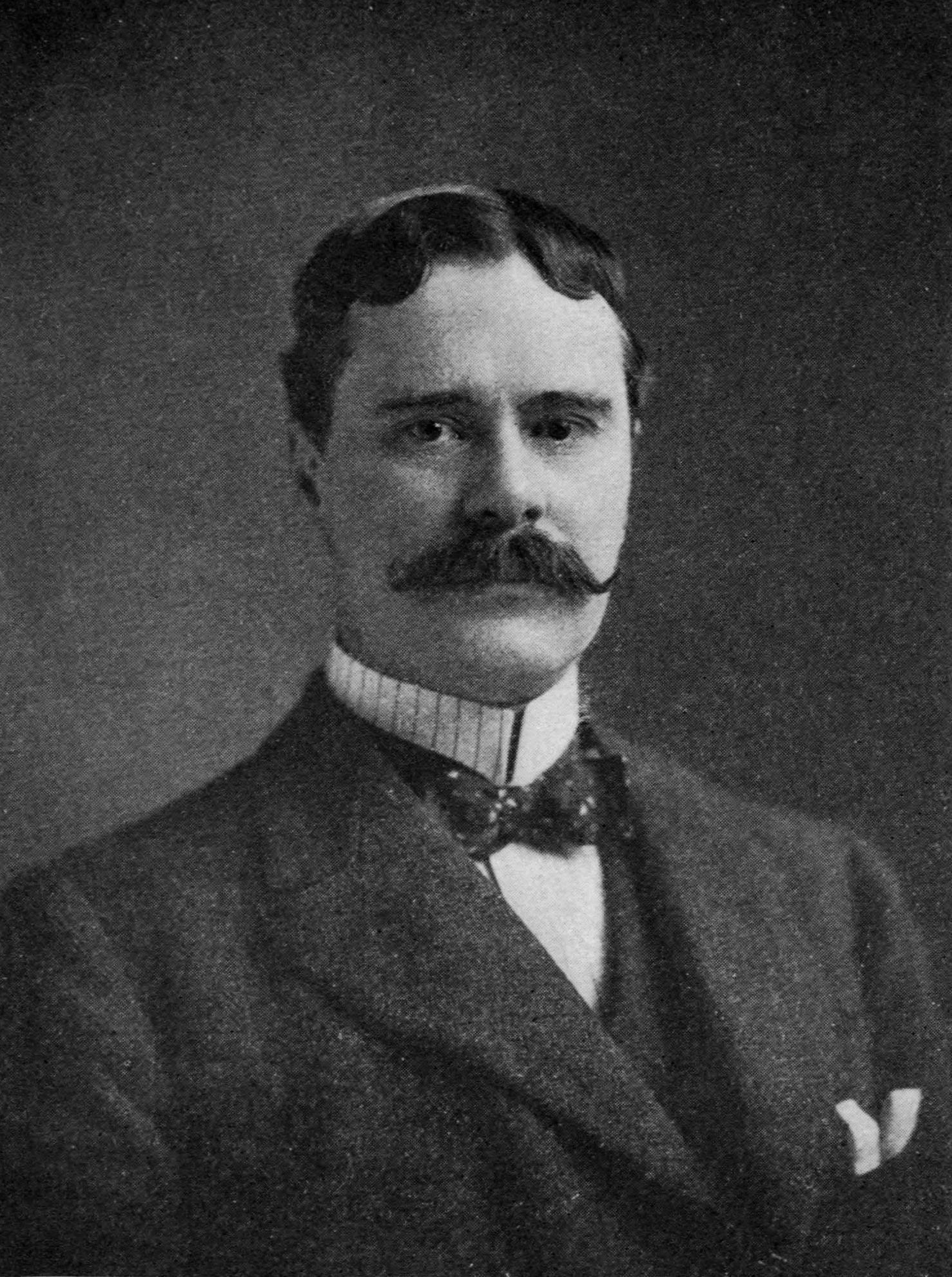
Owen Wister

- Craig Arnold (born 1967), poet; teaches at the University of Wyoming; lives in Laramie
- C. J. Box (born 1958), author of the Joe Pickett series of novels
- Maxwell Struthers Burt (1882–1954), novelist
- James A. "Jim" Corbett (1933–2001), writer, philosopher, and human-rights activist; born in Casper
- Gretel Ehrlich (born 1946), novelist
- Joe Clifford Faust (born 1957), novelist
- Alexandra Fuller (born 1969), writer, author of Don't Let's Go to the Dogs Tonight; lives in Jackson Hole
- Kathleen O'Neal Gear (born 1954), writer
- W. Michael Gear (born 1955), writer
- Dan Hausel (born 1949), author of several geology books in Wyoming
- Grace Raymond Hebard (1861–1936), western history writer whose findings regarding Sacajawea and Esther Hobart Morris tend to be challenged by contemporary historians
- Craig A. Johnson (born 1961), author of the Walt Longmire mysteries; lives in Ucross
- George Clayton Johnson (1929–2015), co-author of the novel Logan's Run; born in Cheyenne
- Theodore Judson (born 1951), science-fiction writer
- Patricia MacLachlan (1938–2022), children's book writer; her book Sarah, Plain and Tall won the Newbery Medal; born in Cheyenne
- Rodger McDaniel (born 1948), legislator, attorney, pastor, author of Dying for Joe McCarthy's Sins: The Suicide of Senator Lester Hunt; from Cheyenne
- Kyle Mills (born 1966), writer; lives in Jackson Hole
- Florabel Muir (1889–1970), newspaper reporter and columnist; born in Rock Springs
- Edgar Wilson Nye (1850–1896), journalist and humorist; postmaster of Laramie City in the Wyoming Territory
- Todd Parr (born 1962), children's book writer, artist, children's television show producer; grew up in Rock Springs
- E. Annie Proulx (born 1935), writer; author of the short story "Brokeback Mountain"; lives in Wyoming
- Chip Rawlins (born 1949), non-fiction writer, outdoorsman; lives in Laramie
- Tracy Ringolsby (born 1951), sports writer, born and lives in Cheyenne, fifth generation
- David Romtvedt, Poet Laureate of Wyoming
- Owen Wister (1860–1938), writer of Western novels

=== Music ===
- Scott Avett (born 1976), musician; member of The Avett Brothers; born in Cheyenne
- John Perry Barlow (1947–2018), Grateful Dead lyricist; co-founder of the Electronic Frontier Foundation; retired cattleman; born in Jackson Hole
- Ronnie Bedford (1931–2014), jazz musician; music professor at Northwest College in Powell
- Richard Kermode (1946–1996), keyboardist; played with Janis Joplin, Malo and Santana, born in Lovell
- Chris LeDoux (1948–2005), country music singer-songwriter, bronze sculptor and rodeo champion (professional bareback rider); lived in Kaycee
- Ned LeDoux (born 1977), musician, singer-songwriter, son of Chris LeDoux
- Teenage Bottlerocket, punk rock band from Laramie

=== Television ===
- Curt Gowdy (1919–2006), sportscaster; born in Green River
- Ian James Lee (born 1984), CNN correspondent; born in Lander
- Pete Williams (born 1952), NBC news correspondent; born in Casper

=== Visual arts ===
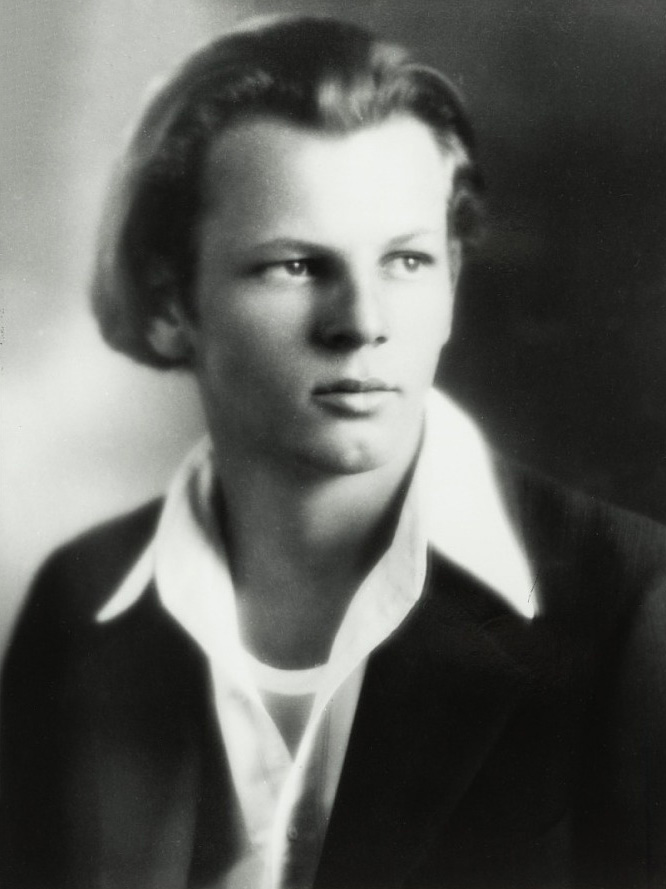
Jackson Pollock

- Earl W. Bascom (1896–1992), painter, sculptor, "Cowboy of Cowboy Artists", "Dean of Rodeo Cowboy Sculpture"; lived in Rock Springs
- Elsa Spear Byron (1896–1992), photographer; born in Big Horn; lived most of her life in Sheridan
- Jackson Pollock (1912–1956), artist; born in Cody
- Floyd Shaman (1935–2005), sculptor; born in Wheatland
- Penny Wolin (born 1953), photographer; author of The Jews of Wyoming: Fringe of the Diaspora and Descendants of Light: American Photographers of Jewish Ancestry; born in Cheyenne

=== Other ===
- Tony Andruzzi (1925–1991), magician; born in Cheyenne
- Robyn Johnson (born 1985), Miss Wyoming USA 2007
- Melba Ogle (born 1942), model; born in Cheyenne
- Lyle Waggoner (1935–2020), actor, sculptor; lives in Jackson

== Politics and public office ==
A–G

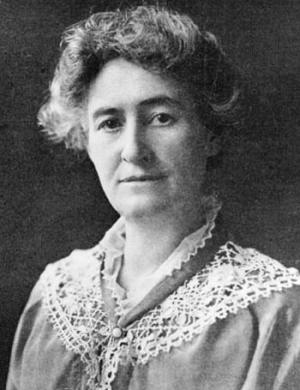
Mary Bellamy

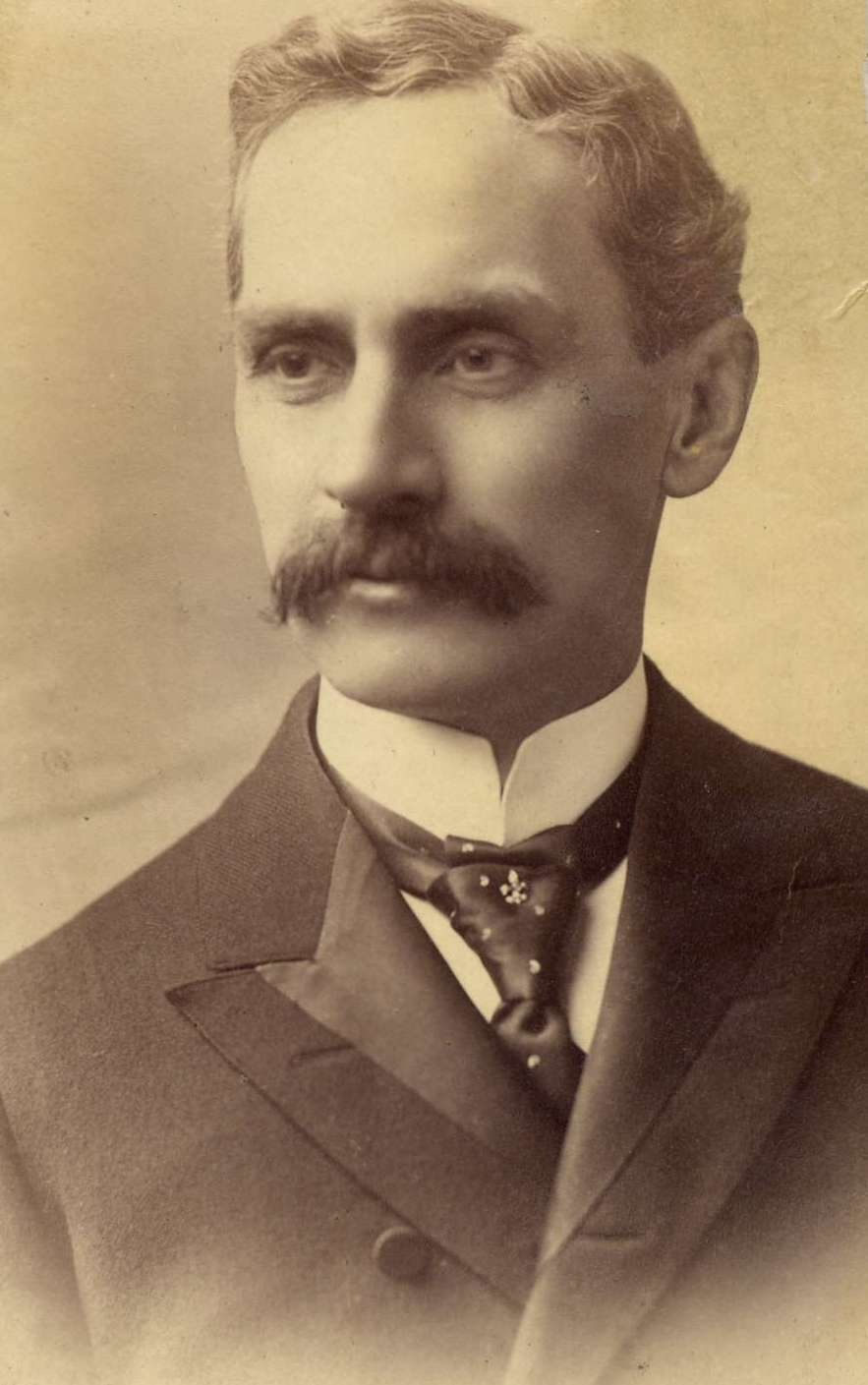
Clarence D. Clark

- Thurman Arnold (1891–1969), associate judge of the Court of Appeals for the D. C. Circuit
- Amos W. Barber (1861–1915), governor of Wyoming (1890–1893)
- John Barrasso (born 1952), Republican U.S. senator from Wyoming (since 2007)
- Frank A. Barrett (1892–1962), U.S. senator, representatives, governor of Wyoming
- Eli Bebout (born 1946), Republican gubernatorial nominee (2002); member of the Wyoming State Senate (since 2007)
- Mary Bellamy (1861–1954), first woman elected to the Wyoming Legislature
- Eliza Stewart Boyd (1833–1912), first woman in America to serve on a jury
- Bryant Butler Brooks (1861–1944), governor of Wyoming (1905–1911)
- Anne Gorsuch Burford (1942–2004), first female administrator of the Environmental Protection Agency; born in Casper
- Harriet Elizabeth Byrd (1926–2015), first African-American elected to the Wyoming Legislature
- John Allen Campbell (1835–1880), first governor of the Wyoming Territory (1869–1875)
- Joseph M. Carey (1845–1924), governor of Wyoming, first U.S. senator from Wyoming
- Robert D. Carey (1878–1937), governor of Wyoming (1919–1923), U.S. senator (1930–1937)
- Vincent Carter (1891–1972), U.S. representative (1929–1935)
- Cale Case (born 1958), Wyoming state senator from Lander (since 1998)
- Fenimore Chatterton (1860–1958), acting governor of Wyoming (1903–1905)
- Dick Cheney (1941–2025), vice president of the United States; raised in Casper; lived in Jackson Hole
- Lynne Cheney (born 1941), member of the American Enterprise Institute for Public Policy Research; chairwoman of the National Endowment for the Humanities; wife of Dick Cheney; born in Casper
- Alonzo M. Clark (1868–1952), governor of Wyoming (1931–1933)
- Clarence D. Clark (1851–1930), member of the Wyoming constitutional convention, U.S. Representative (1890–1893), U.S. senator (1895–1917)
- Tom Coburn (1948–2020), junior Republican senator from Oklahoma; born in Casper
- Henry A. Coffeen (1841–1912), U.S. representative (1893–1895)
- Arthur G. Crane (1877–1955), governor of Wyoming (1949–1951)
- Patrick Crank (born 1959), attorney general of Wyoming (2002–2007)
- Edward D. Crippa (1899–1960), interim U.S. senator (1954)
- Barbara Cubin (born 1946), U.S. representative (1995–2009)
- W. G. Curtis, founder and mayor of Torrington; Wyoming State representative
- Stephen Wheeler Downey (1839–1902), Wyoming territorial government leader; member of the Wyoming congressional convention; University of Wyoming trustee and president
- Frank Emerson (1882–1931), governor of Wyoming (1926–1931)
- Mike Enzi (1944–2021), U.S. senator (1997–2021)
- Dave Freudenthal (born 1950), governor of Wyoming (2003–2011)
- Nancy Freudenthal (born 1954), judge on the United States District Court for the District of Wyoming
- Jack R. Gage (1899–1970), governor of Wyoming (1961–1963)
- Jim Geringer (born 1944), governor of Wyoming (1995–2003)
- Paul Ranous Greever (1891–1943), U.S. Representative (1935–1938); mayor of Cody

H–M

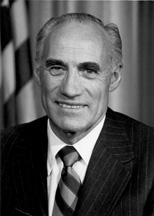
Clifford Hansen

- Clifford Hansen (1912–2009), governor of Wyoming (1963–1967), U.S. senator (1967–1978)
- William Henry Harrison (1896–1990), Republican U.S. representative from Wyoming (1950s and 1960s)
- Stanley K. Hathaway (1924–2005), governor of Wyoming (1967–1975), U.S. secretary of the interior (1975)
- Edgar Herschler (1918–1990), governor of Wyoming (1975–1987)
- John J. Hickey (1911–1970), U.S. senator (1961–1962)
- Frank O. Horton (1882–1948), U.S. representative (1939–1941)
- Lester C. Hunt (1892–1954), governor of Wyoming (1943–1949); U.S. senator (1949–1954)
- John B. Kendrick (1857–1933), governor of Wyoming (1915–1917), U.S. senator (1917–1933)
- Frank E. Lucas (1876–1948), Republican governor of Wyoming (1924–1925)
- Cynthia Lummis (born 1954), Republican U.S. senator from Wyoming (since 2021); former member of both houses of the Wyoming legislature and former state treasurer
- Randall Luthi (born 1953), former speaker of the Wyoming House of Representatives
- Max Maxfield (born 1945), Republican secretary of state of Wyoming
- Rodger McDaniel (born 1948), Democrat, House of Representatives (1970–1976), Wyoming Senate (1976–1980), attorney; author of biography of U.S. Senator Lester C. Hunt (2013)
- Gale W. McGee (1915–1992), U.S. senator (1959–1977)
- John J. McIntyre (1904–1974), U.S. representative (1941–1943); Wyoming Supreme Court justice
- Ron Micheli (born 1948), former Republican member of Wyoming Legislature, former Wyoming director of Agriculture
- Leslie A. Miller (1886–1970), governor of Wyoming (1932–1939)
- Franklin Wheeler Mondell (1860–1939), U.S. representative (1895–1897, 1899–1923)

N–Z

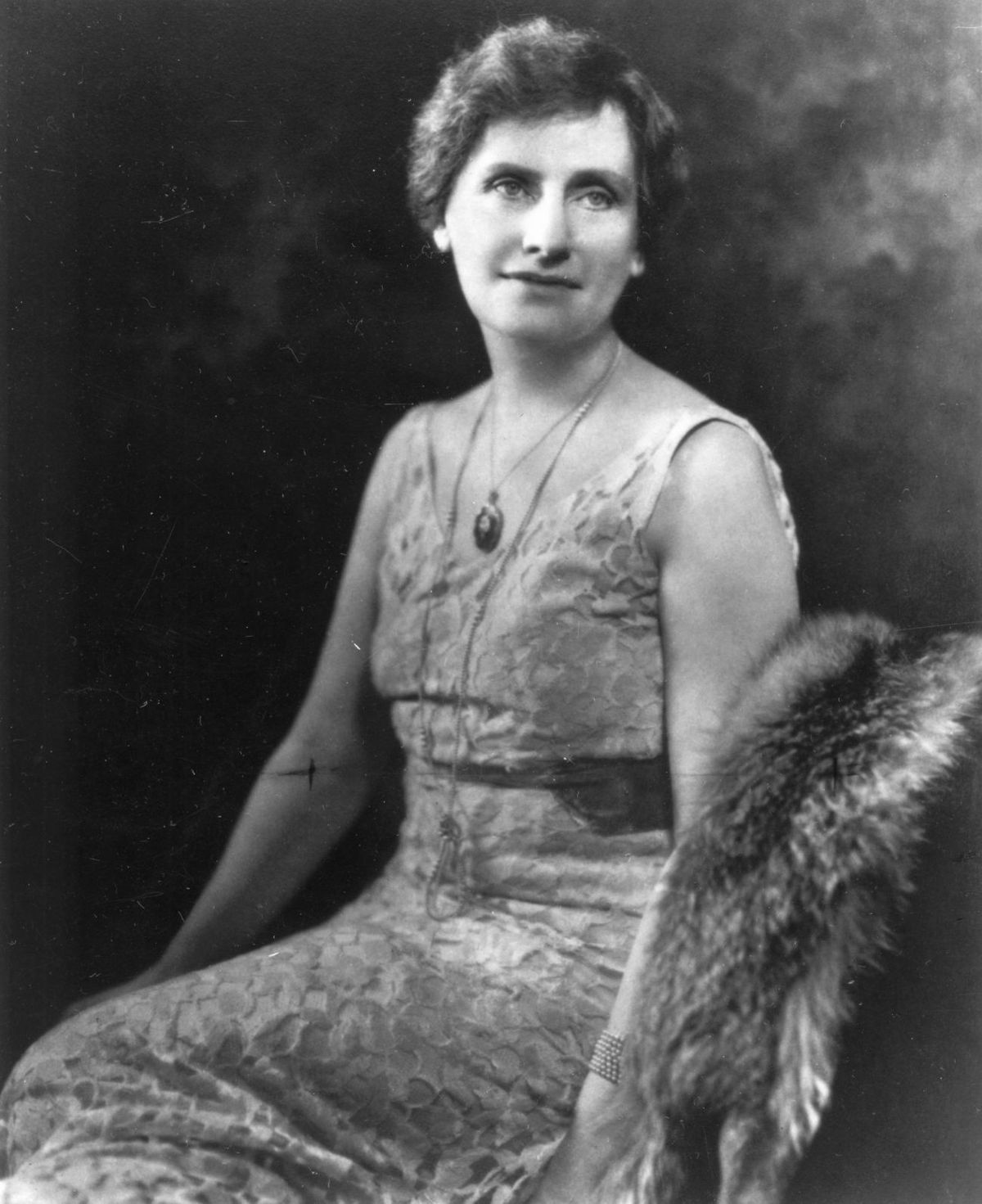
Nellie Tayloe Ross

- Joseph C. O'Mahoney (1884–1962), U.S. senator (1934–1953, 1954–1961)
- John Eugene Osborne (1858–1943), governor of Wyoming (1892–1895), U.S. representative (1987–1999)
- Dana Perino (born 1972), 26th White House press secretary
- DeForest Richards (1846–1903), governor of Wyoming (1899–1903)
- William A. Richards (1849–1912), governor of Wyoming (1895–1899)
- Edward V. Robertson (1881–1963), U.S. senator (1943–1949)
- Teno Roncalio (1916–2003), U.S. representative (1965–1967, 1971–1978)
- Nellie Tayloe Ross (1876–1977), governor of Wyoming (1925–1927), first female governor of a U.S. state
- William B. Ross (1873–1924), governor of Wyoming (1923–1924)
- Tom Sansonetti (born 1949), assistant U.S. attorney general for the Environment and Natural Resources Division of the Justice Department
- Henry H. Schwartz (1869–1955), U.S. senator (1937–1943)
- Bryan Sharratt (1947–2007), member of Clinton administration defense team; Democratic candidate for Congress (1988), having been defeated by Dick Cheney
- Alan K. Simpson (1931–2025), U.S. senator (1979–1997)
- Milward L. Simpson (1897–1993), Republican governor and U.S. senator from Wyoming
- Mike Sullivan (born 1939), governor of Wyoming (1987–1995)
- Patrick Sullivan (1880–1959), Wyoming state representative (1913–1917)
- Patrick Joseph Sullivan (1865–1935), mayor of Casper; U.S. senator (1929–1930)
- John Thayer (1820–1906), governor of Wyoming Territory (1875–1878)
- Craig L. Thomas (1930–2007), U.S. senator (1995–2007)
- Edwin Keith Thomson (1919–1960), U.S. representative (1955–1960)
- Thyra Thomson (1916–2013), Wyoming secretary of state (1962–1987)
- Malcolm Wallop (1933–2011), U.S. senator (1977–1995)
- Francis E. Warren (1844–1929), governor of Wyoming (1890), U.S. senator (1890–1893, 1895–1929)
- James G. Watt (1938–2023), U.S. secretary of the interior (1981–1983)
- Charles E. Winter (1870–1948), U.S. representative (1923–1929)
- John S. Wold (1916–2017), U.S. representative (1969–1971)

== Sportspeople ==
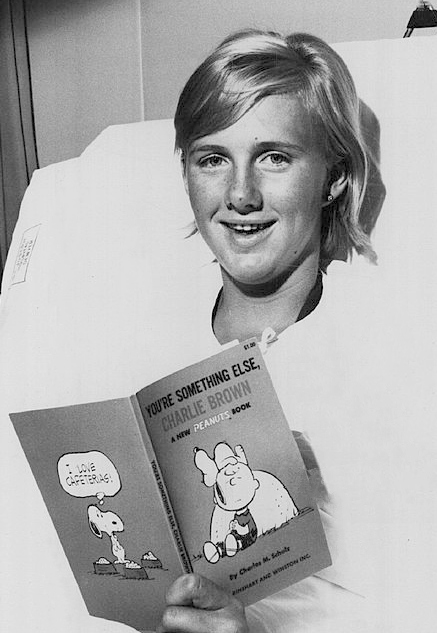
Karen Budge

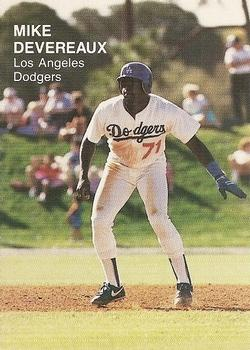
Mike Devereaux

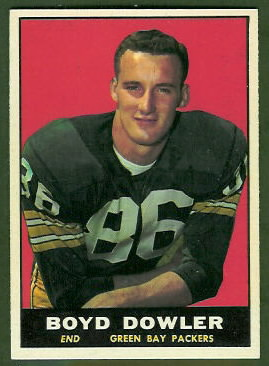
Boyd Dowler

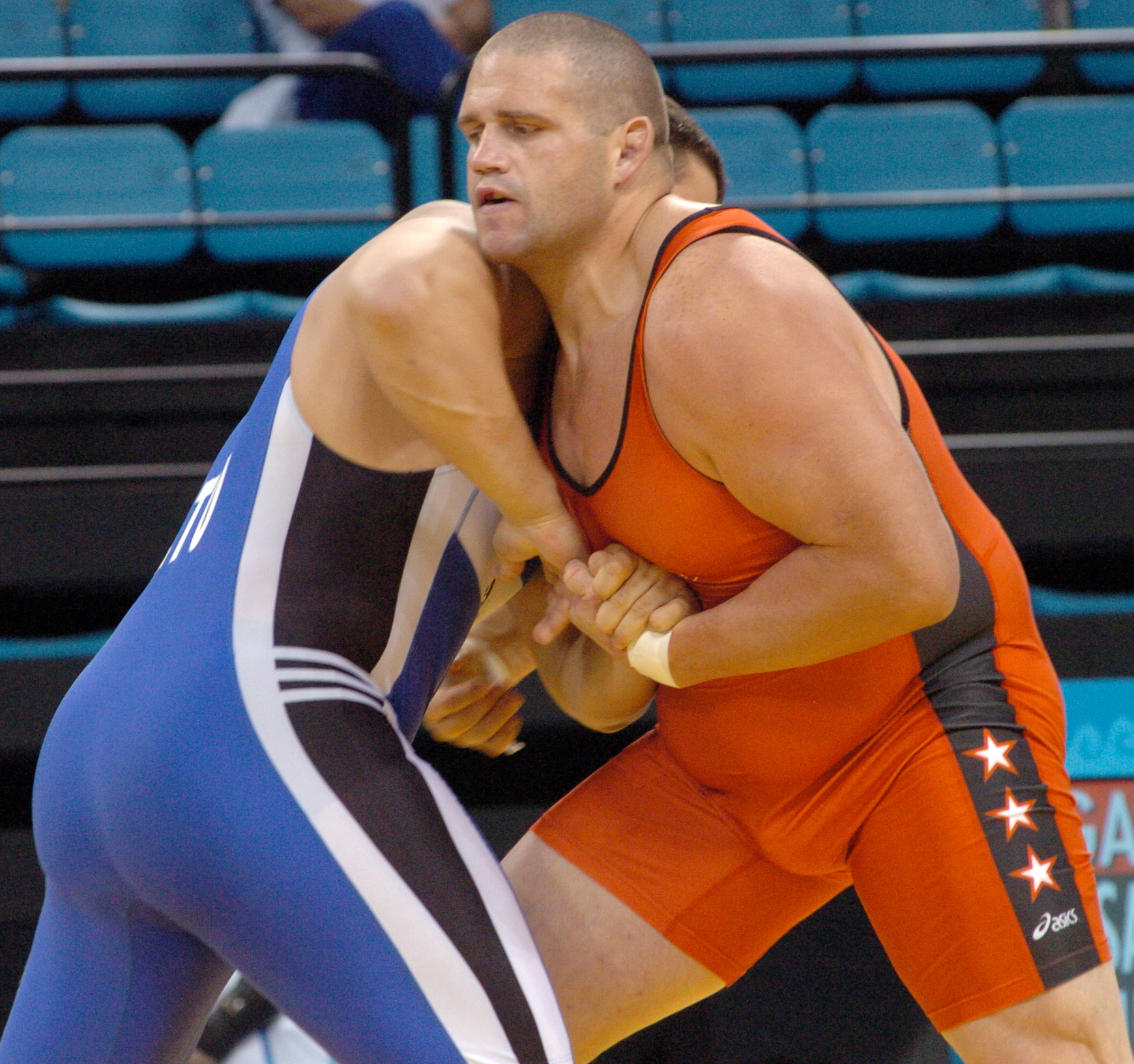
Rulon Gardner

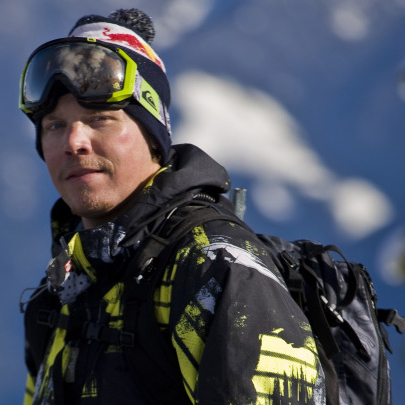
Travis Rice

- Adam Archuleta (born 1977), professional football player; born in Rock Springs
- Zane Beadles (born 1986), professional football player; born in Casper
- Nick Bebout (born 1951), professional football player; played for the University of Wyoming; born in Riverton
- Jim Benepe (born 1963), professional golfer; born in Sheridan
- Jacob Bobenmoyer (born 1997), NFL long snapper for the Denver Broncos; Born in Cheyenne
- Bill Briggs (born 1931), pioneer in ski mountaineering, lives in Jackson Hole
- Tom Browning (born 1960), MLB pitcher; born in Casper
- John Buck (born 1980), MLB catcher, born in Kemmerer
- Karen Budge (born 1949), former World Cup and Olympic alpine ski racer; born in Jackson
- Jaycee Carroll (born 1983), professional basketball player; born in Laramie
- Gail Cogdill (1937–2016), professional football player; born in Worland
- Chris Cooley (born 1982), professional football player; born in Powell
- Alicia Craig (born 1982), distance runner; born in Gillette
- Jesseca Cross (born 1975), Olympic athlete; born in Laramie
- Lance Deal (born 1961), Olympic athlete; born in Riverton; attended high school in Casper
- Mike Devereaux (born 1963), MLB outfielder; NLCS MVP in 1995 with the Atlanta Braves; born in Casper
- Boyd Dowler (born 1937), professional football player; born in Rock Springs
- Aaron Elling (born 1978), professional football player; played for the University of Wyoming; lived in Lander
- Dick Ellsworth (1940–2022), MLB pitcher; born in Lusk
- Rulon Gardner (born 1971), wrestler; Olympic gold medalist in Greco-Roman wrestling; born in Afton
- John Godina (born 1972), shot putter; three-time world champion; two-time Olympic medalist; lived in Cheyenne
- W. Dan Hausel (born 1949), hall-of-fame karate and kobudo grandmaster
- Jerry Hill (born 1939), professional football player; born in Torrington
- Bryan Iguchi (born 1973), snowboarder; 1997 X-Games bronze medalist in half-pipe; lives in Jackson Hole
- James Johnson (born 1987), professional basketball player for the Toronto Raptors; born in Cheyenne
- Jaelin Kauf (born 1996), Olympic freestyle skier; born in Alta
- Brett Keisel (born 1978), professional football player for the Pittsburgh Steelers; born in Greybull
- Mike Lansing (born 1968), MLB infielder; born in Rawlins
- Nate Marquardt (born 1979), Ultimate Fighting Championship middleweight fighter; born in Lander
- Bryce Meredith (born 1995), professional MMA fighter, three-time NCAA Division I wrestling All-American and two-time National Finalist; born in Cheyenne
- Tommy Moe (born 1970), world-class alpine skier; two-time Olympic medalist; member of the National Ski Hall of Fame; lives in Jackson Hole
- Heather Moody (born 1973), water polo player; two-time Olympic medalist; lived in Green River
- Jonah Nickerson (born 1985), pitcher for the Oregon State Beavers; born in Casper
- Brandon Nimmo (born 1993), outfielder for New York Mets; born in Cheyenne
- Jay Novacek (born 1962), professional football player; played college football at the University of Wyoming
- Gail O'Brien (1911–1978), professional football player; born in Cheyenne
- Brady Poppinga (born 1979), professional football player; born in Evanston
- Chris Prosinski (born 1987), professional football player; born in Newcastle
- Travis Rice (born 1982), professional snowboarder; co-producer of documentary films That's It, That's All (2008) and The Art of Flight (2011); born and raised in Jackson Hole
- Ken Sailors (1921–2016), professional basketball player; popularized the jump shot; member of the National Collegiate Basketball Hall of Fame; raised outside Hillsdale, Wyoming; played college basketball at the University of Wyoming
- Todd Skinner (1958–2006), rock climber; born in Pinedale
- Rick Sofield (born 1956), MLB outfielder; born in Cheyenne
- Josef Stiegler (born 1937), world-class alpine skier; three-time Olympic medalist in slalom and giant slalom; lives in Jackson Hole
- Resi Stiegler (born 1985), alpine skier; born and raised in Jackson Hole
- John Wendling (born 1983), professional football player; born in Cody
- Jamila Wideman (born 1975), left-handed point guard basketball player, lawyer and activist
- Logan Wilson (born 1996), professional football player for the Cincinnati Bengals; born and raised in Casper

== Miscellaneous ==
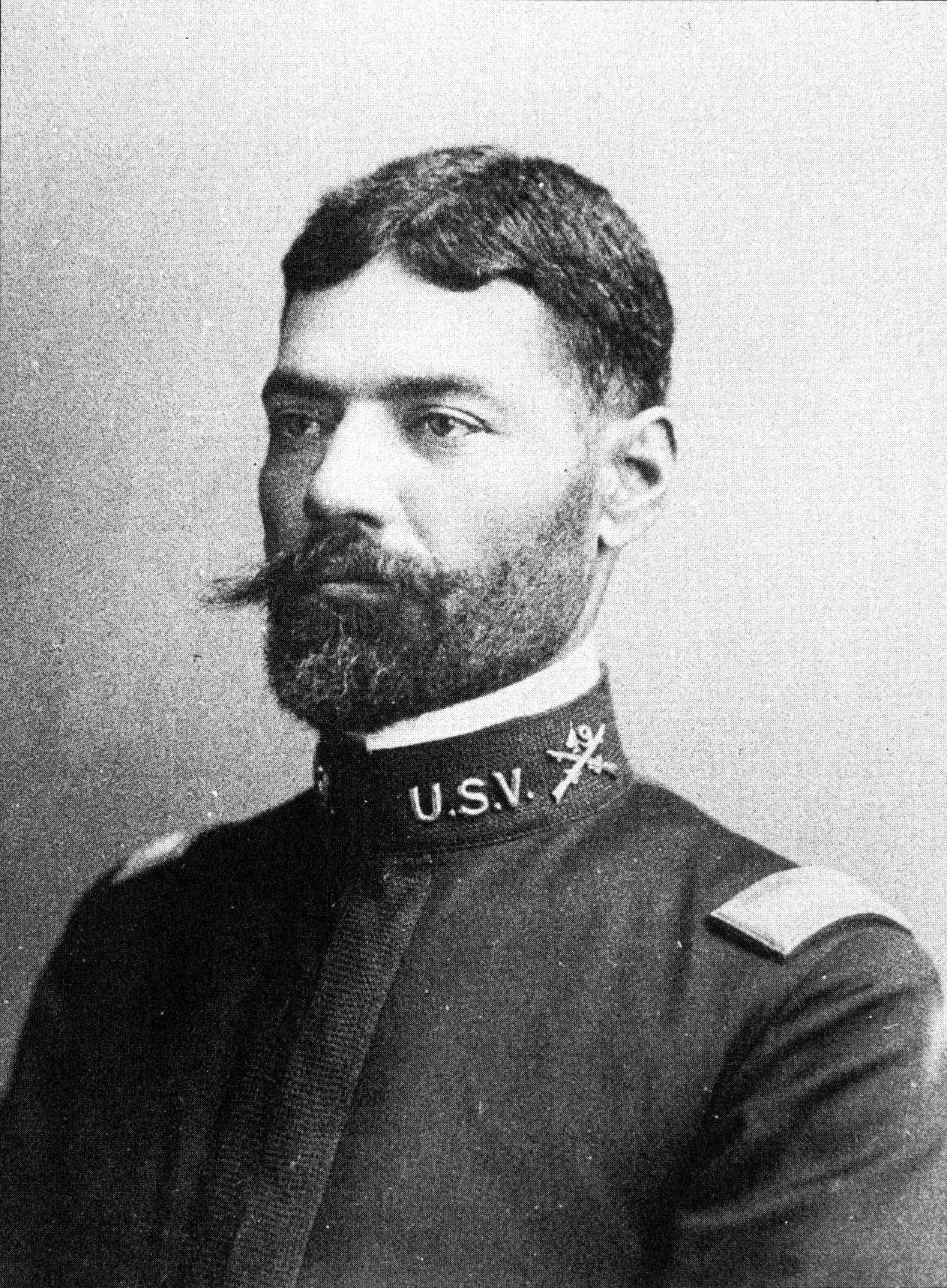
Edward L. Baker Jr.

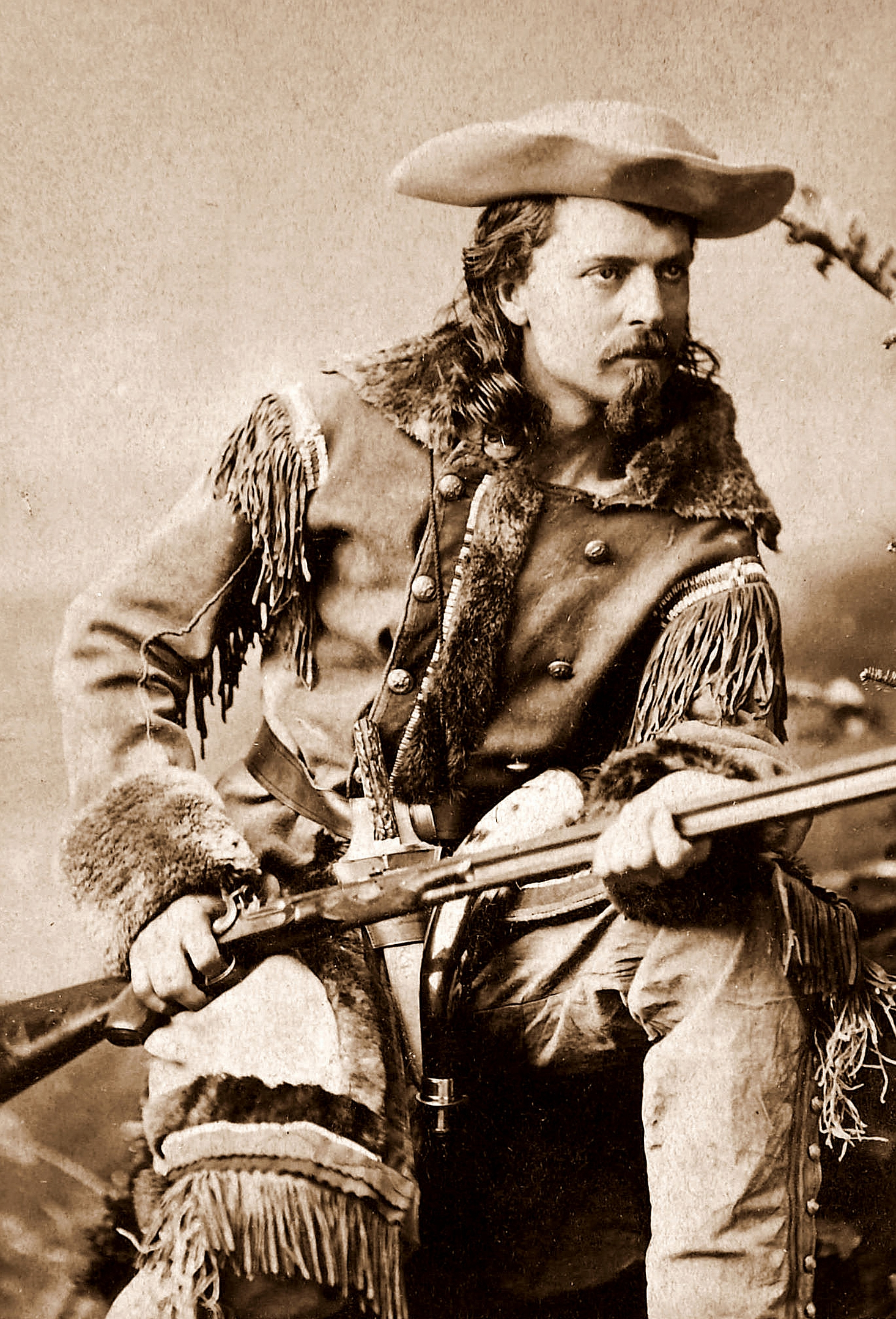
Buffalo Bill

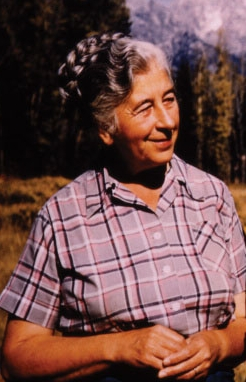
Margaret Murie

- Thurman Arnold (1891–1969), lawyer and judge; born in Laramie
- Edward L. Baker Jr. (1865–1913), United States Army; recipient, Medal of Honor; born in Laramie County
- Harold Roe Bartle (1901–1974), lawyer; politician; helped to establish Scouting in Wyoming
- George T. Beck (1856–1943), politician; businessman; helped William Cody establish the town of Cody
- "Buffalo Bill" Cody (1846–1917), Old West figure; helped create Cody
- John Colter (1774–1813), explorer; first white man to set foot in Wyoming
- Clayton Danks (1879–1970), model cowboy on the Wyoming trademark, the Bucking Horse and Rider; winner of three competitions at Cheyenne Frontier Days
- Black Elk (1863–1950), heyoka of the Oglala Lakota people
- Otto Franc (1846–1903), cattle baron and homesteader in the Big Horn Basin
- Friday – Chief and interpreter of Northern Arapaho
- Lilian Heath (1865–1962), first female doctor in Wyoming
- James L. Herdt (born 1947), master chief petty officer of the Navy; born in Casper
- Leonard S. Hobbs (1896–1977), aeronautical engineer and author; won the 1952 Collier Trophy for designing the P&W J57 turbojet engine; born in Carbon County
- Raymond A. Johnson (1912–1984), aviation pioneer
- Harold McCracken (1894–1983), creator and director of the Buffalo Bill Historical Center in Cody
- M. Margaret McKeown (born 1951), U.S. Appeals Court Judge; born in Casper
- Esther Hobart Morris (1814–1902), appointed first female judge in United States in 1870 to complete the term of a justice who resigned in protest of the Wyoming Territory's passage of women's suffrage
- Margaret Murie (1902–2003), conservationist; lived in Wyoming
- John Pedersen (1881–1951), firearms designer who worked for Remington Arms
- Chance Phelps (1985–2004), soldier; born in Dubois
- Pretty Nose – Arapaho woman
- Sacagawea – Native American explorer (c.1788 – 1812)
- Matthew Shepard (1976–1998), murdered student from the University of Wyoming; born in Casper
- Jedediah Smith (1799–1831), mountain man, trapper, explorer; first American to get to California from the East
- Gerry Spence (1929–2025), lawyer; born in Laramie
- Willis Van Devanter (1859–1941), city attorney for Cheyenne; chief judge of Wyoming territorial court; associate justice of the Supreme Court of the United States (1911–1937)
- Washakie – Eastern Shoshone chief
- Robert R. Wilson (1914–2000), physicist; a group leader of the Manhattan Project; born in Frontier

== See also ==
- List of Wyoming attorneys general
- List of Wyoming suffragists
