= Travis Rice =

American professional snowboarder (born 1982)

Medal record

Men's snowboarding

Representing United States

Winter X Games
Gold medal – first place	2002 Aspen	Slopestyle
Gold medal – first place	2009 Aspen	Big Air
Bronze medal – third place	2004 Aspen	Slopestyle
Silver medal – second place	2007 Aspen	Best Trick

TTR World Snowboard Tour
Bronze medal – third place	2007	Overall

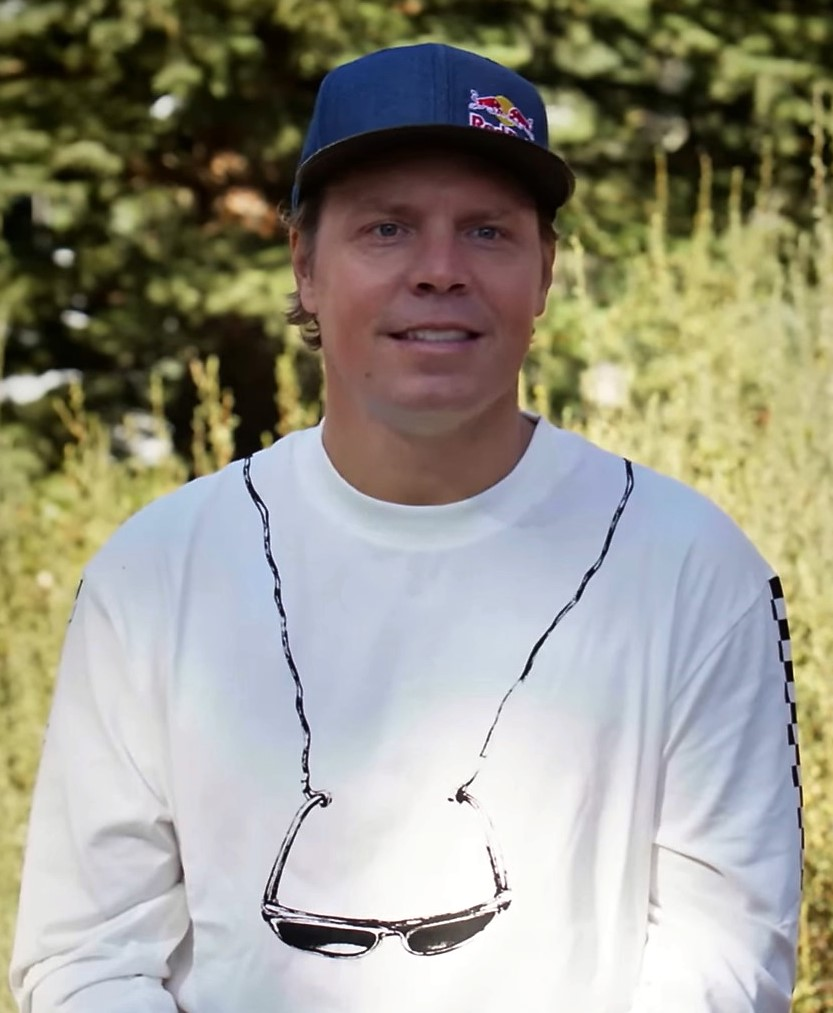
Rice in 2022

Travis Rice (born October 9, 1982) is an American professional snowboarder. He is #13 on Snowboarder magazine's list of the 20 most influential snowboarders of the last 20 years. The 41-year-old has featured in more than twenty snowboarding films. Rice's biggest claim to fame came when he arrived at Snowboarder magazine's Superpark contest at Mammoth Mountain and launched a 'mammoth' of a backside rodeo across a 117-foot gap jump. He has been considered "the Paul Revere" of the big mountain freestyle movement. In 2013, Rice was named the best contemporary snowboarder in the world by Red Bull; Rice was also hailed as one of the greatest snowboarders of all time by numerous writers and publications.

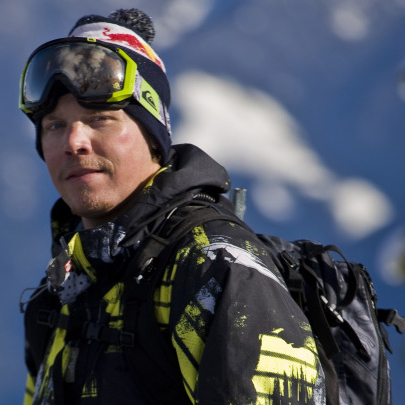

== Early life ==
Rice was born in Jackson Hole, Wyoming. He was raised near Jackson Hole Mountain Resort, in Wilson, Wyoming where he continues to reside in the region. Raised as a skier by his father, Paul Rice, a member of Jackson Hole Ski Patrol, Rice initially did not understand the rave of the new sport springing up on his mountain. However, he soon caught on and joined the local team.

He has a sister named Ashley Rice. His mother is Becky Rice.

== Competition ==
In 2001, without a sponsor and only 18 years old, Rice drove to Mammoth Mountain in California to ride at Snowboarder magazine's “Superpark”. Recognition from the snowboarding world would come at this event, when Rice launched a backside rodeo off a 117 foot gap jump. Absinthe Films' producer Justin Hostynek immediately approached Rice to begin filming for their upcoming movie, Transcendence.

=== Films and Other Media ===
Rice has filmed outstanding video parts year after year, producing jaw-dropping shots like his switch 540 over Chad's Gap in Utah, a 120 foot backcountry gap jump. On top of that, he has won several US Opens, an X-Games gold, and an Icer Air gold, where he landed the first double rodeo 1080 in competition.

In 2008, Rice co-produced (with filmmaker Curt Morgan) and starred in the snowboarding film That's It That's All. This film featured Troy Blackburn, Jeremy Jones, Mark Landvik, Terje Haakonsen, Nicolas Müller, Scotty Lago, Pat Moore, John Jackson, Jake Blauvelt, Danny Kass, and fellow Jackson Hole residents Bryan Iguchi and Kyle Clancy. Rice's part in That's It, That's All, which included the first ever double cork 1260, heavily influenced his sweep at the Transworld Magazine Rider's Poll. He won Rider of the Year, Video Part of the Year, Standout of the Year, and Readers’ Choice award. On September 7, 2011, Rice released The Art of Flight, a film made in collaboration with the same team behind 'That's It, That's All, including John Jackson, Mark Landvik, Nicolas Müller and Jeremy Jones, Scotty Lago, and Mark McMorris. The success of the Art of Flight enabled Rice to once again win the TransWorld and Snowboarder Magazine Rider of the Year awards for 2012 .

In 2012, Rice coordinated with Red Bull to create natural selection, a backcountry freestyle competition held at Baldface Lodge in British Columbia, Canada. The competition was attended by the world's top snowboarders, including Nicolas Muller, Gigi Ruf and Mark McMorris, with riders competing in naturally created backcountry terrain. The inaugural winner of the event was the competition creator, Travis Rice.

Rice is a downloadable, playable character in SSX. He is the first "real-life" snowboarder to ever be featured in the franchise.

In 2016, Rice released The Fourth Phase. In 2019, he released Dark Matter.

=== Highlights ===
Travis Rice's professional snowboarding career started in 2001. Various competition results taken from EXPN.

2023

- 1st, Yeti Natural Selection Tour Revelstoke, BC

2016-2017

- TransWorld Snowboarding Men's Readers Choice Award

2011–2012

- 1st, Red Bull Supernatural, Baldface Lodge, BC (Backcountry Freestyle)
- TransWorld Rider of the Year (4th ROTY Award)
- Snowboarder Magazine Rider of the Year (2nd ROTY Award)
- National Geographic Adventurer of the Year

2008–2009

- 1st (Gold), X-Games Big Air Competition (2009)
- 4th – CJ – 5Star Red Bull Snow Scrapers (Ticket to Ride (World Snowboard Tour))
- TransWorld Rider of the Year (3rd ROTY Award)
- Snowboarder Magazine Rider of the Year

2007–2008

- 1st, Quiksilver Natural Selection, Jackson Hole, WY, (Backcountry Freestyle)
- 11th, Nokia Air & Style Big Air Competition
- 1st, ICER AIR, San Francisco, CA (Big Air event). With a best run score of 95 for his Double backside Rodeo 1080.
- 1st Winter X Games Big Air Double Cork 1080

2006–2007

- 1st, US Open Slopestyle (2007)
- 2nd (Silver), Winter X Games, Snowboard Best Trick (2007)

2005–2006

- 12th, FIS World Cup #1, Valle Nevado, Chile (Halfpipe)
- 8th, Nokia Air & Style, Munich, Germany (Slopestyle)
- 51st, Chevrolet US Snowboard Grand Prix Halfpipe #1
- 26th, Chevrolet US Snowboard Grand Prix Halfpipe #2
- 9th, X Games 10 (Slopestyle)
- 2nd, Honda Session at Vail, Co (Rail)
- 3rd, Honda Session at Vail, Co (Slopestyle)
- 33rd, Ticket To Ride World Snowboard Tour (Season End Rankings, Overall)

2004–2005

- TransWorld Rider of the Year, Reader's Choice (2nd ROTY Award)
- Named by Faces Magazine as one of the Top 20 Greatest Athletes Now
- 3rd (Bronze), Winter X Games 2005 (Slopestyle)
- 2nd, X-Trail Jam, Tokyo, Japan (Quarterpipe)
- 3rd, X-Trail Jam, Tokyo, Japan (Straight Jump)
- 1st, US Snowboard Grandprix, Breckenridge, Co (Rails)
- 2nd, US Snowboard Grandprix, Breckenridge, Co (Halfpipe)
- 8th, US Snowboard Grandprix Season End Ranking (Halfpipe)
- 10th, X Games 2005 (Superpipe)
- 2nd, Abominable Snow Jam, Mount Hood, Oregon (Quarterpipe)
- 3rd, Abominable Snow Jam, Mount Hood, Oregon (Slopestyle)

2003–2004

- TransWorld Rider of the Year (2004)
- Ticket To Ride (TTR) World Snowboard Tour – Quarterpipe Champion (2003/2004)
- 1st, Arctic Challenge, Trysilfjellet, Norway (Quarterpipe Overall)
- 9th, Arctic Challenge, Trysilfjellet, Norway (Slopestyle)
- 1st, Boost Mobile Pro-Jam (Rail)
- 1st, Boost Mobile Pro-Jam
- 4th, Winter X Games 2003 (Slopestyle)
- 21st, Winter X Games 2003 (Superpipe)
- 1st, Abominable Snow Jam (Slopestyle)
- 1st, Abominable Snow Jam (Quarterpipe)
- 1st, Grand Prix, Breckenridge, Co. (Rail)
- 1st, X-Rail Jam Tokyodome 2003 (Jam Session)
- 1st, US Open Rail Jam
- 1st, The Session, Vail, Co. (Rail)
- 4th, The Session, Vail, Co. (Slopestyle)
- 1st, Montana Christchurch Big Air, New Zealand

2002–2003

- 1st (Gold), Winter X-Games, 2002 (Slopestyle)
- Ticket To Ride (TTR) World Snowboard Tour – Quarterpipe Champion (2002/2003)
- 1st, Grand Prix, Breckenridge (Big Air)
- 4th, World Snowboard Federation Season End (Slopestyle)
- 4th, The Session, Vail, Colorado (Slopestyle)
- 1st, The Session, Vail, Colorado (Rail Jam)
- 2nd, Toyota Slopestyle, Kijimadaira, Japan (Slopestyle)
- 3rd, US Open, Stratton, Vermont (Slopestyle)
- 1st, US Open, Stratton, Vermont (Rail Jam)

2001–2002

- TransWorld Rookie Of The Year
- 1st (FIS Halfpipe), FIS, Park City
- 2nd, Vans Triple Crown Series, Breckenridge, Colorado (Slopestyle)
- 3rd, Vans Triple Crown Series, Snow Summit, California (Slopestyle)
- 4th, World Championships, Vail, Co. (Slopestyle)
- 1st, Yahoo Big Air, Breckenridge, Co. (Big Air)
- 7th, US Grand Prix, Mount Bachelor, Oregon (Halfpipe)
- 9th, Vans Triple Crown (Season End, Overall)

== Video parts ==
- Dark Matter (2019)
- Roadless (2018)
- Depth Perception – (2017)
- The Fourth Phase – (2016)
- The Art of Flight – Brainfarm (2011)
- Neverland – Absinthe Films (2009)
- That's It, That's All (2008)
- DC MTN.LAB 1.5 (2007)
- Billabong – Lines (2007)
- DC MTN.LAB
- The Gap Session
- First Descent
- The Community Project
- Pop
- Night of the Living Shred
- The Prophecy (2002)
- Revenge of the Grenerds
- Futureproof
- More
- Full Metal Edges
- Saturation
- Vivid (2002)
- Deeper (2010)
- Blacklight (2001)
- Transcendence (2002)
