= That's It, That's All =

- Directed by: Curt Morgan
- Produced by: Michael Lythcott; Circe Wallace; Travis Rice
- Starring: Travis Rice; Jake Blauvelt; Kyle Clancy; Terje Håkonsen; Bryan Iguchi; John Jackson; Jeremy Jones; Scotty Lago; Mark Landvik; Nicolas Müller
- Cinematography: Mark Hryma; Gabe Langlois; Gabriel Langlois; Curt Morgan; Curtis Morgan; John Trapman
- Edited by: Curt Morgan; Curtis Morgan
- Production company: Brain Farm Productions
- Release date: November 14, 2008
- Running time: 60 minutes
- Countries: United States, Austria
- Language: English

That's It, That's All is a 2008 documentary film about snowboarding written by Brain Farm Productions and directed by Curt Morgan. It is the predecessor to The Art of Flight film, released on DVD on November 14, 2008. The film presents the life of an influential snowboarder Travis Rice and his crew, while facing different challenges in the professional world of sport.

== Cast ==
- Travis Rice
- Jake Blauvelt
- Kyle Clancy
- Terje Håkonsen
- Bryan Iguchi
- John Jackson
- Jeremy Jones
- Danny Kass
- Scotty Lago
- Mark Landvik
- Pat Moore
- Nicolas Müller

== Production ==
The film's action takes place in different places around the world such as: New Zealand, Valdez, B.C., Munich, Tokyo, Jackson Hole and Japan, including a great number of landscapes, mostly captured by a helicopter's crane camera.

The making of the film took around two years and was entirely produced as high definition documentary with high values.

== Awards ==
- Audience Award at Newport Beach Film Festival 2009
