= Professional Engineers Day (U.S.) =

Professional Engineers Day was launched by the National Society of Professional Engineers in 2016 to celebrate and raise public awareness of the contributions of licensed professional engineers in the United States. As of 2015, there were 474,777 licensed professional engineers in the U.S. The first Professional Engineers Day was celebrated on August 3, 2016.

== History ==
The idea for Professional Engineers Day came from Tim Austin, PE, a professional engineer from Kansas who served as president of the National Society of Professional Engineers in 2015–16. While promotion of engineering in the US is common, such as the attention given to STEM fields and events such as the USA Science and Engineering Festival and National Engineers Week (U.S.), which was also founded by NSPE in 1951, Austin believed attention should be paid specifically to the contributions of licensed professional engineers because of NSPE's core principle which states, "Being a licensed professional engineer means more than just holding a certificate and possessing technical competence. It is a commitment to hold the public health, safety, and welfare above all other considerations.""NSPE's Statement of Principles".

Of course, an idea is just an idea unless actions are taken to turn that idea into something tangible. Led by then Executive Director, Mark J. Golden, CAE, Communications Director David Siegel, and Public Relation & Outreach Manager Stacey Ober, the NSPE staff created the celebratory event known today as PE Day, which is mostly a virtual event across social media platforms. The success of PE Day and the efforts of NSPE staff was recognized by the Association of Media & Publishing in the category "Promotional Content: Social Media Campaign" in June 2018

Licensing of professional engineers in the US began in 1907, when Clarence Johnston, the state engineer of Wyoming, presented a bill to the Wyoming legislature that would require registration for those representing themselves to the public as an engineer or land surveyor. The bill was later enacted, making the state the first in the US to register engineers and land surveyors.

On August 8, 1907, Charles Bellamy of Wyoming received the first professional engineering license. Professional Engineers Day is held the first Wednesday in August to mark that occasion. Incidentally, Bellamy's wife, Mary Godot Bellamy, is also known for a first: the first woman elected to the Wyoming legislature.

Charles Bellamy founded Bellamy & Sons Engineers in 1913.

The Bellamy Chapter of the Wyoming Society of Professional Engineers is named in his honor.

Today, for the purpose of protecting the public, all US states and territories license professional engineers. Professional Engineers make contributions in virtually all areas of society, industry, and economy including, among other things, energy, transportation, manufacturing, communications, environment, mining, building, defense, education, medical, and consumer products.

To mark the inaugural Professional Engineers Day in 2016, governors from Kansas, Ohio, Oklahoma, Louisiana, and Wisconsin signed proclamations recognizing the contributions licensed professional engineers make to their states and society.
