= Robert R. Wilson =

American physicist (1914–2000)

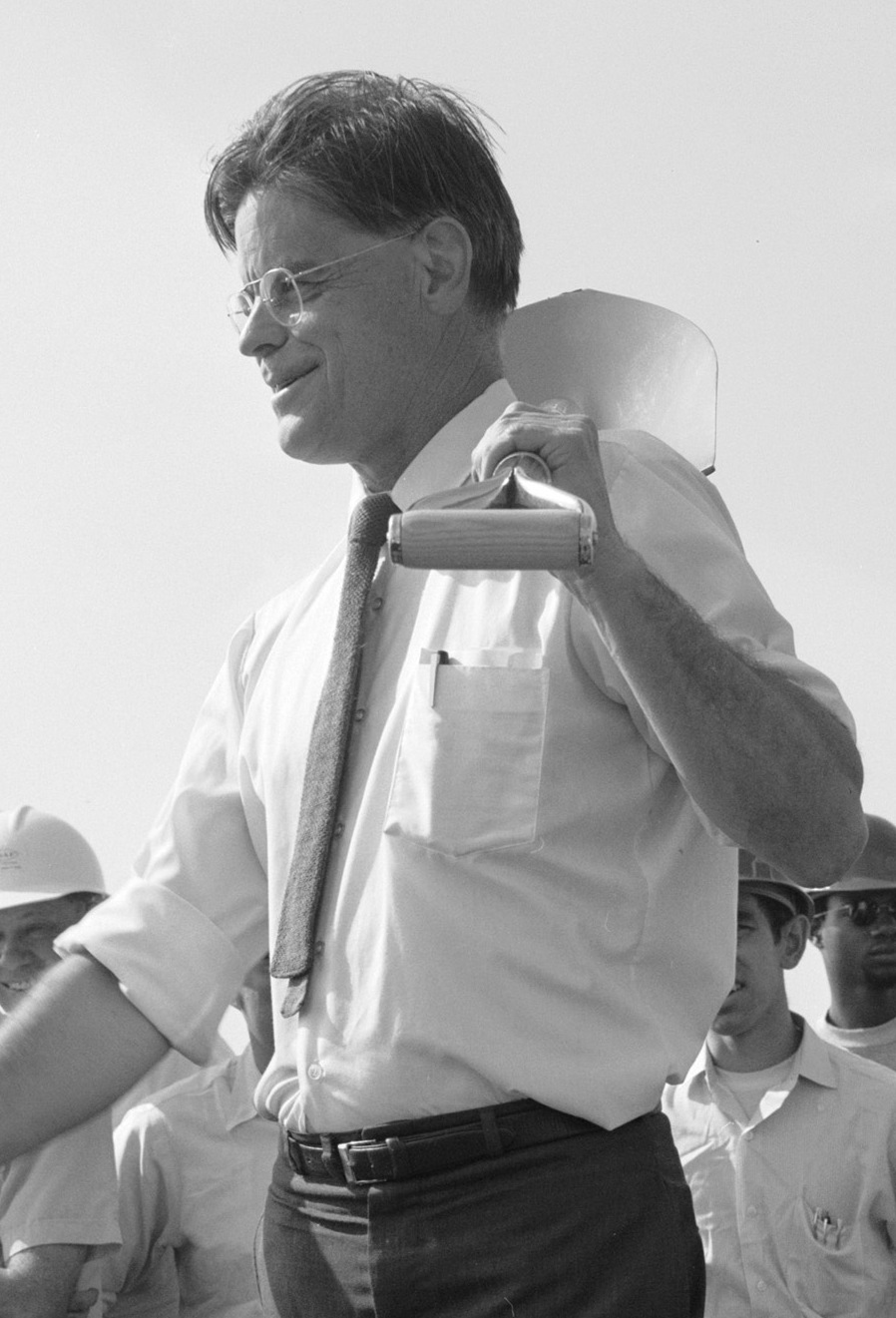
- Wilson at the Fermilab groundbreaking ceremony
- Born: March 4, 1914; Frontier, Wyoming, U.S.
- Died: January 16, 2000 (aged 85); Ithaca, New York, U.S.
- Education: University of California, Berkeley (BA, MS, PhD)
- Awards: Elliott Cresson Medal (1964); National Medal of Science (1973); Enrico Fermi Award (1984); Andrew Gemant Award (1995)
- Scientific career
- Fields: Physics
- Workplaces: University of California, Berkeley; Los Alamos Laboratory; Harvard University; Cornell University; Fermilab; University of Chicago; Columbia University
- Thesis: Theory of the Cyclotron (1940)
- Doctoral advisor: Ernest Lawrence

Robert Rathbun Wilson (March 4, 1914 – January 16, 2000) was an American physicist known for his work on the Manhattan Project during World War II, as a sculptor, and as an architect of the Fermi National Accelerator Laboratory (Fermilab), where he was the first director from 1967 to 1978.

A graduate of the University of California, Berkeley, Wilson received his doctorate under the supervision of Ernest Lawrence for his work on the development of the cyclotron at the Berkeley Radiation Laboratory. He subsequently went to Princeton University to work with Henry DeWolf Smyth on electromagnetic separation of the isotopes of uranium. In 1943, Wilson and many of his colleagues joined the Manhattan Project's Los Alamos Laboratory, where Wilson became the head of its Cyclotron Group (R-1), and later its Research (R) Division.

After the war, Wilson briefly joined the faculty of Harvard University as an associate professor, then went to Cornell University as professor of physics and the director of its new Laboratory of Nuclear Studies. Wilson and his Cornell colleagues constructed four electron synchrotrons, and Cornell's synchrotron facility was later named the Wilson Synchrotron Laboratory in his honor. In 1967 he assumed directorship of the National Accelerator Laboratory, subsequently known as Fermilab. He managed to complete the facility on time and under budget, but at the same time made it aesthetically pleasing, with a main administrative building purposely reminiscent of the Beauvais Cathedral, and a restored prairie with a herd of American Bison. He resigned in 1978 in a protest against inadequate government funding.

== Early life ==
Robert Rathbun Wilson was born in Frontier, Wyoming, in 1914, the son of Platt Elvin and Edith Elizabeth (Rathbun) Wilson. He had an older sister, Mary Jane. His parents separated when he was eight years old, and custody was awarded to his father, although he lived with his mother from time to time. Much of his early life was spent on cattle ranches. He changed schools frequently, and attended a number of schools, including the Todd School in Woodstock, Illinois, where his grandmother worked.

Wilson entered the University of California, Berkeley, in 1932, and was awarded his Bachelor of Arts (AB) degree cum laude in 1936. He joined Ernest O. Lawrence's Radiation Laboratory, which was at that time blossoming into the top American site for both experimental and theoretical physics due to the efforts of Lawrence and J. Robert Oppenheimer, respectively. Wilson received his Doctor of Philosophy (PhD) in 1940 for his thesis on "Theory of the Cyclotron". That year he married Jane Inez Scheyer.

Wilson ran into trouble with Lawrence's harsh frugality while working on his cyclotron and was fired twice from the Radiation Laboratory. The first time was for losing a rubber seal in the 37-inch cyclotron which prevented its use in a demonstration to a potential donor. He was later rehired at Luis Alvarez's urging, but melted an expensive pair of pliers while welding, and was fired again. Though offered his job back, he decided instead to go to Princeton University to work with Henry DeWolf Smyth.

== Manhattan Project ==
At Princeton, Wilson eventually took over Smyth's project of the development of an alternative approach to electromagnetic separation from Lawrence's calutron method, used for the purpose of separating the fissile uranium-235 isotope of uranium from the much more common uranium-238, which is a key step to producing an atomic bomb. By 1941 the project had produced a device called the "isotron," which, unlike the calutron, used an electrical field to separate the uranium instead of a magnetic one.

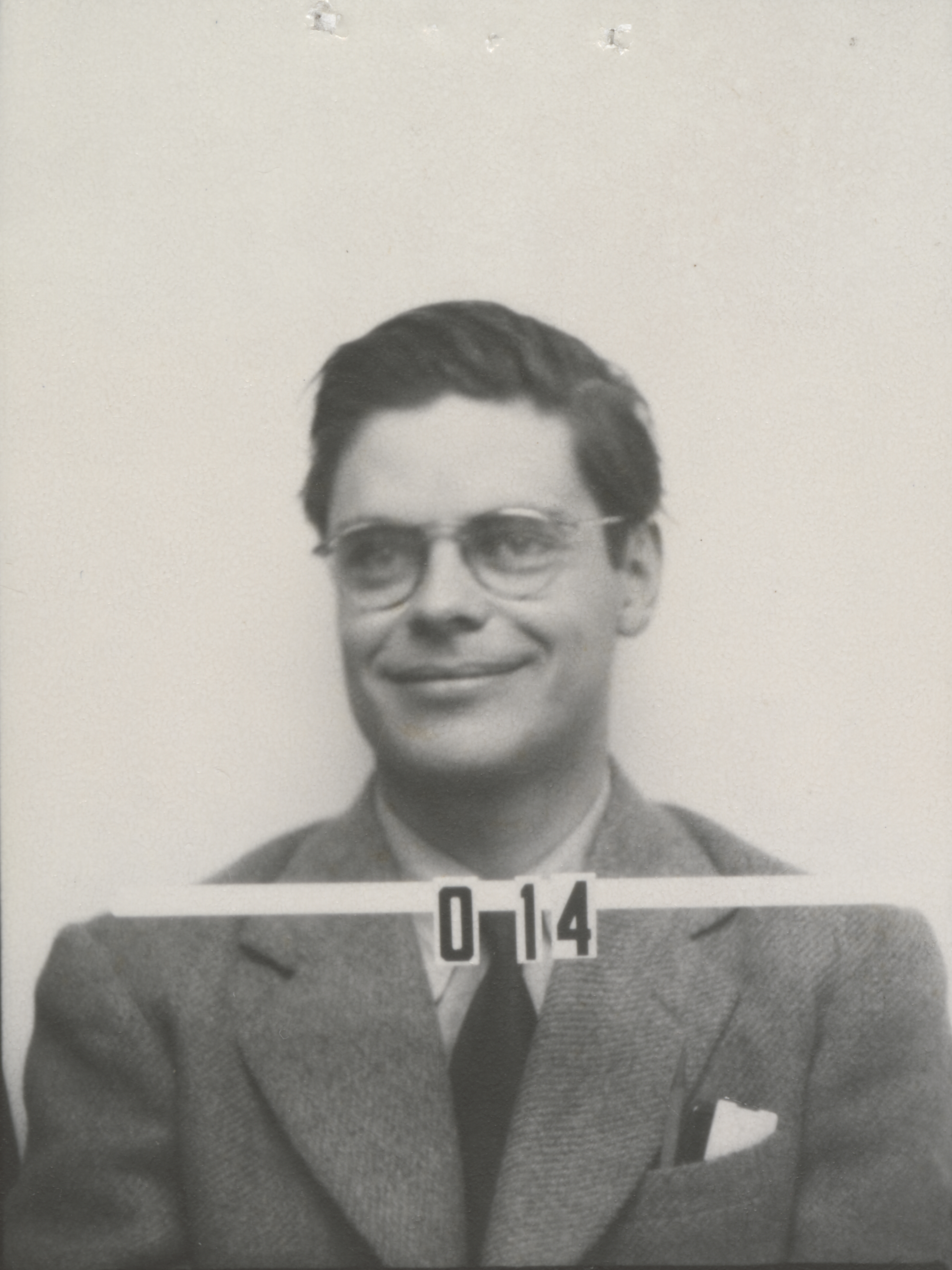
Robert R. Wilson's ID badge photo from Los Alamos

The work at Princeton was terminated during World War II when Oppenheimer's secret laboratory for research on the atomic bomb, the Manhattan Project's Los Alamos National Laboratory, opened in 1943. "Like a bunch of professional soldiers," Wilson later recalled, "we signed up, en masse, to go to Los Alamos."

Wilson moved there with some of his Princeton staff and Harvard University's cyclotron, and was appointed as head of the Cyclotron Group (R-1) by Oppenheimer. Only in his late twenties, he was the youngest group leader in the experimental division. The cyclotron would be used for measurements of the neutron cross section of plutonium.

When Oppenheimer reorganized the laboratory in August 1944 to focus on the development of an implosion-type nuclear weapon, Wilson became head of R (Research) Division. As such he had four groups reporting to him: the Cyclotron Group (R-1), still headed by himself; the Electrostatic Group (R-2), headed by John H. Williams; the D-D (Deuterium-Deuterium) Group (R-3), headed by John H. Manley; and the Radioactivity Group (R-4), headed by Emilio G. Segrè. In March 1945, R Division acquired the additional responsibility of developing instrumentation for the Trinity nuclear test in July 1945. Wilson helped stack boxes of explosives for the 100-ton test that preceded it. At Los Alamos, he was also active in community affairs, serving on the town council.

In May 1945, when Nazi Germany surrendered, and the initial motivation for the crash atomic bomb project dissipated as it was discovered that the German nuclear energy project was years behind, Wilson raised the question of whether they should continue with their work. News of this met with an icy reception from Major General Leslie Groves, director of the Manhattan Project. In later life, when interviewed in the Oscar-nominated documentary The Day After Trinity (1980), Wilson would say that he should have strongly considered ceasing work on the bomb after the surrender of Germany, and regretted not doing so to some extent. Richard Feynman recalled seeing Wilson sitting and moping on the morning right after the Trinity test as everyone celebrated and had parties. When asked why, Wilson told Feynman, "It's a terrible thing that we made."

After the atomic bombing of Hiroshima and Nagasaki, Wilson helped organize the Association of Los Alamos Scientists (ALAS), which called, with a scientists' petition, for the international control of atomic energy. The petition was carried by Oppenheimer to Washington, D.C., eventually making its way via Secretary of War Henry L. Stimson to President Harry S. Truman.

== Post-World War II ==
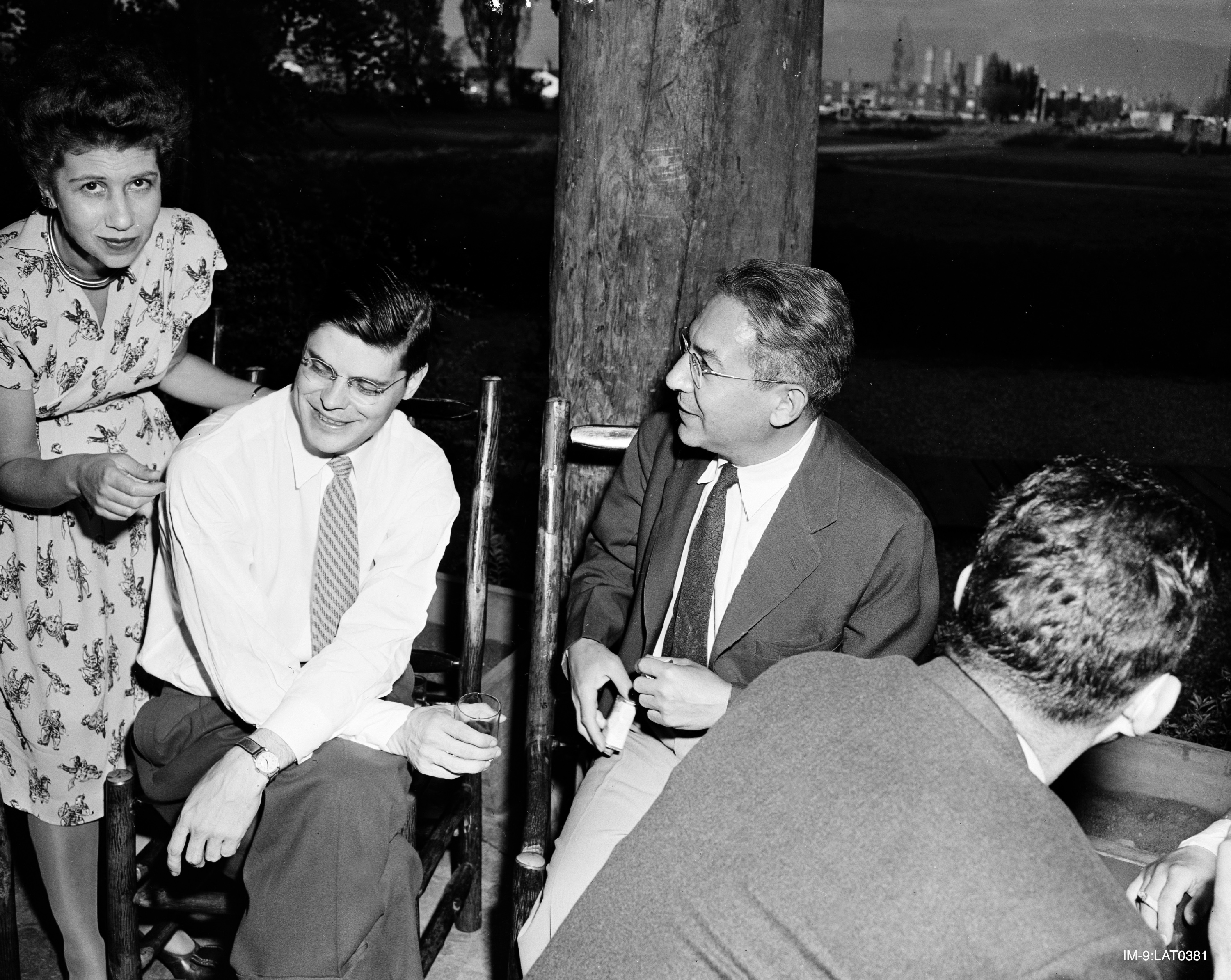
Jane and Robert Wilson with I. I. Rabi (c. 1950)

After the war, Wilson also helped form the Federation of American Scientists and served as its chairman in 1946. He accepted an appointment as an associate professor at Harvard, but spent the first eight months of 1946 at Berkeley designing a new 150 MeV cyclotron for Harvard to replace the one taken to Los Alamos. At Harvard, Wilson published a seminal paper, "Radiological Use of Fast Protons", which founded the field of proton therapy.

=== Cornell ===
In 1947 Wilson went to Cornell University as professor of physics and the director of its new Laboratory of Nuclear Studies. At Cornell, Wilson and his colleagues constructed four electron synchrotrons. The first, a 300 MeV synchrotron, was under construction when he arrived. In a 1948 report to the Office of Naval Research, he described their purpose:

The most important problems of nuclear physics, to our minds are: What are the elementary particles of which nuclei are made and what is the nature of the forces that hold these particles together? A more general but connected problem concerns the general expression of electrical laws at such high energies as will be produced by our synchrotron. Our experiments are planned to attack all three problems. Thus we hope to produce artificial mesons which are supposedly elementary particles and to study the interactions of these mesons with nuclei. Further, we shall explore the electrical interactions of high energy electrons with electrons and protons in search of evidence pointing to a correct theory of electricity at high energy.

Wilson initiated the construction of a 1.4 GeV synchrotron in 1952. As he had foreseen in 1948, it produced artificial K mesons and rho mesons, and tested quantum electrodynamics at short distances. The last machine he built at Cornell was a 12 GeV synchrotron that remains in use as an injector for the Cornell Electron Storage Ring (CESR), built between 1977 and 1999. It is located in what is now known as the Wilson Synchrotron Laboratory.

Wilson was one of the first physicists to use Monte Carlo methods, which he used to model electron and proton initiated particle showers. He invented the quantometer so that he could measure the intensity of high-energy X-ray beams.

=== Fermilab ===
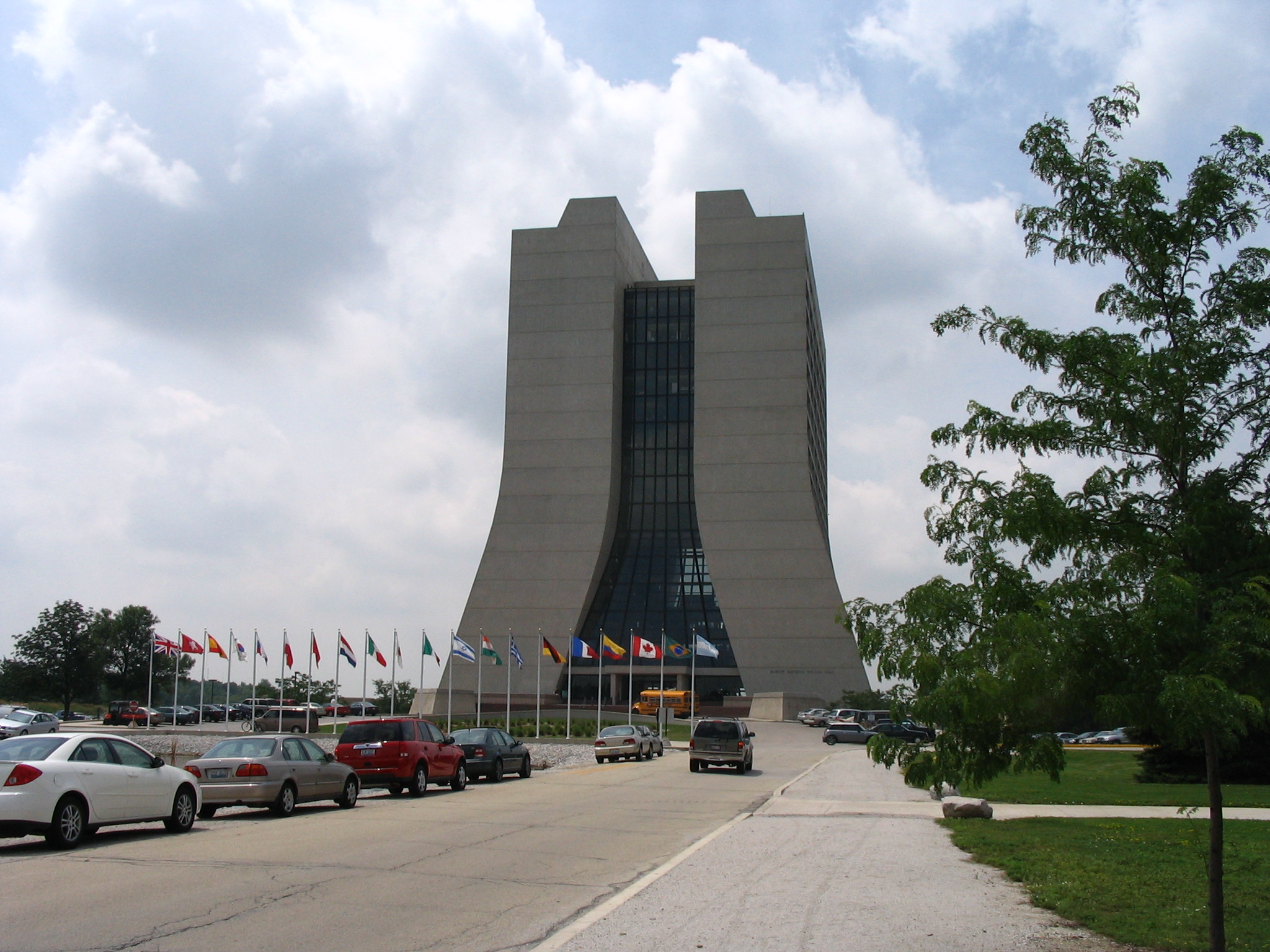
Wilson had a direct role in the aesthetic design of Fermi National Accelerator Laboratory. Shown here is Robert Rathbun Wilson Hall.

In 1967 he took a leave of absence from Cornell to assume directorship of the nascent National Accelerator Laboratory at Batavia, Illinois, which was to be the largest particle accelerator constructed until then (it was to remain so until the beginning of operation of the Large Electron-Positron Collider at CERN in 1989). In 1969, Wilson was called to justify the multimillion-dollar machine to the Congressional Joint Committee on Atomic Energy. Bucking the trend of the day, Wilson emphasized it had nothing at all to do with national security, rather:

It only has to do with the respect with which we regard one another, the dignity of men, our love of culture... It has to do with: Are we good painters, good sculptors, great poets? I mean all the things that we really venerate and honor in our country and are patriotic about. In that sense, this new knowledge has all to do with honor and country but it has nothing to do directly with defending our country except to help make it worth defending.

Thanks to Wilson's talented leadership, a management style very much adopted from Lawrence, the facility was completed on time and under budget. According to Wilson, he gave Atomic Energy Commission chairman Glenn T. Seaborg his assurance "signed in blood" that he would not exceed the authorized $250 million budget and "would rot in Hell" if he did. The facility centered on a four-mile circumference, 400 GeV accelerator. Wilson subsequently initiated the design of the Tevatron, a 1 TeV particle accelerator. The National Accelerator Laboratory, was renamed the Fermi National Accelerator Laboratory in 1974, after Enrico Fermi. It is frequently referred to as "Fermilab".

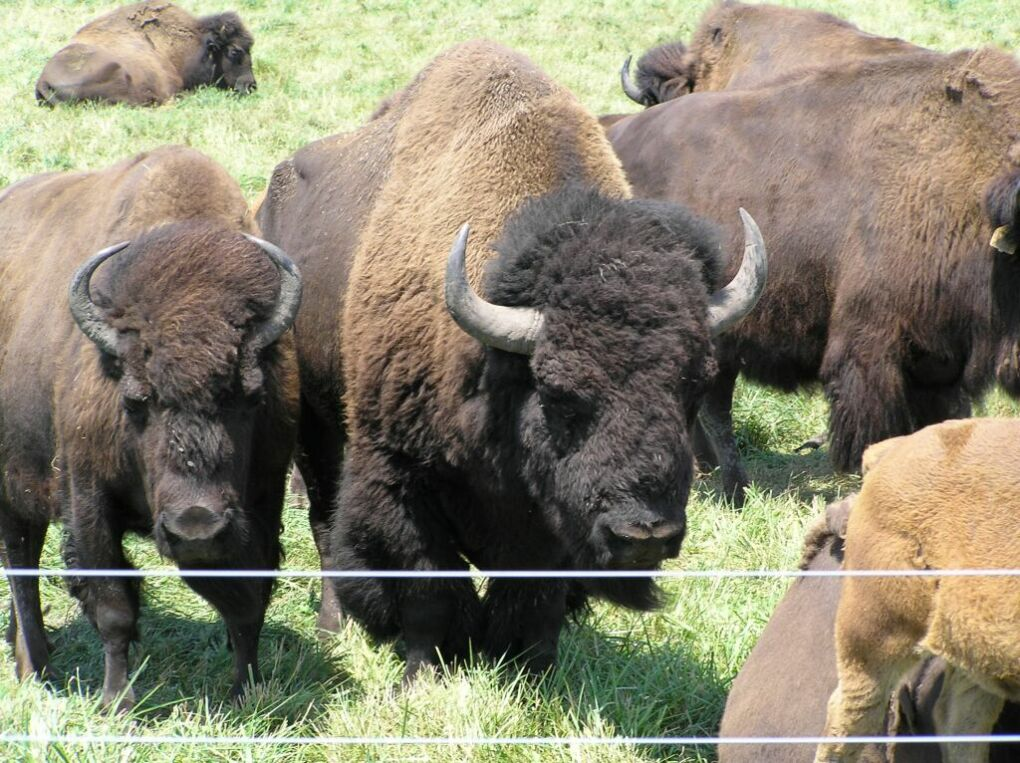
Bison graze on the prairie close to Fermi National Accelerator Laboratory

Wilson had studied sculpture at the Accademia di Belle Arti di Firenze in Italy while on sabbatical in 1961, and he wanted Fermilab to be an appealing place to work, believing that external harmony would encourage internal harmony as well, and labored personally to keep it from looking like a stereotypical "government lab", playing a key role in its design and architecture. Surrounding the facility was a restored prairie which served as a home to a herd of American Bison that started with Wilson bringing in a bull and four cows in 1969.

The site also had ponds, and a main building purposely reminiscent of the Beauvais Cathedral. Fermilab also celebrates his role as a sculptor, featuring several of his works, including "The Mobius Strip", "The Hyperbolic Obelisk", "Tractricious", and "Broken Symmetry". Another metal sculpture "Topological III" sits in the lobby of the Harvard Science Center. Fermilab's Central Laboratory building was named Robert Rathbun Wilson Hall in his honor in 1980.

Wilson served as the director of Fermilab until 1978, when he resigned in protest against what he considered was inadequate funding by the Federal government. He then joined the faculty of the University of Chicago as Ritzma Professor at the Enrico Fermi Institute. He became emeritus professor of physics at Chicago in 1980. He moved to Columbia University, where he became I. I. Rabi Visiting Professor of Science and Human Relations in 1979, Michael I. Pupin Professor of Physics in 1980, and emeritus professor in 1982. He retired in 1983 and moved back to Ithaca, NY.

== Awards and honors ==
Wilson received many awards and honors, including the Elliott Cresson Medal from the Franklin Institute in 1964, the National Medal of Science in 1973, and the Department of Energy's Enrico Fermi Award in 1984. He was elected to the National Academy of Sciences and the American Philosophical Society, and was president of the American Physical Society in 1985. In 1986, Wilson received the Golden Plate Award of the American Academy of Achievement.

== Death ==
Wilson suffered a stroke in 1999, from which he never recovered. He died on January 16, 2000, at the age of 85, at a nursing home in Ithaca, New York, and was buried at the 19th-century Pioneer Cemetery (established 1839) on the Fermilab site on Batavia Road near Fermilab Site 39. He was survived by his wife, Jane; his three sons, Daniel, Jonathan and Rand; and his sister, Mary Jane Greenhill. His papers are in the Cornell University Library.
