= Eliza Stewart Boyd =

First woman juror in America (1833–1912)

- Born: September 8, 1833; Crawford County, Pennsylvania
- Died: March 9, 1912 (aged 78); Laramie, Wyoming
- Known for: First female juror in the United States

Eliza Stewart Boyd (September 8, 1833 in Crawford County, Pennsylvania – March 9, 1912 in Laramie, Wyoming) was the first woman in America ever selected to serve on a jury.

In March 1870, her name was drawn from the voters’ roll to serve on the grand jury to be convened later that month. Soon after the grand jury was convened, five other Laramie women made history becoming the first women in the world to serve on a trial jury. The women on the grand jury and the trial jury were selected less than six months after Wyoming's first territorial legislature granted women equal political rights.

== Early life and education ==
Stewart was the eldest of eight children born to Aaron and Mary (McMichael) Stewart. Her maternal grandparents came from Scotland about 1797, settling in Pennsylvania. Her father was Scots Irish. Her mother died soon after the birth of the last child. Stewart took on the role of raising her seven younger siblings.

Despite the hardships involved in this endeavor, she continued to attend school—and excel. She graduated in 1861 from Washington Female Seminary in Washington, Pennsylvania as class valedictorian. Her valedictory address, ten typed pages of rhymed verse titled "Entering Service," was published in the newspaper in Meadville, Pennsylvania.

== Career ==
For the next eight years, she taught school in her native Crawford County. In the late winter of 1868, she moved West, arriving in Laramie, Wyoming on Dec. 16, 1868, just as the town was about to open its first public school. When it was learned she was a veteran teacher, she was hired—the first teacher in the Laramie public schools. First classes began in February 1869.

In August, 1869, the Rev. F. L. Arnold came to Laramie to organize the Presbyterian Church. Eliza Stewart was one of the charter members.

Shortly after that, she met Stephen Boyd, a machinist in the Union Pacific car repair shops who had come to Laramie before the first train arrived in 1868. Boyd, born in Canada, came to the United States and settled along the South Platte River near Denver before hiring on to the Union Pacific. Before her marriage Stewart received the call to serve on the grand jury. Stewart's unique position as the first woman selected gained some local fame. After jury service ended, Stewart returned to teaching.

== Marriage and later ==
Stephen Boyd and Eliza were married July 21, 1870, in Cheyenne.

Two months after her marriage, Eliza was named to the organizing committee for the Wyoming Literary and Library Association. She helped draft the constitution and became a charter member of the organization, one of the first in Wyoming to promote libraries and the arts. She also continued to write poetry.

In August 1873, Eliza became the first woman in Wyoming to be nominated to run for the Territorial legislature. For unknown reasons, she declined nomination, withdrawing her name from the ballot. (Some 37 years later, Laramie resident Mary Bellamy became the first woman elected to the Wyoming legislature, none having served in that body during the territorial period).

In November 1883, she was a charter member of the newly organized Women's Christian Temperance Union (WCTU) in Laramie, serving for many years as the organization's secretary. In the Prohibition Party's state convention in February 1888, she was selected as one of two Wyoming delegates to the party's national convention, held that June in Indianapolis.

In the winter of 1912, she read a paper at ceremonies opening Whiting School in Laramie.

== Death ==
In early March 1912, Eliza Stewart Boyd slipped on a patch of ice in front of her home and broke her hip. Within a week, the 79-year-old Boyd died.

Eliza Stewart Boyd is among the many women memorialized in the Women in the West Center, located on South Second Street, Laramie, a few blocks from where Boyd spent much of her life.
