= Larry Wilcox =

American actor and producer (born 1947)

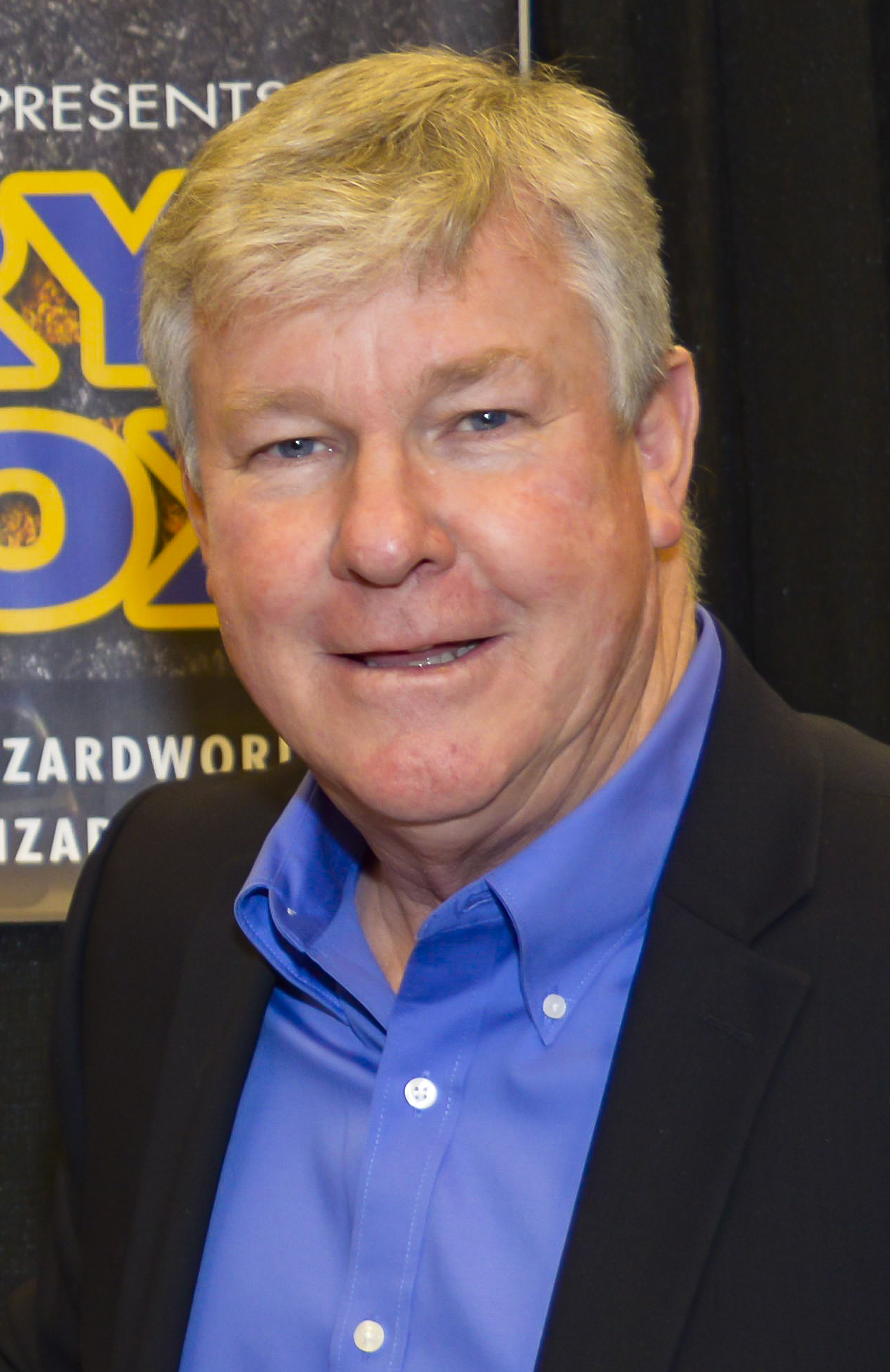
- Wilcox in 2016
- Born: August 5, 1947 (age 79); San Diego, California, U.S.
- Occupation: Actor
- Years active: 1971–present
- Spouses: Judy Vagner (m. 1969; div. 1978) Hannie Strasser (m. 1980; div. 1982) Marlene Harmon (m. 1986)
- Children: 5
- Military service
- Allegiance: United States
- Branch: United States Marine Corps Reserve
- Service years: 1967–1973
- Rank: Staff sergeant
- Battles: Vietnam War; Tet Offensive
- Website: larrywilcox.net

Larry Wilcox (born August 8, 1947) is an American actor best known for his role as California Highway Patrol officer Jon Baker in the television series CHiPs, which ran from 1977 to 1983 on NBC.

== Early life ==
Wilcox was born in San Diego, California, and raised in Rawlins, Wyoming. After taking drama classes at the University of Wyoming, he received a draft notice and immediately joined the United States Marine Corps Reserve to avoid being sent to the army. He served in the Vietnam War during the Tet Offensive as an artilleryman. While in Vietnam, he studied French and took general classes at College of the Desert during his final year in the Marines at the Air Ground Combat Center in Twentynine Palms, California. He was honorably discharged at the rank of staff sergeant in 1973.

== Career ==
=== Early years ===
Wilcox made a guest appearance in 1971 in Room 222. In 1973, Wilcox appeared in The Streets of San Francisco episode "The Runaways" as older brother George. Also in 1973, he starred in Lassie as Dale, one of the boys who grew up there and was now working as a hired hand. Wilcox appeared in an episode of Cannon "Target In The Mirror" in 1973 in a role as a witness. Larry played Moose Meyers in the rom-com, The Girl Most Likely To, starring Stockard Channing. He performed in the 1976 film The Last Hard Men, and other TV appearances including The Partridge Family, Hawaii Five-O, M*A*S*H, Fantasy Island, and Police Story, as well as commercials. He was the main (and only human for most of it) actor of a two-part show on The Wonderful World of Disney anthology show in 1978 playing a lone cowboy on a cattle drive and his adventures en route to market. He also played Emmett Dalton in the 1979 film The Last Ride of the Dalton Gang.

=== CHiPs ===
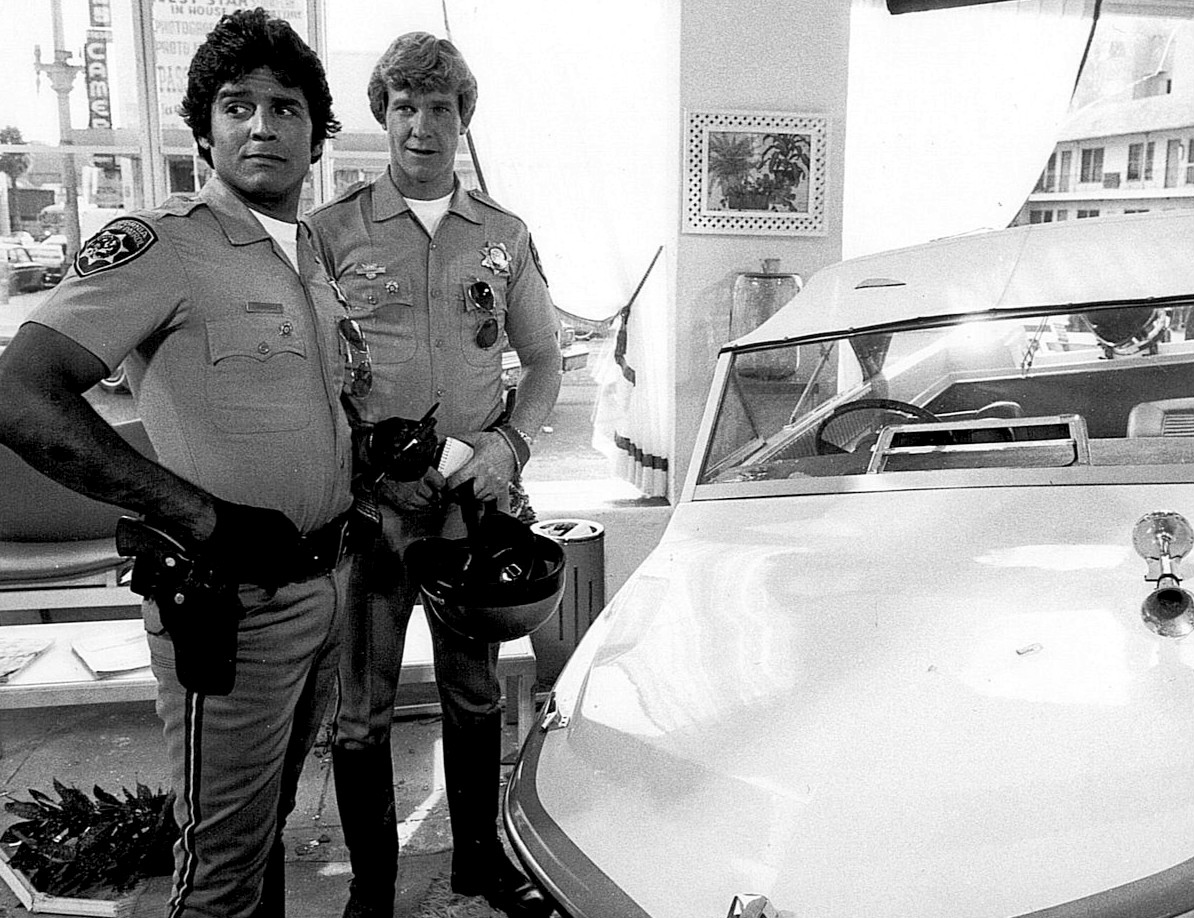
Wilcox and Erik Estrada on CHiPS in 1977

Wilcox was cast as Jon Baker, one of the lead characters on CHiPs; he did not appear in the show's sixth and final season. Wilcox performed many of his own stunts on the show. Unlike his co-star Erik Estrada, Wilcox never sustained any major injuries. By the 1979–80 season, he made $25,000 per episode (the same amount as Estrada) and it escalated thereafter. During his time on CHiPs, Wilcox appeared on the cover of TV Guide three times, along with Estrada.

Rumors of disagreements between Estrada and Wilcox occurred late in the 1978–79 season, but abated shortly thereafter. Wilcox confirmed the two had disagreed but said minor issues were blown out of proportion. He added: "We're just two totally different people". Wilcox later stated that Estrada was instrumental in having him fired prior to the show's final season but the two have since settled their differences and are now on friendly terms.

Wilcox is among the cast members who appeared at a CHiPs reunion in Los Angeles to celebrate the series's 35th anniversary. Wilcox filmed the event and helped raise money for police officers and for children at risk. Wilcox stated he called Estrada to invite him, as did Robert Pine, but Estrada did not return calls nor did he show up for the event. Estrada's manager said he was trying to establish a new and separate identity from CHiPs.

In 2023, the 45th anniversary of CHiPs, the Blue Angel Connect non-profit organization presented the Dinner with CHiPs fundraiser in Indianapolis on October 20–21. All proceeds benefited Blue Angel Connect and their annual Holiday Hope Christmas program. Both Wilcox and Estrada appeared.

=== After CHiPs ===
In 1982, Wilcox left CHiPs and formed his own production company, Wilcox Productions, which produced the award-winning TV series for HBO The Ray Bradbury Theater for five years. He developed, optioned, and sold The Yorkshire Ripper to Metro-Goldwyn-Mayer and sold The Wolfman Jack Story to Columbia Pictures. Later, Wilcox optioned Flipper and was the executive producer of that movie for Universal Pictures. He also continued acting and directing.

Wilcox works with Saratoga Entertainment which is a production and digital distribution company. He also is a consultant to Enabledware, which is a rule-based digital distribution software in 57 languages with a focus on digital universities and security for sports stadiums.

Wilcox was executive producer of the TV movie Death of a Centerfold: The Dorothy Stratten Story. The story had a deeper resonance for Wilcox, whose older sister was fatally shot in front of her three children, her mother, and 17 witnesses. The accused murderer, her husband, was later acquitted in a celebrated trial in Wyoming and subsequently killed in a barroom brawl, according to Wilcox.

Wilcox appeared in a 1985 made-for-TV movie sequel to The Dirty Dozen, called The Dirty Dozen: Next Mission. He played convicted war prisoner Tommy Wells, recruited to help kill a German general who is plotting to assassinate Hitler. In 1992, Wilcox appeared on MacGyver as an arms dealer who sells weapons to street gangs. Wilcox was reunited briefly on-screen with his former co-star Estrada in National Lampoon's Loaded Weapon 1, and then again in 1998, where he reprised his role of Jon Baker (now Captain Baker) in the Turner Network Television production of CHiPs '99. In 2008, Wilcox had a brief cameo in the music video for Rehab's song "Bartender Song (Sittin' at a Bar)" where he played a San Diego police sergeant.

Wilcox appeared in a cameo as himself dressed as Officer Jon Baker on the 2009 Christmas episode of 30 Rock. Wilcox also completed a cameo in the feature film Two Sillies. He made a brief appearance as mine owner Bob Freeman in the 2016 drama 94 Feet. He had a role on The Love Boat as Sergeant Belouski in Season 4, Episode 1.

In 2010, Wilcox was charged with securities fraud by the U.S. Securities and Exchange Commission (SEC), after being caught by undercover FBI agents in a penny stock kickback scheme. He pled guilty to securities fraud conspiracy and was sentenced to three years probation.

== Personal life ==
In 1966, Wilcox's sister Sharon was murdered in Wyoming by her husband, Joe Esquibel.

Wilcox married Hannie Strasse, a member of the CHIPs sound crew, in 1980. He has been married to Marlene Harmon Wilcox, a former world-class heptathlete, since 1986.

== Filmography ==
- The Great American Beauty Contest (1973)
- The Girl Most Likely To... (1973)
- Death Stalk (1975)
- Sky Heist (1975)
- The Last Hard Men (1976)
- Relentless (1977)
- The Last Ride of the Dalton Gang (1979)
- Deadly Lessons (1983)
- The Dirty Dozen: Next Mission (1985)
- Mission Manila (1988)
- National Lampoon's Loaded Weapon 1 (1993)
- The Thundering 8th (2000)
- 94 Feet (2016)
- Wish Man (2019)

== See also ==
- List of members of the American Legion
- List of people from San Diego
- List of people from Wyoming
- List of United States Marines
