= The Art of Flight =

- Film poster
- Directed by: Curt Morgan
- Produced by: Red Bull Media House & Brain Farm Digital Cinema
- Release date: September 8, 2011 (US)
- Countries: United States; Austria
- Language: English
- Budget: Approx. $2,000,000

The Art of Flight is a Red Bull-sponsored documentary film about snowboarding and a successor to That's It, That's All. Directed by Curt Morgan, it premiered in New York City on September 8, 2011, at the Beacon Theatre.

== Cast ==
- Travis Rice
- Mark Landvik
- John Jackson
- Nicolas Müller
- Scotty Lago
- Bjorn Leines
- David Carrier Porcheron "DCP"
- Jeremy Jones
- Pat Moore
- Eero Niemela
- Kyle Clancy
- Eric Willett
- Bode Merrill
- Jack Mitrani
- Luke Mitrani
- Mark McMorris
- Jake Blauvelt
- Lars "Koffer" Keser

== Production ==
The Art of Flight was shot over the course of two years from 2009 to 2011.

It was filmed using the RED camera system, the GoPro Hero, Vision Research's Phantom Gold high speed camera, Panasonic Varicam HPX3700, Arri 235 (4 perf 35mm), Cineflex HD (Sony HDC-1500) and Nikon and Canon SLRs for time lapses.

=== Locations ===
- Nelson, British Columbia, Canada
- Revelstoke, British Columbia
- Patagonia, Chile
- Alaska
- Jackson, Wyoming
- Aspen, Colorado

== Reception ==
Slant Magazine said, "even at 80 minutes, The Art of Flight feels severely empty, an aesthetic showcase whose repetitive nature winds up diminishing the excitement of its breathtaking feats of mountainous flight."

== Alternate version ==
The 3D version, "The Art of FLIGHT 3D", premiered at the San Sebastián Film Festival in Spain on September 28, 2012.

== Soundtrack ==
The Art of Flight soundtrack features songs by: The Naked and Famous, M83, Deadmau5, Sigur Rós, and others.
