= Jake Blauvelt =

American snowboarder

Jake Blauvelt (born 1986) is an American professional snowboarder.

== Early life ==
Blauvelt grew up in Waterbury Center, Vermont, and began snowboarding in fifth grade through an after-school program at Bolton Valley. He also rode at Stowe Mountain Resort.

== Professional snowboarding ==
He competed in slopestyle and halfpipe events during his teens and won the U.S. Open of Snowboarding Slopestyle in 2004 at age 17. After his early competitive success, he lived in Mammoth Lakes and Lake Tahoe before basing himself near Mt. Baker in Washington state, where he focused on powder and backcountry riding starting around age 20. He was named to Snowboarder Magazine's Top 10 Riders of the Year in 2009 and 2010. Blauvelt has been sponsored by Adidas, The North Face and Ride Snowboards.

== Personal life ==
He resides in Waterbury Center with his wife Kristin and their children. He hosts the annual Blauvelt's Banks Banked Slalom at Bolton Valley. He was a part of a coalition to bring a skatepark to Waterbury Center.

== Films ==
He appeared in films by Forum Snowboards and Absinthe Films, and released a solo project titled Naturally in the 2010/11 season. He also did a project. titled Full Circle. He has filmed in the Chilean Andes.

=== Credits ===
- Blitz! (2024)
- Liminal (2024)
- Atmosphere (2020)
- Full Circle (2018)
- Naturally (2013)
- The Art of Flight (2011)
- That's It, That's All (2008)
- Forum Or Against'em (2008)
- NowHere (2007–2008)
- That (2006)
- Derelicta (2005)
