= Dan Hausel =

American polymath

Dan Hausel (born 1949 in Salt Lake City, Utah, U.S.) a polymath of martial arts, geology, writing, astronomy, art, and public speaking. Hall-of-Fame 10th degree black belt grandmaster of Shorin-Ryu Karate and Kobudo, mineral exploration geologist who made several gold, colored gemstone, and diamond deposit discoveries in Alaska, Colorado, Montana and Wyoming, author of more than 600 publications including books, maps, professional papers and magazine articles, public speaker, artist, former astronomy lecturer for the Hansen Planetarium in Utah, and former rock musician.

== Martial arts ==
In 1999, Hausel developed a hybrid style of Okinawn Shorin-Ryu Karate and Kobudo that was recognized by Zen Kokusai Soke Budo Bugei Renmei (an international governing organization of martial arts grandmasters) as a legitimate martial art and was awarded Soke Shodai (1st generation grandmaster) of this art. He is a member of more than a dozen Halls-of-Fame including the North American Black Belt Hall of Fame, the World Martial Arts Black Belt Hall of Fame and others. In 2006, he left Wyoming for Gilbert, Arizona, where he and his wife reside.

Hausel was also recently honored in 1998 by induction into two hall of fames, honored as instructor of the year by two international associations

Hausel began training in martial arts in the 1960s at the Black Eagle Federation Kyokushin Kaikan Dojo.

== Geologist ==
While at the Wyoming Geological Survey on the University of Wyoming campus (1977–2006), Hausel discovered dozens of colored gemstone, diamond and gold deposits and occurrences. As a consultant for WestGold, a crew of six geologists including Hausel discovered the Donlin Creek gold deposit in Alaska in 1988; now recognized as one of the larger gold deposits discovered in North America in the last 100 years. He was inducted into the National Rock Hound and Lapidary Hall of Fame in 2001 for contributions to geological sciences and also presented the Prospectors and Developers Association of Canada's 2009 Thayer Lindsley Award for discovery of a major international gold deposit.

In addition to the Donlin Creek gold deposit he discovered the Rattlesnake Hills gold district in Wyoming in 1981 – a district with dozens of gold anomalies that is currently being explored and developed for both Kalgoorlie- and Cripple Creek-type gold deposits. He contributed to nearly one hundred books and 650 papers and maps on geological sciences and martial arts. Hausel is a diamond geology specialist and contributes to articles for the ICMJ Prospecting and Mining Journal.

== Books By Dan Hausel ==
- Gold: A Field Guide for Prospectors and Geologists.
- Gems, Minerals and Rocks of Wyoming: A Guide for Rock Hounds, Prospectors and Collectors.
- Diamond Deposits: Origin, Exploration and History of Discovery.
- Gemstones and Other Unique Minerals and Rocks of Wyoming: A Guide For Collectors.
- Exploration for Diamond-Bearing Kimberlites in Colorado and Wyoming: An Evaluation of Exploration Techniques.
- Ore Deposits of Wyoming.
- Geology and Gold Mineralization of the Rattlesnake Hills, Granite Mountains, Wyoming.
- Gold Districts of Wyoming.
- The Geology of Wyoming's Precious Metal Lode and Placer Deposits.
- Minerals and Rocks of Wyoming.
- Geological and Geophysical Investigations of Kimberlite in the Laramie Range, Southeastern, Wyoming.
- Economic Geology of the Copper Mountain Supracrustal Belt, Owl Creek Mountains, Wyoming.
- Economic Geology of the South Pass Granite-Greenstone Belt, Wind River Mountains, Wyoming.
- Economic Geology of the Seminoe Mountains Mining District, Wyoming.
- Geology of Wyoming's Copper, Lead, Zinc, Molybdenum and Associated Metal Deposits.
- Diamonds and Mantle Source Rocks in the Wyoming Craton with Discussions on Other U.S. Occurrences.
- Geology of the Iron Mountain Kimberlite District.
- Geology and Geochemistry of the Leucite Hills Volcanic Field.
