= Frontier, Wyoming =

- Unincorporated community
- Location within Wyoming Location within the United States
- Coordinates: 41°48′51″N 110°32′14″W
- Country: United States
- State: Wyoming
- County: Lincoln
- Elevation: 6,932 ft (2,113 m)
- Time zone: UTC-7 (Mountain (MST))
  - Summer (DST): UTC-6 (MDT)
- ZIP codes: 83121
- Area code: 307
- GNIS feature ID: 1588764

Frontier (also North Kemmerer) is an unincorporated community in southern Lincoln County, Wyoming, United States. It lies just north of the city of Kemmerer, the county seat of Lincoln County. Its elevation is 6,932 feet (2,113 m). Although Frontier is unincorporated, it had a post office, with the ZIP code of 83121 which closed in 2011.
