= Bryan Iguchi =

American snowboarder (born 1973)

- Born: 1973 (age 52–53); Los Angeles, California, U.S.
- Other names: Guch
- Occupation: Snowboarding
- Years active: 1991–present

Bryan Iguchi (born 1973) is a professional snowboarder. He is of half-Japanese ancestry.

Born in Los Angeles, California, he has been snowboarding for more than 30 years and his nickname is "Guch". He learned to snowboard at Mountain High and Big Bear mountains in southern California but since the late 1990s has been living in Jackson Hole in Wyoming. He chose Jackson over other resorts because of the terrain and the small community.

Iguchi’s accomplishments in snowboarding include a second-place win in the World Half Pipe Championships in 1992, X Games bronze medallist in 1997, and numerous segments in widely distributed snowboarding films.

Iguchi has had some of his artwork presented at public exhibitions.
