= Mary Bellamy =

American politician (1861–1955)

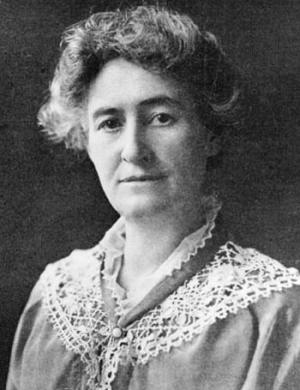

Member of the Wyoming House of Representatives from Albany County
- In office 1911–1913
- In office 1919–1921

Personal details
- Born: Mary Godat; December 13, 1861 Richwoods, Missouri, U.S.
- Died: January 28, 1955 (aged 93) Laramie, Wyoming, U.S.
- Party: Democratic
- Spouse: Charles Bellamy
- Children: 3
- Parents: Charles Godat (father); Catherine Horine (mother)

Mary Godat Bellamy (December 13, 1861 – January 28, 1955) was an American teacher, politician, and suffragist who served as the first female member of the Wyoming House of Representatives.

== Early life ==
Mary Godat Bellamy was born on December 13, 1861, in Richwoods, Missouri, to Charles Godat and Catherine Horine. Following her father's death her family moved to Galena, Illinois and later to Laramie, Wyoming Territory in 1873. She attended Laramie High School and was a member of its first graduating class.

In 1878, she became a teacher and worked in Tybo, Nevada. In 1886, she married Charles Bellamy and later had three children with him (Benjamin Charles, Fulton Dodd). In 1895, she and her family moved to Cheyenne, Wyoming.

== Career ==
=== Politics ===
In 1888, she ran for Laramie County Superintendent of Schools and was later elected to that position in 1902. During the 1916 presidential election she served as a Democratic delegate to the state and national conventions.

=== House of Representatives ===
During the 1910 elections Bellamy was given the Democratic nomination to run for a seat in the state House of Representatives from Albany County and won alongside four other Democrats. She was the first woman in Wyoming to serve in the Wyoming state legislature and the fifth nationally after four women who had served in the Colorado state legislature.

Following the death of Associate Justice John Marshall Harlan, Bellamy attempted to start a movement to have President William Howard Taft appoint a woman to replace him.

In 1912, she chose to not seek reelection and did not run in the 1914 or 1916 elections. In 1918, she ran for a seat in the state House of Representatives with the Democratic nomination and won. During her tenure she voted in favor of the 18th Amendment which established the prohibition of alcohol in the United States.

== Later life ==
On June 2, 1952, the University of Wyoming gave her an honorary doctor of law degree. On January 28, 1955, she died in Ivinson Memorial Hospital, in Laramie, Wyoming. On January 31, the four female members of the 33rd session of the Wyoming state legislature wrote a memorial for Bellamy that was read by Edness Kimball Wilkins on February 2.
