= Nicolas Müller =

Swiss snowboarder

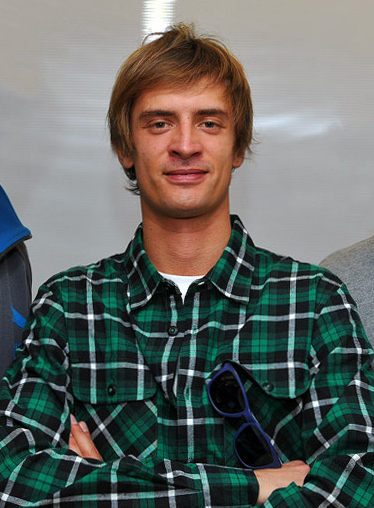
Nicolas Müller in Moscow on 16 October 2009

Nicolas Müller (born 25 April 1982 in Switzerland) is a Swiss snowboarder noted for his smooth riding style and his ability to read different terrains and adjusting his riding to the terrain. Muller's distinguished career and ability has led many critics and riders to hail him as one of the greatest snowboarders of all time. Muller has been voted TransWorld Snowboarding's Rider of the Year on two occasions and was also Snowboarder Magazine's Rider of the Year in 2013.

Müller grew up in the small town of Aarau, west of Zurich. He began skiing at an early age. He would skateboard in the summer which prompted him to move away from skiing and try out snowboarding - as he felt snowboarding was better suited to complement his skateboarding. Müller spent a lot of time at the nearby winter resort of Laax.

One of Müller's earlier attempts at competitive snowboarding came in 1999, when he entered the Chiquita quarter pipe competition in Arosa. He won a cash price of 40.000 francs.

2005 brought Müller to the attention of the mainstream as he was voted TransWorld Snowboarder of the Year. Since then he has appeared in numerous snowboard videos and has placed in some of the largest snowboard competitions of the world - having placed first in the TTR O'Neill Evolution Quarter Pipe and the TTR 4 star Popcorn Snickers Classic Wallride, in 2007.

In 2012, Nicolas Muller won a Winter X Games gold medal in the Real Snow Backcountry contest, which combines backcountry riding with freestyle skills.

In 2020, Müller posted various theories on social media to his more than 200,000 followers, among others about Bill Gates, being behind the worldwide coronavirus pandemic, or Freemasons wanting to infiltrate governments and thus create a new world order, about with the mobile phone standard 5G, and that the US multi-billionaire George Soros is the sponsor of a "race war". In the same year, his clothing supplier "Thirty Two" and his long-time snowboard sponsor "Gnu" parted ways with him without giving reasons. The sunglasses manufacturer Oakley Inc. also terminated its cooperation with Müller.

Nicolas Müller is co-founder of AlpenPionier AG, which wants to resettle hemp as a useful plant in the Alps in order to produce food from it.
