= Scranton (disambiguation) =

Scranton is a city in Pennsylvania, United States.

Scranton may also refer to:

== Places ==
=== United States ===
- Lake Scranton, a reservoir next to Scranton, Pennsylvania
- Scranton, Arkansas, a city
- Scranton, Iowa, a city
- Scranton, Kansas, a city
- Scranton, Kentucky, an unincorporated community
- Scranton, Mississippi, a former city merged with Pascagoula, Mississippi
- Scranton, North Dakota, a city
- Scranton, South Carolina, a town
- Scranton, New York, an unincorporated hamlet
- Scranton, Utah, a ghost town

== People ==
- Deborah Scranton, American documentarian
- George W. Scranton (1811–1861), American iron tycoon and U.S. Representative for Pennsylvania
- Jim Scranton (born 1960), American former professional baseball player
- Joseph A. Scranton (1838–1908), U.S. Representative for Pennsylvania
- Mary Scranton (1918–2015), former First Lady of Pennsylvania
- Mary F. Scranton (1832–1909), Methodist Episcopal Church missionary, the first female missionary in Korea, and the founder of the Ewha Girls School there
- Nancy Scranton (born 1961), American professional golfer
- Paul Scranton (born 1944), American professional basketball player for the ABA's Anaheim Amigos
- William Scranton (1917–2013), former Pennsylvania Governor and 1964 US presidential candidate
- William B. Scranton (1856–1922), Methodist Episcopal Church missionary to Korea, son of Mary F. Scranton
- William Scranton, III (born 1947), former Pennsylvania Lieutenant Governor, son of William Scranton
- William Walker Scranton (1844–1916), Pennsylvania businessman

== Other uses ==
- The University of Scranton, a Jesuit university located in Scranton, Pennsylvania
- USS Scranton, four ships of the United States Navy
- The Scranton Declaration, an important document in the development of craft unionism
- Roman Catholic Diocese of Scranton, an organizational division of the Catholic Church centered in Scranton, Pennsylvania
- Scranton (NJT station), the proposed terminus for New Jersey Transit passenger rail service from New York City and Hoboken to Scranton, Pennsylvania
- Union of Scranton, an intercommunion agreement among Christian denominations

== See also ==
- Scranton High School (disambiguation)
