= William Scranton (disambiguation) =

William Scranton (1917–2013) was an American politician who served as Governor of Pennsylvania 1963 to 1967

William Scranton may also refer to:

- William Scranton III (born 1947), American politician who served as Lieutenant Governor of Pennsylvania from 1979 to 1987
- William B. Scranton (1856–1922), American physician and Methodist missionary in Korea
- William Walker Scranton (1844–1916), American businessman
