= Scranton family =

Prominent Pennsylvania business and political family

The Scrantons are a family prominent in the business and political history of Pennsylvania:

- George W. Scranton (1811–1861), United States Congressman, 1859–1861
- Joseph A. Scranton (1838–1908), United States Congressman, 1881–1887, 1889–1891 and 1893–1897
- William Walker Scranton (1844–1916), president and manager of the Lackawanna Iron and Coal Company
- Worthington Scranton (1876–1955), president, Scranton Gas and Water Company
- Marion Margery Scranton (1884–1960), Pennsylvania Republican Committee Member, 1922–1934; Republican National Committee Member, 1928–1940; Vice Chair of the Republican National Committee, 1937; delegate to the Republican National Convention, 1940, 1944, 1948 Granddaughter-in-law of Joseph A. Scranton
- William Warren Scranton (1917–2013), Governor of Pennsylvania, 1963–1967; United States Ambassador to the United Nations, 1976–1977; candidate for Republican nomination for President of the United States, 1964. Grandson of William Walker Scranton
- William Scranton III (born 1947) lieutenant governor of Pennsylvania, 1979–1987; candidate for Governor of Pennsylvania, 1986; candidate for Republican nomination for Governor of Pennsylvania, 2006. Son of William Warren Scranton

== See also ==
- List of United States political families
- Scranton Area Community Foundation

== Gallery ==
Images of Scranton family members:

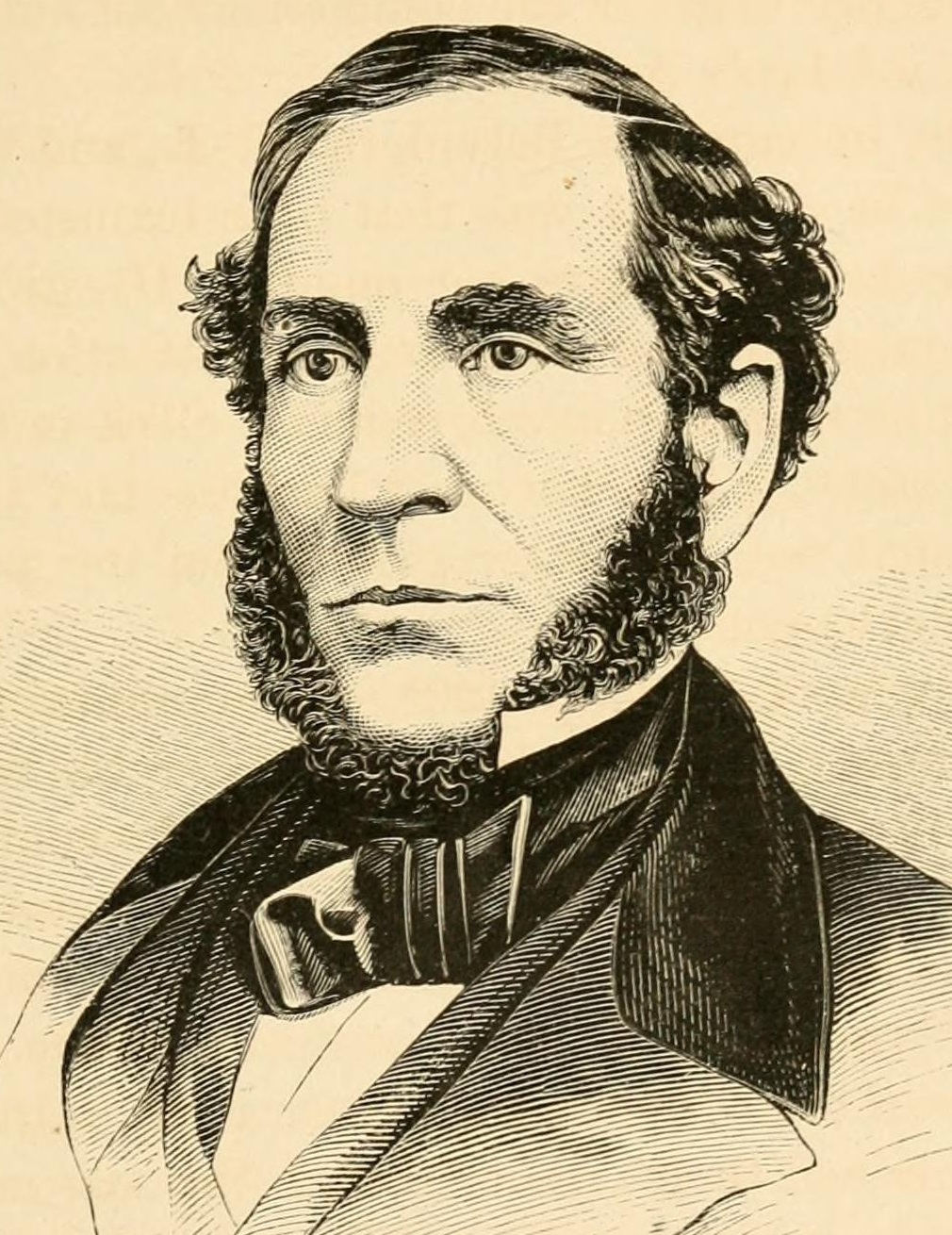
George Whitfield Scranton (1811–1861)

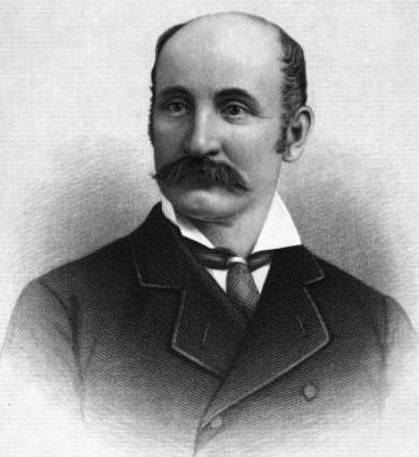
Joseph Augustine Scranton (1838–1908)

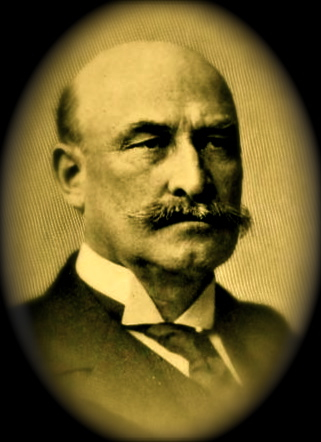
William Walker Scranton (1844–1916)

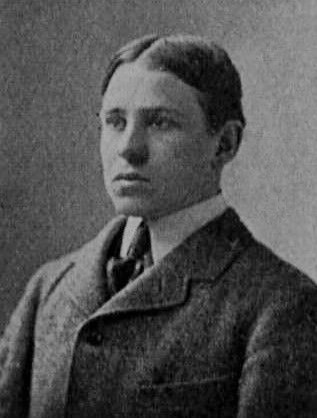
Worthington Scranton (1876–1955)

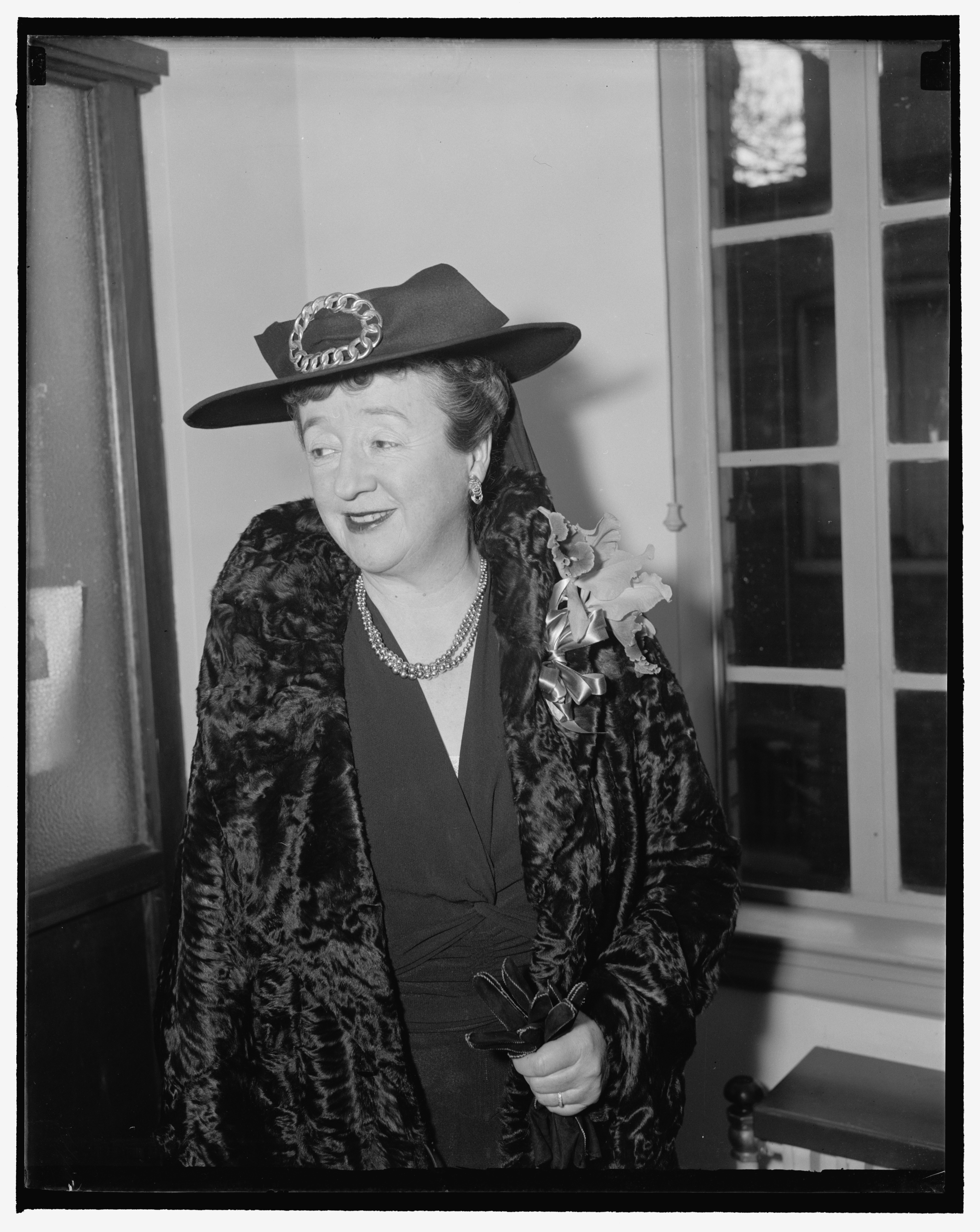
Marion Margery (Warren) Scranton (1884–1960)

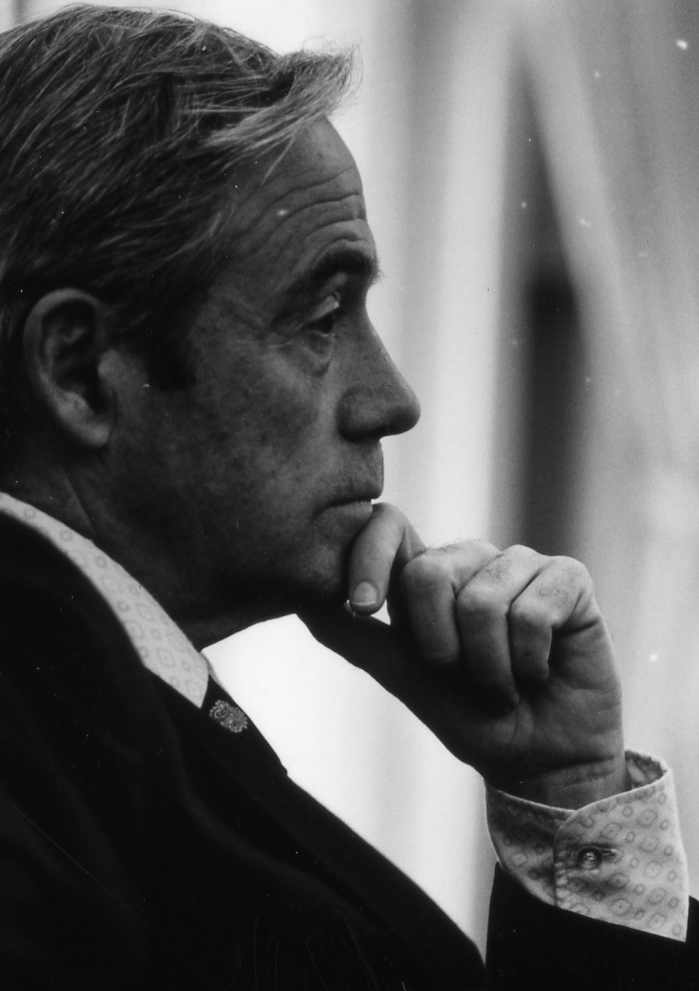
Governor William Warren Scranton (1917–2013)

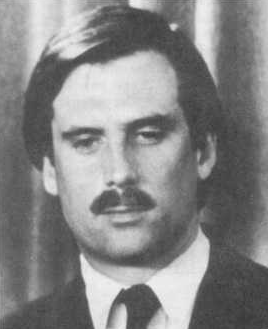
Lieutenant Governor William Worthington Scranton III (born 1947)

Images of the estate of Worthington and Marion Margery Scranton, Hobe Sound, Florida, 1942:

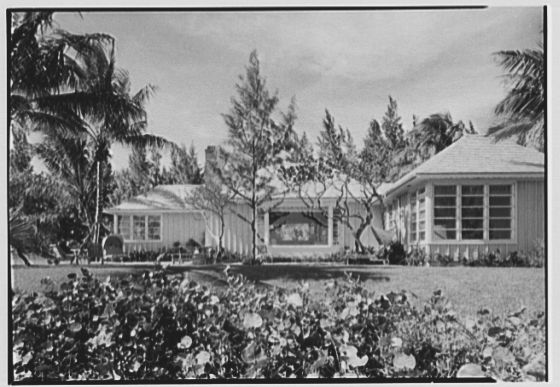
Scranton estate house, view from the beach

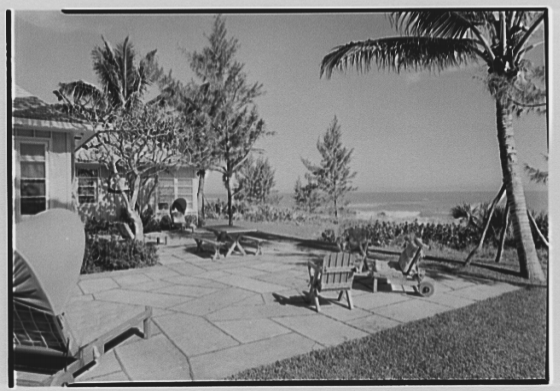
Patio overlooking beach

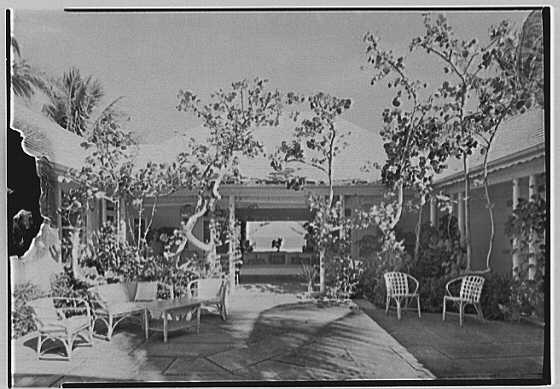
Patio view of ocean

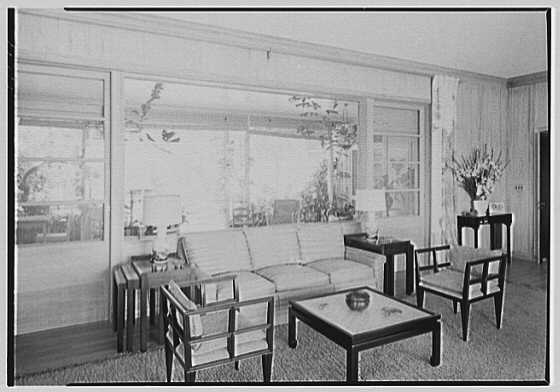
Living room view of patio window

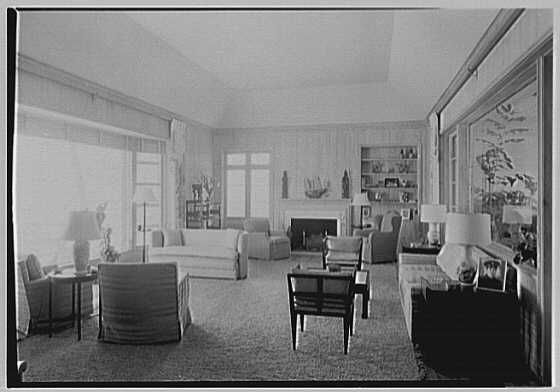
Living room, fireplace view

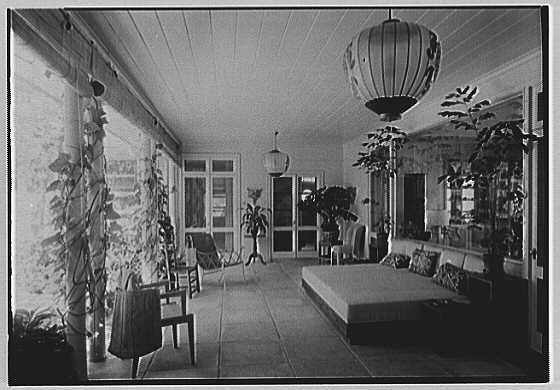
West loggia

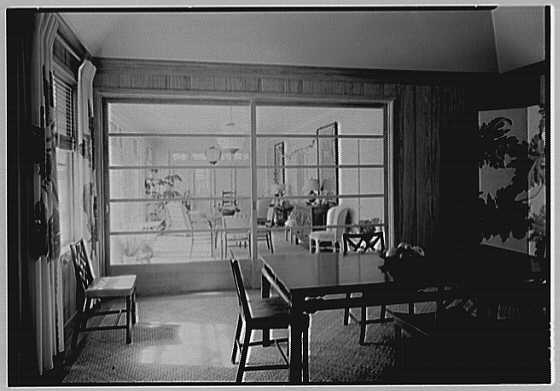
Dining room, view to loggia

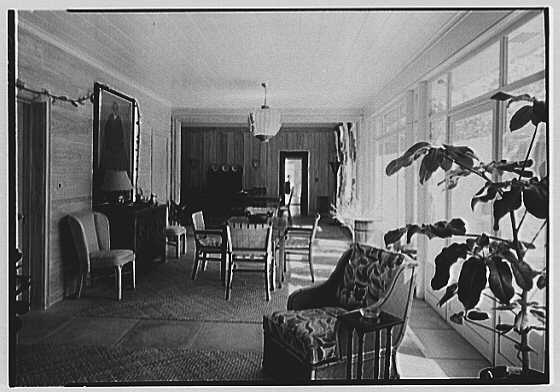
North loggia
