= Marion Margery Scranton =

American politician

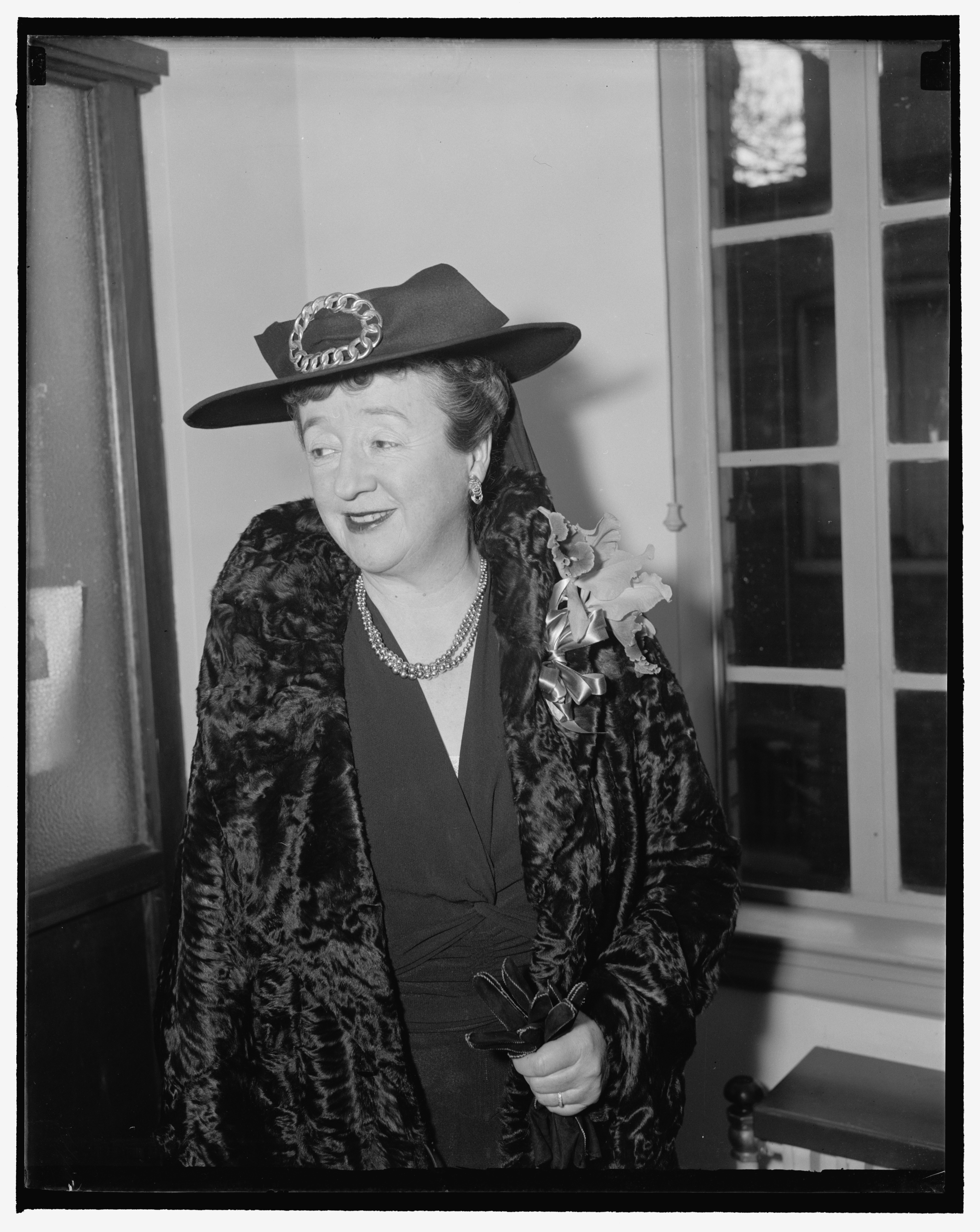
- Born: Marion Margery Warren; April 2, 1884; Scranton, Pennsylvania
- Died: June 23, 1960 (aged 76); Dalton, Pennsylvania
- Occupations: Suffragette and vice-chair, U.S. Republican Party
- Spouse: Worthington Scranton (1876–1955)
- Parent(s): Everett Warren (1859–1916) and Ellen Hower (Willard) Warren (1861–1949)

Marion Margery Warren Scranton (April 2, 1884 – June 23, 1960) was a 20th-century women’s suffrage activist and leading member of the Republican Party in the United States. Known as “the Duchess and the Grand Old Dame of the Grand Old Party,” she was described in Life magazine as “the woman Pennsylvania politicians still remember as ‘Margery,’ and ... the only woman who (in Tom Dewey’s much-quoted phrase) could wear two orchids through a coal mine and get away with it.”

The first female vice-chair of the Lackawanna County Republican Committee, Margery Scranton was also a member of the Pennsylvania Republican State Committee from 1922 to 1934, and served as vice-chair of the Pennsylvania Republican Party from 1926 to 1928. A Pennsylvania delegate to the Republican National Convention in 1928, 1932, 1936, 1940, 1944, and 1948, she was also a Pennsylvania representative to the Republican National Committee from 1928 to 1951—during which time she served as that national committee’s vice-chair from 1936 to 1938.

In 1954, she and her husband, Worthington Scranton, contributed one million dollars to establish the Scranton Foundation (now the Scranton Area Community Foundation), which was launched to support charitable and educational organizations in the city of Scranton.

== Formative years and family ==
Born on April 12, 1884, in Scranton, Pennsylvania, as Marion Margery Warren, Margery Scranton was a Mayflower descendant, who was a daughter of Everett Warren (1859–1916) and Ellen Hower (Willard) Warren (1861–1949), and the sister of Dorothy Josephine (Warren) Cowdrey (1887–1971) and Edward Willard Warren (1895–1974).

She was educated at Miss Porter’s School in Farmington, Connecticut, graduating in 1903.

On April 12, 1907, she married Worthington Scranton, who was the son of William Walker Scranton and who would go on to become president of the Scranton Gas and Water Company. They had four children: Marion M. (Scranton) Isaacs (1908–1992), Katherine (Scranton) Rozendaal (1910–2002), Sara (Scranton) Linen (1913–1997), and William Warren Scranton (1917–2013). Her daughters went on to attend Smith College in Northampton, Massachusetts, while her son, William, who was born at a cottage in Madison, Connecticut, while the family was vacationing there in 1917, graduated from Yale University before securing a position with the U.S. State Department in 1959 under President Dwight D. Eisenhower. In 1960, her son won a seat in the U.S. Congress before winning Pennsylvania’s gubernatorial race in 1962. He was inaugurated as the 38th Governor of Pennsylvania on January 15, 1963.

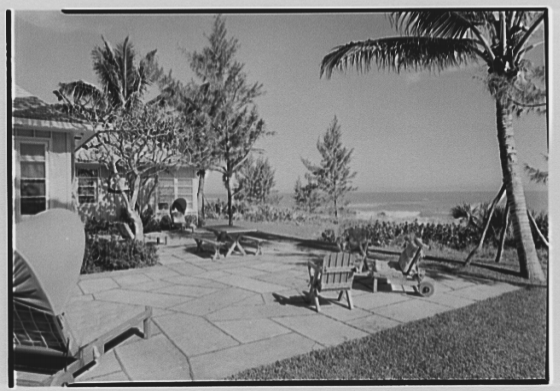
Residence of Worthington and Marion Margery Scranton, Hobe Sound, Florida, 1942.

Initially, Margery Scranton and her husband, Worthington, resided at the home built between 1867 and 1871 by her husband's grandfather, Joseph Hand Scranton. A 25-room mansion, the home and its grounds had been inherited by Joseph Scranton's son, William W. Scranton, when Joseph died in 1872, and by William's son and Margery's husband, Worthington, after the death of his mother in 1935. But by 1941, when she and her family were spending more and more time at Marworth, their own home in Dalton, Pennsylvania, they decided to move out of the old Scranton estate entirely and donate it to "Bishop William J. Hafey for use by the University of Scranton," according to the University of Scranton, stating that "the Estate would be 'most advantageously used for the development of an institution of higher learning so that the youth of this vicinity can get an education at a reasonable cost.'"

Marworth was located roughly eight miles north of Scranton. In 1981, ground was broken for a new alcohol and drug rehabilitation center to be operated by the Geisinger Medical Management Corporation on the grounds at the Marworth estate. She and her family also spent their winters at their estate in Hobe Sound, Florida.

== Political activities and women’s suffrage advocacy ==
Marion Margery Scranton became active in the women’s suffrage movement at the age of 16, and continued her advocacy and lobbying efforts until the Nineteenth Amendment to the United States Constitution was adopted in 1920. Also according to her son, Gov. William Scranton:

“She did everything she could … to get women’s suffrage, until it became a reality in 1920. Then she helped organize the Pennsylvania Council of Republican Women, which [was] the first women’s political organization.”

"Scranton was decidedly not the town that time forgot" during the major push for women's voting rights in America, according to journalist Angela Bonavoglia. "It was a state leader in the fight, in large measure because of the 'grit, courage and determination' of its people—especially its women." Women of Scranton became "'street orators'," who "preached women’s suffrage from the sideboards of model T Fords," and "climbed up onto stages at local movie houses to rally for the vote," or took part in marches as "flags waved, horns honked, crowds cheered." In 1914, "the Pennsylvania Woman Suffrage Association chose Scranton, then the third largest city in the state, as the site for its 46th annual convention."

During World War I, Margery Scranton chaired three Liberty bond drives in Scranton. The first female vice-chair of the Lackawanna County Republican Committee, she was also a member of the Pennsylvania Republican State Committee from 1922 to 1934, vice-chair of the Pennsylvania Republican Party from 1926 to 1928, a Pennsylvania delegate to the Republican National Convention from in 1928, 1932, 1936, 1940, 1944, and 1948, a Pennsylvania representative to the Republican National Committee from 1928 to 1951, and the vice-chair of the Republican National Committee from 1936 to 1938.

In addition, she lobbied the Pennsylvania Legislature, during the 1920s and 1930s, for financial support for the Mothers’ Assistance Fund.

According to her son, Gov. William W. Scranton:

“Mother was one of the first women to do a number of things. She was one of the first women to drive a car….

Mother was all over the Commonwealth all the time, primarily because she was so interested in, first, trying to get women into politics and, second, legislation that would be helpful to women. She was not a rabid feminist, though. In 1900, at sixteen years old, she wanted to go to Harrisburg to picket the state legislature for women’s suffrage. Her father, who was a very good lawyer, let her go. This was during the day when no young girl went anywhere without a chaperone….

She eventually became vice chairman of the Republican National Committee, and she traveled all over the country.”

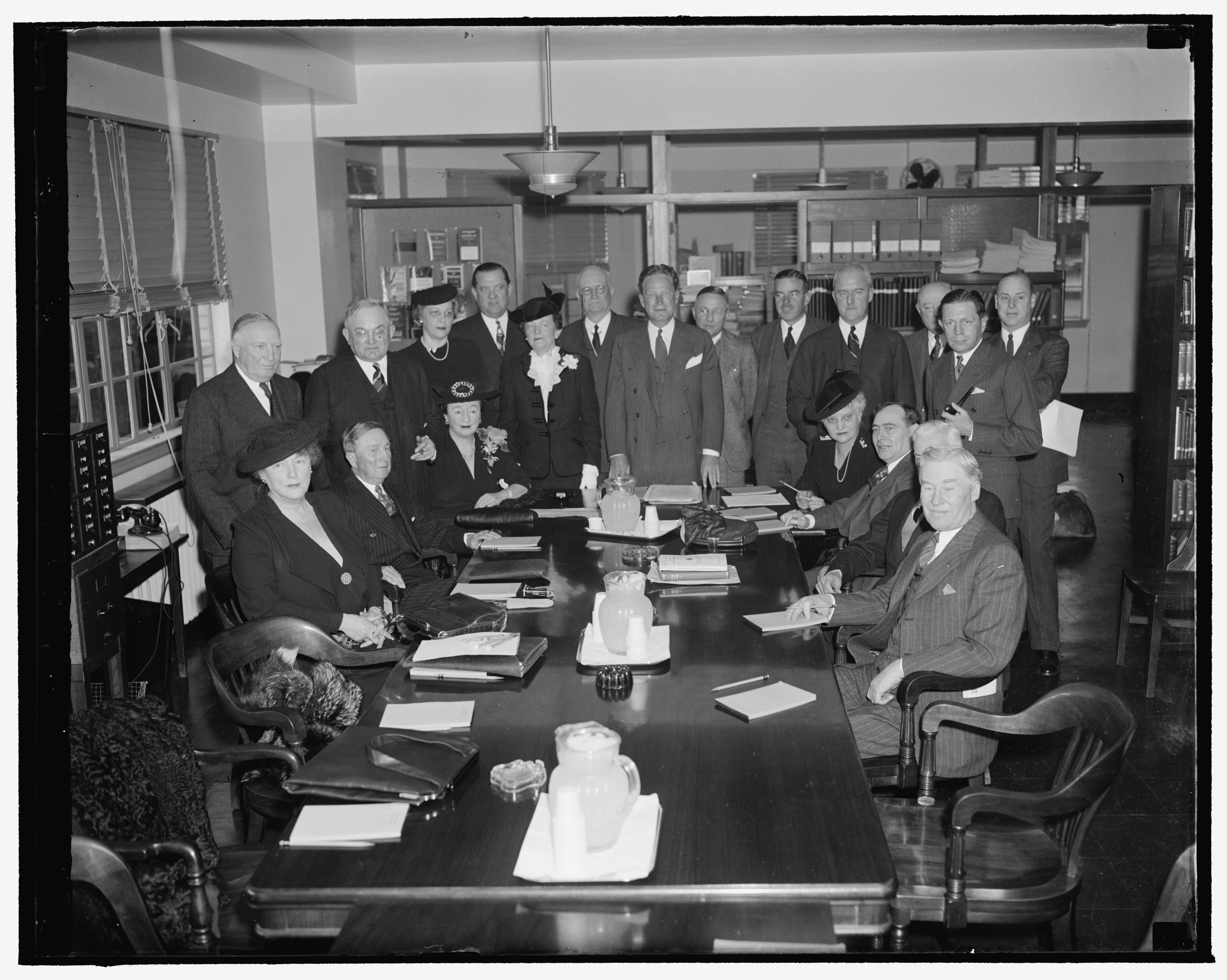
Margery Scranton, seated third from left, met with other members of the Executive Committee of the Republican National Committee to discuss presidential campaign issues, Washington, D.C., Dec. 7, 1939.

It was also during this phase of her political career that she was appointed by Pennsylvania Governor John Stuchell Fisher to serve on the Pennsylvania State Employees’ Retirement Board. As vice-chair of the Executive Committee of the Republican National Committee, she subsequently met with other committee members in Washington, D.C., on December 7, 1939, to discuss presidential campaign and deficit problems, as well as the possibility of holding a later national convention and shorter presidential campaign in 1940.

Later, during World War II, she was appointed to the Pennsylvania State Council of Defense by Pennsylvania Governor Edward Martin, and served as the council’s only female member from January 1943 until the end of the war. Also appointed by Martin as Commander of Civilian War Services, she was awarded “the first service bars given in the State for activity in aiding the war effort,” according to The Scranton Tribune, which noted that “she had a staff of 14 persons to carry out her orders.”

In 1952, according to her son, William, “she decided she had to get out,” and completely ended her advocacy work:

“She had been there long enough and so she left—she never did another thing politically. When she quit politics, she destroyed all of the files, the pictures, the documents, the correspondence, everything. The only thing we have left of my mother’s political career is a line-a-day diary.”

== Civic, philanthropic, and social affiliations ==
According to the Scranton Tribune, Margery Scranton was also active in multiple civic and social organizations, including the:

- American Legion Auxiliary
- Business and Professional Women’s Club
- Colonial Dames
- Country Club of Scranton (first chair, Current Events Department, 1911–1917)
- Daughters of 1812
- Daughters of the American Revolution
- Daughters of New England Women

In 1954, she and her husband, Worthington Scranton, donated one million dollars to establish the Scranton Foundation (now the Scranton Area Community Foundation), which was launched to support charitable and educational organizations in the city of Scranton. According to The Plain Speaker, at the time of the foundation's creation, she "made it clear it was named after the city, not the donors." By 2020, leaders of the foundation were overseeing more than 210 charitable funds with more than $44 million in assets, and were also distributing more than $1 million annually via grants and scholarships.

== Death and interment ==
Preceded in death by her husband in 1955, she continued to reside at Marworth, her family’s estate in Dalton, Pennsylvania, and died there from a heart ailment on June 23, 1960. She was interred at the Scranton Mausoleum at the Dunmore Cemetery in Lackawanna County, Pennsylvania.

== See also ==
- Women's suffrage in Pennsylvania
- National American Woman Suffrage Association
- Scranton family
