= Worthington Smith (disambiguation) =

Worthington Smith may refer to:

- Worthington Curtis Smith (1823–1894), American politician
- Worthington George Smith (1835–1917), English mycologist and archaeologist
