= Joseph L. Carrigg =

American politician

Joseph Leonard Carrigg
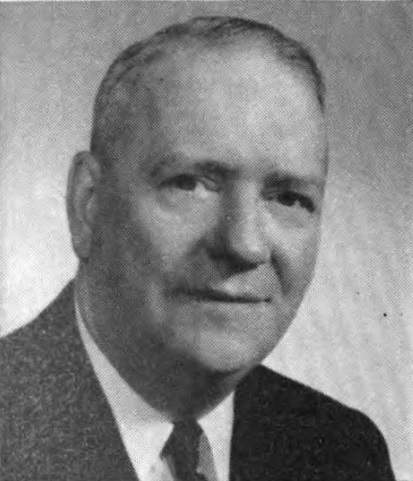
- From 1957's Pocket Congressional Directory of the Eighty-Fifth Congress.

Member of the U.S. House of Representatives from Pennsylvania
- In office November 6, 1951 – January 3, 1959
- Preceded by: Wilson D. Gillette
- Succeeded by: Stanley A. Prokop
- Constituency: 14th district (1951–53); 10th district (1953–59)

Personal details
- Born: February 23, 1901 Susquehanna, Pennsylvania, US
- Died: February 6, 1989 (aged 87)
- Party: Republican
- Spouse: Catherine E. O'Neill

Joseph Leonard Carrigg (February 23, 1901 – February 6, 1989) was a Republican member of the U.S. House of Representatives from Pennsylvania.

Joseph L. Carrigg was born in Susquehanna, Pennsylvania; three of his grandparents were Irish immigrants. He graduated from Niagara University in Niagara Falls, New York in 1922, Albany Law School in Albany, New York in 1924, and Dickinson School of Law in Carlisle, Pennsylvania, in 1925. Carrigg was a member of Phi Sigma Kappa fraternity while at Albany. He was district attorney of Susquehanna County, Pennsylvania, from 1936 to 1948, and burgess of the borough of Susquehanna from 1948 to 1951.

Carrigg was elected as a Republican to the 82nd Congress to fill the vacancy caused by the death of Wilson D. Gillette. He was reelected to the Eighty-third, Eighty-fourth, and Eighty-fifth Congresses. Carrigg voted in favor of the Civil Rights Act of 1957. He was an unsuccessful candidate for reelection in 1958, defeated by Democrat Stanley A. Prokop. After his time in Congress, he served as the Director of Practice for the Internal Revenue Service in Washington, D.C., from 1959 to 1960. He also worked as secretary to Representative William Scranton of Pennsylvania in 1961. He served as manager of the State Workmen's Insurance Fund of Pennsylvania from 1963 through 1971.

== Sources ==
- United States Congress. "Joseph L. Carrigg (id: C000182)". Biographical Directory of the United States Congress.
- Joseph L. Carrigg at The Political Graveyard

U.S. House of Representatives
Preceded by Wilson D. Gillette	Member of the U.S. House of Representatives from Pennsylvania's 14th congressional district 1951–1953	Succeeded by George M. Rhodes
Preceded by Harry P. O'Neill	Member of the U.S. House of Representatives from Pennsylvania's 10th congressional district 1953–1959	Succeeded by Stanley A. Prokop
