= Hobe Sound Bible College =

Christian college in Florida, United States

Coordinates: 27.0637318°N 80.1304802°W

- Former name: Hobe Sound Bible Institute
- Motto: "Knowing Christ and Making Him Known"
- Type: Private Bible college
- Established: 1960
- Accreditation: ABHE
- Religious affiliation: Wesleyan-Arminian
- President: Matthew Maloyed
- Location: Hobe Sound, Florida, U.S.
- Website: www.hsbc.edu

Hobe Sound Bible College is a private Bible college in Hobe Sound, Florida. It is a part of the conservative holiness movement and aligned with Wesleyan-Arminian (Methodist) theology.

== History ==
First known as Hobe Sound Bible Institute, the college was founded in 1960 under the leadership of Stephen D. Herron, a Wesleyan Methodist minister and prominent camp meeting speaker and general evangelist, the school's founder and president for 25 years. He had the vision for a conservative holiness school that would offer a quality education. Herron approached H. Robb French and Florida Evangelistic Association, now Hope International Missions, about year-round utilization of the camp meeting facilities for a Bible college. They offered the grounds and facilities of Sea Breeze Camp for such a school.

At the camp meeting of 1960, donations were raised to aid in launching the school. In September of that year, Hobe Sound Bible Institute welcomed its first student body, representing 12 states and Canada. The registration for the first year totaled 24, with a 3-person teaching staff that included Herron, missionary C. J. Goodspeed and Wesleyan Methodist evangelist Johannes Maas, founder of Worldwide Faith Missions. From this small beginning, the college now has a prominent place of service in the holiness movement.

== Accreditation ==
In 1986 the college attained full accreditation with The Association for Biblical Higher Education.

== Academics ==
Hobe Sound Bible College offers Bachelor of Arts degrees as well as Associate of Arts and Associate of Science degrees.

== Christian day school ==
Hobe Sound Bible College operates Hobe Sound Christian Academy, including grades K-2 through 12.
