= Scranton High School =

Scranton High School may refer to:

== Arkansas ==
- Scranton High School (Arkansas), Scranton, Arkansas

== Iowa ==
- Scranton High School (Iowa), Scranton, Iowa

== North Dakota ==
- Scranton High School (North Dakota), Scranton, North Dakota

== Pennsylvania ==
- Scranton High School (Pennsylvania), Scranton, Pennsylvania
- Scranton Preparatory School, Scranton, Pennsylvania
- West Scranton High School, Scranton, Pennsylvania

== See also ==
- Scranton (disambiguation)
