= Hobe Sound Christian Academy =

Private school in Florida, United States

Location
- 11460 SE Gomez Avenue; Hobe Sound, Florida 33455; United States
- Coordinates: 27°03′51″N 80°07′49″W

Information
- Type: Private Christian school
- Principal: Robert Booth
- Teaching staff: 24.8 (on an FTE basis)
- Grades: PK-12
- Enrollment: 225 (2019-2020)
- Student to teacher ratio: 8.1
- Affiliation: Hobe Sound Bible College
- Website: www.hscaonline.com

Hobe Sound Christian Academy (HSCA) is a private, PreK-12 Christian school which shares the campus of Hobe Sound Bible College, about 25 miles north of West Palm Beach, Florida.

Hobe Sound Christian Academy began in 1960 as a service to the children of faculty to Hobe Sound Bible College, a seminary in the Wesleyan-Arminian (Methodist) tradition. It is operated under the auspices of Hobe Sound Bible College and is open to all students. HSCA is committed to offering a Christ-centered education.
