= Worthington C. Smith =

American politician and railroad president (1823–1894)

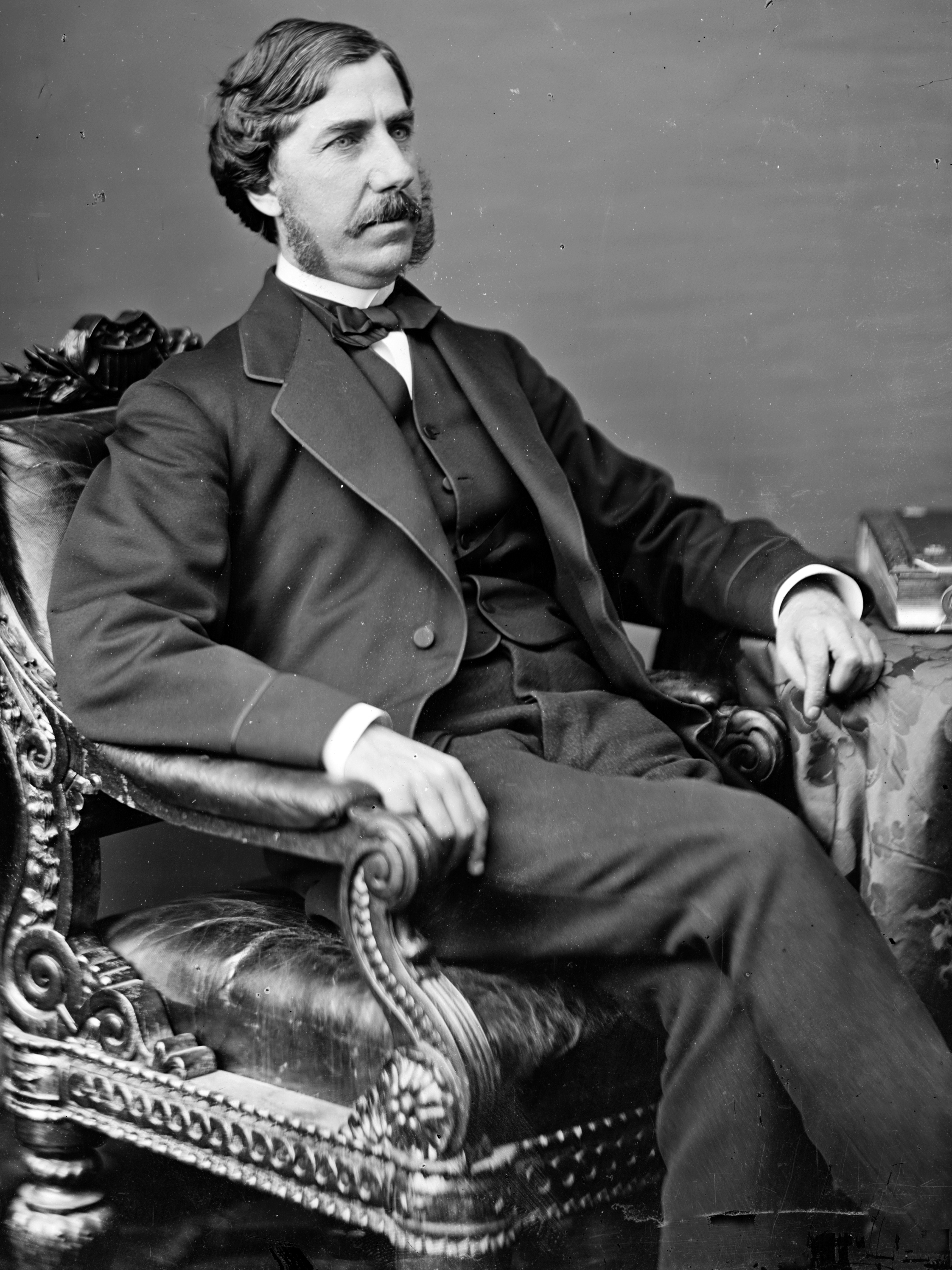

Member of the United States House of Representatives from Vermont's 3rd district
- In office March 4, 1867 – March 3, 1873
- Preceded by: Portus Baxter
- Succeeded by: George Whitman Hendee

Personal details
- Born: April 19, 1823 St. Albans, Vermont, U.S.
- Died: January 2, 1894 (aged 70) St. Albans, Vermont, U.S.
- Party: Republican
- Spouse: Catherine M. Walworth
- Children: F. Walworth Smith and W. Tracy Smith
- Education: University of Vermont at Burlington
- Profession: Politician

Worthington Curtis Smith (April 19, 1823 – January 2, 1894) was an American politician and railroad president. He served as a U.S. representative from Vermont, and was the son of John Smith, of Vermont, a U.S. representative from Vermont.

== Early life ==
Smith was born in St. Albans, Vermont, to John Smith and Maria Curtis Smith. He pursued classical studies and was a member of the Lambda Iota Society at the University of Vermont where he graduated in 1843. Smith studied law with his father but did not practice.

== Career ==
Smith was involved in the iron trade, and from 1845 until 1860 he engaged in the manufacture of railroad supplies in the iron foundries located in Plattsburgh and St. Albans. During the Civil War, Smith assisted in raising the 1st Vermont Infantry Regiment.

Smith served as a member of the Vermont House of Representatives in 1863. He was a member of the Vermont State Senate in 1864 and 1865, and was unanimously elected President pro tempore in 1865. He was the president of the Vermont National Bank from 1864 until 1870.

Smith was elected as a Republican candidate to the Fortieth, Forty-first, and Forty-second Congresses, serving from March 4, 1867, until March 3, 1873. In Congress he served as chairman of the Committees of Banking and Currency, Manufactures and Weights and Measures.

Smith served as president of the St. Albans Foundry Company. He was director, and later president, of the Vermont and Canada Railroad, and vice-president of the Central Vermont Railway. From 1868 until 1892 he was a member of the corporation of the University of Vermont.

== Personal life ==
Smith married Katherine M. Walworth on January 12, 1850. They had five children, including F. Walworth Smith, member of the Colorado State Senate, and W. Tracy Smith, vice-president and treasurer of the St. Albans Foundry Company.

Worthington C. Smith was the brother of Governor J. Gregory Smith and uncle of Governor Edward Curtis Smith.

Smith's daughter Katherine Maria Smith (1851-1935) was the wife of businessman William Walker Scranton (1844-1916). Their son Worthington Scranton (1876-1955) was the father of William Scranton, who served as Governor of Pennsylvania. The genealogical line for William Scranton runs from John Smith (great-great-grandfather) to Worthington C. Smith (great-grandfather) to Katherine Maria Smith Scranton (grandmother) to Worthington Scranton (father) to William Scranton.

== Death ==
Smith died in St. Albans, Vermont, on January 2, 1894. He was buried at Greenwood Cemetery in St. Albans.

U.S. House of Representatives
Preceded by Portus Baxter	Member of the U.S. House of Representatives from Vermont's 3rd congressional district 1867-1873	Succeeded by George W. Hendee
