= Hobe Sound, Florida =

- Census-designated place
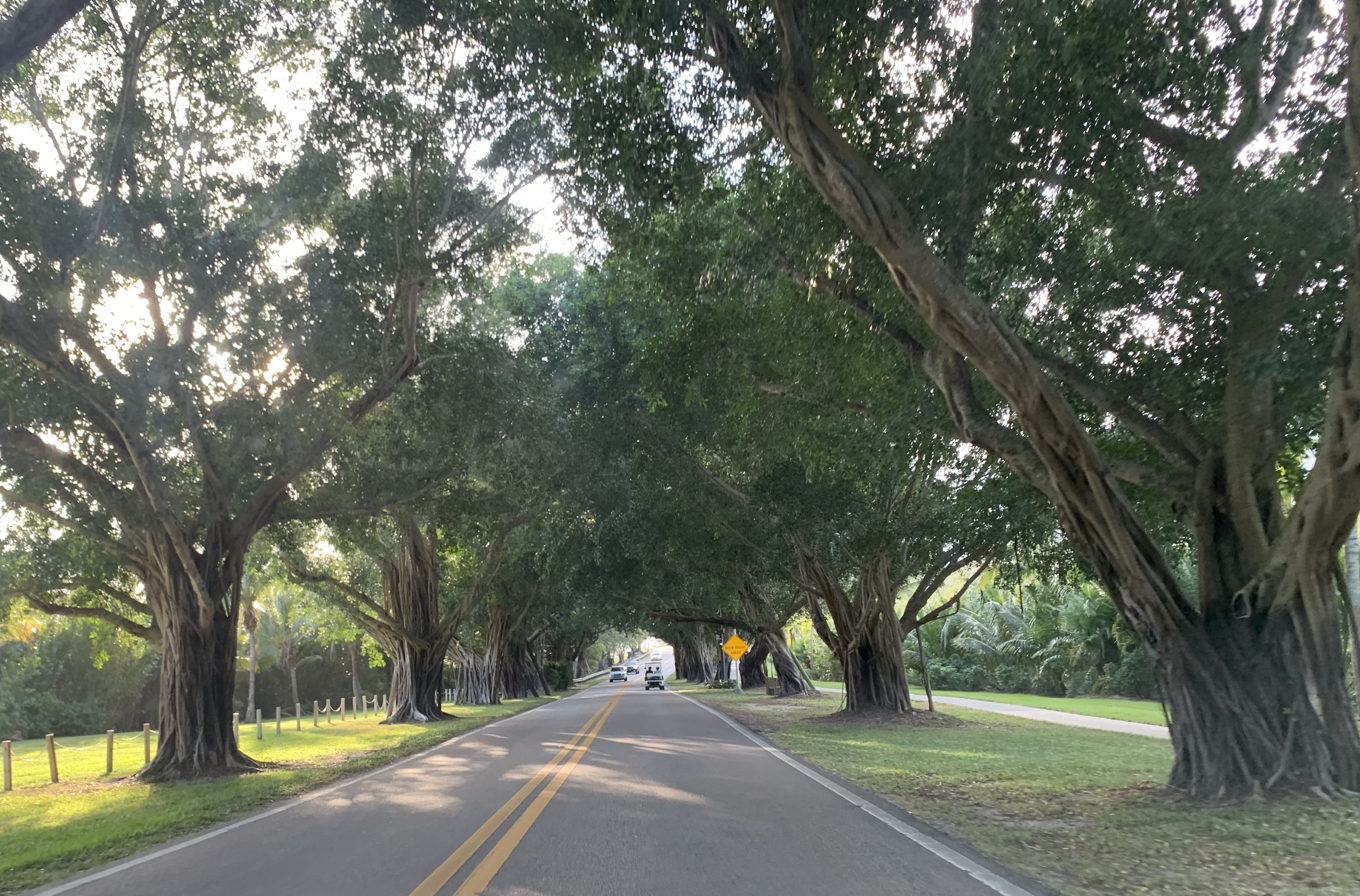
- Banyan trees on Hobe Sound Beach in Jupiter Island

- Location in Martin County and the state of Florida
- Coordinates: 27°03′46″N 80°07′42″W
- Country: United States
- State: Florida
- County: Martin

Area
  - Total: 7.72 sq mi (20.00 km^{2})
  - Land: 7.11 sq mi (18.41 km^{2})
  - Water: 0.61 sq mi (1.59 km^{2})
- Elevation: 20 ft (6.1 m)

Population (2020)
  - Total: 13,163
  - Density: 1,852.4/sq mi (715.2/km^{2})
- Time zone: UTC-5 (Eastern (EST))
  - Summer (DST): UTC-4 (EDT)
- ZIP Codes: 33455, 33475
- Area code: 772
- FIPS code: 12-30975
- GNIS feature ID: 2402592

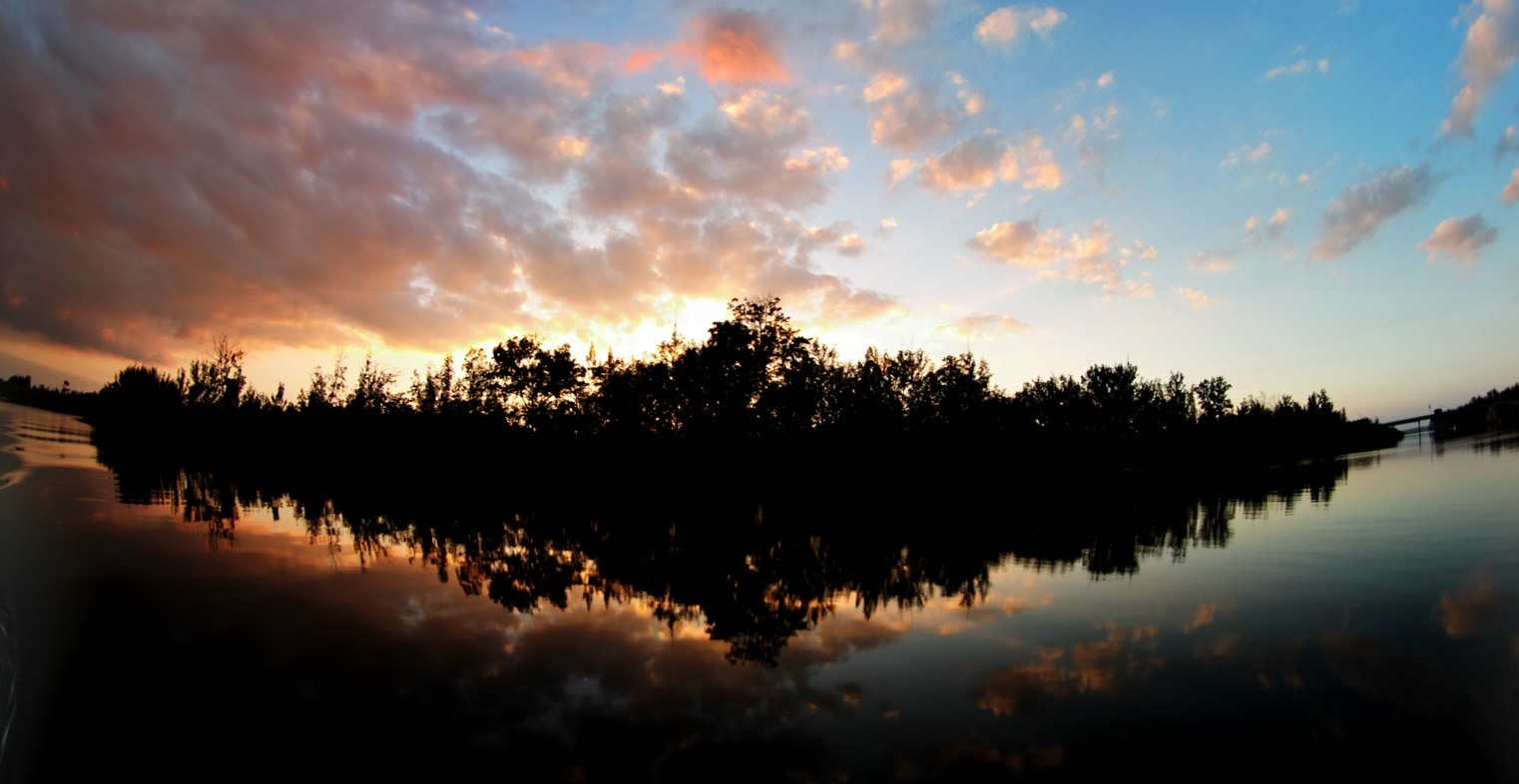
Sunset from the Intracoastal Waterway in Hobe Sound

Hobe Sound is an unincorporated area and census-designated place (CDP) in Martin County, Florida, United States, located along Florida's Treasure Coast. The population was 13,163 at the 2020 census, up from 11,521 in 2010.

== Geography ==
Hobe Sound is located in southeastern Martin County. It is an exurban area near the Atlantic Ocean, approximately 25 miles (40 km) north of West Palm Beach and 12 miles (19 km) southeast of Stuart. It stretches along the coast between Port Salerno to the north and Jonathan Dickinson State Park to the south. To the east, across South Jupiter Narrows, is Jupiter Island. Hobe Sound Public Beach, within the town of Jupiter Island, is one of Martin County's four guarded beaches.

== History ==
Hobe Sound is the anglicized form of the name of a village of the Jaega, a Native American group that lived in the area before European settlement. The Spanish recorded the village name as "Jobe" or "Jove" [ˈxoβe]. Jonathan Dickinson, whose party was shipwrecked near the town in 1696, spelled the name of the village "Hoe-bey".

Parts of Hobe Sound were included in the 12,000-acre (49 km^{2}) Gomez grant given by Spain to Don Eusebio in 1815. In 1821, Gomez sold 8,000 acres (32 km^{2}), including Jupiter Island, to Joseph Delespine for $1 per acre.

Shortly after the turn of the 20th century, Henry Flagler built his railroad along the east coast of Florida, passing through Hobe Sound. This gradually created many opportunities including jobs, the birth of tourism, and other related industries.

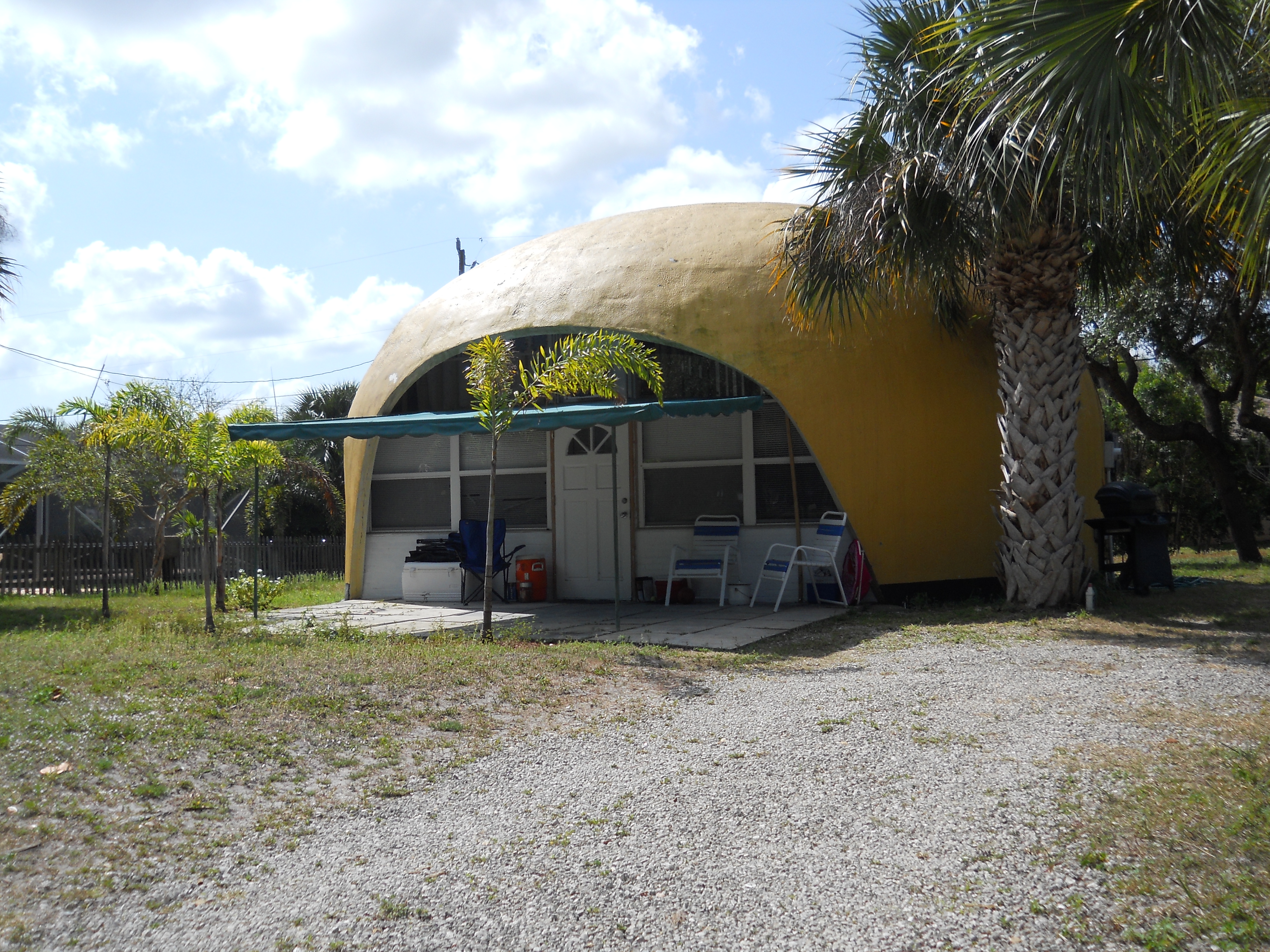
A "Bubble House" in Hobe Sound

During the land boom of the 1920s elaborate plans were announced for Hobe Sound by the Olympia Improvement Corporation. Their goal was to create a town, in Greek style, where motion pictures could be produced. Street names bore such names as Zeus, Saturn, Mercury, Mars, Olympus, Venus, Pluto and Athena. For a brief time Hobe Sound was renamed "Picture City" and plans were presented for a movie picture production center. The boom collapsed after the 1928 Okeechobee hurricane, and the original name was restored. Street names remained, however, as did the cement streetlights along Dixie Highway.

In 1924, the building which soon would become the new schoolhouse in Hobe Sound was constructed. The Martin County Board of Public Instruction secured the use of the new school building from the Picture City Corporation in 1925, and in October of that year, the Olympia School opened. The school was designated the "Picture City School" of Martin County. It remained in use as a school until 1962.

Other mementos of the past are gone, including the ice plant, which was south of Bridge Road; the old train station, which now, refurbished and relocated west of Hobe Sound, serves as an office building for Becker Groves; and the Texaco station east of the Winn-Dixie plaza, which no longer supplies gasoline but continues to serve the community with car rentals and a livery service, operated by its founding family.

Hobe Sound is positioned at the southern end of environmentally-sensitive Martin (named after Governor Martin) County. It has been stated that at Hobe Sound's front door lies the Gold Coast and that at her back door lies the Treasure Coast. Thus, Hobe Sound can lend to both while retaining its heritage and character. Hobe Sound's proximity to the coast affords immediate access to the Atlantic Ocean and the deep-channeled Intracoastal Waterway, a 1,200-mile (1,900 km) water route that provides a sheltered passage for boats along the eastern seaboard.

Another significant historical association possessed by Hobe Sound is the brief stay there of former Defense Secretary James Forrestal in 1949 between his resignation from that post and his death.

Around 1:30 a.m. on March 14, 1997, President Bill Clinton fell on the steps and twisted his knee at golfer Greg Norman's 80-acre oceanside estate in Hobe Sound. Clinton was staying there to play in a golf tournament sponsored by Norman.

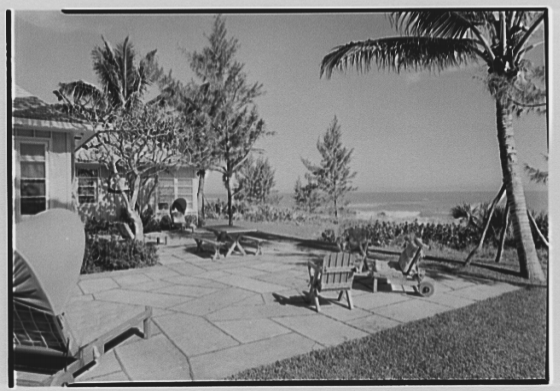
Residence of Worthington and Marion Margery Scranton, Hobe Sound (1942)

Hobe Sound is a predominantly wealthy community whose residents have included such celebrities and other prominent persons as Tiger Woods, Alan Jackson, Celine Dion, Burt Reynolds, and Marion Margery Scranton, among others. Over the decades, it was home or a winter home for wealthy businessman and industrialists, politicians, and sports and entertainment celebrities.

Police protection for Hobe Sound is provided by the Martin County Sheriff's Department. The Martin County Fire Rescue Department provides modern fire, rescue, as well as EMS Services. State-of-the-art inter-facility EMS services are also provided by the Martin Health System.

== Counties ==
Hobe Sound has been part of the following counties:

- St. Johns County, 1821-1824
- Mosquito County, now Orange County, 1824-1844
- Brevard County, 1844-1866. Note: The present-day Brevard County was known as St. Lucie County from 1844-1855, but it was not the same county as today's St. Lucie County.
- Dade County, 1866-1909
- Palm Beach County, 1909-1925
- Martin County, 1925–present

== Demographics ==
Historical population
Census	Pop.	Note	%±
2000	11,376		—
2010	11,521		1.3%
2020	13,163		14.3%
U.S. Decennial Census

=== 2020 census ===
As of the 2020 census, Hobe Sound had a population of 13,163. The median age was 56.9 years. 13.8% of residents were under the age of 18 and 34.1% were 65 years of age or older. For every 100 females, there were 97.3 males, and for every 100 females age 18 and over, there were 94.9 males.

100.0% of residents lived in urban areas, while 0.0% lived in rural areas.

There were 6,216 households in Hobe Sound, including 3,397 families. Of all households, 16.3% had children under the age of 18 living in them, 44.2% were married-couple households, 21.1% were households with a male householder and no spouse or partner present, and 27.6% were households with a female householder and no spouse or partner present. About 35.0% of all households were made up of individuals, and 20.7% had someone living alone who was 65 years of age or older.

There were 7,366 housing units, of which 15.6% were vacant. The homeowner vacancy rate was 2.0% and the rental vacancy rate was 6.7%.

Hobe Sound racial composition (Hispanics excluded from racial categories) (NH = Non-Hispanic)
Race	Number	Percentage
White (NH)	10,387	78.91%
Black or African American (NH)	744	5.65%
Native American or Alaska Native (NH)	19	0.14%
Asian (NH)	126	0.96%
Pacific Islander (NH)	7	0.05%
Some Other Race (NH)	34	0.26%
Mixed/Multi-Racial (NH)	458	3.48%
Hispanic or Latino	1,388	10.54%
Total	13,163	

=== 2000 census ===
As of the census of 2000, there were 11,376 people, 5,176 households, and 3,266 families residing in the CDP. The population density was 2,082.8 persons per square mile (804.5/km^{2}). There were 6,042 housing units at an average density of 1,106.2 houses per square mile (427.3/km^{2}). The racial makeup of the CDP was 91.98% White, 5.79% African American, 0.15% Native American, 0.60% Asian, 0.03% Pacific Islander, 0.64% from other races, and 0.81% from two or more races. Hispanic or Latino of any race were 2.22% of the population.

There were 5,176 households, out of which 18.7% had children under the age of 18 living with them, 54.1% were married couples living together, 6.4% had a female householder with no husband present, and 36.9% were non-families. 31.2% of all households were made up of individuals, and 17.0% had someone living alone who was 65 years of age or older. The average household size was 2.14 and the average family size was 2.66.

In the CDP, the population was spread out, with 16.8% under the age of 18, 4.8% from 18 to 24, 20.5% from 25 to 44, 24.9% from 45 to 64, and 33.0% who were 65 years of age or older. The median age was 51 years. For every 100 females, there were 93.3 males. For every 100 females age 18 and over, there were 90.6 males.

The median income for a household in the CDP was $36,541, and the median income for a family was $45,412. Males had a median income of $36,943 versus $27,773 for females. The per capita income for the CDP was $21,603. About 3.7% of families and 5.5% of the population were below the poverty line, including 3.7% of those under age 18 and 6.0% of those age 65 or over.

== Transportation ==
Travel in Hobe Sound is predominantly performed by private automobile. There are no interstate highways in Hobe Sound; the nearest, Interstate 95, is 7 miles (11 km) west. Hobe Sound is dominated by US 1, a four- and six-lane arterial road that runs north to south. Other important throughways include Florida State Road A1A (locally known as a part of the old 'Dixie Highway'), Bridge Road, Gomez Avenue, and Osprey Street. US 1 arguably represents the central business district though some commercial activity occurs on Dixie Highway (A1A) near Bridge Road.

=== Mass transit ===
Martin County Public Transit (MARTY) provides fixed-route bus service through Hobe Sound. Hobe Sound located on MARTY bus route 4 and route 20x. Bus route 20x offers service to Palm Beach County, and connects with Palm Tran bus service. The Community Coach, a service of the Council on Aging of Martin County, is an additional public transportation service for Martin County. It operates a curb-to-curb, advance reservation, shared ride service and also operates fixed-route services in other parts of the county. The closest Tri-Rail commuter railroad station is located in Mangonia Park to the south.

=== Railroads ===
The Florida East Coast Railway runs through Hobe Sound parallel to A1A. At-grade crossings can be found at (from north to south) A1A, Osprey Street, Crossrip Street, Pettway Street, Bridge Road, and Gleason Street.

Until 1963 long distance trains, East Coast Champion, City of Miami, Havana Special and South Wind, served Hope Sound's station. Until 1957 the Dixieland, (nee Dixie Flagler) made stops there as well. Until 1968 local Jacksonville to Miami trains made stops at Hobe Sound.

The Stuart Brightline station is scheduled to open in 2029, pending federal funding, and will be located a few miles north of Hobe Sound in Downtown Stuart. Currently, the West Palm Beach Brightline station is the closest stop to Hobe Sound. The historic West Palm Beach station is also served by Tri-Rail, and is the closest Amtrak stop to Hobe Sound.

=== Airports ===
The closest airport to Hobe Sound is Witham Field, and is located in Stuart. This airport is primarily used for general aviation. The closest airport offering commercial service is President Donald J. Trump International Airport.

== Education ==
The Hobe Sound Bible College is the only institution that provides post-secondary education within Hobe Sound. Private schools include the Hobe Sound Christian Academy. Publicly run schools include Hobe Sound Elementary and Seawind Elementary Schools. Residents of Hobe Sound attend Murray Middle School and South Fork High School.

The Pine School (formerly St. Michael's Independent) is now located on its new campus in Hobe Sound. This prestigious private school has a college preparatory program and educational opportunities for Kindergarten through 12th grade students. The campus offers education covering the basic arts (graphics, music, and media).

== Notable people ==
- Ted Cabot, lawyer, politician, and judge
- Greg Norman, No. 1 ranked golfer in the 1980s and 90s
- Mary Oliver, poet
- Nathaniel Reed, Assistant Director Dept. of the Interior
- Vanessa Rousso, professional poker player and Big Brother 17 contestant
- Sydney Towle, American social media infleuncer
- Marion Margery Scranton, women's suffrage activist, leading member of the Republican Party in the United States
- Worthington Scranton, businessman, lawyer, and philanthropist, and member of the prominent Scranton family

== Sources ==
- History, Hobe Sound Chamber of Commerce
