= Stanley A. Prokop =

American politician (1909–1977)

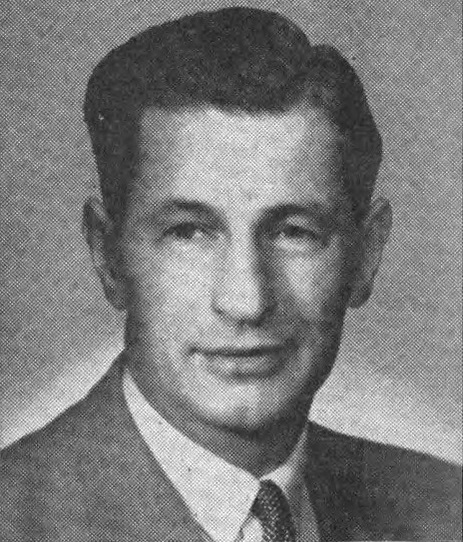
From 1959's Pocket Congressional Directory of the Eighty-Sixth Congress

Stanley A. Prokop (July 29, 1909 – November 11, 1977) was a Democratic U.S. representative from Pennsylvania from 1959 to 1961.

== Biography ==
Born on July 29, 1909, in Throop, Pennsylvania, a community in Lackawanna County, Prokop attended Villanova University in Philadelphia.

At the beginning of World War II, he enlisted in the United States Army as a private, and was assigned to the 30th Infantry Division. He subsequently rose to the rank of captain.

Post-war, he served on the North Pococno Joint Board of Education for ten years, and was then elected to the United States Congress in 1958, defeating incumbent Republican Congressman Joseph L. Carrigg.

A one-term member, Prokop was defeated for re-election in 1960 by future Pennsylvania governor William Scranton, a moderate Republican. He was then hired as Lackawanna County's director of Veterans' Affairs, a position he held for fourteen years.

== Final years, death and interment ==
Prokop moved to Lake Ariel, Pennsylvania, during his county government tenure, and remained in that job until his death on Veterans Day in 1977. His remains were interred at the St. Catherine Cemetery in Moscow, Pennsylvania.

U.S. House of Representatives
Preceded by Joseph L. Carrigg	Member of the U.S. House of Representatives from Pennsylvania's 10th congressional district 1959–1961	Succeeded by William Scranton
