= Joseph Delespine =

Joseph Delespine (1789–1834) was a merchant and land owner in Florida in the 19th century. The Spanish land grants in Florida he received were the subject of two cases at the Supreme Court of the United States.

On 8 April 1817, he petitioned for 50,000 acres of land on the west of Indian River and on 9 April 1817, José María Coppinger, the Governor of Spanish East Florida, granted him 43,000 acres.

In 1821, Delespine purchased 8,000 acres (32 km2) at Hobe Sound, Florida, including Jupiter Island, for $1 per acre.
