= Scranton Area Community Foundation =

- Nickname: SACF
- Predecessor: Scranton Foundation
- Formation: 1954; 72 years ago
- Type: Public 501(c)(3) community foundation
- Purpose: Accepts and administers donor gifts and bequests to support arts, civic affairs, educational, environmental, health, and human services organizations in Northeastern Pennsylvania
- Location(s): 612 Jefferson Avenue; Scranton, PA 18510 (570) 347-6203
- President and CEO: Laura Ducceschi
- Vice president, administration and projects: Maggie Martinelli
- Website: safdn.org

The Scranton Area Community Foundation is a public 501(c)(3) community foundation headquartered in Scranton, Pennsylvania, which was established in 1954 as a community trust by Worthington Scranton and Marion Margery Scranton to support charitable and educational organizations in the city of Scranton.

The organization's 2021 mission statement notes that its objective "is to enhance the quality of life for all people in Northeastern Pennsylvania through the development of organized philanthropy."

== History ==
Established as a community trust in 1954, the Scranton Foundation was created by Worthington Scranton and Marion Margery Scranton to support charitable and educational organizations in the city of Scranton, Pennsylvania, and was launched by their initial donation of one million dollars e. According to The Plain Speaker, at the time of the foundation's creation, Margery Scranton "made it clear [the foundation] was named after the city, not the donors."

In 1970, the organization's name was changed to the Scranton Area Community Foundation. Officially designated as a public community foundation by the U.S. Internal Revenue Service in 1988, the foundation was converted from a trust to a corporation in 1998, at which time it adopted the name Scranton Area Community Foundation, Inc. According to a 2020 article in Scranton's Times-Tribune, the foundation "accepts and administers donors’ gifts and bequests," providing a "tax advantage to donors," and also "acts as a catalyst for change, convening diverse groups to take action on community issues."

As of late 2020, leaders of the foundation were overseeing more than 210 charitable funds with more than $44 million in assets, and were engaged in the distribution of more than one million dollars annually via scholarships to students and grants to arts, civic affairs, educational, environmental, health, and human services organizations.

In 2022, the Scranton Area Community Foundation provided grant funding to the University of Scranton Police Department to present free de-escalation training for roughly forty area police officers to help them "reduce injuries and the need to use physical force by training officers to safely and effectively respond to situations involving people in crisis with effective communication and active listening," according to a university news report.
