= Mary Scranton =

American consultant and community advocate

First Lady of Pennsylvania
- In role January 15, 1963 – January 17, 1967
- Governor: William Scranton
- Preceded by: Alyce Lawrence
- Succeeded by: Jane Shafer

Personal details
- Born: Mary Lowe Chamberlin; April 27, 1918 Scranton, Pennsylvania, U.S.
- Died: December 26, 2015 (aged 97) Montecito, California, U.S.
- Spouse: William Scranton (m. 1942; died 2013)
- Children: Susan Scranton Dawson; William Scranton III; Joseph Scranton; Peter K. Scranton
- Education: Smith College

Mary Lowe Scranton (April 27, 1918 – December 26, 2015) was an American consultant, community advocate and academic trustee. She served as the First Lady of Pennsylvania from 1963 to 1967 during the administration of her husband, William Scranton, the 38th Governor of Pennsylvania and 1964 U.S. presidential candidate. She focused on housing and community affairs issues in Northeastern Pennsylvania after her tenure as Pennsylvania's First Lady.

Mary Scranton was the first woman to serve on the boards of trustees for both the University of Scranton and the California Institute of Technology (Caltech). Scranton, who served on Caltech's board of trustees from 1975 to 1989, was placed in charge of the university's Jet Propulsion Laboratory, a NASA facility. She defended the Jet Propulsion Laboratory and successfully secured federal funding for the laboratory against budget cuts by the Reagan administration during the 1980s. Jet Propulsion Laboratory remains an important component of the U.S. space program to the day, in large part due to Mary Scranton's defense of its programs during that era.

== Biography ==
=== Early life and career ===
Scranton was born Mary Lowe Chamberlin on April 27, 1918 in Scranton, Pennsylvania, to William Lawson Chamberlin and Margaret Lowe Chamberlin. She graduated from Scranton Country Day School and the Masters School, a private boarding school located in Dobbs Ferry, New York. In 1940, Chamberlin received her degree from Smith College in Northampton, Massachusetts.

Chamberlin married her childhood neighbor, William "Bill" Scranton, on July 6, 1942, when she was 24 years old. The Scranton family was the namesake her hometown of Scranton, Pennsylvania. Mary Scranton was working as a research analyst for the Army Air Force's Intelligence Service, based in Washington D.C., at the time of her marriage. She also served as a nurses' aide for the Red Cross later during the war. Mary and William Scranton had one daughter and three sons, including William Scranton III, who would serve as Lieutenant Governor of Pennsylvania from 1979 to 1987. The family lived in Glenburn, Pennsylvania, north of the city of Scranton.

=== Pennsylvania First Lady and 1964 presidential campaign ===
Mary Scranton supported her husband's congressional, gubernatorial and presidential campaigns. Bill Scranton was elected Governor of Pennsylvania in 1962, making his wife the state's First Lady from 1963 to 1967. Scranton, a moderate-to-liberal Republican governor, ran for President of the United States in 1964 as a progressive alternative to Barry Goldwater, a conservative U.S. Senator. Scranton lost the Republican nomination to Goldwater, though Mary Scranton campaigned actively on his behalf. Jack Gould, a New York Times reporter and television critic who covered the 1964 Republican National Convention in San Francisco, praised Mary Scranton's contributions to the campaign and her televised appearance at the convention, writing "If the Republican meeting produced one particularly videogenic personality it was Mrs. Mary Scranton. The mixture of exceptional forcefulness and attractiveness registered with far greater power on the home screen than her husband's predilection to subtlety and understatement. Mrs. Scranton's championing of her husband to the very end invited an emotional involvement on the part of the viewer that somehow the governor never quite secured." Another New York Times story on Mary Scranton, published in June 1964, called her a "campaign star".

First Lady Mary Scranton opposed an idea to relocate the official Pennsylvania Governor's Residence to a proposed penthouse apartment, which would have been located within the old Executive Office Building, which was the original home of the State Museum of Pennsylvania until 1964, on the grounds of the Pennsylvania State Capitol Complex. Scranton argued that no First Lady would want to reside in an apartment without a play area or grass for their children (though the building was surrounded by Capitol Park). Officials scrapped the idea for the Governor's apartment due to Mary Scranton's opposition to the plan. Instead, Bill and Mary Scranton resided at an official residence at Fort Indiantown Gap during the tenure in Harrisburg. The house at Fort Indiantown Gap is now the residence of the Lieutenant Governor.

=== Career ===
Mary Scranton welcomed the end of her role as Pennsylvania First Lady in 1967, when her husband left office after one term. In a 1972 story for the Associated Press, Scranton explained, "When it was over, I realized that I had the golden opportunity of having everything cleared away for me, of being released from all honorary titles and associations...Those four years in Harrisburg were a stage of growth in which we learned talents we can put to use here."

She focused on housing and industrial development in her hometown of Scranton during the 1960s and 1970s. The housing and industrial sectors in the Scranton area had been in decline since the Great Depression of the 1930s, as the mining industry had collapsed. Mary Scranton co-established Scranton Neighbors, which worked to improve the quality of housing in the city of Scranton. New housing developments were constructed through the organization, including the Midtown Apartments, which are still located near the intersection of Adams Avenue and Olive Street in Scranton.

Mary Scranton became the president of Friendship House, a local organization which provides services for children with autism and behavioral problems.

In April 1970, Mary Scranton became the first woman appointed to the board of trustees of the University of Scranton. The University of Scranton later awarded her an honorary degree in 1977.

In 1975, Scranton was appointed to the board of trustees for California Institute of Technology, becoming the first woman to be named to Caltech's board. A trustee from 1975 to 1989, Scranton became the chairperson of the committee which oversaw the Jet Propulsion Laboratory, a federally funded research and development center which is managed by Caltech on behalf of NASA. Scranton defended the Jet Propulsion Laboratory and its programs against steep funding cuts by the Reagan administration during the 1980s. She successfully lobbied Congress and to secure federal funds for the Laboratory, which kept its programs funded and relevant. The Jet Propulsion Laboratory remains an important component of NASA's space program today due to Scranton's oversight during the 1980s.

== Later life ==
Scranton and husband resided at the Casa Dorinda retirement community in Montecito, California, near Santa Barbara, for the last eight years of her life. They also maintained a home in Waverly, Pennsylvania. Her husband, former Pennsylvania Governor William Scranton, had died in 2013 following 71 years of marriage.

Mary Scranton died from complications of Alzheimer's disease at the Casa Dorinda retirement community in Montecito, California, on December 26, 2015, at the age of 97. She was survived by her four children - Susan Scranton Dawson, former Lieutenant Governor of Pennsylvania William Scranton III, Joseph C. Scranton, and Peter K. Scranton - and their families. Governor Tom Wolf ordered flags be lowered to half staff in Scranton's honor until January 3, 2016.

Honorary titles
Preceded by Alyce Lawrence	First Lady of Pennsylvania; 1963–1967	Succeeded by Jane Shafer
