= Worthington Scranton =

American lawyer, businessman and philanthropist

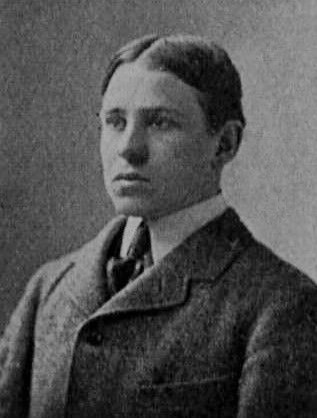
- Worthington Scranton, c. 1898
- Born: Worthington Scranton; August 29, 1876; Scranton, Pennsylvania
- Died: February 13, 1955 (aged 78); West Palm Beach, Florida
- Occupations: President, Scranton Gas and Water Company
- Spouse: Marion Margery (Warren) Scranton (1884-1960)
- Parent(s): William Walker Scranton (1844-1916) and Katherine Maria (Smith) Scranton (1851-1935)

Worthington Scranton (August 29, 1876 – February 13, 1955) was a 20th-century American lawyer, businessman, and philanthropist who became president of the Scranton Gas and Water Company in Scranton, Pennsylvania, a city which was named after his grandfather, Joseph Hand Scranton (1813–1872).

In 1954, he and his wife, Marion Margery Scranton, contributed one million dollars to establish the Scranton Foundation (now the Scranton Area Community Foundation), which was launched to support charitable and educational organizations in the city of Scranton.

== Formative years and family ==
A member of the prominent Scranton family, Worthington Scranton was born in Scranton, Pennsylvania on August 29, 1876. The son of, and successor to, industrialist William Walker Scranton (1844-1916) and Katherine Maria (Smith) Scranton (1851-1935), "he grew up in downtown Scranton in a huge turreted Gothic mansion of gray fieldstone surrounded by a fortresslike wall of stone spiked with iron palings," according to a 1964 Life magazine about the Scranton family.

In 1898, he graduated from Yale University; he then also graduated from Harvard Law School in 1901.

On April 12, 1907, he wed Marion Margery (Warren) Scranton, who went on to become a suffragist and leading member of the Republican Party in the United States. They had four children: Marion M. (Scranton) Isaacs (1908–1992), Katherine (Scranton) Rozendaal (1910–2002), Sara (Scranton) Linen (1913–1997), and William Warren Scranton (1917–2013). His daughters went on to attend Smith College in Northampton, Massachusetts while his son, William, who was born at a cottage in Madison, Connecticut while the family was vacationing there in 1917, graduated from Yale Law School before securing a position with the U.S. State Department in 1959 under President Dwight D. Eisenhower. In 1960, his son was elected to the U.S. Congress, and then won Pennsylvania's gubernatorial race to become the 38th Governor of Pennsylvania on January 15, 1963.

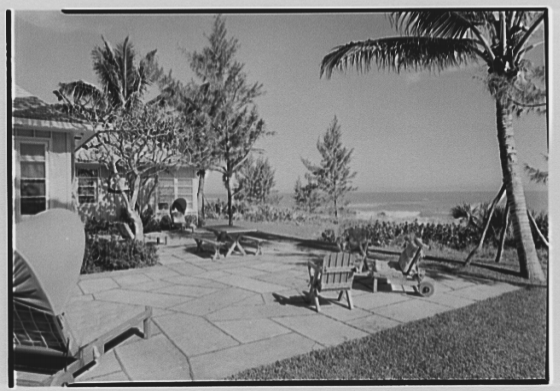
Residence of Worthington and Marion Margery Scranton, Hobe Sound, Florida, 1942.

Initially, Worthington Scranton and his wife resided at the home built between 1867 and 1871 by his grandfather, Joseph Hand Scranton. A 25-room mansion, the home and its grounds had been inherited by Joseph Scranton's son and Worthington's father, William W. Scranton, when Joseph died in 1872, and by Worthington after the death of his mother in 1935. But by 1941, when he and his family were spending more and more time at Marworth, their own home in Dalton, Pennsylvania, they decided to move out of the old Scranton estate entirely and donate it to "Bishop William J. Hafey for use by the University of Scranton," according to the University of Scranton, stating that "the Estate would be 'most advantageously used for the development of an institution of higher learning so that the youth of this vicinity can get an education at a reasonable cost.'"

Marworth was located roughly eight miles north of Scranton. In 1981, ground was broken for a new alcohol and drug rehabilitation center to be operated by the Geisinger Medical Management Corporation on the grounds at the Marworth estate. She and her family also spent their winters at their estate in Hobe Sound, Florida.

== Business and industry leadership ==
In 1927, Scranton began the process of transferring ownership of the Scranton Gas and Water Company, according to the August 11, 1927 edition of The Scranton Republican. Confirmation of the sale, to the Federal Water Service Corporation of New York, was announced in January 1928 at the price of $295 per share for a total of $27,705,000 ($24,800,000 for the purchase of the 84,000 shares of stock available plus $2,925,000 to cover the company's existing bonded indebtedness), which was to be paid on March 20, 1928. Representatives of the buyer stated that:

"The purchase of the Capital Stock of the Scranton Gas and Water Company carries with it, of course, the control of the various subsidiaries of that Company, both Water Companies and Gas Companies. It is expected when control of the Company changes hands that Mr. Scranton and Joe Jeffrey will sever their connections with the Company, but the balance of the operating force, who are familiar with the property will remain at present."

== Civic and philanthropic activities ==
In 1954, he and his wife, Marion Margery Scranton, donated one million dollars to establish the Scranton Foundation (now the Scranton Area Community Foundation) to support charitable and educational organizations in the city of Scranton. According to The Plain Speaker, at the time of the foundation's creation, "his wife made it clear it was named after the city, not the donors." By 2020, leaders of the foundation were overseeing more than 210 charitable funds with more than $44 million in assets, and were also distributing more than $1 million annually via grants and scholarships.

== Death and interment ==
When he was 78 years old, Scranton became seriously ill while vacationing at his family's estate in Florida. Hospitalized in West Palm Beach, Florida on Friday, February 11, 1955, he died there two days later. The cause of death was coronary thrombosis. His remains were returned to Pennsylvania. Following funeral services on February 17 at the Westminster Presbyterian Church in Scranton, he was buried at the Dunmore Cemetery in Lackawanna County.

== Gallery ==
=== Scranton estate, Hobe Sound, Florida, 1942 ===
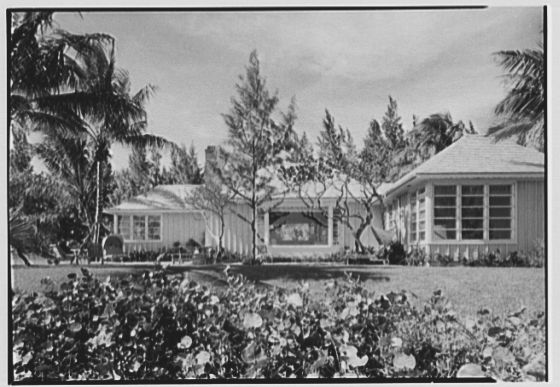
Scranton estate house, view from the beach

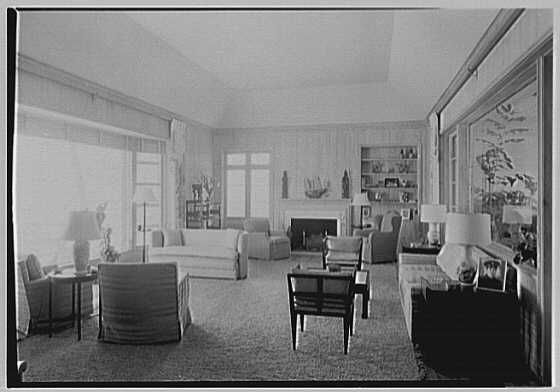
Living room, fireplace view

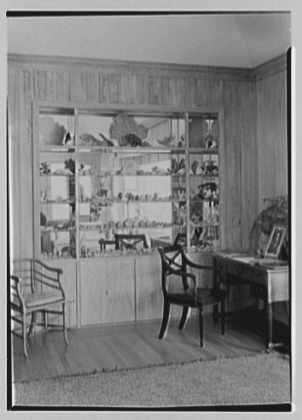
Living room, seashell display

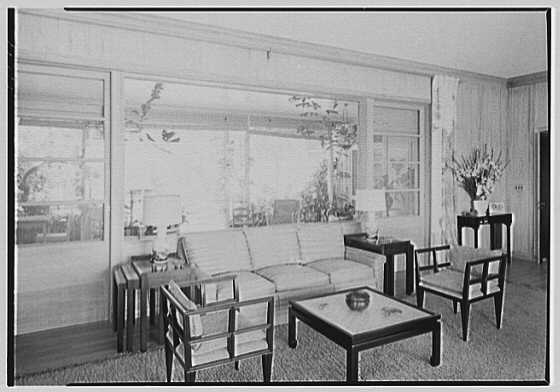
Living room view of patio window

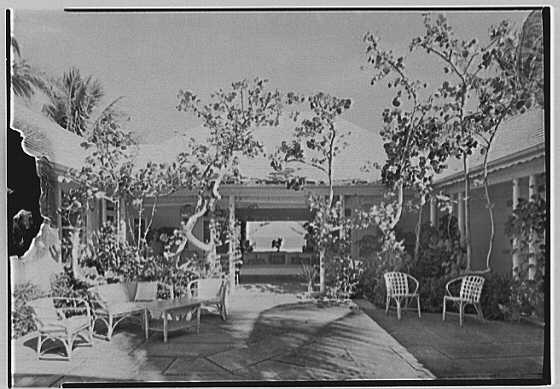
Patio view of ocean

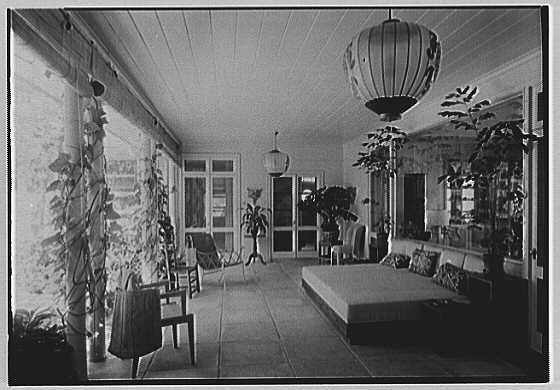
West loggia

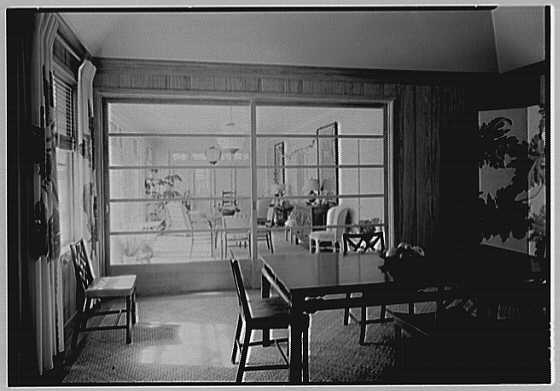
Dining room, view to loggia

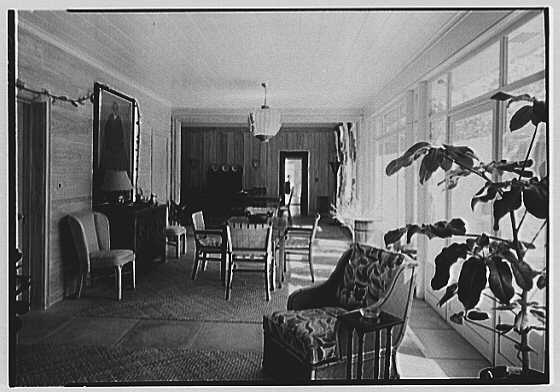
North loggia
