= George W. Scranton =

American politician (1811–1861)

George Whitfield Scranton
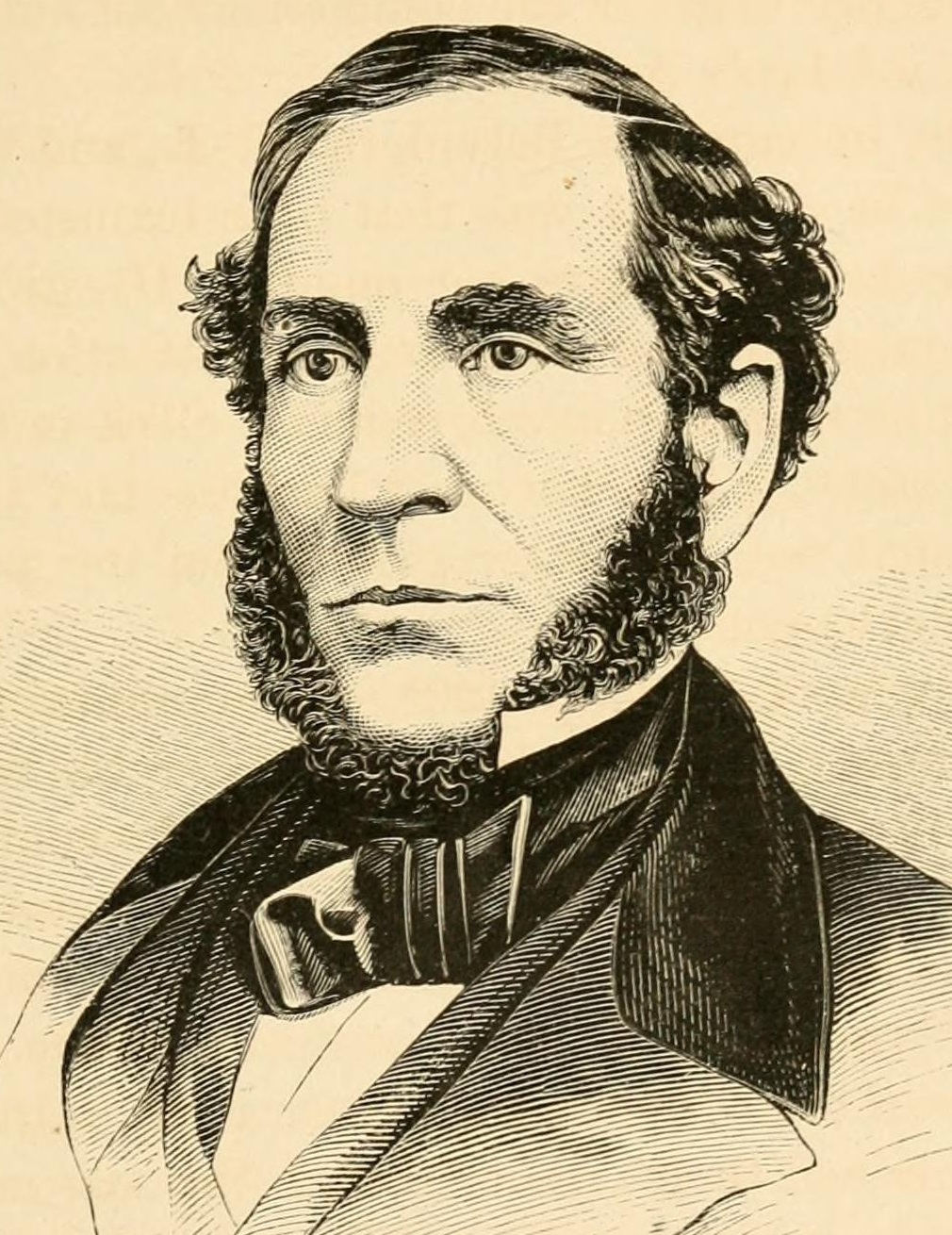

Member of the U.S. House of Representatives from Pennsylvania's 12th district
- In office March 4, 1859 – March 24, 1861
- Preceded by: Paul Leidy
- Succeeded by: Hendrick Bradley Wright

Personal details
- Born: May 11, 1811 Madison, Connecticut, U.S.
- Died: March 24, 1861 (aged 49) Scranton, Pennsylvania, U.S.
- Party: Republican
- Relatives: Scranton family
- Occupation: Industrialist

George Whitfield Scranton (May 11, 1811 – March 24, 1861) was an American industrialist and politician, a Republican member of the U.S. House of Representatives from Pennsylvania from March 4, 1859, until his death in 1861. Moving to Pennsylvania in the late 1830s to establish an iron furnace, he and his brother Selden T. Scranton are considered the founders of the city of Scranton, Pennsylvania, named for their family. They and two partners established what became known as the Iron & Coal Company. They developed a method of producing T–rails for constructing railroad track, which previously had been imported from England. The innovation led to a boom in production of track and construction of railroads.

Scranton became a major industrialist, also leading the Delaware, Lackawanna and Western Railroad, which depended on the iron industry.

After his death, his cousin Joseph H. Scranton, an early investor who had moved to this city, became president and the cousin's son, William Walker Scranton, became general manager of the Iron & Coal Company. W.W. Scranton managed the company during and after the Scranton General Strike of 1877, founding the Lackawanna Steel Company.

== Early life ==
Scranton was born in Madison, Connecticut. Among his siblings was his brother Selden T. Scranton. He attended Lee’s Academy. He moved to Belvidere, New Jersey, in 1828 and became a teamster. He and his brother both worked at Oxford Furnace, an iron manufacturing factory.

== Career ==
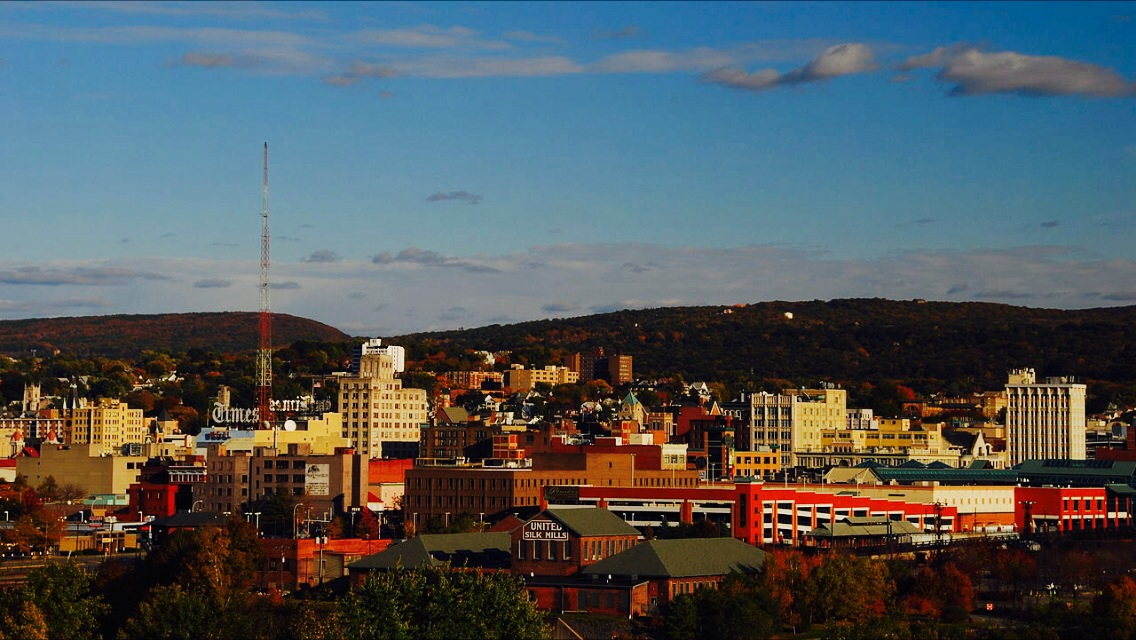
Skyline of downtown Scranton, Pennsylvania, named for George W. Scranton and his family

Learning of extensive iron and coal deposits in Northeast Pennsylvania, the two Scranton brothers became interested in potential for new industry and moved to this area of mining "hard" or anthracite coal. Together with Sanford Grant and Philip H. Mattes, they formed the firm of Scrantons, Grant & Company. Mattes was head of a branch of a bank in Easton, Pennsylvania, and helped gain financing.

In 1839 Scranton started to manufacture iron, and began experimenting with the practicability of smelting ore by means of "hard" or anthracite coal in Slocum Hollow (now Scranton, Pennsylvania). This area was developing as the center of extensive mining of anthracite coal.

Scranton was the founder of the Lackawanna Iron & Coal Company, named after the river. He and his brother Selden, together with Grant and Mattes, are considered founders of the city of Scranton, named after the Scranton family. He also constructed the Northumberland division of the Lackawanna Railroad, helping to create the Delaware, Lackawanna and Western Railroad. He was the president of two railroad companies.

In 1858 Selden Scranton returned to Oxford Furnace in New Jersey.

=== Politics ===
Scranton was elected to Congress from Pennsylvania as a Republican in 1858 to the 36th Congress and served from March 4, 1859, until his death of tuberculosis on March 24, 1861.

== Personal life ==
On January 21, 1835, Scranton married Jane Hiles of Belvidere. They had two children, Elizabeth Warner Fuller and James Selden Scranton.

In 1847, his cousin Joseph A. Scranton moved with his second wife and young family to this corner of Pennsylvania.

One of his sons, William Walker Scranton, went to Yale and, in the family tradition, later becoming general manager of the Lackawanna Iron & Coal Company. In 1877, he led the company during the extensive protests and action in the city during the Scranton General Strike.

== See also ==
- List of members of the United States Congress who died in office (1790–1899)

== Sources ==
- United States Congress. "George W. Scranton (id: S000191)". Biographical Directory of the United States Congress.

U.S. House of Representatives
Preceded by Paul Leidy	Member of the U.S. House of Representatives from Pennsylvania's 12th congressional district 1859–1861	Succeeded by Hendrick Bradley Wright
