= William Scranton =

Governor of Pennsylvania from 1963 to 1967

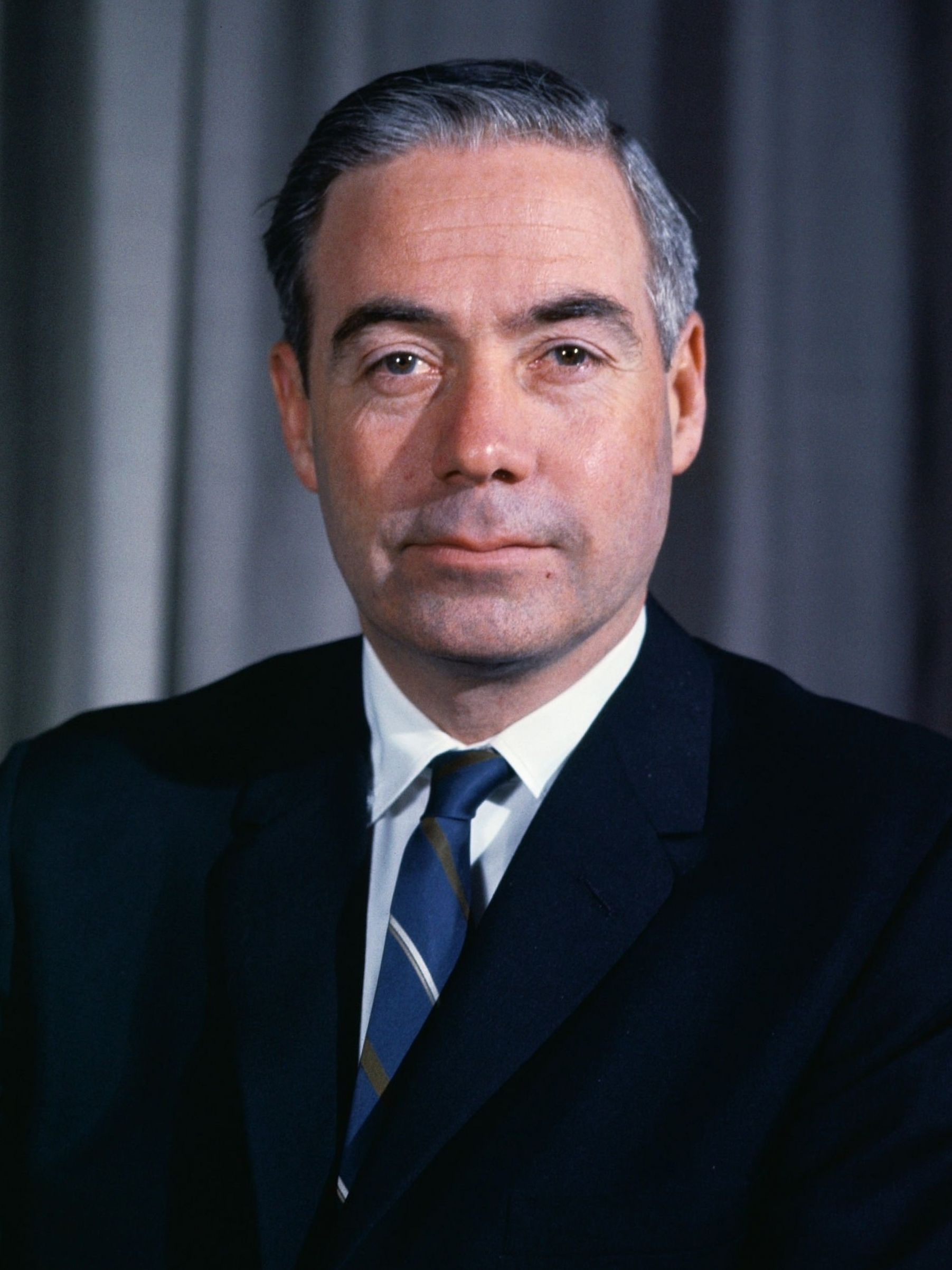
- Official portrait, 1962

13th United States Ambassador to the United Nations
- In office March 15, 1976 – January 19, 1977
- President: Gerald Ford
- Preceded by: Daniel Patrick Moynihan
- Succeeded by: Andrew Young

38th Governor of Pennsylvania
- In office January 15, 1963 – January 17, 1967
- Lieutenant: Raymond P. Shafer
- Preceded by: David Lawrence
- Succeeded by: Raymond P. Shafer

Member of the U.S. House of Representatives from Pennsylvania's 10th district
- In office January 3, 1961 – January 3, 1963
- Preceded by: Stanley Prokop
- Succeeded by: Joseph McDade

Personal details
- Born: William Warren Scranton; July 19, 1917 Madison, Connecticut, U.S.
- Died: July 28, 2013 (aged 96) Montecito, California, U.S.
- Party: Republican
- Spouse: Mary Lowe Chamberlain (m. 1942)
- Children: 4, including William III
- Relatives: Scranton family
- Education: Yale University (BA, LLB)

Military service
- Allegiance: United States
- Branch/service: United States Army Air Forces; United States Air Force
- Years of service: 1941–1945
- Rank: Captain

William Warren Scranton (July 19, 1917 – July 28, 2013) was an American Republican Party politician and diplomat. Scranton served as the 38th governor of Pennsylvania from 1963 to 1967, and as United States Ambassador to the United Nations from 1976 to 1977.

Born into the prominent Scranton family, William W. Scranton graduated from Yale Law School and served in the United States Army Air Corps during World War II. After the war, he practiced law and became active in the Pennsylvania Republican Party. He won election to the United States House of Representatives in 1960 and gained a reputation as an outspoken moderate during his time in Congress. He won the Republican nomination in Pennsylvania's 1962 gubernatorial election, defeating Democrat Richardson Dilworth in the general election.

As governor, Scranton presided over sweeping reforms to Pennsylvania's education system, including the creation of the state's community college system. Scranton entered the race for the 1964 Republican presidential nomination after the collapse of Nelson Rockefeller's candidacy, but Barry Goldwater won the nomination. Scranton was term-limited out of office in 1967 but remained active in politics. He chaired the President's Commission on Campus Unrest, served as a member of the transition team for President Gerald Ford, and served as the United States Ambassador to the United Nations from 1976 to 1977. He also served on the boards of several high-profile corporations and was associated with the Trilateral Commission and the Council on Foreign Relations.

== Early life ==
William Scranton was born on July 19, 1917, while the Scranton family was on vacation at a cottage in Madison, Connecticut. He was the son of Worthington Scranton, a wealthy Pennsylvania businessman who was the president of the Scranton Gas and Water Company, and Marion Margery (Warren) Scranton, a member of the Republican National Committee for over two decades. Despite her own involvement in politics, his mother tried to dissuade him from entering politics because of his childhood struggles with asthma. She feared that the stress of campaigning would be detrimental to his frail health. She died just before her son's election to Congress in 1960.

Scranton family members, George W. Scranton and his brother Selden, were the founders and patriarchs of the city of Scranton, Pennsylvania. He was the grandnephew of Joseph A. Scranton, a Representative from Pennsylvania. He was also a nephew by marriage of former U.S. Supreme Court Justice David Davis, a confidante of President Abraham Lincoln. His maternal ancestors came to America on the Mayflower.

Scranton's father was the son of William Walker Scranton (1844–1916) and Katharine Maria Smith (1851–1935). His father was an industrialist, general manager of the Lackawanna Iron & Coal Company founded by George W. Scranton, among other interests in Scranton. Katherine Smith was the daughter of Worthington Curtis Smith, who served as a United States Congressman from Vermont. Katherine M. Smith's uncle was J. Gregory Smith, who served as Governor of Vermont. Her cousins included Edward Curtis Smith, who also served as governor. Her grandfather, John Smith, also served as a United States Congressman from Vermont. Scranton's genealogical line runs from John Smith (great-great-grandfather) to Worthington C. Smith (great-grandfather) to Katherine Maria Smith Scranton (paternal grandmother) to Worthington Scranton (father) to Scranton.

William Warren Scranton resided with his parents for many years at Marworth, an estate in Dalton, Pennsylvania, that was located roughly eight miles north of Scranton. Following the death of his parents, he inherited the estate. On October 9, 1976, Scranton and his wife hosted a "Day in the Country" party at Marworth. Among the guests in attendance were U.N. Secretary-General Kurt Waldheim and James Murray, British ambassador to the United Nations. In 1981, ground was broken for a new alcohol and drug rehabilitation center to be operated by the Geisinger Medical Management Corporation on the grounds at Marworth.

== Education ==
Scranton began his education at the Scranton Country Day School, which had been founded by his parents, completing his basic schooling at the Fessenden School in Newton, Massachusetts, and attended the prestigious Hotchkiss School in Lakeville, Connecticut. Scranton graduated from Yale University in 1939. While at Yale, he was a member of the Yale Political Union and the Chi Psi fraternity, where he became friends with another fraternity brother from Delta Kappa Epsilon, future U.S. President Gerald Ford, and of the Berzelius Secret Senior Society (pictured with his Berzelius Class of '39 as

== Military service ==
Scranton attended Yale Law School from 1939 to 1941, dropping out in advance of World War II, enlisting in the United States Army Air Corps and serving as an Air Transport Command pilot during the war. Although he did not serve in combat, he was assigned to aircraft mobilization and pilot training duties, and was stationed on three different continents during his tour of duty, including South America, Africa, and Asia. On July 6, 1942, he married Mary Lowe Chamberlain (1918–2015). The couple had four children, a daughter and three sons, Susan, William Worthington, Joseph Curtis and Peter Kip. He was honorably discharged from the military as a captain, but was active in the U.S. Air Force Reserves for two decades thereafter. Following the war, he resumed his studies at Yale Law School. He graduated in 1946 and was admitted to the Pennsylvania bar in August of that year.

== Early career ==
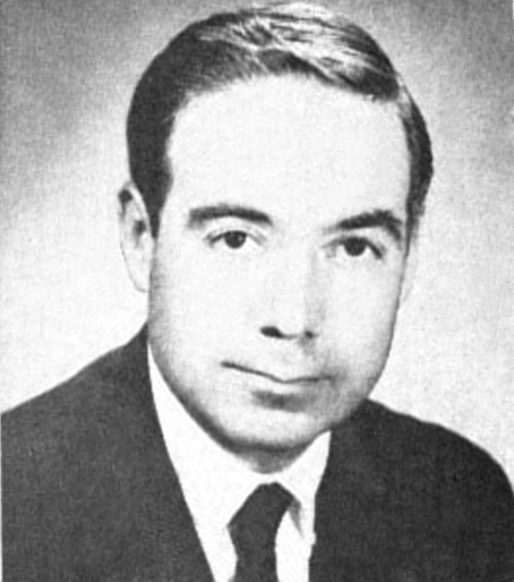
Scranton's official congressional photo

Scranton practiced law and then entered the business community after the war becoming successful in several firms in northeastern Pennsylvania. He joined the largest correspondence school in the United States, International Correspondence Schools in 1949 as its Vice President for legal affairs. He left that post in 1954, but later served on the board of directors, as had his father. He became active in Republican Party politics in the 1950s and came to the attention of President Dwight Eisenhower. In 1959, Eisenhower appointed Scranton as a special assistant to U.S. Secretary of State John Foster Dulles and later Christian Herter. Scranton served a little over a year before resigning to run for Congress.

Scranton's name recognition and family connections helped him win a 17,000 vote victory over incumbent Stanley Prokop in a largely Democratic district in 1960. Scranton represented Pennsylvania's 10th Congressional District in the U.S. House of Representatives from 1961 to 1963. Though a freshman Republican, he quickly gained a reputation as an outspoken moderate and supported much of President John F. Kennedy's social agenda including his legislative agenda for the Civil Rights Movement and the Peace Corps. The media quickly dubbed him a "Kennedy Republican."

== 1962 gubernatorial election ==
In 1962, the Pennsylvania Republican Party, which had lost the two previous gubernatorial elections and seen the state's electoral votes go to Kennedy in the 1960 presidential election, became convinced that a moderate like Scranton, would have enough bipartisan appeal to revitalize the party. He ran for governor against Richardson Dilworth, the mayor of Philadelphia. The ticket added Raymond Shafer, who would succeed him as governor, as his running mate. After one of the most acrimonious campaigns in state history, Scranton and Shafer won a huge victory in the election against their opponents by nearly half a million votes, out of just over 6.6 million cast.

== Governor of Pennsylvania ==
Economic conditions improved for Pennsylvania residents statewide under Scranton's leadership as "unemployment went from 7.5 percent to 3.6 percent," and the "average blue-collar weekly paycheck increased nearly $23 over the four years," according to the Pittsburgh Post-Gazette. Restricted by state law to just one term as governor during his time in office, Scranton increased state government spending to a then-record $5.21 billion over his term, compared to $3.78 billion by his predecessor." He also signed into law sweeping reforms in the state's education system, which created the state community college system, the state board of education and the state Higher Education Assistance Agency, and he established a program to promote the state in national and international markets and increase the attractiveness of the state's products and services.

The Chester school protests in Chester, Pennsylvania, in the spring of 1964 led by George Raymond of the National Association for the Advancement of Colored People (NAACP) and Stanley Branche of the Committee for Freedom Now (CFFN) against the de facto segregation of public schools prompted Scranton to implement the Pennsylvania Human Relations commission. All protests were discontinued while the commission held hearings during the summer of 1964. Scranton also supported the formation of the Greater Chester Movement, an umbrella organization intended to coordinate activities of groups working toward the betterment of Chester

While he was governor, the largest manhunt in the history of Pennsylvania until then took place. On May 11, 1966, Peggy Ann Bradnick was kidnapped near Shade Gap. Pennsylvania State Police, FBI agents, local law enforcement, and civilian volunteers scoured the mountains around Shade Gap and Burnt Cabins. On May 17, the kidnapper, William Diller Hollenbaugh, shot and killed FBI Agent Terry Ray Anderson. On May 18, Hollenbaugh shot and wounded Cambria County Deputy Sheriff Francis Sharpe. There was a shootout at Rubeck's farm in Burnt Cabins and Hollenbaugh was killed; Peggy Ann Bradnick was rescued without serious injury.

== 1964 presidential election ==
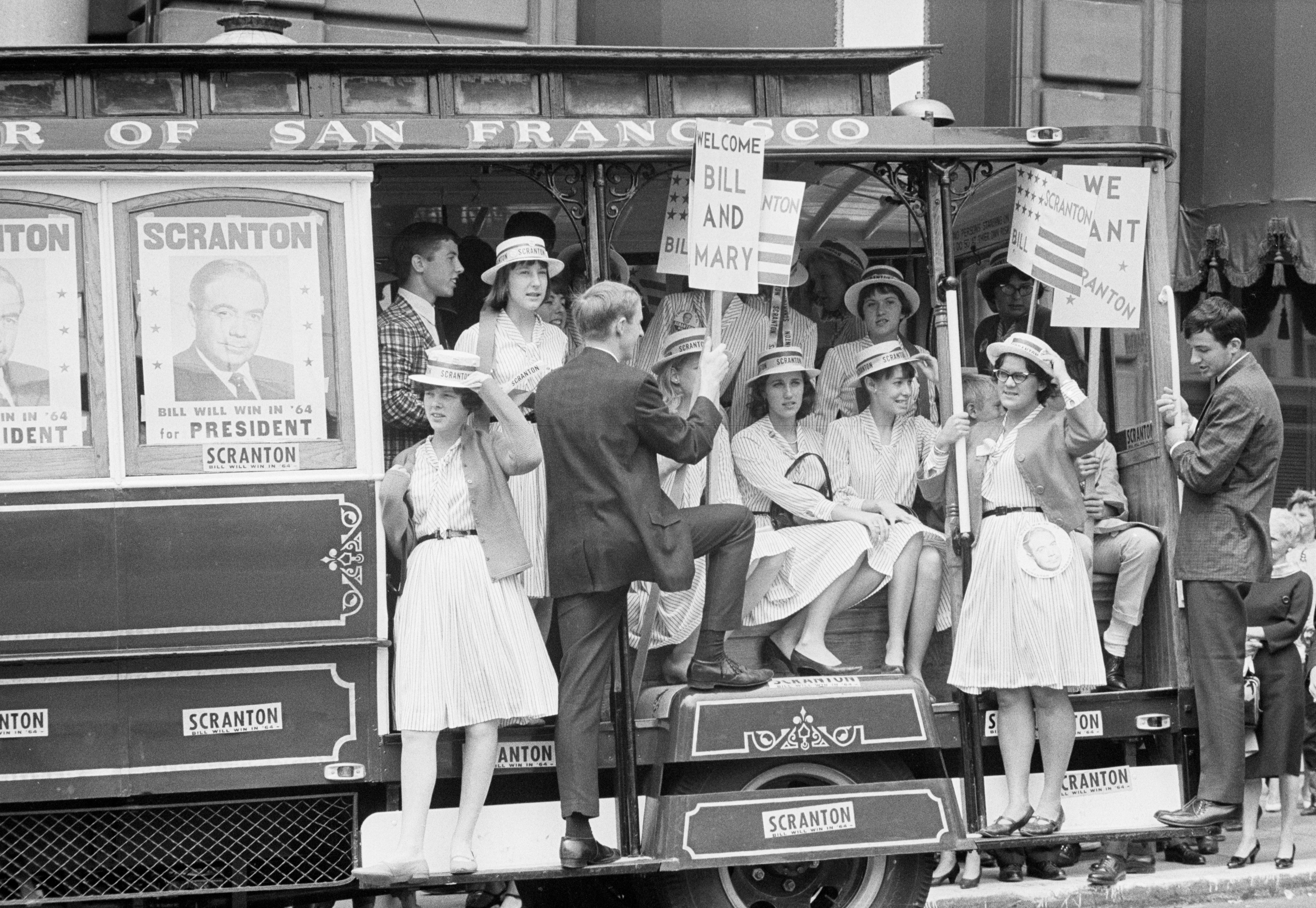
Scranton supporters ride a San Francisco cable car during the 1964 Republican National Convention

Although Scranton did not actively seek the 1964 Republican nomination for President of the United States in the beginning, a "Draft Scranton" movement quickly gathered momentum among moderate and liberal Republicans who saw him as an alternative to conservative frontrunner, Senator Barry Goldwater, and other Republicans who feared that Goldwater's polarizing views would lead to defeat, after the campaign of Goldwater's liberal opponent, New York governor Nelson Rockefeller, had lost steam. Early in the campaign, he announced that he would be willing to accept the nomination for Vice President. Scranton first declined to enter the race but later threw his hat into the ring on June 12, 1964. Scranton won the support of ten state delegations, but Goldwater went on to win the nomination on the first ballot. Republican National Committee Chairman and US Representative William E. Miller of New York was nominated for Vice President.

== Later career ==
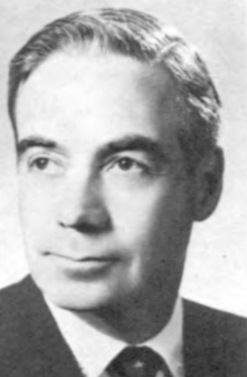
Scranton in 1976.

Under the then-existing Pennsylvania law, Scranton was limited to a single term and could not run for reelection in 1966. That same year, he announced that he would never again seek elected office. After his term in office, Scranton attended the Pennsylvania Constitutional Convention of 1967-1968 and helped write a new constitution for the state, which included a provision allowing future governors to seek a second term. Following the 1968 United States presidential election, President-elect Richard Nixon asked Scranton to become Secretary of State, but he declined. He did serve as a special envoy to the Middle East but when he said the Nixon Administration should be "more evenhanded" in managing the problems of the Middle East, some in the American Jewish community regarded this as antisemitic and Nixon quickly distanced himself from the former governor. In accordance with his 1966 pledge never to seek elected office, he rebuffed a draft movement encouraging him to run for the U.S. Senate.

After the Kent State shootings in 1970, Scranton was asked to chair the President's Commission on Campus Unrest to investigate this and other incidents of campus violence and protest. The committee's conclusions came to be known as the "Scranton Report".

Following Nixon's resignation from the Presidency in 1974, he was appointed as a transition team member for incoming President Gerald Ford.

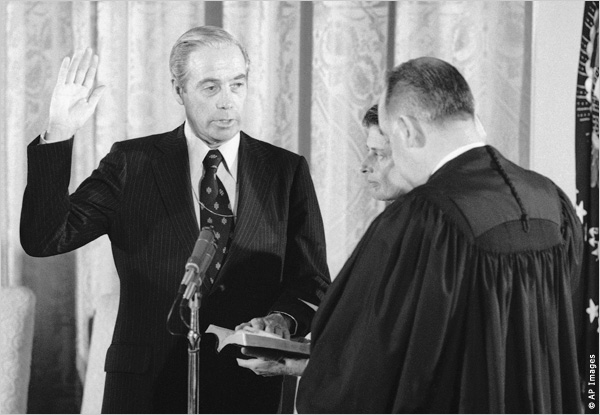
Scranton swearing-in as US Rep to the UN

Scranton reentered the business world and served on the boards of several high-profile American corporations such as A&P, IBM, The New York Times, Pan American Airways, and the H.J. Heinz Company and was president of Northeastern National Bank and Trust Company. He was also associated with the Trilateral Commission, the Council on Foreign Relations, and was a trustee of Yale University, his alma mater.

=== Ambassador to the United Nations ===
In 1976, Scranton was chosen by President Ford to become United States Ambassador to the United Nations. He was sworn-in in the Oval Office on March 15, 1976. His measured approach to diplomacy and genuine interest in human rights earned him much respect in his short time in office. Some in the Republican Party pushed for Scranton to be named Ford's running mate for the 1976 presidential election, but Ford chose Senator Robert Dole of Kansas instead. After his term as UN Ambassador, Scranton retired to his home in Dalton, Pennsylvania.

Scranton's son, William Scranton III, served as Lieutenant Governor of Pennsylvania under Richard Thornburgh. He ran unsuccessfully for governor in the 1986 election and was for a while considered a leading candidate for the Republican gubernatorial nomination in the 2006 election but ultimately dropped out of the race.

Scranton was elected to the American Philosophical Society in 1997.

== Death and legacy ==
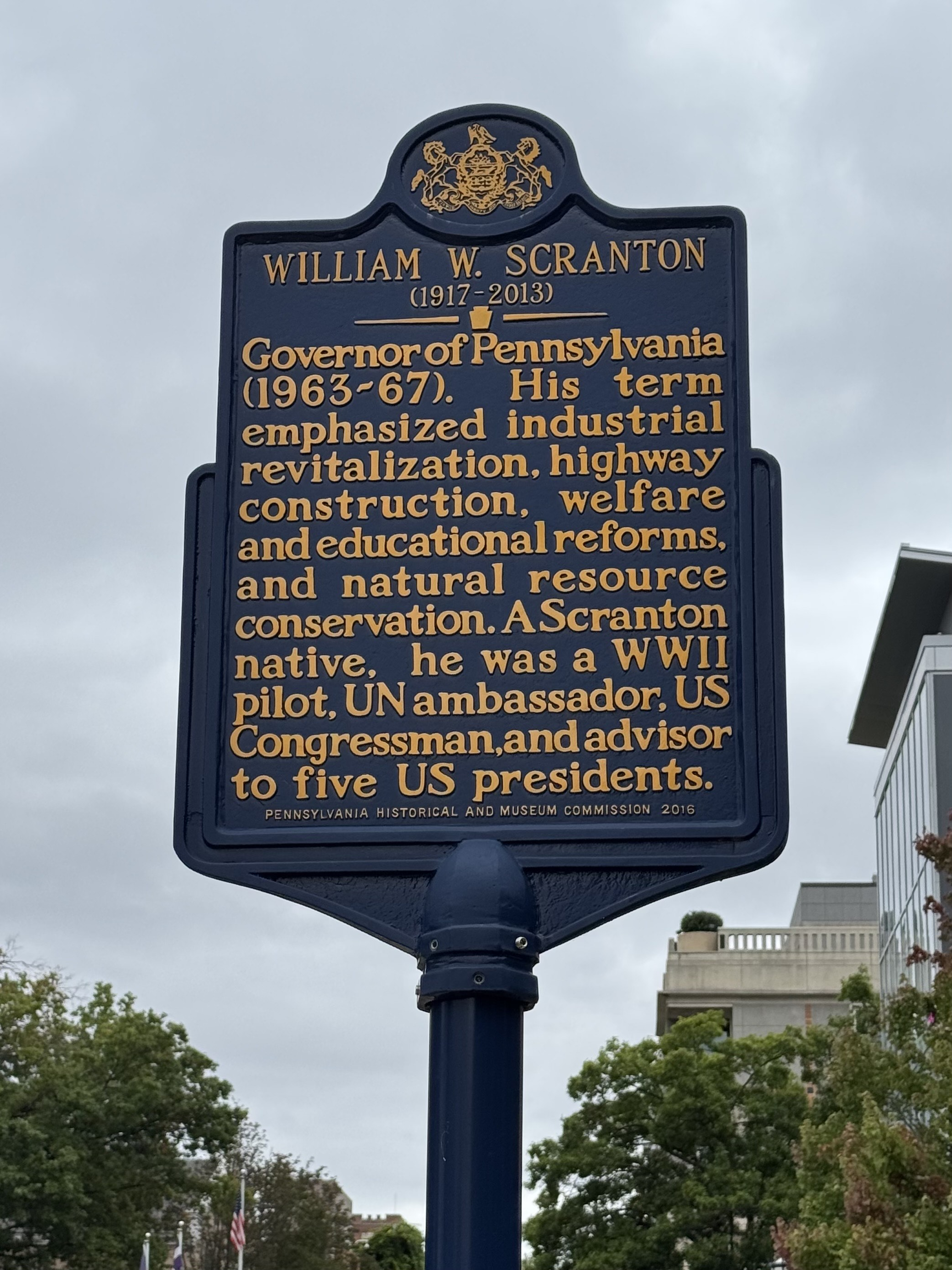
A Pennsylvania state historical marker commemorating Scranton

Nine days after his 96th birthday, Scranton died on July 28, 2013, from a cerebral hemorrhage at a retirement community in Montecito, California, where he lived with his wife. His widow, Mary Scranton, the former First Lady of Pennsylvania, died from Alzheimer's disease on December 26, 2015, at the age of 97.

"Many who serve as governor today are still measured against Bill Scranton's leadership - some 50 years later," said former state Republican National Committeewoman Elsie Hillman when she learned of Scranton's death.

== In popular culture ==
In Jeff Greenfield's alternate history book If Kennedy Lived, Scranton is featured as Senator Barry Goldwater's running mate in the 1964 presidential election, instead of William E. Miller.

== See also ==
- Scranton family

U.S. House of Representatives
Preceded by Stanley Prokop	Member of the U.S. House of Representatives from Pennsylvania's 10th congressional district 1961–1963	Succeeded by Joseph McDade
Party political offices
Preceded by Art McGonigle	Republican nominee for Governor of Pennsylvania; 1962	Succeeded by Raymond Shafer
Political offices
Preceded by David Lawrence	Governor of Pennsylvania; 1963–1967	Succeeded by Ray Shafer
Non-profit organization positions
Preceded by Alfred Driscoll	President of the National Civic League; 1970–1972	Succeeded by Wilson Wyatt
Diplomatic posts
Preceded by Daniel Patrick Moynihan	United States Ambassador to the United Nations; 1976–1977	Succeeded by Andrew Young
