= William Scranton III =

Pennsylvania politician

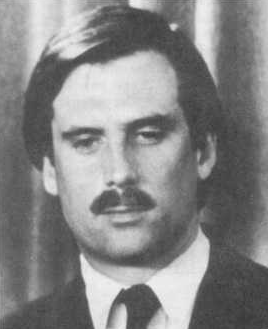
- Scranton in 1979

26th Lieutenant Governor of Pennsylvania
- In office January 16, 1979 – January 20, 1987
- Governor: Dick Thornburgh
- Preceded by: Ernest Kline
- Succeeded by: Mark Singel

24th Chair of the National Lieutenant Governors Association
- In office 1983–1984
- Preceded by: Martha Layne Collins
- Succeeded by: Zell Miller

Personal details
- Born: William Worthington Scranton III; July 20, 1947 (age 79) Scranton, Pennsylvania, U.S.
- Party: Republican
- Parents: William Scranton; Mary Chamberlin
- Relatives: Scranton family
- Education: Yale University

William Worthington Scranton III (born July 20, 1947) is an American politician who served as the 26th lieutenant governor of Pennsylvania from 1979 to 1987 in the administration of Governor Richard Thornburgh. He is the son of the late Pennsylvania Governor William Scranton, and a member of the wealthy and politically influential Scranton family, the founders of Scranton, Pennsylvania.

== Early life ==
Scranton was born in Scranton, Pennsylvania, the son of the late Pennsylvania Governor William Scranton and the late First Lady of Pennsylvania Mary Scranton. He attended Yale University. After college he became the editor of a local newspaper in Mountaintop, Pennsylvania. In 1970, he went to Europe to study Maharishi Mahesh Yogi's Transcendental Meditation, and became a lifelong practitioner of the Transcendental Meditation technique. He then became president and managing editor of the Greenstreet News Company. He entered politics as a member of the Republican State Committee in 1976.

== Political career ==
=== Lieutenant Governor 1979–1987 ===
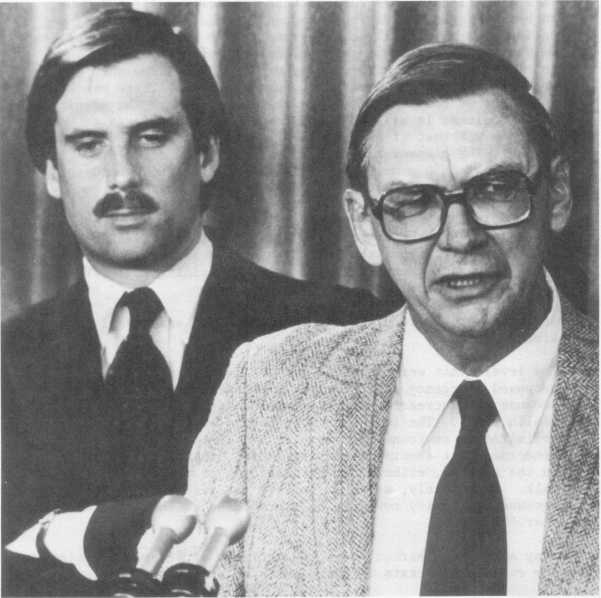
Scranton (L) and Oran Henderson (R) at a press conference on the Three Mile Island incident in October 1979.

In 1978, he won the Republican primary for lieutenant governor and later that year became the youngest person ever elected lieutenant governor in Pennsylvania. His dual role as chairman of the Governor's Energy Council and chairman of the Pennsylvania Emergency Management Council put him at the center of the Three Mile Island Nuclear Generating Station crisis in 1979. At one point during the crisis, Scranton visited the plant's auxiliary building, where he donned protective clothing and walked through corridors flooded with radioactive water.

As lieutenant governor, Scranton hired Nat Goldhaber, a member of the Transcendental Meditation movement, as his top aide in Harrisburg. In 1982, he was unanimously elected as Chairman of the National Conference of Lieutenant Governors.

=== Candidate for governor 1986 ===
During his final term as lieutenant governor, Scranton ran for Governor of Pennsylvania in 1986 against Democratic former Auditor General Bob Casey Sr. The race was virtually tied until five days before election day when Casey's media consultants, led by a young James Carville, launched the now-infamous "guru" ad. This television advertisement portrayed Scranton as having been a regular drug user in the 1960s and mocked Scranton's interest in transcendental meditation and his ties to Maharishi Mahesh Yogi. The image of Scranton as a "long haired, dope-smoking hippie" is seen by political observers as having tipped the scales against Scranton in the socially conservative rural sections of Pennsylvania. Casey went on to win the election by a narrow margin of 79,216 out of 3.3 million votes cast.

=== Candidate for governor 2006 ===
On October 17, 2005, Scranton formally announced his candidacy for the Republican nomination for Governor of Pennsylvania in 2006. After it became clear that Scranton would not win the Pennsylvania Republican Party endorsement, his campaign called for Pennsylvania change to an "open primary" election. Scranton dismissed his first two prior campaign managers over strategy issues.

In January 2006 Scranton fired his third campaign manager, Jim Seif, after Seif criticized Scranton's African American opponent, Lynn Swann, during a television interview saying, "the rich white guy in this campaign is Lynn Swann." In February 2006, after his request for an open primary was denied, Scranton withdrew from the race.

== Private sector ==
After losing the 1986 election, Scranton exited politics and managed some California companies and start-up firms. He returned to Pennsylvania in 1994 to spend time with his family.

Scranton served on the board of directors for a number of Pennsylvania companies. He was chairman of the Board of the Harleysville Group of Insurance Companies. He also co-founded and co-chaired the Great Valley Technology Alliance.

In 1992, Scranton donated $1,000 to the campaign of his friend John Hagelin, the Pittsburgh-born presidential candidate for the Transcendental Meditation-backed Natural Law Party. Scranton says he has always supported Republicans.

He has maintained a presence in the political arena, creating a new political action committee (GrowPAC), speaking at the annual Pennsylvania Leadership Conference and testifying before the State House of Representatives budget hearing. In May 2007, Scranton joined the board of directors for the Commonwealth Foundation, a Harrisburg public policy research center. Scranton was a potential candidate in the 2010 gubernatorial election, but, in August 2009, effectively ended speculation he would enter the race by endorsing 6th district Congressman Jim Gerlach for governor.

== Notes ==
Political offices
Preceded by Ernest Kline	Lieutenant Governor of Pennsylvania; 1979–1987	Succeeded by Mark Singel
Party political offices
Preceded by Kenneth Lee	Republican nominee for Lieutenant Governor of Pennsylvania; 1978, 1982	Succeeded by Mike Fisher
Preceded by Dick Thornburgh	Republican nominee for Governor of Pennsylvania; 1986	Succeeded by Barbara Hafer
