= William Walker Scranton =

American businessman

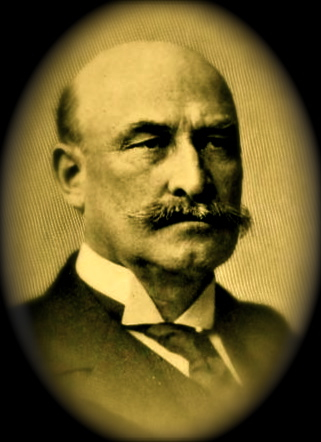
- Born: April 4, 1844; Augusta, Georgia, U.S.
- Died: December 3, 1916 (aged 72)
- Burial place: Dunmore Cemetery, Dunmore, Pennsylvania, U.S.
- Occupation: businessman
- Spouse: Katherine Maria Smith
- Children: Worthington Scranton

William Walker Scranton (April 4, 1844 – December 3, 1916) was an American businessman based in Scranton, Pennsylvania. He became president and manager of the Lackawanna Iron and Coal Company after his father's death in 1872. The company had been founded by his father's cousin George W. Scranton. Among his innovations, Scranton adopted the Bessemer process for his operations in 1876, greatly increasing production of steel ties with a new mill. Scranton founded the Scranton Steel Company, in 1891 consolidated as Lackawanna Iron and Steel Company. The steel company became the second largest in the nation. He later also managed the Scranton Gas and Water Company, developing a secure water supply outside the city by creating Lake Scranton.

William W. Scranton managed the Lackawanna works during and after the Scranton general strike of 1877.

In 1902 Lackawanna Steel Company moved to a location south of Buffalo, New York on Lake Erie for access to new production of iron ore being shipped from Minnesota. The city of Lackawanna, New York was named after the company. Scranton stayed in his home city, working to develop companies and infrastructure.

== Early life and education ==
William Walker Scranton was born in 1844 in Augusta, Georgia, the oldest of six children of Joseph Hand Scranton of Connecticut and his second wife Cornelia Walker (February 22, 1823 – February 22, 1895), "ten years his junior, and the youngest daughter and child of the late Judge William P. Walker of Lenox, Massachusetts." Joseph Scranton started in business in Augusta, moving his family in 1847 to Scranton, Pennsylvania. He had invested the year before in an ironworks started by two of his cousins, brothers George and Selden T. Scranton. J. H. Scranton's investment in their firm in 1846 saved the firm from bankruptcy. He later became president of Lackawanna Iron & Coal, serving until his death in 1872.

William was the oldest of six children, with two brothers and three sisters, all of whom were born after the family's move to Pennsylvania. They also had an older half-brother Joseph A. Scranton. He attended Scranton High, moving to Phillips Andover to complete preparation for college. William Scranton graduated from Yale in 1865. There he rowed crew as one of his sports.

== Marriage and family ==
He married Katherine Maria Smith on October 15, 1874 in St. Albans, Vermont. She was the daughter of Worthington Curtis Smith and Katherine (Walworth) Smith. They had one son, Worthington Scranton, who was born in Scranton, Pennsylvania, on August 29, 1876.

== Industrial Scranton ==
Scranton's father Joseph became president of Lackawanna Iron & Coal after George's death in 1861. Selden Scranton had already returned in 1858 to Oxford Furnace in New Jersey. William Scranton started working in the family business after his return from Yale, and took over its management after his father's death in 1872. He had to struggle with economic disruptions after the Panic of 1873, which had effects for years and caused a downturn.

In 1874 Scranton traveled to Europe to study the new Bessemer process for making steel ties, which was being used by England, France and Germany; it had been developed in England by Henry Bessemer. From 1866 to 1877, eleven Bessemer mills were licensed in the United States. In 1876 Scranton built a new mill at the Lackawanna works for the Bessemer method. As a result, it "doubled capacity and quadrupled its output." The company became one of the top producers of steel in the United States.

Scranton was leading the company during the economic downturn in the 1870s, and through the disturbances of the Scranton General Strike of 1877. Workers from the railroad, mines and other industries walked out in protest of wage cuts, and associated with the Great Railroad Strike of that year, as labor unrest spread across the nation.

In a dispute over control of the family company, Scranton in 1880 quit Lackawanna Iron and Coal Co., which had become the nation’s second-largest producer of iron. "He formed the Scranton Steel Co. and within a decade, Scranton Steel was so successful that it forced a merger with Lackawanna Iron and Coal. It became Lackawanna Iron and Steel and retired its founding $1.2 million debt within a year."

Beginning in 1891, Scranton worked to develop Scranton Gas & Water, founded by his father in 1858. Although it had in the early decades taken water from the Lackawanna River, industrial pollution spoiled that source. To secure a supply of quality water outside the city, Scranton dammed Stafford Meadow Brook, creating what was commonly known as Lake Scranton. He had a road built around it and a building for overlook and recreation by the public. The reservoir held 2.5 billion gallons.

Scranton supported the Scranton Surface Protection Association, founded in 1913 to combat collapse of city streets and neighborhoods caused by underground mining, and force mining companies to compensate for losses. He contributed $10,000 to its efforts.

== Death and legacy ==
Scranton is interred in the family chapel at Dunmore Cemetery in Dunmore, Pennsylvania, where his father was also interred. His wake was attended by thousands, and his funeral by hundreds, including numerous employees from his businesses, friends and family, and dignitaries, inckuding former Vermont governor Edward Curtis Smith and his wife, who were close friends.

In 1928, his son Worthington Scranton sold the family business and became a substantial philanthropist to the city and state. William's grandson, William Warren Scranton, became a congressman from Pennsylvania and then was elected as governor of Pennsylvania, serving from 1963 to 1967. He was then appointed U.S. ambassador to the United Nations, serving from 1976 to 1977. His grandson, William Worthington Scranton III served as the 26th lieutenant governor of Pennsylvania from 1979 to 1987.
