= Scranton, Pennsylvania =

City in Pennsylvania, United States

- City
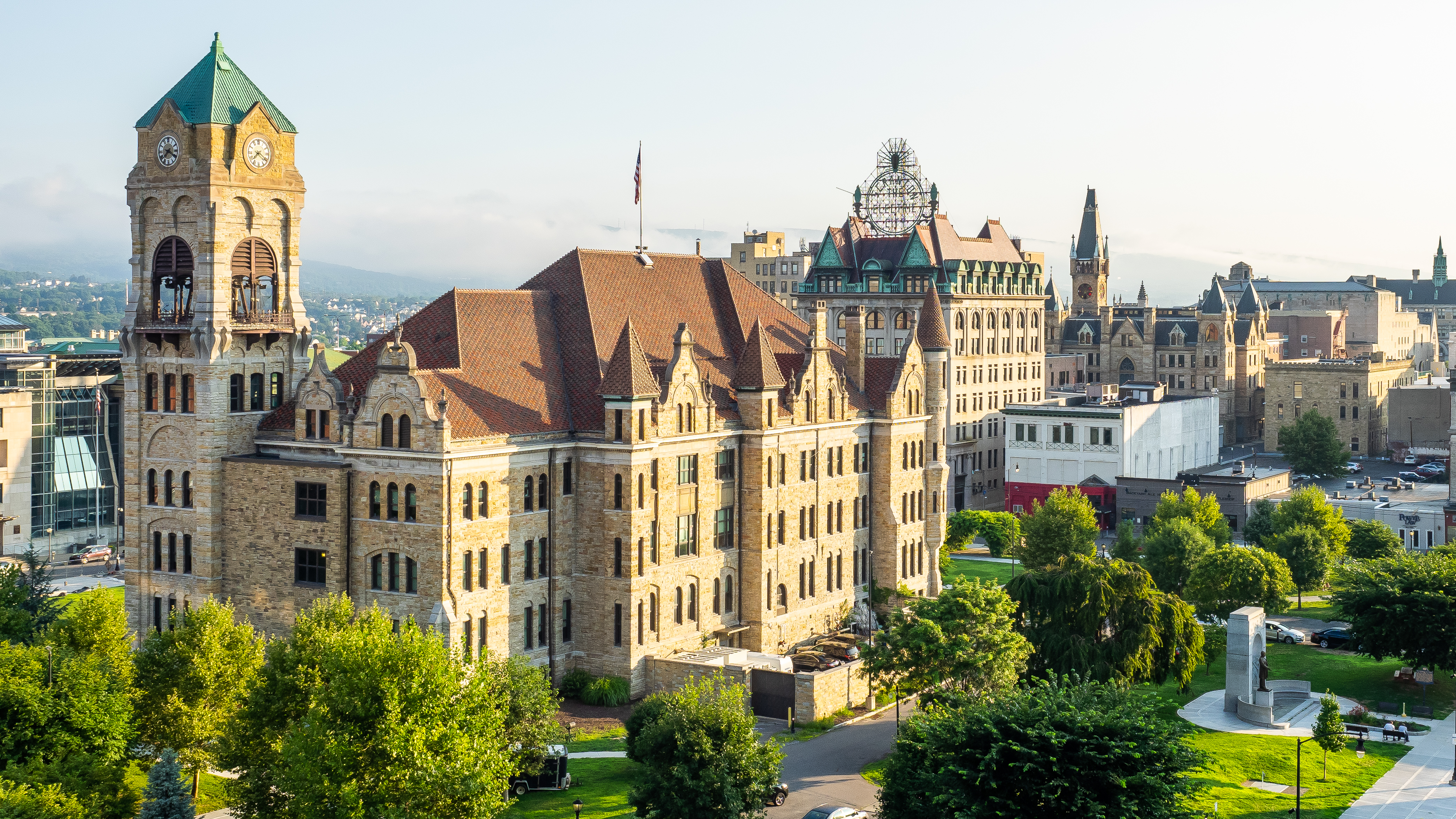
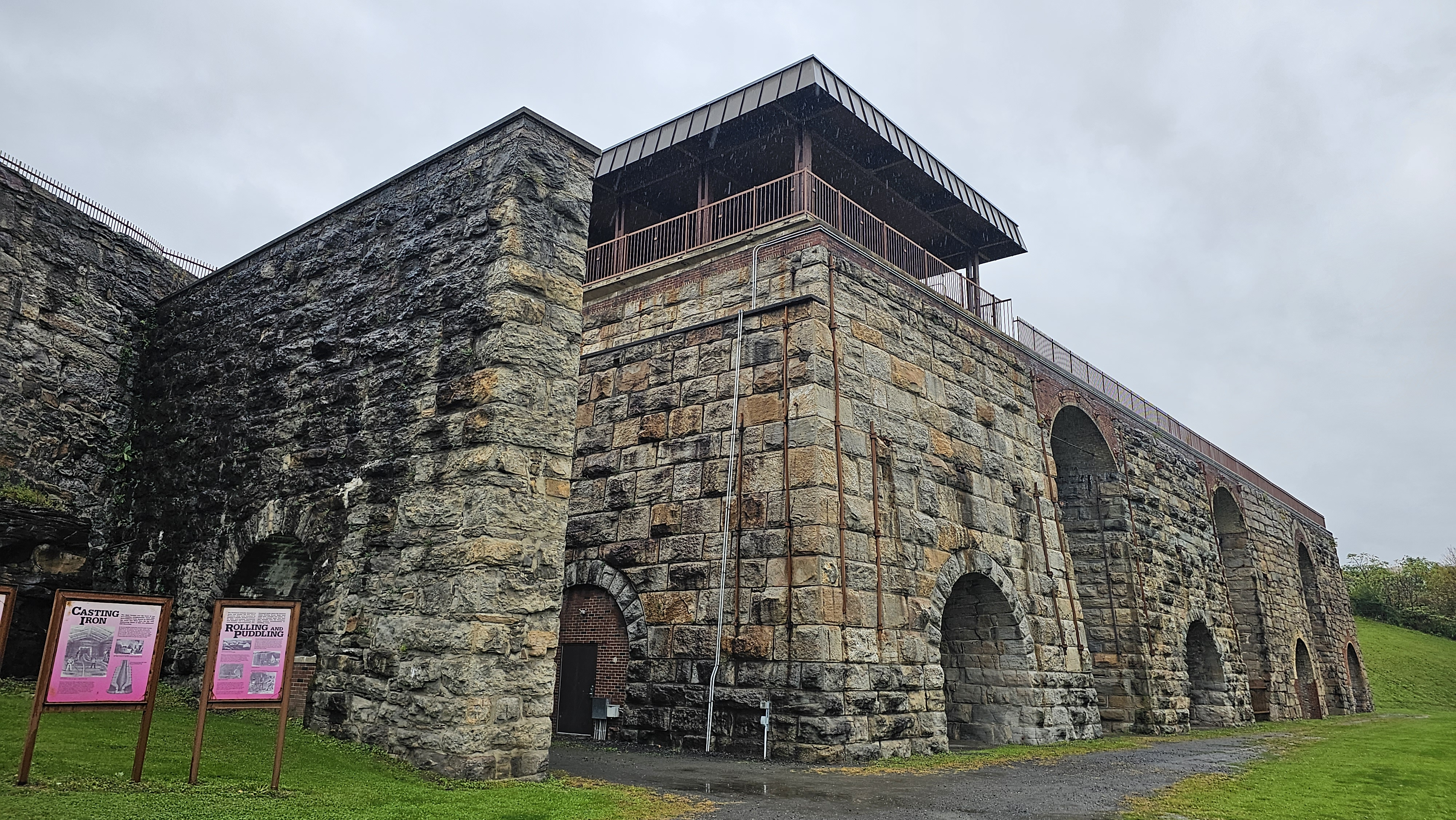
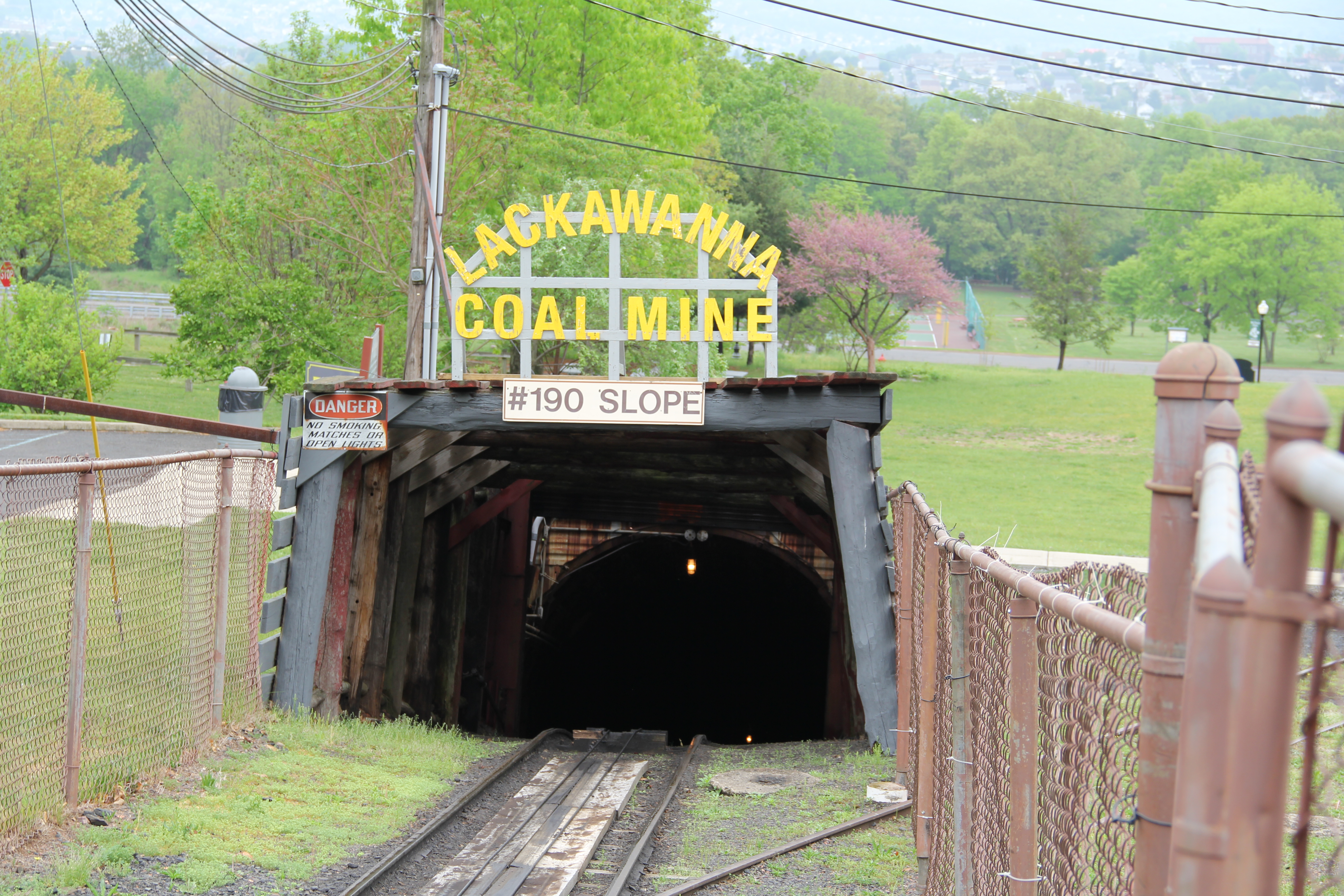
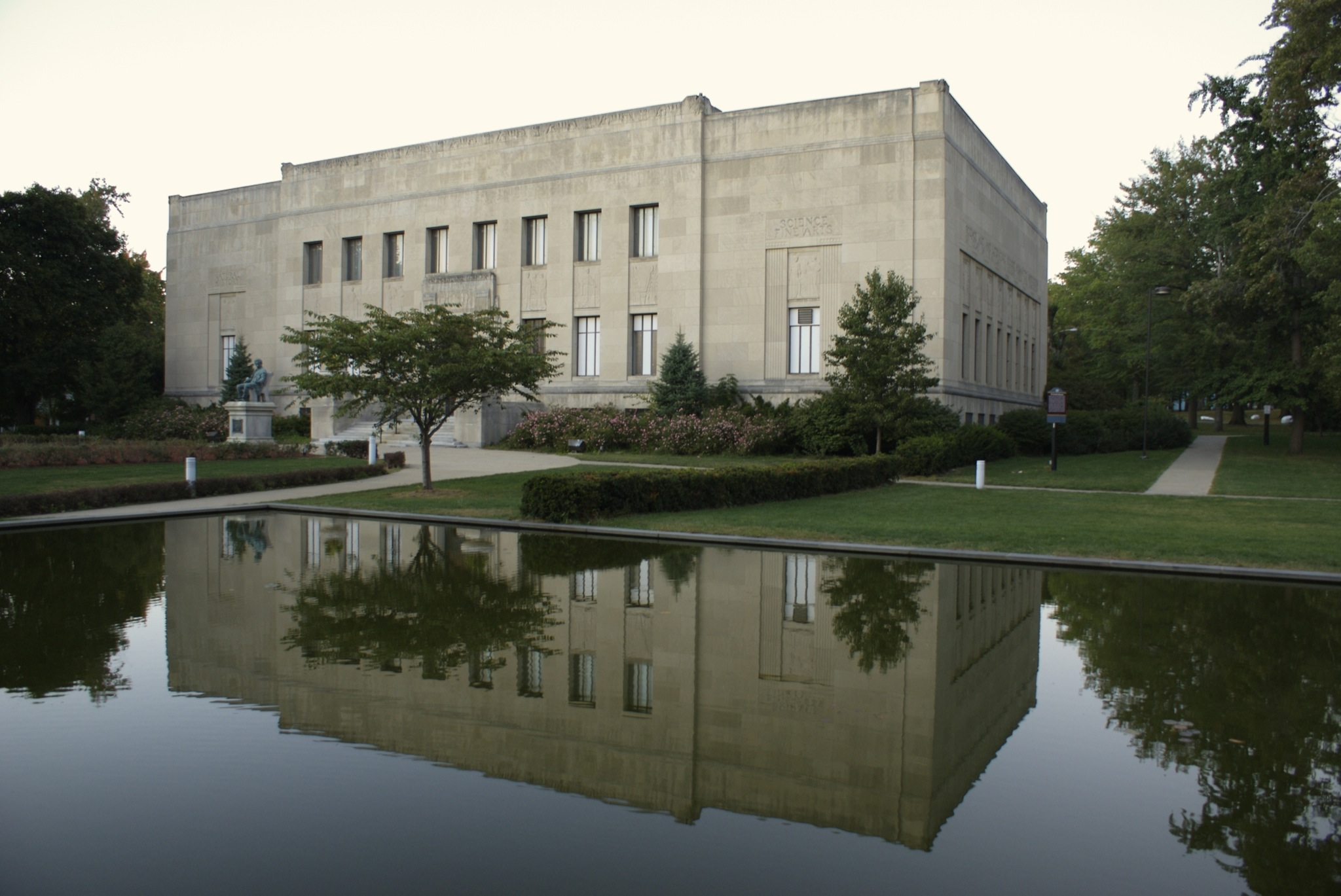
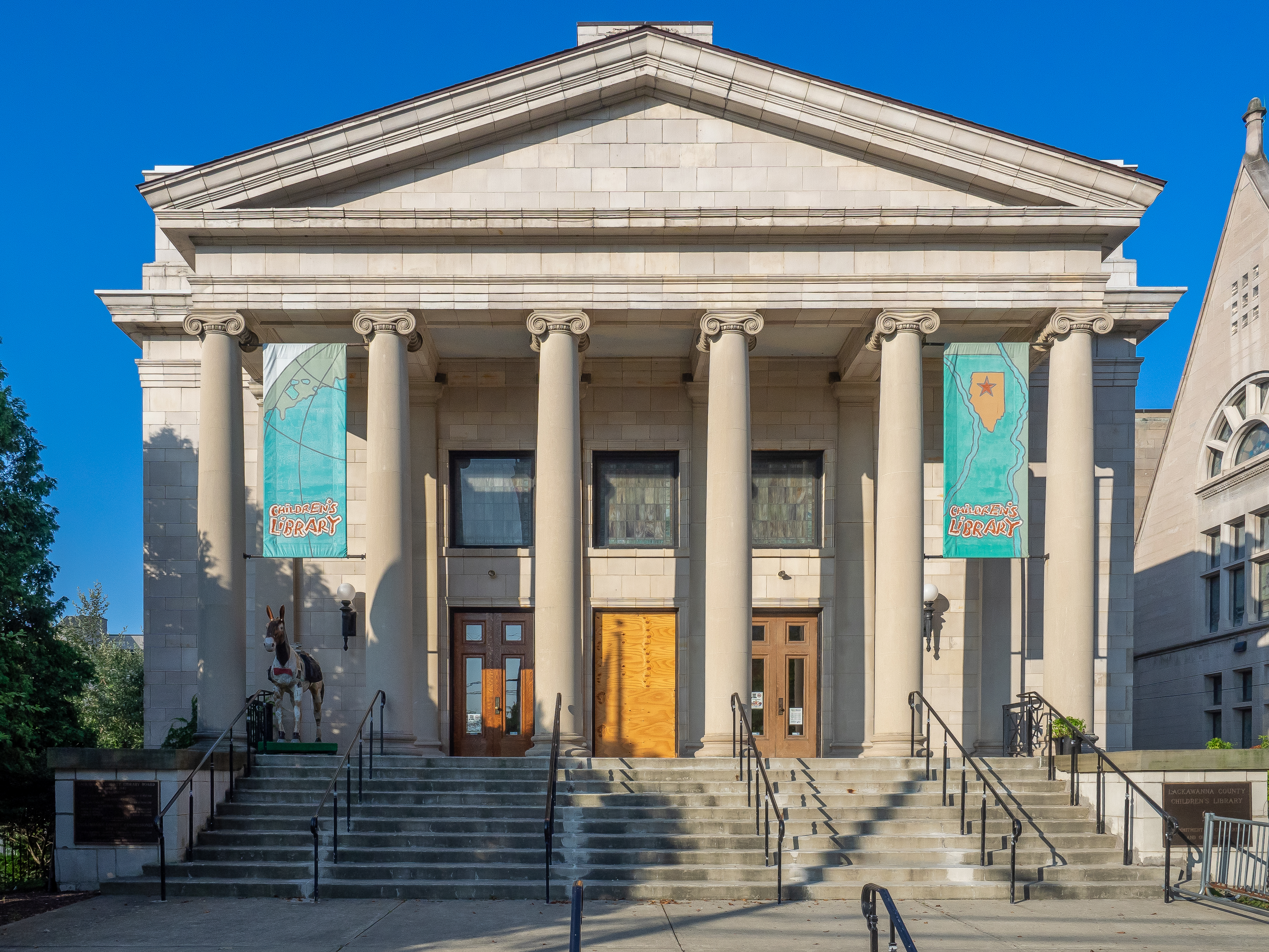
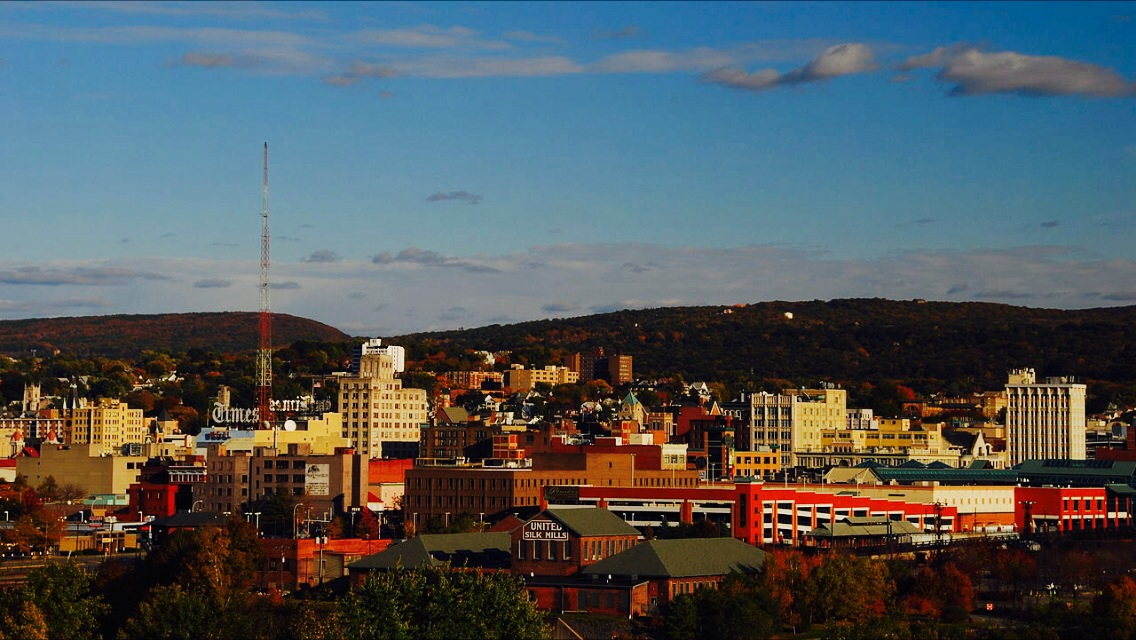
- Courthouse Square Scranton Iron Furnaces Lackawanna Coal Mine Everhart Museum Lackawanna County Children's Library Downtown Scranton

- Logo
- Nicknames: The Electric City, The All America City, Steamtown, The Anthracite Capital of the World
- Motto: Embracing Our People, Our Traditions and Our Future
- Anthem: "Hail, Pennsylvania!"
- Interactive map of Scranton, Pennsylvania
- Location within Pennsylvania Location within the United States
- Coordinates: 41°24′38″N 75°40′03″W
- Country: United States
- State: Pennsylvania
- County: Lackawanna
- Region: Greater Scranton
- Incorporated (borough): February 14, 1856
- Incorporated (city): April 23, 1866
- Named for: George W. Scranton

Government
  - Type: Mayor-Council
  - Body: Scranton City Council
  - Mayor: Paige Cognetti (D)

Area
  - City: 25.54 sq mi (66.14 km^{2})
  - Land: 25.31 sq mi (65.55 km^{2})
  - Water: 0.23 sq mi (0.60 km^{2})
  - Metro: 1,777 sq mi (4,602 km^{2})
- Elevation: 745 ft (227 m)

Population (2020)
  - City: 76,328
  - Estimate (2025): 75,514
  - Rank: 1st in Northeastern Pennsylvania; 6th in Pennsylvania
  - Density: 3,016.0/sq mi (1,164.49/km^{2})
  - Urban: 366,713 (US: 113th)
  - Urban density: 2,261/sq mi (873.1/km^{2})
  - Metro: 567,559 (US: 100th)
- Demonym: Scrantonian/Scrantonite
- Time zone: UTC– 05:00 (EST)
  - Summer (DST): UTC– 04:00 (EDT)
- ZIP Codes: 18447, 18501–18505, 18507–18510, 18512, 18514–18515, 18517–18519, 18522, 18540, 18577
- Area codes: 570 and 272
- FIPS code: 42-69000
- GNIS feature ID: 634293
- Website: www.scrantonpa.gov

Scranton is a second A class city in and the county seat of Lackawanna County, Pennsylvania, United States. With a population of 76,328 at the 2020 census (estimated at 75,514 in 2025), Scranton is the sixth-most populous city in Pennsylvania and the most populous city in Northeastern Pennsylvania. It is part of the Wyoming Valley metropolitan area, which includes five cities and more than 40 boroughs forming a contiguous urban corridor with an estimated 574,000 residents. It is located 56 miles (90 km) north of Allentown, 104 miles (167 km) north-northwest of Philadelphia, and 99 miles (159 km) west-northwest of New York City.

Scranton is located in the Lackawanna River valley and was historically the largest of several anthracite coal mining communities in the area, including Wilkes-Barre and Nanticoke. It was incorporated as a borough in 1856 and as a city in 1866, later becoming the seat of the newly formed Lackawanna County in 1878. The city contains a federal courthouse for the United States District Court for the Middle District of Pennsylvania. The city is conventionally divided into nine districts, namely North Scranton, Southside, Westside, Eastside/Hill Section, Central City, Minooka, West Mountain, East Mountain, and Green Ridge.

Scranton was a major center for industry, mining, and rail transport in the late 19th and early 20th centuries. It was one of the first cities in the United States to implement electric streetcars, earning the nickname "Electric City". It was the site of the 1877 Scranton general strike. The city's industrial output peaked during the 1930s and 1940s, particularly during World War II, but declined in the postwar period due to reduced demand for coal and changes in the energy sector. The 1959 Knox Mine disaster effectively ended coal mining in the region. Scranton's population fell from a peak of 143,433 in 1930 to 76,089 in 2010, with a slight increase recorded by 2020.

== History ==
=== 18th century ===
In 1771, during the colonial era, Isaac Tripp, the area's first known white settler, built his home here; it still stands in North Scranton, formerly a separate town known as Providence. More settlers from Connecticut Colony came to the area in the late 18th and early 19th centuries following the end of the American Revolutionary War, since their state claimed the area as part of their colonial charter.

They gradually established mills and other small businesses in a village that became known as Slocum Hollow, as well as Deep Hollow. People in the village during this time carried the traits and accent of their New England settlers, which were somewhat different from most of Pennsylvania. Some area settlers from Connecticut participated in what was known as the Pennamite Wars, where settlers competed for control of the territory which had been included in royal colonial land grants to both states. The claim between Connecticut and Pennsylvania was settled by negotiation with the federal government's involvement after the Revolutionary War.

=== 19th century ===
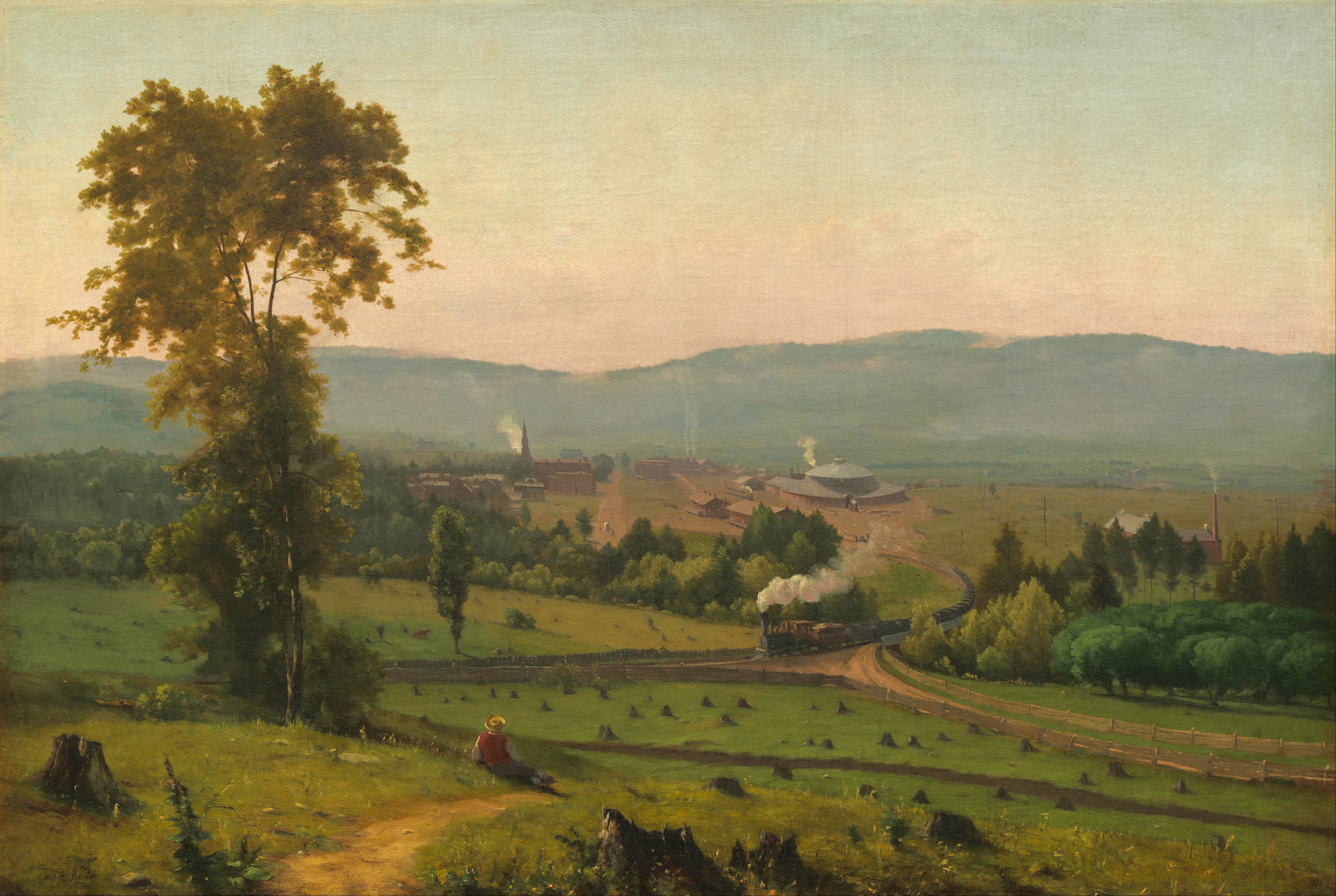
The Lackawanna Valley, an 1855 portrait by George Inness depicting 19th century Scranton and the Delaware, Lackawanna and Western Railroad's roundhouse

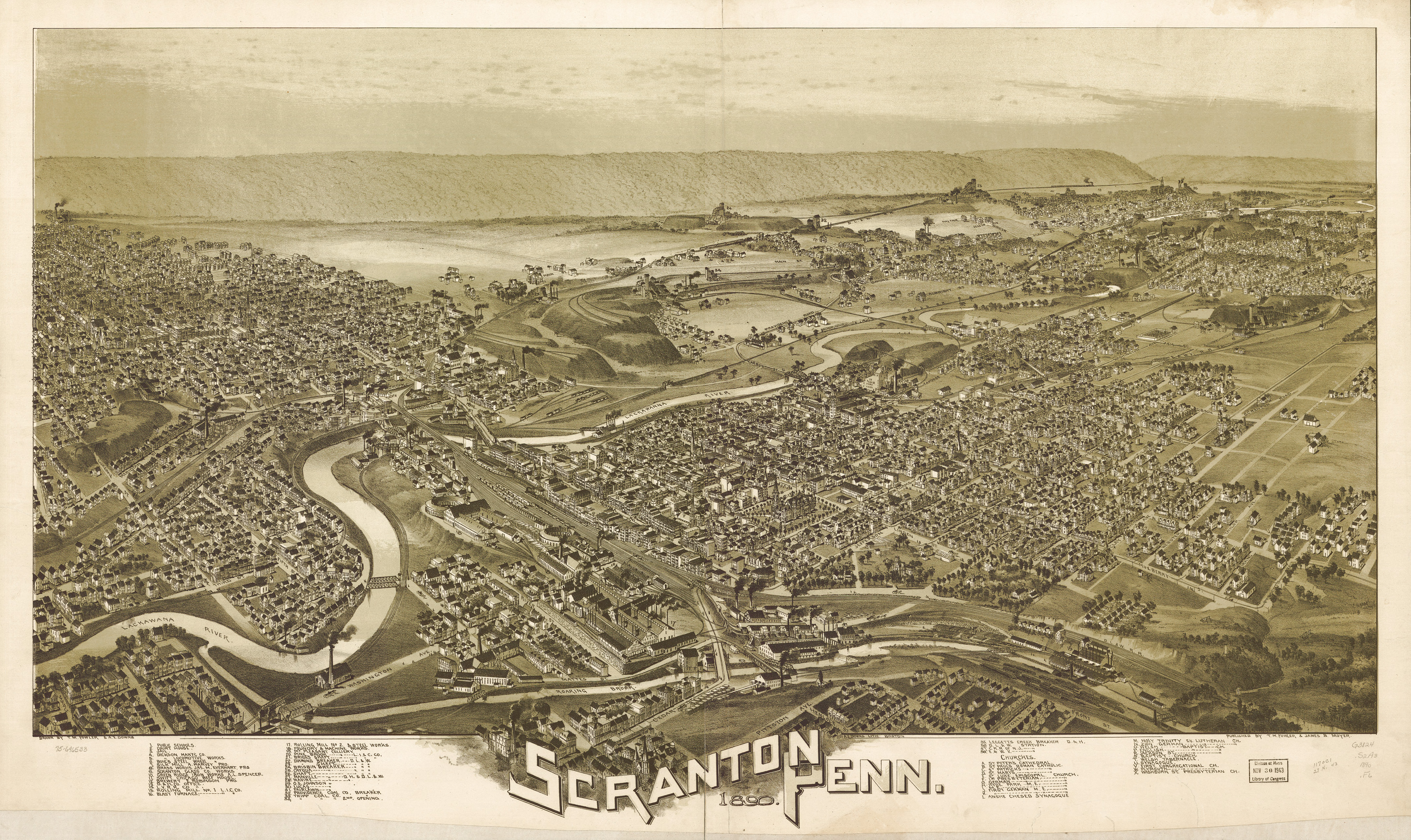
An 1890 panoramic map of Scranton

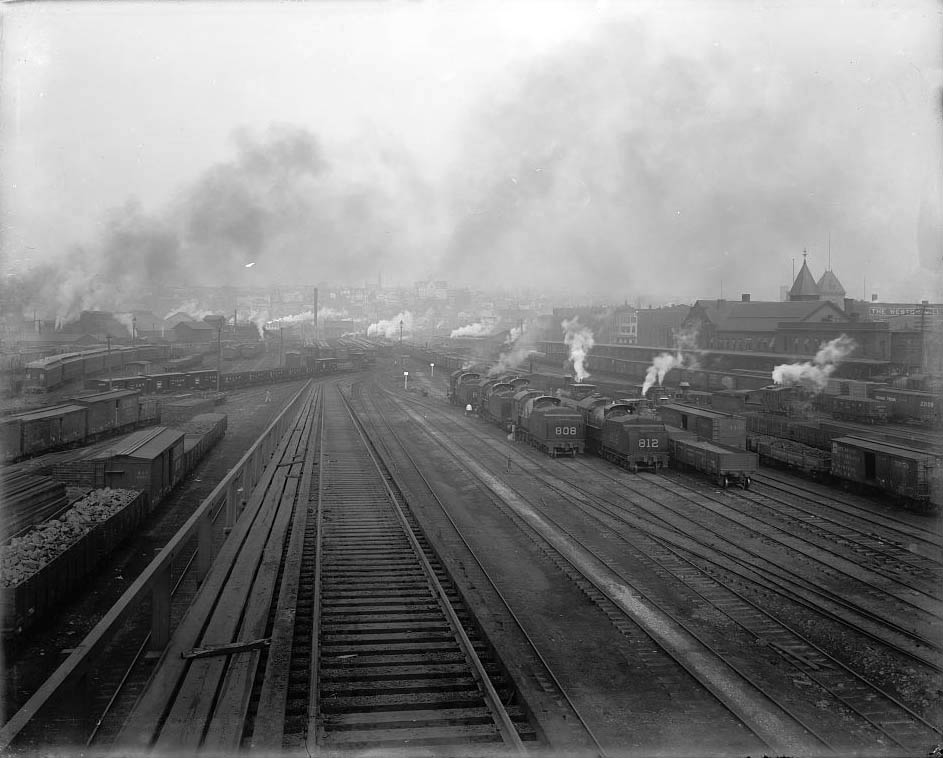
Delaware, Lackawanna and Western Railroad yards in Scranton, c. 1895

Though anthracite coal was being mined in Carbondale to the north and Wilkes-Barre to the south, the industries that precipitated the city's early rapid growth were iron and steel. In the 1840s, brothers Selden T. and George W. Scranton, who had worked at Oxford Furnace in Oxford, New Jersey, founded what became Lackawanna Iron & Coal, later developing as the Lackawanna Steel Company. It initially started producing iron nails, but that venture failed due to low-quality iron. The Erie Railroad's construction in New York State was delayed by its having to acquire iron rails as imports from England. The Scrantons' firm decided to switch its focus to producing T-rails for the Erie; the company soon became a major producer of rails for the rapidly expanding railroads.

In 1851, the Scrantons built the Lackawanna and Western Railroad (L&W) northward, with recent Irish immigrants supplying most of the labor, to meet the Erie Railroad in Great Bend, Pennsylvania. Thus they could transport manufactured rails from the Lackawanna Valley to New York and the Midwest. They also invested in coal mining operations in the city to fuel their steel operations, and to market it to businesses. In 1856, they expanded the railroad eastward as the Delaware, Lackawanna and Western Railroad (DL&W), to tap into the New York City metropolitan market. This railroad, with its hub in Scranton, was Scranton's largest employer for almost one hundred years.

The Pennsylvania Coal Company built a gravity railroad in the 1850s through the city for the purpose of transporting coal. The gravity railroad was replaced by a steam railroad built in 1886 by the Erie and Wyoming Valley Railroad (later absorbed by the Erie Railroad). The Delaware and Hudson (D&H) Canal Company, which had its own gravity railroad from Carbondale to Honesdale, built a steam railroad that entered Scranton in 1863.

During this short period of time, the city rapidly transformed from a small, agrarian-based village of people with New England roots to a multicultural, industrial-based city. From 1860 to 1900, the city's population increased more than tenfold. Most new immigrants, such as the Irish, Italians, and south Germans and Polish, were Catholic, a contrast to the majority-Protestant early settlers of colonial descent. National, ethnic, religious and class differences were wrapped into political affiliations, with many new immigrants joining the Democratic Party, and, for a time in the late 1870s, the Greenbacker-Labor Party.

In 1856, the borough of Scranton was officially incorporated. It was incorporated as a city of 35,000 in 1866 in Luzerne County, when the surrounding boroughs of Hyde Park (now part of the city's West Side) and Providence (now part of North Scranton) were merged with Scranton. Twelve years later in 1878, the state passed a law enabling creation of new counties where a county's population surpassed 150,000, as did Luzerne's. The law appeared to enable the creation of Lackawanna County, and there was considerable political agitation around the authorizing process. Scranton was designated by the state legislature as the county seat of the newly formed county, which was also established as a separate judicial district, with state judges moving over from Luzerne County after courts were organized in October 1878. This was the last county in the state to be organized.

Creation of the new county, which enabled both more local control and political patronage, helped begin the Scranton General Strike of 1877. This was in part due to the larger Great Railroad Strike, in which railroad workers began to organize and participate in walkouts after wage cuts in Martinsburg, West Virginia. The national economy had lagged since the Panic of 1873, and workers in many industries struggled with low wages and intermittent work. In Scranton, mineworkers followed the railroad men off the job, as did others. A protest of 5,000 strikers ended in violence, with a total of four men killed, and 20 to 50 injured, including the mayor. He had established a militia, but called for help from the governor and state militia. Governor John Hartranft eventually brought in federal troops to quell the strike. The workers gained nothing in wages, but began to organize more purposefully into labor unions that could wield more power.

The nation's first successful, continuously operating electrified streetcar (trolley) system was established in the city in 1886, inspiring the nickname "The Electric City". In 1896, the city's various streetcar companies were consolidated into the Scranton Railway Company, which ran trolleys until 1954. By 1890, three other railroads had built lines to tap into the rich supply of coal in and around the city, including the Erie Railroad, the Central Railroad of New Jersey and finally the New York, Ontario and Western Railway (NYO&W).

As the vast rail network spread above ground, an even larger network of railways served the rapidly expanding system of coal veins underground. Miners, who in the early years were typically Welsh and Irish, were hired as cheaply as possible by the coal barons. The workers endured low pay, long hours and unsafe working conditions. Children as young as eight or nine worked 14-hour days separating slate from coal in the breakers. Often, the workers were forced to use company-provided housing and purchase food and other goods from stores owned by the coal companies. With hundreds of thousands of immigrants arriving in the industrial cities, mine owners did not have to search for labor and workers struggled to keep their positions. Later miners came from Italy and eastern Europe, which people fled because of poverty and lack of jobs.

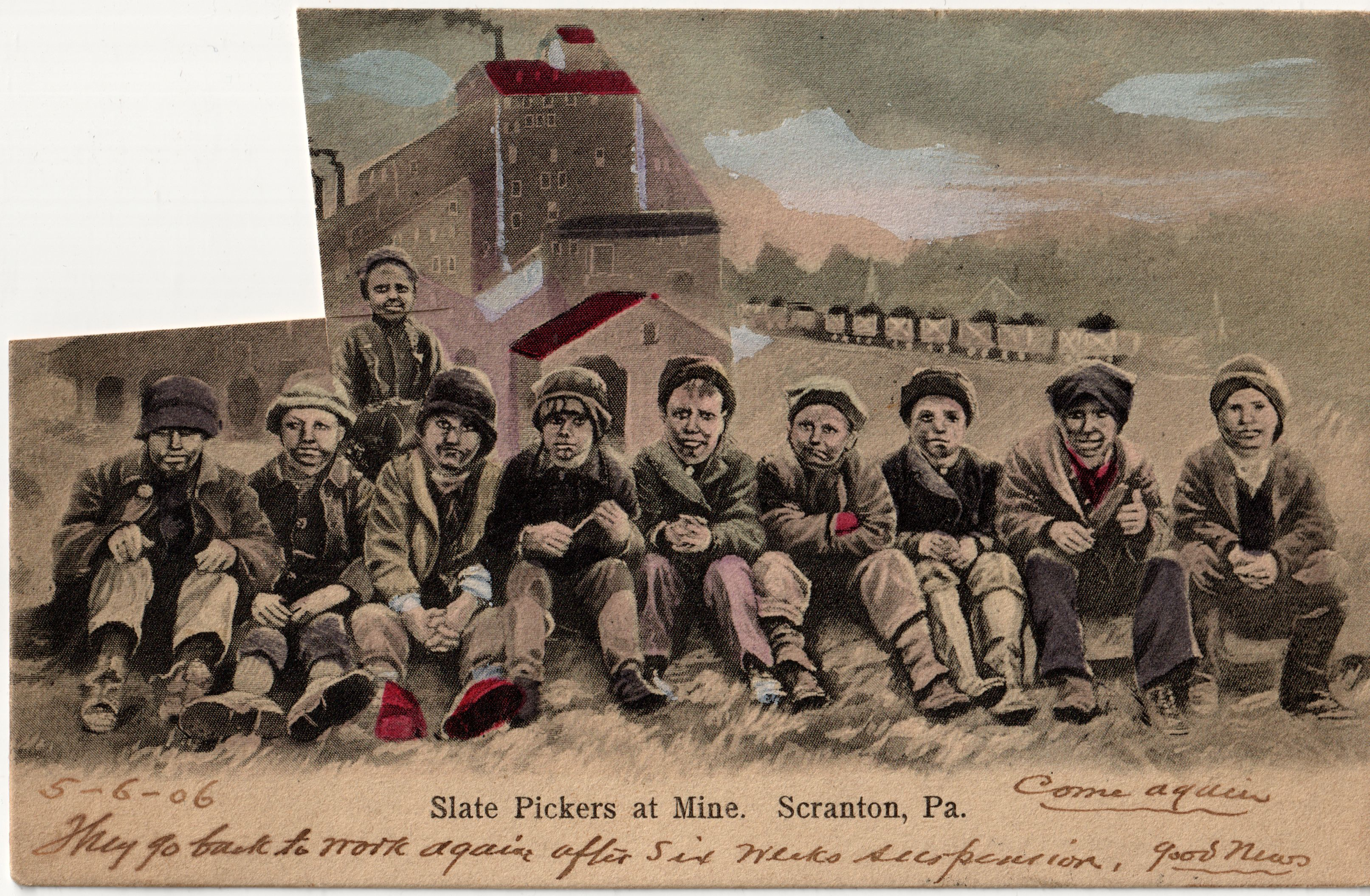
Child slate pickers at a mine in Scanton, Pennsylvania, 1906

Business was booming at the end of the 19th century. The tonnage of coal mined increased virtually every year, as did the steel manufactured by the Lackawanna Steel Company. At one point the company had the largest steel plant in the United States, and it was still the second largest producer at the turn of the 20th century. By 1900, the city had a population of more than 100,000.

Scranton has had a notable labor history; various coal worker unions struggled throughout the coal-mining era to improve working conditions, raise wages, and guarantee fair treatment for workers. The Panic of 1873 and other economic difficulties caused a national recession and loss of business. As the economy contracted, the railroad companies reduced wages of workers in most classes (while sometimes reserving raises for their top management). A major strike of railroad workers in August 1877, part of the Great Railroad Strike, attracted workers from the steel industry and mining as well, and developed as the Scranton General Strike. Four rioters were killed during unrest during the strike, after the mayor mustered a militia. With violence suppressed by militia and federal troops, workers finally returned to their jobs, not able to gain any economic relief. William Walker Scranton, from the prominent family, was then general manager of Lackawanna Iron and Coal. He later founded Scranton Steel Company.

The labor issues and growth of industry in Scranton contributed to Lackawanna County being established by the state legislature in 1878, with territory taken from Luzerne County. Scranton was designated as the county seat. This strengthened its local government.

The unions failed to gain higher wages that year, but in 1878 they elected labor leader Terence V. Powderly of the Knights of Labor as mayor of Scranton. After that, he became national leader of the KoL, a predominately Catholic organization that had a peak membership of 700,000 circa 1880. While the Catholic Church had prohibited membership in secret organizations since the mid-18th century, by the late 1880s with the influence of Archbishop James Gibbons of Baltimore, Maryland, it supported the Knights of Labor as representing workingmen and union organizing.

=== 20th century ===
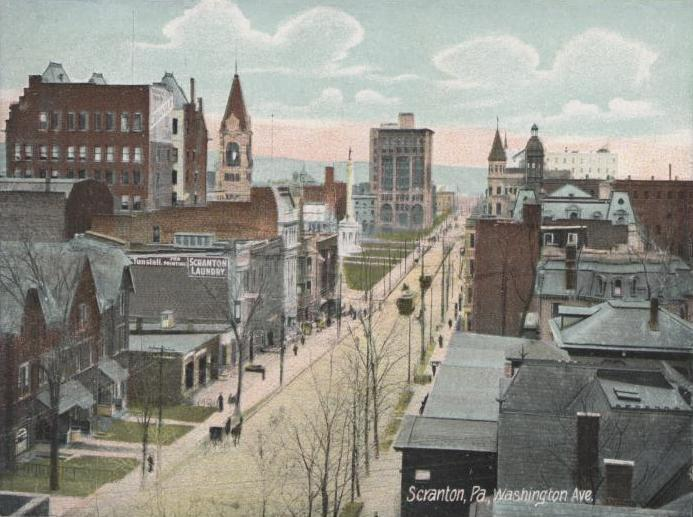
A 1907 illustration of Washington Avenue

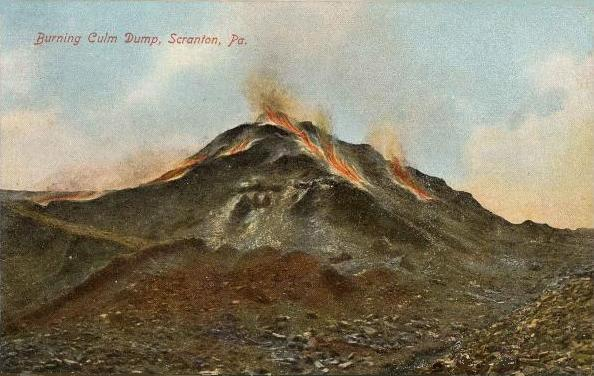
Burning culm dump, c. 1908

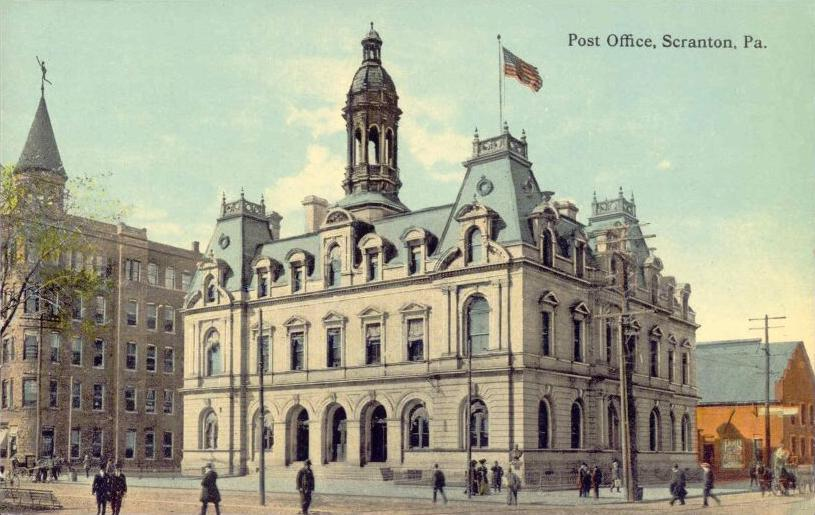
Scranton's old post office in 1911

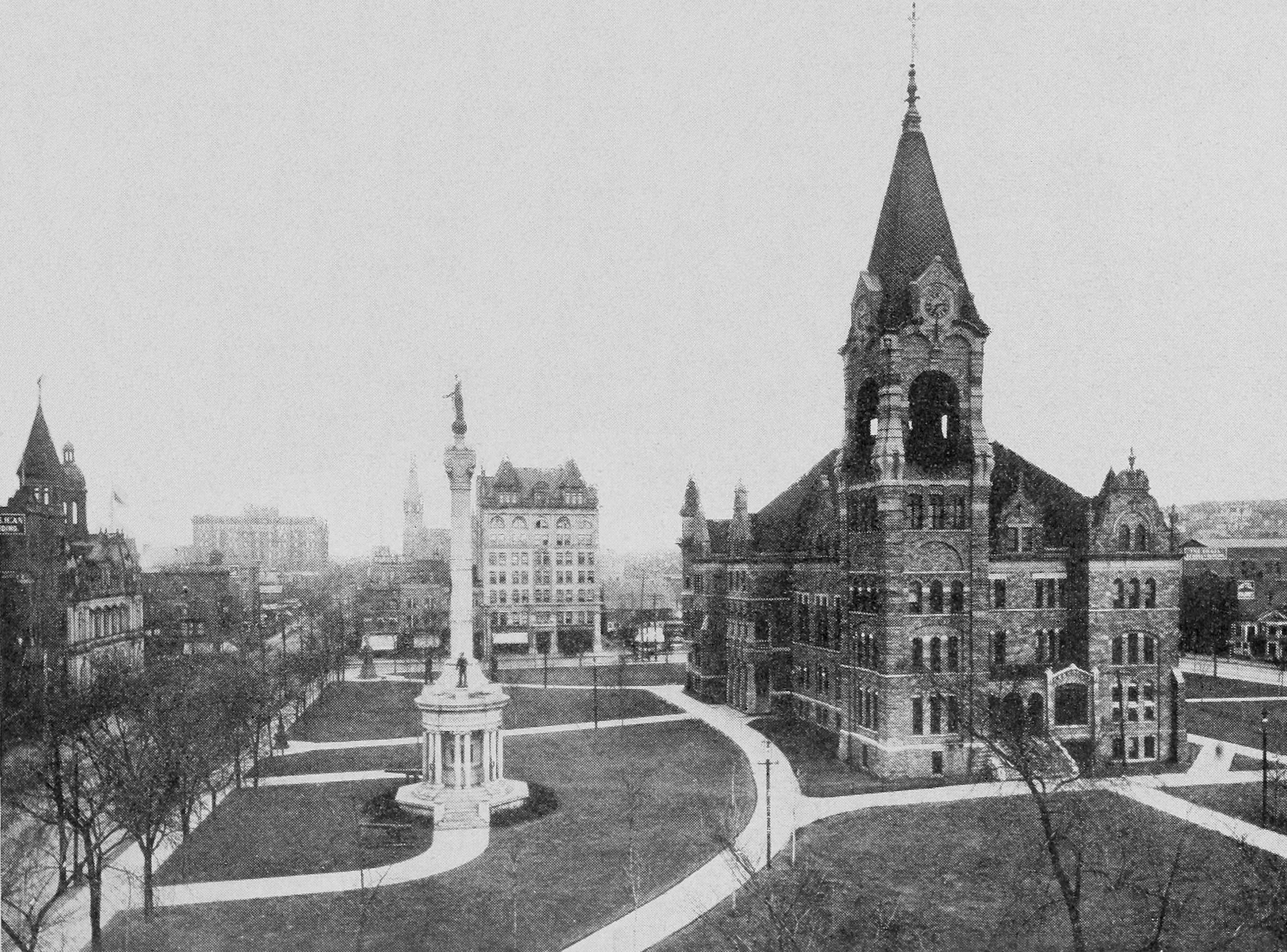
County Courthouse and Soldiers Monument, c. 1919

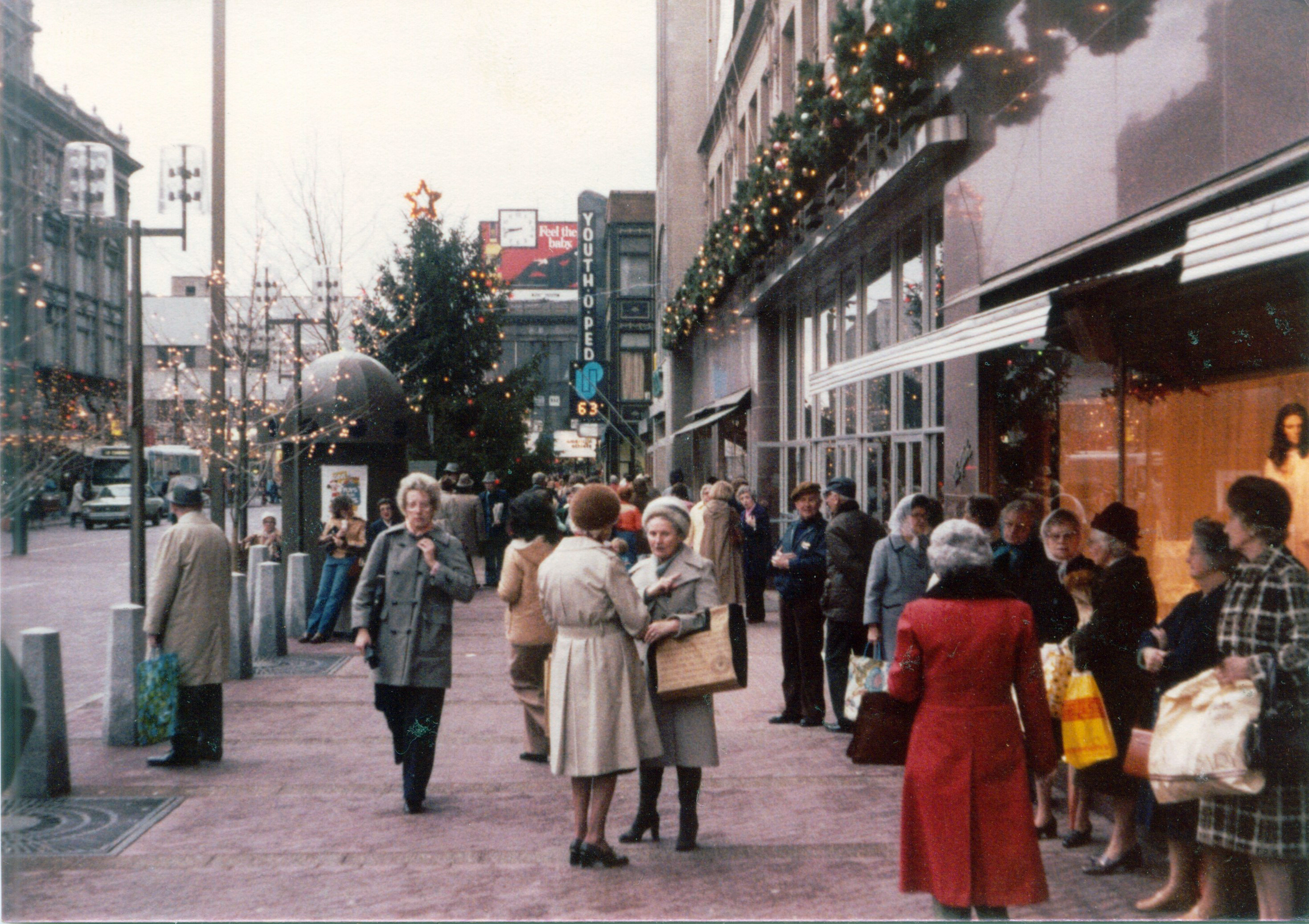
The Globe Store near Wyoming and Lackawanna Avenues in 1978

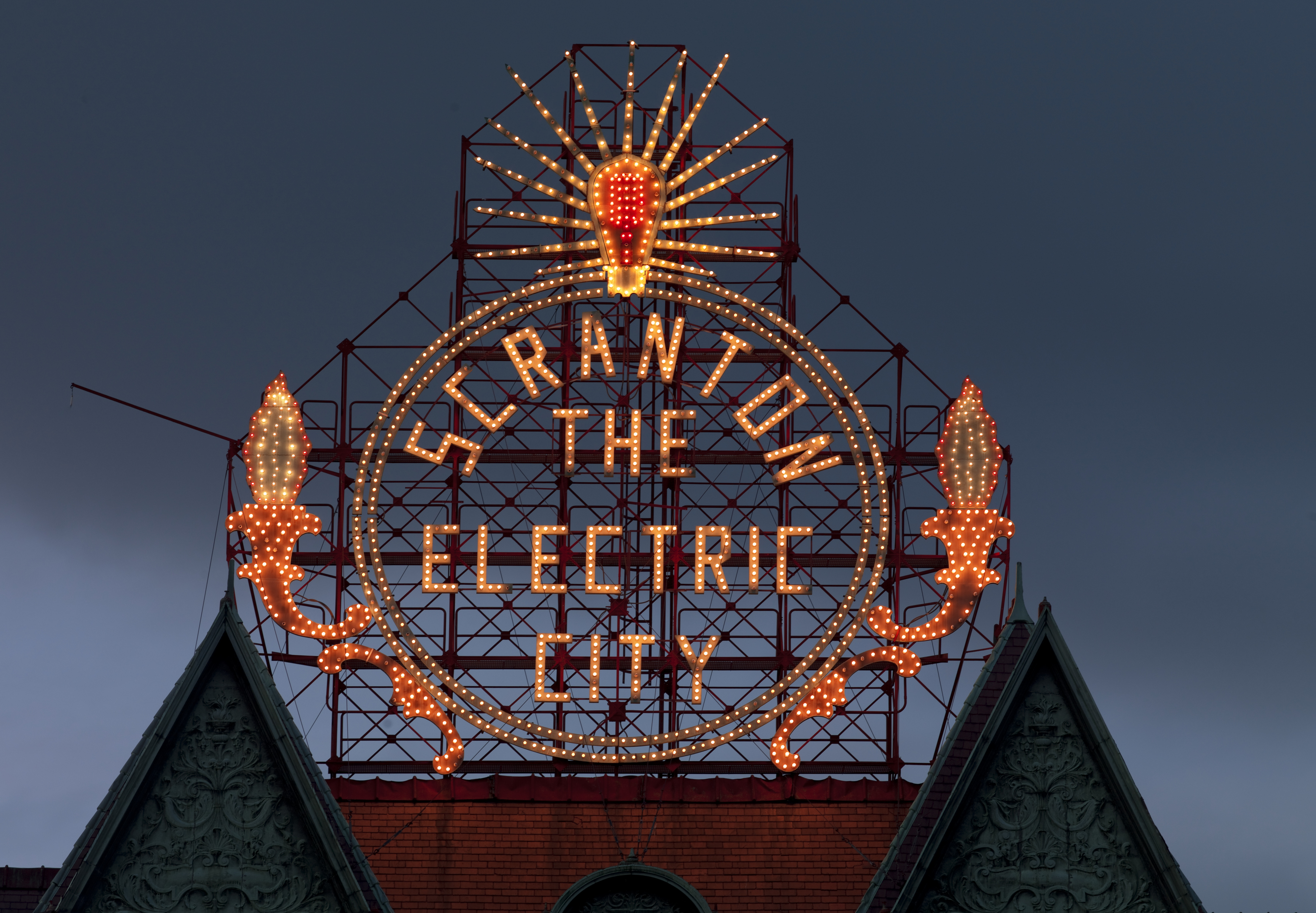
The Historic Electric City sign, restored in 2008

The landmark Coal strike of 1902 was called by anthracite miners across the region and led by the United Mine Workers under John Mitchell. The strike was settled by a compromise brokered by President Theodore Roosevelt. A statue of John Mitchell was installed in his honor on the grounds of the Lackawanna County Courthouse in Scranton, "the site of the Coal Strike of 1902 negotiations in which President Roosevelt participated. Because of the significance of these negotiations, the statue and the Courthouse were added to the National Register of Historic Places in 1997. John Mitchell is buried in Cathedral Cemetery in Scranton."

At the 1900 United States census, the population of Scranton was about 102,026, making it the third-largest city in Pennsylvania and 38th-largest U.S. city at the time. At the turn of the 20th century, wealthy businessmen and industrialists built impressive Victorian mansions in the Hill and Green Ridge sections of the city. The industrial workers, who tended to be later immigrants from Ireland and southern and eastern Europe, were predominately Catholic. With a flood of immigrants in the market, they suffered poor working conditions and wages.

In 1902, the dwindling local iron ore supply, labor issues, and an aging plant cost the city the industry on which it was founded. The Lackawanna Steel Company and many of its workers were moved to Lackawanna, New York, developed on Lake Erie just south of Buffalo. With a port on the lake, the company could receive iron ore shipped from the Mesabi Range in Minnesota, which was being newly mined.

Scranton forged ahead as the capital of the anthracite coal industry. Attracting the thousands of workers needed to mine coal, the city developed new neighborhoods dominated by Italian and Eastern European immigrants, who brought their foods, cultures and religions. Many of the immigrants joined the Democratic Party. Their national churches and neighborhoods were part of the history of the city. Several Catholic and Orthodox churches were founded and built during this period. A substantial Jewish community was also established, with most members coming from the Russian Empire and eastern Europe. Working conditions for miners were improved by the efforts of labor leaders such as John Mitchell, who led the United Mine Workers.

The sub-surface mining weakened whole neighborhoods, however, damaging homes, schools, and businesses when the land collapsed. In 1913 the state passed the Davis Act to establish the Bureau of Surface Support in Scranton. Because of the difficulty in dealing with the coal companies, citizens organized the Scranton Surface Protection Association, chartered by the Court of Common Pleas on November 24, 1913 "to protect the lives and property of the citizens of the City of Scranton and the streets of said city from injury, loss and damage caused by mining and mine caves."

In 1915 and 1917, the city and Commonwealth sought injunctions to prevent coal companies from undermining city streets but lost their cases. North Main Avenue and Boulevard Avenue, "both entitled to surface support, caved in as a result" of court decisions that went against civil authorities and allowed the coal companies to continue their operations.

"The case of Penman v. Jones came out differently. The Lackawanna Iron & Coal Co. had leased coal lands to the Lackawanna Iron & Steel Co., an allied interest, which passed the leases on to the Scranton Coal Co. Areas of central Scranton, the Hill Section, South Side, Pine Brook, Green Ridge and Hyde Park were affected by their mining activities. Mr. Penman was the private property owner in the case. The coal operators were defeated in this case."

The public transportation system began to expand beyond the trolley lines pioneered by predecessors of the Scranton Railways system. The Lackawanna and Wyoming Valley Railroad, commonly referred to as the Laurel Line, was built as an interurban passenger and freight carrier to Wilkes-Barre. Its Scranton station, offices, powerhouse and maintenance facility were built on the former grounds of the Lackawanna Steel Company, and operations started in 1903. Beginning in 1907, Scrantonians could also ride trolley cars to the northern suburbs of Clarks Summit and Dalton. They could travel to Lake Winola and Montrose using the Northern Electric Railroad. After the 1920s, no new trolley lines were built, but bus operations were started and expanded to meet service needs. In 1934, Scranton Railways was re-incorporated as the Scranton Transit Company, reflecting that shift in transportation modes.

Starting in the early 1920s, the Scranton Button Company (founded in 1885 and a major maker of shellac buttons) became one of the primary makers of phonograph records. They pressed records for Emerson (whom they bought in 1924), as well as Regal, Cameo, Romeo, Banner, Domino, Conqueror. In July 1929, the company merged with Regal, Cameo, Banner, and the U.S. branch of Pathé (makers of Pathé and Perfect) to become the American Record Corporation. By 1938, the Scranton company was also pressing records for Brunswick, Melotone, and Vocalion. In 1946, the company was acquired by Capitol Records, which continued to produce phonograph records through the end of the vinyl era.

By the mid-1930s, the city population had swelled beyond 140,000 due to growth in the mining and silk textile industries. World War II created a great demand for energy, which led to the highest production from mining in the area since World War I.

After World War II, coal lost favor to oil and natural gas as a heating fuel, largely because the latter types were more convenient to use. While some U.S. cities prospered in the post-war boom, the fortunes and population of Scranton (and the rest of Lackawanna and Luzerne counties) began to diminish. Coal production and rail traffic declined rapidly throughout the 1950s, causing a loss of jobs.

In 1954, Worthington Scranton and his wife, Marion Margery Scranton, contributed one million dollars to establish the Scranton Foundation (now the Scranton Area Community Foundation), which was launched to support charitable and educational organizations in the city of Scranton.

The Knox Mine Disaster of January 1959 virtually ended the mining industry in Northeastern Pennsylvania. The waters of the Susquehanna River flooded the mines. The DL&W Railroad, nearly bankrupted by the drop in coal traffic and the effects of Hurricane Diane, merged in 1960 with the Erie Railroad. Demand for public transportation also declined as new highways were built by federal subsidies and people purchased automobiles. In 1952, the Laurel Line ceased passenger service. The Scranton Transit Company, whose trolleys had given the city its nickname, transferred all operations to buses as the 1954 holiday season approached; by the end of 1971, it ceased all operations. The city was left without any public transportation system for almost a year until the Lackawanna County government formed COLTS, which began operations in late 1972 with 1950s-era GM busses from New Jersey.

Scranton had been the hub of its operations until the Erie Lackawanna merger, after which it no longer served in this capacity. This was another severe blow to the local labor market. The NYO&W Railroad, which depended heavily on its Scranton branch for freight traffic, was abandoned in 1957. Mine subsidence was a spreading problem in the city as pillar supports in abandoned mines began to fail; cave-ins sometimes consumed entire blocks of homes. The area was left scarred by abandoned coal mining structures, strip mines, and massive culm dumps, some of which caught fire and burned for many years until they were extinguished through government efforts. In 1970, the Secretary of Mines for Pennsylvania suggested that so many underground voids had been left by mining underneath Scranton that it would be "more economical" to abandon the city than make them safe. In 1973, the last mine operations in Lackawanna County (which were in what is now McDade Park, and another on the Scranton/Dickson City line) were closed. During the 1960s and 1970s, the silk and other textile industries shrank as jobs were moved to the South or overseas.

In 1962, businessman Alex Grass opened his first "Thrif D Discount Center" drugstore on Lackawanna Avenue in downtown Scranton. The 17-by-75-foot (5 by 23 m) store, an immediate success, was the progenitor of the Rite Aid national drugstore chain.

During the 1970s and 1980s, many downtown storefronts and theaters became vacant. Suburban development followed the highways and suburban shopping malls became the dominant venues for shopping and entertainment.

External audio
- Scranton, A City That's Seen Many Come and Go, 24:01, Grapple, Keystone Crossroads

Since the mid-1980s, the city has emphasized revitalization. Local government and much of the community at large have adopted a renewed interest in the city's buildings and history. Some historic properties have been renovated and marketed as tourist attractions. The Steamtown National Historic Site captures the area's once-prominent position in the railroad industry. The former DL&W train station was restored as the Radisson Lackawanna Station Hotel. The Electric City Trolley Museum was created next to the DL&W yards that the Steamtown NHS occupies.

Since the mid-1980s the Scranton Cultural Center has operated the architecturally significant Masonic Temple and Scottish Rite Cathedral, designed by Raymond Hood, as the region's performing arts center. The Houdini Museum was opened in Scranton in 1990 by nationally known magician Dorothy Dietrich.

=== 21st century ===
According to The Guardian, the city was close to bankruptcy in July 2012, with the wages of all municipal officials, including the mayor and fire chief, being cut to $7.25/hour. Financial consultant Gary Lewis, who lived in Scranton, was quoted as estimating that "on 5 July the city had just $5,000 cash in hand."

Since the revitalization began, many coffee shops, restaurants, and bars have opened in the downtown. The low cost of living, pedestrian-friendly downtown, and the construction of loft-style apartments in older, architecturally significant buildings have attracted young professionals and artists. Many are individuals who grew up in Scranton, moved to big cities after high school and college, and decided to return to the area. Many buildings around the city that were once empty are currently being restored. Some of the newly renovated buildings are already being used.

Attractions include the Montage Mountain Ski Resort, the Wilkes-Barre/Scranton Penguins, AHL affiliate of the Pittsburgh Penguins; the Scranton/Wilkes-Barre Highlanders, AAA affiliate of the New York Yankees, PNC Field, and the Toyota Pavilion at Montage Mountain concert venue.

On September 22, 2024, Ukrainian President Volodymyr Zelenskyy visited the Scranton Army Ammunition Plant, which produces 155mm artillery shells that Ukraine's military uses.

== Geography ==
Scranton's total area of 25.4 square miles (66 km^{2}) includes 25.2 square miles (65 km^{2}) of land and 0.2 square miles (0.52 km^{2}) of water, according to the United States Census Bureau. Scranton is drained by the Lackawanna River.

Center City is about 750 feet (229 m) above sea level, although the hilly city's inhabited portions range about from 650 to 1,400 feet (200 to 430 m). The city is flanked by mountains to the east and west whose elevations range from 1,900 to 2,100 feet (580 to 640 m).

=== Climate ===
Scranton has a humid continental climate (Köppen Dfa), with four distinct seasons. Summers have occasional heat waves bringing temperatures well above 90 °F (32 °C), while winters can have cold snaps bringing temperatures below 0 °F (−18 °C). The monthly daily average temperature in January, the coldest month, is 28.0 °F (−2.2 °C), while the same figure in July, the warmest month, is 73.7 °F (23.2 °C). Extremes in temperatures have ranged from 101 °F (38 °C) down to −21 °F (−29 °C) on January 21, 1994; there is an average of 15 days of 90 °F (32 °C)+ highs, 39 days where the high fails to rise above freezing, and 3 days where the minimum is at or below 0 °F (−18 °C). Precipitation is generally slightly greater during late spring and summer, while winter is generally the driest. On average, each month sees 10 to 13 days of precipitation, and the mean annual total is 38.72 inches (983 mm). Snowfall is variable, with some winters bringing light snow and others bringing numerous snowstorms. For the 1991–2020 period, snowfall has averaged 45.1 inches (115 cm) per year, with January accounting for most of the seasonal total; on average, the first and last dates of measurable (≥0.1 in or 0.25 cm) snowfall are November 14 and March 31, respectively, with snow in October and April a rare occurrence.

The hardiness zone is mostly 6b with 7a from downtown downriver and 6a up on Montage Mountain. 2023 USDA Plant Hardiness Zone Map | USDA Plant Hardiness Zone Map

Climate data for Wilkes-Barre/Scranton International Airport, Pennsylvania (1991–2020 normals, (Note: Mean monthly maxima and minima (i.e. the expected highest and lowest temperature readings at any point during the year or given month) calculated based on data at said location from 1991 to 2010.) extremes 1901–present (Note: Official records for Avoca/Wilkes-Barre–Scranton kept at downtown Scranton from January 1901 to 17 April 1955 and at Wilkes-Barre/Scranton International Airport since 18 April 1955.))
Month	Jan	Feb	Mar	Apr	May	Jun	Jul	Aug	Sep	Oct	Nov	Dec	Year
Record high °F (°C)	69 (21)	76 (24)	85 (29)	93 (34)	93 (34)	99 (37)	103 (39)	102 (39)	100 (38)	91 (33)	81 (27)	71 (22)	103 (39)
Mean maximum °F (°C)	57.7 (14.3)	57.0 (13.9)	68.0 (20.0)	81.3 (27.4)	88.0 (31.1)	90.5 (32.5)	92.8 (33.8)	90.5 (32.5)	87.6 (30.9)	78.6 (25.9)	69.1 (20.6)	59.6 (15.3)	94.3 (34.6)
Mean daily maximum °F (°C)	35.7 (2.1)	38.8 (3.8)	47.6 (8.7)	61.1 (16.2)	72.2 (22.3)	79.9 (26.6)	84.6 (29.2)	82.4 (28.0)	75.1 (23.9)	63.1 (17.3)	51.2 (10.7)	40.3 (4.6)	61.0 (16.1)
Daily mean °F (°C)	28.0 (−2.2)	30.3 (−0.9)	38.3 (3.5)	50.2 (10.1)	60.9 (16.1)	69.0 (20.6)	73.7 (23.2)	71.8 (22.1)	64.6 (18.1)	53.2 (11.8)	42.7 (5.9)	33.3 (0.7)	51.3 (10.7)
Mean daily minimum °F (°C)	20.3 (−6.5)	21.9 (−5.6)	28.9 (−1.7)	39.3 (4.1)	49.6 (9.8)	58.1 (14.5)	62.7 (17.1)	61.1 (16.2)	54.0 (12.2)	43.3 (6.3)	34.3 (1.3)	26.3 (−3.2)	41.7 (5.4)
Mean minimum °F (°C)	0.6 (−17.4)	3.6 (−15.8)	11.0 (−11.7)	24.7 (−4.1)	34.7 (1.5)	44.1 (6.7)	50.9 (10.5)	48.8 (9.3)	38.7 (3.7)	28.7 (−1.8)	18.0 (−7.8)	9.1 (−12.7)	−1.6 (−18.7)
Record low °F (°C)	−21 (−29)	−19 (−28)	−4 (−20)	8 (−13)	27 (−3)	34 (1)	43 (6)	38 (3)	29 (−2)	19 (−7)	5 (−15)	−13 (−25)	−21 (−29)
Average precipitation inches (mm)	2.59 (66)	2.07 (53)	2.77 (70)	3.26 (83)	3.26 (83)	3.80 (97)	3.61 (92)	3.85 (98)	4.15 (105)	3.71 (94)	2.85 (72)	2.80 (71)	38.72 (983)
Average snowfall inches (cm)	11.7 (30)	10.9 (28)	10.1 (26)	0.8 (2.0)	0.0 (0.0)	0.0 (0.0)	0.0 (0.0)	0.0 (0.0)	0.0 (0.0)	0.7 (1.8)	3.2 (8.1)	7.7 (20)	45.1 (115)
Average precipitation days (≥ 0.01 in)	12.6	11.4	11.8	12.2	12.9	12.9	11.1	11.1	10.0	10.7	10.3	12.1	139.1
Average snowy days (≥ 0.1 in)	8.7	8.4	4.8	1.0	0.0	0.0	0.0	0.0	0.0	0.3	1.7	6.3	31.2
Average relative humidity (%)	70.1	67.5	63.3	60.4	64.6	70.5	71.1	73.8	75.2	71.6	71.8	72.5	69.4
Average dew point °F (°C)	16.2 (−8.8)	17.2 (−8.2)	24.4 (−4.2)	33.1 (0.6)	45.3 (7.4)	55.9 (13.3)	60.4 (15.8)	59.9 (15.5)	53.4 (11.9)	41.4 (5.2)	32.2 (0.1)	22.3 (−5.4)	38.5 (3.6)
Mean monthly sunshine hours	130.3	143.7	185.7	210.5	246.9	269.7	285.7	257.2	200.2	173.3	104.3	95.9	2,303.4
Percentage possible sunshine	44	48	50	53	55	60	62	60	54	50	35	33	52
Source: NOAA (relative humidity and dew point 1964–1990, sun 1961–1990)

== Demographics ==
Historical population
Census	Pop.	Note	%±
1850	2,730		—
1860	9,223		237.8%
1870	35,092		280.5%
1880	45,850		30.7%
1890	75,215		64.0%
1900	102,026		35.6%
1910	129,867		27.3%
1920	137,783		6.1%
1930	143,433		4.1%
1940	140,404		−2.1%
1950	125,536		−10.6%
1960	111,443		−11.2%
1970	103,564		−7.1%
1980	88,117		−14.9%
1990	81,805		−7.2%
2000	76,415		−6.6%
2010	76,089		−0.4%
2020	76,328		0.3%
2025 (est.)	75,514		−1.1%
U.S. Decennial Census; 2018 Estimate 2020

=== 2020 census ===
As of the 2020 census, Scranton had a population of 76,328 and a median age of 38.3 years. 20.2% of residents were under the age of 18 and 18.3% of residents were 65 years of age or older. For every 100 females there were 95.5 males, and for every 100 females age 18 and over there were 93.4 males age 18 and over.

98.9% of residents lived in urban areas, while 1.1% lived in rural areas.

There were 30,174 households in Scranton, of which 25.9% had children under the age of 18 living in them. Of all households, 33.0% were married-couple households, 24.4% were households with a male householder and no spouse or partner present, and 34.7% were households with a female householder and no spouse or partner present. About 37.3% of all households were made up of individuals and 15.6% had someone living alone who was 65 years of age or older.

There were 34,723 housing units, of which 13.1% were vacant. The homeowner vacancy rate was 2.6% and the rental vacancy rate was 8.9%.

Racial composition as of the 2020 census
Race	Number	Percent
White	53,074	69.5%
Black or African American	6,178	8.1%
American Indian and Alaska Native	378	0.5%
Asian	4,272	5.6%
Native Hawaiian and Other Pacific Islander	27	0.0%
Some other race	6,063	7.9%
Two or more races	6,336	8.3%
Hispanic or Latino (of any race)	12,210	16.0%

=== 2010 census ===
As of the 2010 census, there were 76,089 people, 30,069 households, and 18,124 families residing in the city. The population density was 3,006/mi^{2} (1,161/km^{2}). There were 33,853 housing units at an average density of 1,342/mi^{2} (518/km^{2}). The racial makeup of the city was 84.11% White, 5.45% African American, 0.23% Native American, 2.98% Asian, 0.04% Pacific Islander, 4.69% from other races, and 2.49% from two or more races. Hispanic or Latino of any race make up 9.90% of the population. The largest ancestry in the city is Irish, making up 26.5% of the population.

There were 30,069 households, out of which 24.4% had children under the age of 18 living with them, 39.8% were married couples living together, 13.8% had a female householder with no husband present, and 42.1% were non-families. The city had 36.7% of its households with single occupancy and 18.1% whose individuals was aged at least 65. The average household size was 2.29 and the average family size was 3.01.

The age distribution of the population included 20.8% under 18, 12.3% from 18 to 24, 25.5% from 25 to 44, 21.2% from 45 to 64, and 20.1% at least 65. The median age was 39. For every 100 females, there were 87.0 males. For every 100 females aged at least 18, there were 83.0 males.

The median income for a household in the city was $28,805, and the median income for a family was $41,642. Males had a median income of $30,829 versus $21,858 for females. The per capita income for the city was $16,174. Found below the poverty line are 15.0% of the population, 10.7% of families, 18.9% of those under age 18 and 12.0% of those at least age 65.

=== 2006 American Community Survey ===
As of the 2006 American Community Survey, the average family size is 2.95. Of the population that's 25 years old and over, 83.3% of them have graduated from high school. 18.7% of them have a Bachelor's degree or higher. In labor force (population 16 years and over), 57.6% of them work. The per capita income (in 2006 inflation-adjusted dollars) is $17,187.

=== Dialect ===
The local accent of American English in Scranton is Northeast Pennsylvania English.

== Arts and culture ==
=== Landmarks and attractions ===
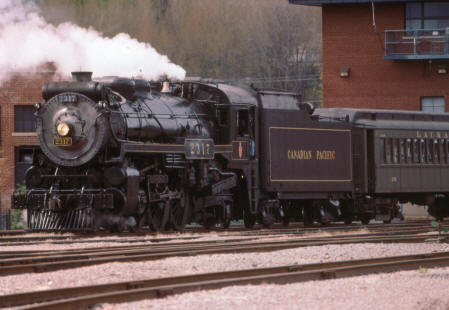
Steamtown National Historic Site showcases steam-era railroading, and excursion trains give visitors tours through Scranton and portions of the Pocono Mountains.

Many of Scranton's attractions celebrate its heritage as an industrial center in iron and coal production and its ethnic diversity. The Scranton Iron Furnaces are remnants of the city's founding industry and of the Scranton family's Lackawanna Steel Company. The Steamtown National Historic Site seeks to preserve the history of railroads in the Northeast. The Electric City Trolley Museum preserves and operates pieces of Pennsylvania streetcar history. Tourists may go for trolley rides from Downtown Scranton to PNC Field on Montage Mountain. The Lackawanna Coal Mine tour at McDade Park, conducted inside a former mine, describes the history of mining and railroads in the Scranton area. The former DL&W Passenger Station is now the Radisson Lackawanna Station Hotel.

Museums in Scranton include the Everhart Museum in Nay Aug Park, which houses a collection of natural history, science and art exhibits; and the Houdini Museum, which features films, exhibits, and a stage show in a unique, century-old building. Terence Powderly's house, still a private dwelling, is one of the city's many historic buildings and, with Steamtown, the city's other National Historic Landmark. In addition, The Lackawanna Historical Society, founded in 1886 and located at the George H. Catlin House in Scranton's Hill Section, focuses on the history of Lackawanna County. Tripp House, built by the Tripp family in 1771, is the oldest building in the city.

The city's religious history is evident in the Basilica of the National Shrine of St. Ann, which draws thousands of pilgrims to its annual novena, and St. Stanislaus Cathedral, the seat of the Polish National Catholic Church in North America. The history of the founding of this denomination is tied to Polish immigration to Scranton in the late 19th century.

Since the 1970s, Scranton has hosted La Festa Italiana, a three-day Italian festival that takes place on Labor Day weekend on the courthouse square. The festival originally took place around Columbus Day, but was moved because Scranton generally receives cold weather in October.

Scranton's large Irish population is represented in the annual Saint Patrick's Day Parade, first held in 1862. Organized by the St. Patrick's Day Parade Association of Lackawanna County, it is the nation's fourth largest in attendance and second largest in per capita attendance. Held on the Saturday before Saint Patrick's Day, the parade includes more than 8,000 people, including floats, bagpipe players, high school bands and Irish groups. In 2008, attendance estimates were as high as 150,000 people.

Scranton was a cultural center for Welsh Americans, and in the late 19th century it was described as Athen Cymru America (the Welsh Athens of America).

For recreation, there is Montage Mountain Ski Resort, known as Sno Mountain for a short period, which rivals the numerous resorts of the Poconos in popularity and offers a relatively comprehensive range of difficulty levels. The 26.2-mile (42.2 km) Steamtown Marathon has been held each October since 1996 and finishes in downtown Scranton. Nay Aug park is the largest of several parks in Scranton and was designed by Frederick Law Olmsted, who also laid out Central Park in Manhattan, New York City. The city is the home to numerous artistic organizations, including the Scranton Fringe Festival (a performing arts festival held in the downtown section of the city in fall).

Scranton's primary concert venue is the Toyota Pavilion at Montage Mountain, a partially covered amphitheater that seats 17,500. Its summer concerts have included James Taylor, Dave Matthews Band, and many other musical acts.

Scranton Cultural Center at the Masonic Temple is an impressive piece of architecture which houses several auditoriums and a large ballroom. It hosts the Northeast Philharmonic, Broadway Theater and other touring performances.

The tallest building in Scranton is the Scranton Times Tower, a lattice radio tower on the Times building, which is illuminated during Christmas season.

=== Libraries ===
The Lackawanna County Library System administers the libraries in Scranton, including the Albright Memorial Library, the Lackawanna County Children's Library and the Nancy Kay Holmes Library. As of 2008, Scranton libraries serve more than 96,000 people and have a circulation of over 547,000.

== Sports ==
Scranton's professional sports date to 1887, when the minor-league Scranton Indians became the city's first professional baseball team. Many more followed, including teams in the Pennsylvania State League, Eastern League, Atlantic League, New York State League, New York–Penn League and the New York–Pennsylvania League. The Scranton/Wilkes-Barre Highlanders(founded as the Red Barons in 1989, later renamed the Yankees and Railriders) of the AAA International League play their home games at PNC Field in Moosic, south of Scranton.

In football, the Scranton Eagles, a discontinued semi-pro/minor league team, dominated their Empire Football League, winning 11 championships. The former arena football Wilkes-Barre/Scranton Pioneers, who played eight seasons at the Mohegan Sun Arena, formerly Wachovia Arena, in Wilkes-Barre Township made the playoffs in their last six years of existence and contended for the ArenaCup VIII in 2007 and the ArenaCup X in 2009, their final year, but lost both times. Another semi-pro/minor league team the North East Pennsylvania Miners of the [Big North East Football Federation started play in the area in 2007. The NEPA Shock are a Semi-Pro/Minor League team that currently operate out of the Dickson City borough. The Shock were established in 2012 and participate in arena style football as a member of the Great Eastern Football Association. The Wilkes-Barre/Scranton Mavericks, an Arena Football One franchise, were scheduled to play in the area, but folded prior to the league's inaugural season.

Scranton previously had pro basketball teams, including the Scranton Apollos, Scranton Miners and Scranton Zappers. Syracuse University men's basketball coach Jim Boeheim played for the Miners before turning to coaching. In 2012, the city played host to the Scranton/Wilkes-Barre Steamers of the Premier Basketball League. The team went inactive after that season, and no professional teams played in the city. In 2018, the Scranton Shamrocks joined the American Basketball Association (2000–present), once again bringing professional basketball to the region.

Professional ice hockey arrived in 1999 when the Wilkes-Barre/Scranton Penguins of the American Hockey League began play at Mohegan Sun Arena at Casey Plaza in Wilkes-Barre Township. The team won conference championships in 2001, 2004, and 2008.

The Electric City Shock SC semi-professional soccer team was founded in 2013 as part of the National Premier Soccer League. The team is on the fourth tier of the American Soccer Pyramid and plays at the University of Scranton's Fitzpatrick Field.

Watres Armory in Scranton hosted a World Heavyweight Championship fight between titlist Larry Holmes and challenger Lucien Rodrigues of France on March 27, 1983. Holmes retained his title via a unanimous 12-round decision without losing a single round in any official scorecard.

== Education ==
=== Primary and secondary education ===
The city's public schools are operated by the Scranton School District (SSD), which serves almost 10,000 students. The city has two public high schools for grades 9–12: Scranton High School just northwest of the downtown and West Scranton High School located on the West Side of the city. The district also has three public middle schools for grades 6–8: Northeast Intermediate, South Scranton Intermediate, and West Scranton Intermediate. In addition, SSD maintains 12 public elementary schools for grades K–5.

Scranton has two private high schools: Scranton Preparatory School, a private Jesuit school, and Yeshiva Bais Moshe, an Ultra Orthodox school. Holy Cross High School in Dunmore is a Catholic high school operated by the Diocese of Scranton that serves students in Scranton and the surrounding area. The diocese also operates several private elementary schools in the city. Protestant schools that serve the Scranton area include Abington Christian Academy, Canaan Christian Academy, Summit Academy, and Triboro Christian Academy. The Pennsylvania Department of Education provides oversight for the Scranton School for Deaf and Hard-of-Hearing Children. The Scranton State School for the Deaf, a state-run school was replaced by the Scranton School for Deaf and Hard-of-Hearing Children.

Penn Foster High School, a distance education high school, is headquartered in Scranton. Merakey Education Center is a small private school located in North Scranton.

Scranton, West Scranton, Scranton Prep and Holy Cross all compete athletically in Pennsylvania's Lackawanna League which is a part of District 2 of the Pennsylvania Interscholastic Athletic Association.

=== Colleges and universities ===
The city hosts five colleges and universities: The University of Scranton, Geisinger Commonwealth School of Medicine, Johnson College, Lackawanna College, Marywood University, and two technical schools, Fortis Institute and The Career Technology Center of Lackawanna County. The Pennsylvania State University operates a Commonwealth Campus, Penn State Scranton, north of the city, in the borough of Dunmore. LCCC, a community college operating out of Nanticoke in Luzerne County, operates a satellite campus at The Marketplace at Steamtown. Penn Foster Career School, a distance education vocational school, is headquartered in Scranton.

== Media ==
The Scranton/Wilkes-Barre area is the 55th largest U.S. television market. Local television stations include:

- WNEP-TV (channel 16), ABC affiliate, owned by Tegna Inc.
- WYOU-TV (channel 22), CBS affiliate, owned by Mission Broadcasting; operated by Nexstar Media Group under shared services agreements
- WBRE-TV (channel 28), NBC affiliate, owned by Nexstar Media Group, licensed to Wilkes-Barre
- WSWB (channel 38), The CW affiliate, owned by MPS Media, LLC; operated by New Age Media, LLC; certain services provided by Sinclair Broadcast Group through master service agreements
- WVIA-TV (channel 44), PBS member station, owned by the Northeast Pennsylvania Educational Television Association
- WQMY (channel 53), MyNetworkTV affiliate, owned by New Age Media, LLC; operated by Sinclair Broadcast Group through master service agreements; licensed to Williamsport
- WOLF-TV (channel 56) Fox affiliate, owned by New Age Media, LLC; operated by Sinclair Broadcast Group through master service agreements; licensed to Hazleton
- WQPX (channel 64), Ion Television owned-and-operated station

Local public-access television and government-access television (ECTV) programming is aired on Comcast cable TV channels 19 and 21.

Scranton hosts the headquarters of Times-Shamrock Communications, which previously published the city's major newspaper, The Times-Tribune, a Pulitzer Prize-winning broadsheet daily founded in 1870, prior to its sale to MediaNews Group in August 2023. Times-Shamrock also published the Electric City, a weekly entertainment tabloid, and The Citizens' Voice, a daily tabloid based in Wilkes-Barre.

Times Leader is a daily paper that primarily covers nearby Wilkes-Barre. The Times Leader also publishes Go Lackawanna, a Sunday newspaper serving Scranton and surrounding municipalities, and the Weekender is a Wilkes-Barre-based entertainment tabloid with distribution in Scranton.

The Aquinas is the weekly student newspaper of the University of Scranton. The Scranton Post is a weekly general interest broadsheet which bills itself as the city's first online newspaper. There are several other print publications with a more narrow focus, including the Union News, La Voz Latina, and Melanian News.

The Scranton/Wilkes-Barre radio market is the 71st-largest in the nation, according to Arbitron rankings in 2009.

== Transportation ==
=== Air ===
The Wilkes-Barre/Scranton International Airport is located in nearby Avoca. The airport is serviced by American Airlines, Regional Sky, and United. The Wilkes-Barre Wyoming Valley Airport is also located in the metropolitan area and serves primarily as a general aviation facility.

=== Highways ===
Scranton is served by several major highways. Interstate 81 runs along the southeastern and northern edges of the city, connecting Scranton with Binghamton, New York, to the north and Wilkes-Barre to the south. The President Biden Expressway (formerly known as the Central Scranton Expressway) provides a freeway connection from downtown Scranton to I-81. Interstate 476, the Northeast Extension of the Pennsylvania Turnpike, runs along the western edge of the city, connecting Scranton with Allentown and Philadelphia to the south and terminating just north of Scranton in Clarks Summit. While not inside the city limits of Scranton, Interstates 84 and 380 terminate with I-81 in nearby Dunmore. I-84 connects the Scranton area to New England, and I-380 connects to a junction with Interstate 80 near Mount Pocono.

U.S. Route 11 enters Scranton from the south, moving through the downtown area and into the northern part of the city as a freeway known as the North Scranton Expressway. U.S. Route 6 moves through the northeastern edge of the city, running as a freeway concurrent with I-81.

Scranton is also served by one state highway, Pennsylvania Route 307, which mostly runs along U.S. Route 11 through the city.

=== Public and private buses ===
Scranton's provider of public transportation is the County of Lackawanna Transit System (COLTS). COLTS buses provide extensive service within the city and more limited service that reaches in all directions to Carbondale, Daleville, Pittston, and Fleetville. The other bussing company is the Luzerne County Transportation Authority (LCTA), which mainly runs through The Minooka section (closest to Luzerne County) and Downtown Scranton by The Marketplace at Steamtown. LCTA takes passengers from Scranton to the Mohegan Pennsylvania racino in Plains.

Martz Trailways and Greyhound Lines provide coach bus transportation from its downtown station to New York City, Philadelphia, and other Northeastern destinations.

Several jitney companies operate from Scranton through Stroudsburg to Paterson and New York City via I-80 as part of the Uptown Vans network

=== Railroads ===
Rail transportation, in both freight and passenger, were vital to the city's historic growth. The city was a hub, serving the Central Railroad of New Jersey (CNJ), the Delaware and Hudson Railway, the Delaware, Lackawanna and Western Railroad (DLW), the Erie Railroad, and the Lackawanna and Wyoming Valley Railroad (LWV), with routes radiating in all directions, to New York state's Southern Tier, to several points in Pennsylvania, and to parts of North Jersey. The CNJ station and the DLW station were the last to lose passenger service, in the early 1950s and in 1970, respectively.

Freight rail remains important in Scranton. The Norfolk Southern Railway runs freight trains on the former Delaware, Lackawanna & Western (DL&W) line between Scranton and Binghamton, New York, having taken over operations from the Canadian Pacific Railway (Delaware and Hudson Railway division) in 2015. The Reading Blue Mountain and Northern Railroad serves the former DL&W Keyser Valley branch in the city.

The Delaware-Lackawanna Railroad, as designated operator of county-owned rail lines, oversees the former Delaware and Hudson line from Scranton north to Carbondale, the former DL&W line east to the Delaware Water Gap and the former Lackawanna and Wyoming Valley Railroad third-rail interurban streetcar line south to Montage Mountain, Moosic and the Minooka Industrial Track. These lines host the seasonal passenger trains of both the Steamtown National Historic Site and the Electric City Trolley Museum and are under the jurisdiction of the Pennsylvania Northeast Regional Railroad Authority.

The PNRRA was created by Lackawanna County and Monroe County to oversee the use of common rail freight lines in Northeastern Pennsylvania, including one formerly owned by Conrail running from Scranton, through the Pocono Mountains towards New Jersey and New York City markets.

One of its primary objectives is to reestablish rail passenger service to Hoboken, New Jersey and New York City. Regular passenger train service to Scranton is slated to be restored under a plan to extend NJ Transit service from Hoboken via the Lackawanna Cut-Off. That project is ongoing as rail is being laid down in New Jersey. The trains would pass the Lackawanna Station building and pull in at the new Scranton station on Lackawanna Avenue along the northernmost track east of Bridge 60, the railroad bridge over the Lackawanna River, and the Cliff Street underpass. In December 2023, the Federal Railroad Administration granted $500,000 for planning studies into the Scranton to New York City corridor to fulfill step 1 of its Corridor Identification and Development Program.

=== Cabs ===
Private operators such as Burgit's Electric City Taxi service the Scranton area, but they are hired by telephone through central dispatch and cannot be hailed on the street as in larger cities.

== Government ==
=== Fire department ===
The Bureau of Fire was incorporated as a paid service in 1901. It is a full-time service consisting of about 142 firefighters. Its headquarters is on Mulberry Street in Central City. The fire department has seven operating fire stations. It has nine firefighting vehicles, including five engines, two trucks (ladders), one rescue, and an assistant chief's vehicle.

=== Police ===
The Scranton Police Department includes patrol, investigative, and specialized units, with officers assigned across several neighborhood sectors in the city. Units include motorized patrol, walking beats, and a bike patrol, along with a canine unit that currently fields three K‑9 officers, with a fourth planned. The department has adopted new technology such as drones and a mobile command center as part of its special operations capabilities.

== In popular culture ==
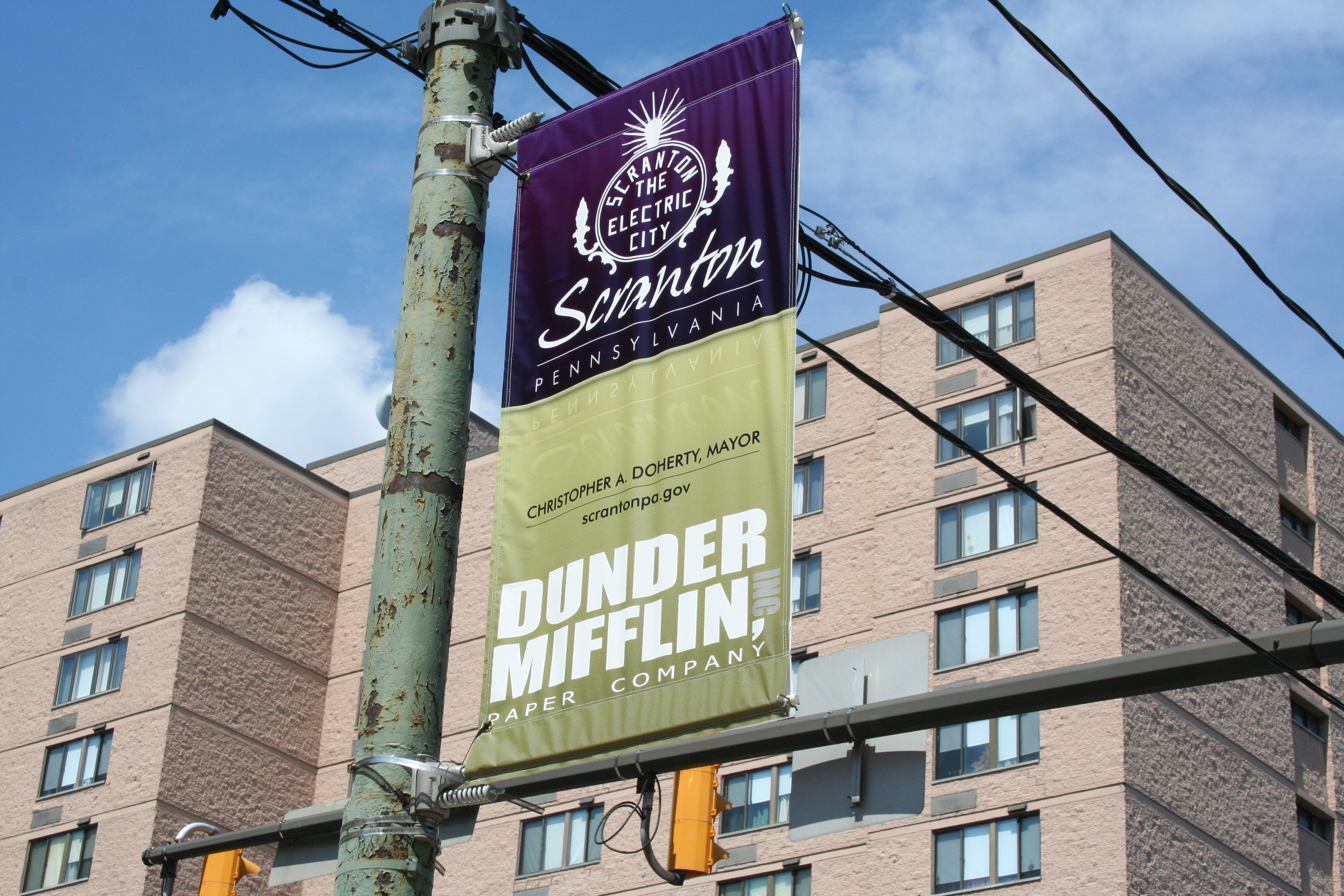
A banner promoting Dunder Mifflin, the fictional paper company on NBC's The Office, hangs in downtown Scranton.

- The Harry Chapin song "30,000 Pounds of Bananas" is about an actual fatal 1965 accident in Scranton, where a driver hauling bananas lost control of his truck as it barreled down Moosic Street.
- The 2010 American film Blue Valentine, starring Michelle Williams and Ryan Gosling, was partially filmed in Scranton.
- The film adaptation of the Pulitzer Prize for Drama and Tony Award winning play That Championship Season is set in and was filmed in Scranton.
- The city is home to the Pennsylvania Paper and Supply Company, which was the inspiration for a branch of the fictional paper company Dunder Mifflin on NBC's series The Office. The Scranton branch is the setting for the majority of the show's episodes.
- The city was the setting of the home of Roy Munson (portrayed by Woody Harrelson) in the 1996 American sports comedy Kingpin. Scenes were shot in Pittsburgh as a stand in for Scranton.
- The city is imagined as a member of the class of interstellar Okies in James Blish's 1962 novel A Life for the Stars, in which 2273 AD Scranton, equipped with a space drive, flies away and leaves an impoverished Earth behind.
- In 2017, Scranton got national recognition from late night television host John Oliver when he made jokes about how infatuated Scranton community members were with the little train that runs during the weather reports on Scranton's ABC-affiliated TV station WNEP-TV. The train had been featured in multiple of their "Talkback 16" segments. After a follow-up segment, Oliver donated a train set to WNEP. It was too big for their backyard, so they donated it to the Electric City Trolley Museum.
- Musician John Legend was the head of the music department and choir director of Scranton's Bethel AME Church from 1995 to 2004.
- Lyricist Richard Bernhard Smith wrote the song, "Winter Wonderland", while being treated at the West Mountain Sanitarium in Scranton for tuberculosis.
- American singer, actress and television personality Cher lived in Scranton as a baby and spent time at a Catholic orphanage in the city run by the Sisters of Mercy. Cher wrote about the experience in the song, "Sisters of Mercy".
- American author and film & television producer Dick Wolf was married to Susan Scranton, daughter of former Governor William Scranton, from 1970 to 1983.
- American radio talk show host, television broadcaster, and politician Dan Patrick began his broadcast career at WNEP-TV in Scranton.
- American conservative commentator, journalist, author, and television host Bill O'Reilly's early television career began at WNEP-TV in Scranton, where he served as a news and weather reporter, and as a news anchor later on.

== Sister cities ==
Scranton has the following official sister cities:

- Caronia, Sicily, Italy
- Guardia Lombardi, Campania, Italy
- Perugia, Umbria, Italy
- Ballina, County Mayo, Connacht, Ireland
- Naga, Camarines Sur, Philippines
- Balakovo, Saratov Oblast, Russia
- San Marino, San Marino
- Trnava, Trnava Region, Slovakia
- Little Rock, Arkansas, United States

== See also ==
- Farley's Eatery and Pub
- The Office
- Polish Cathedral style
- Scranton Area Community Foundation
- Scranton Army Ammunition Plant
- USS Scranton, 4 ships
- Weston Field

== Gallery ==
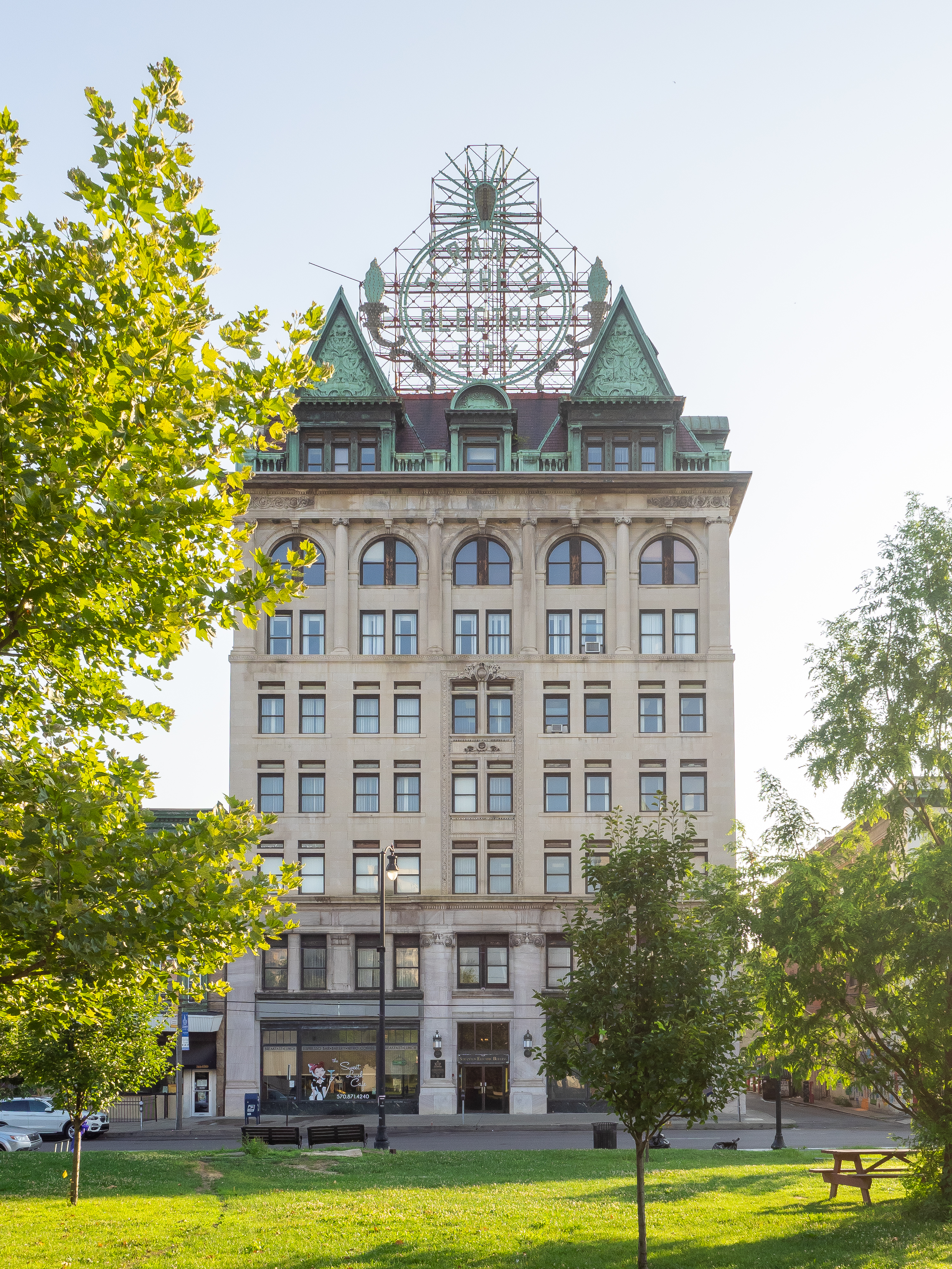
Scranton Electric Building

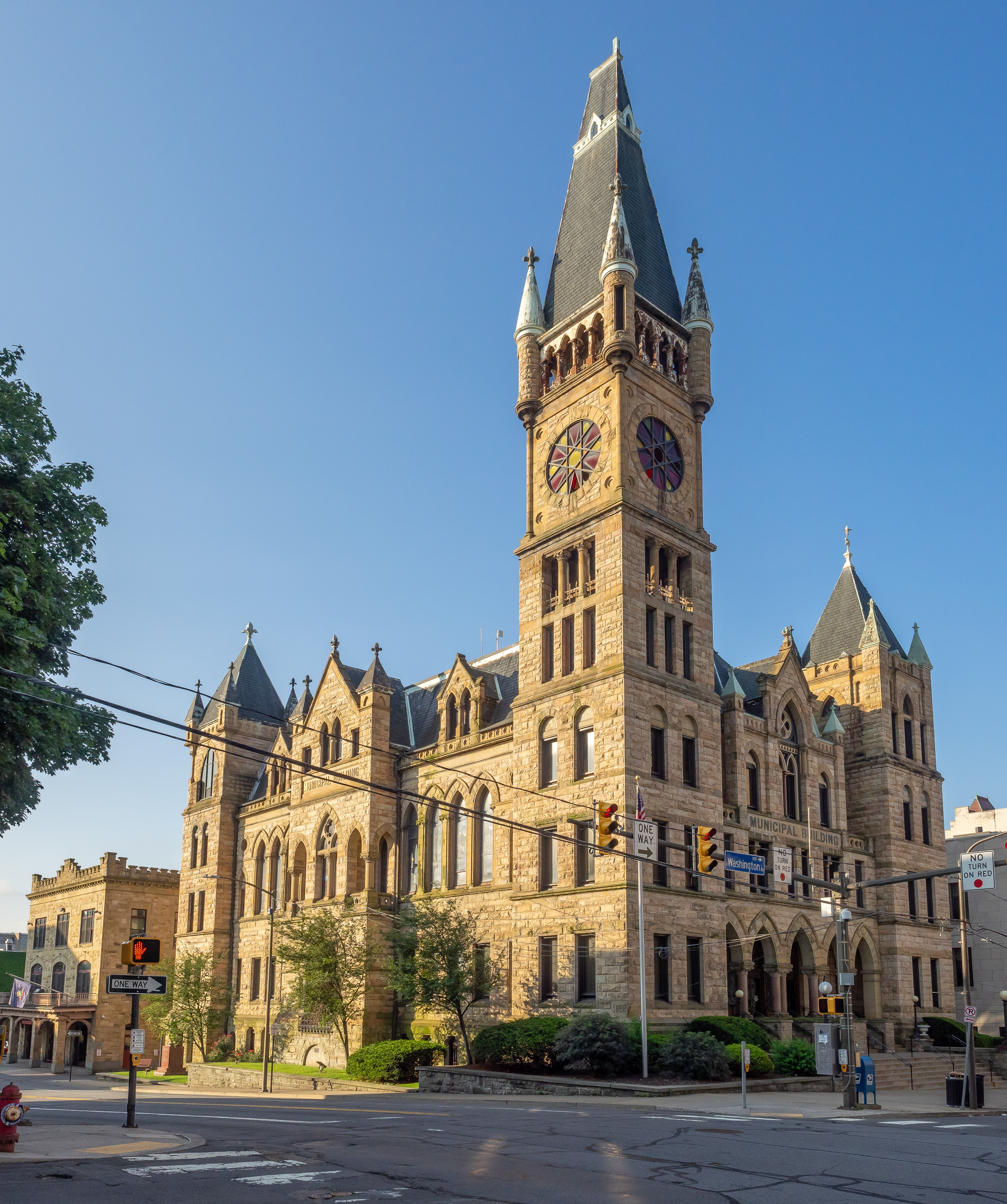
Scranton City Hall

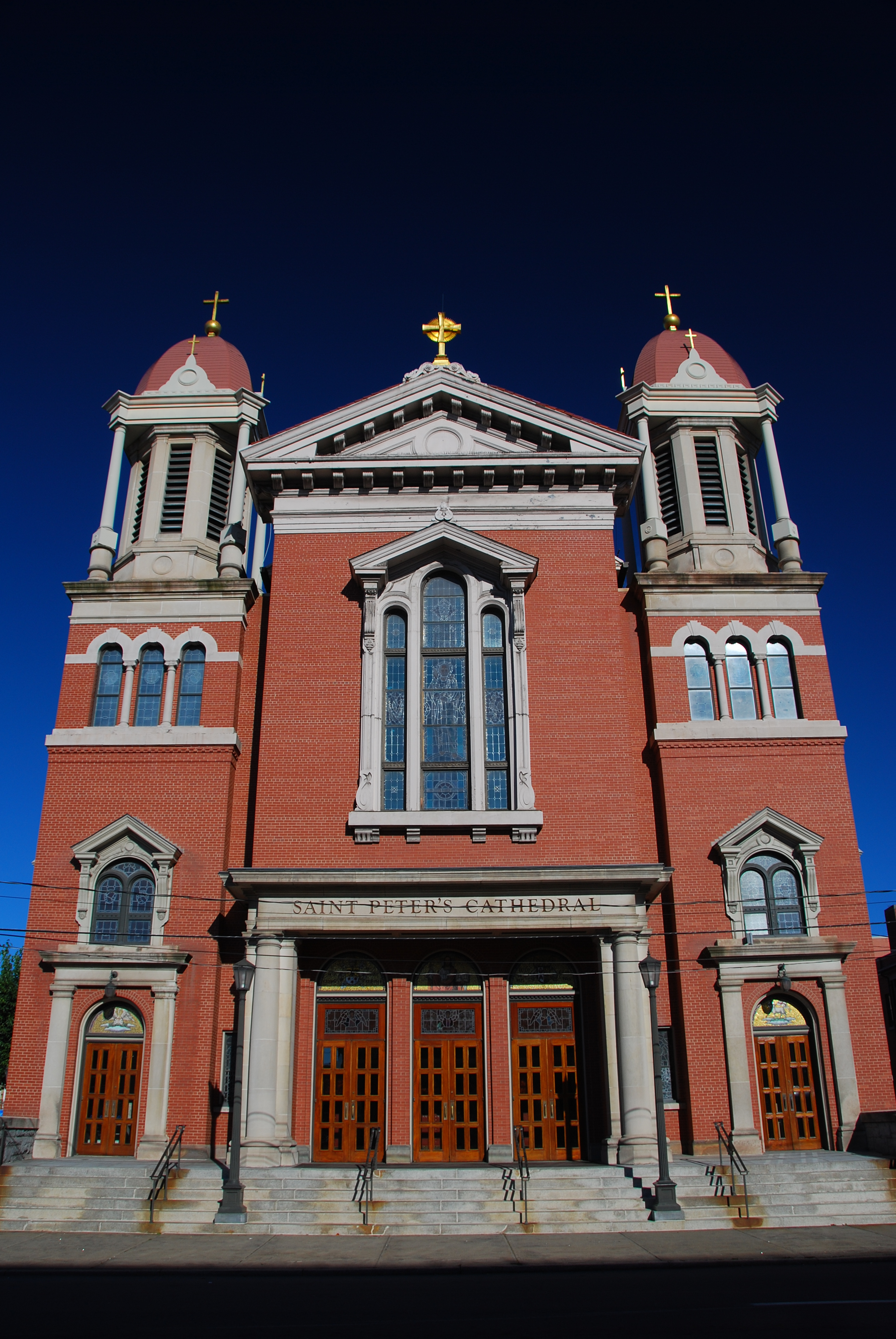
St. Peter's Cathedral

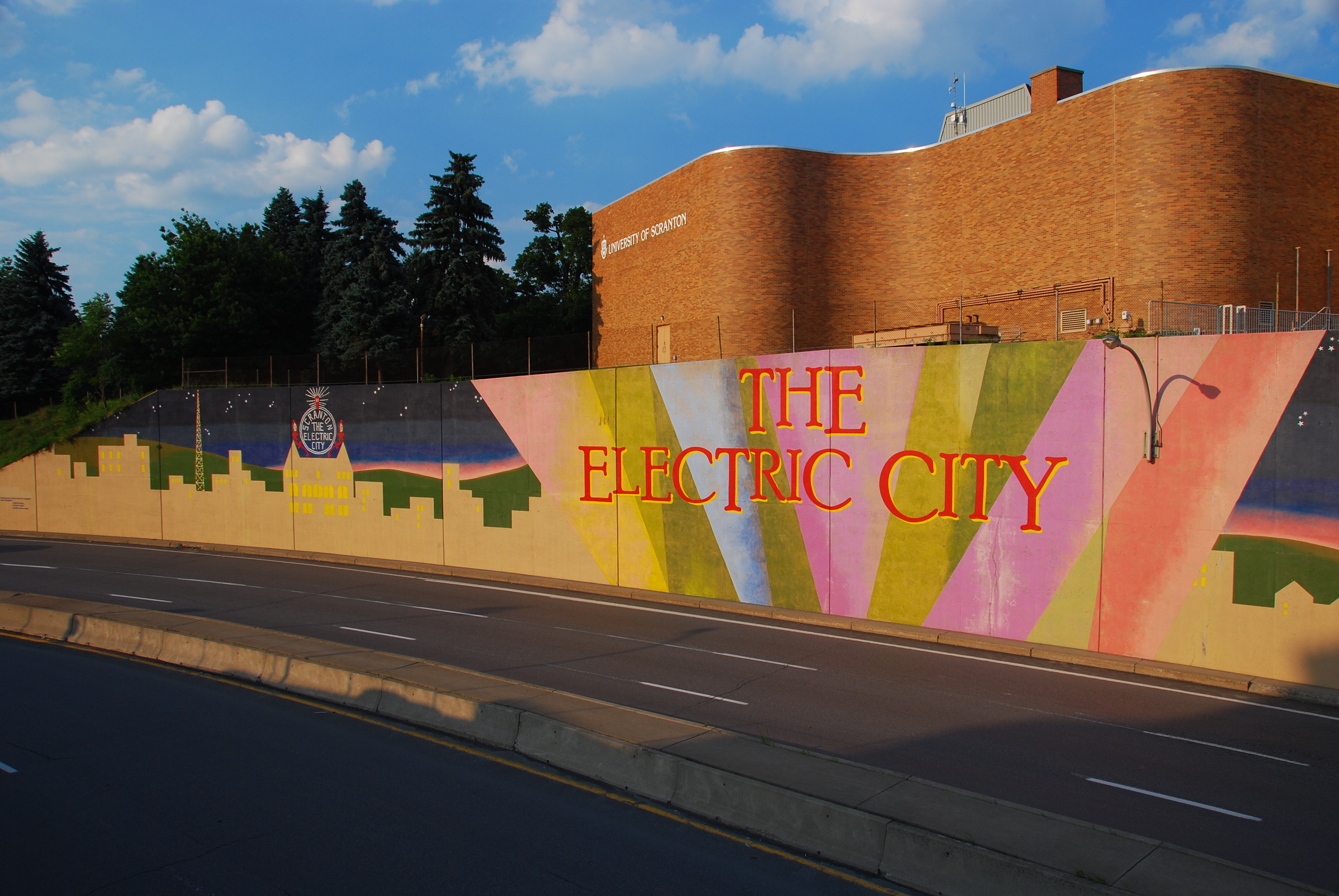
Electric City Mural

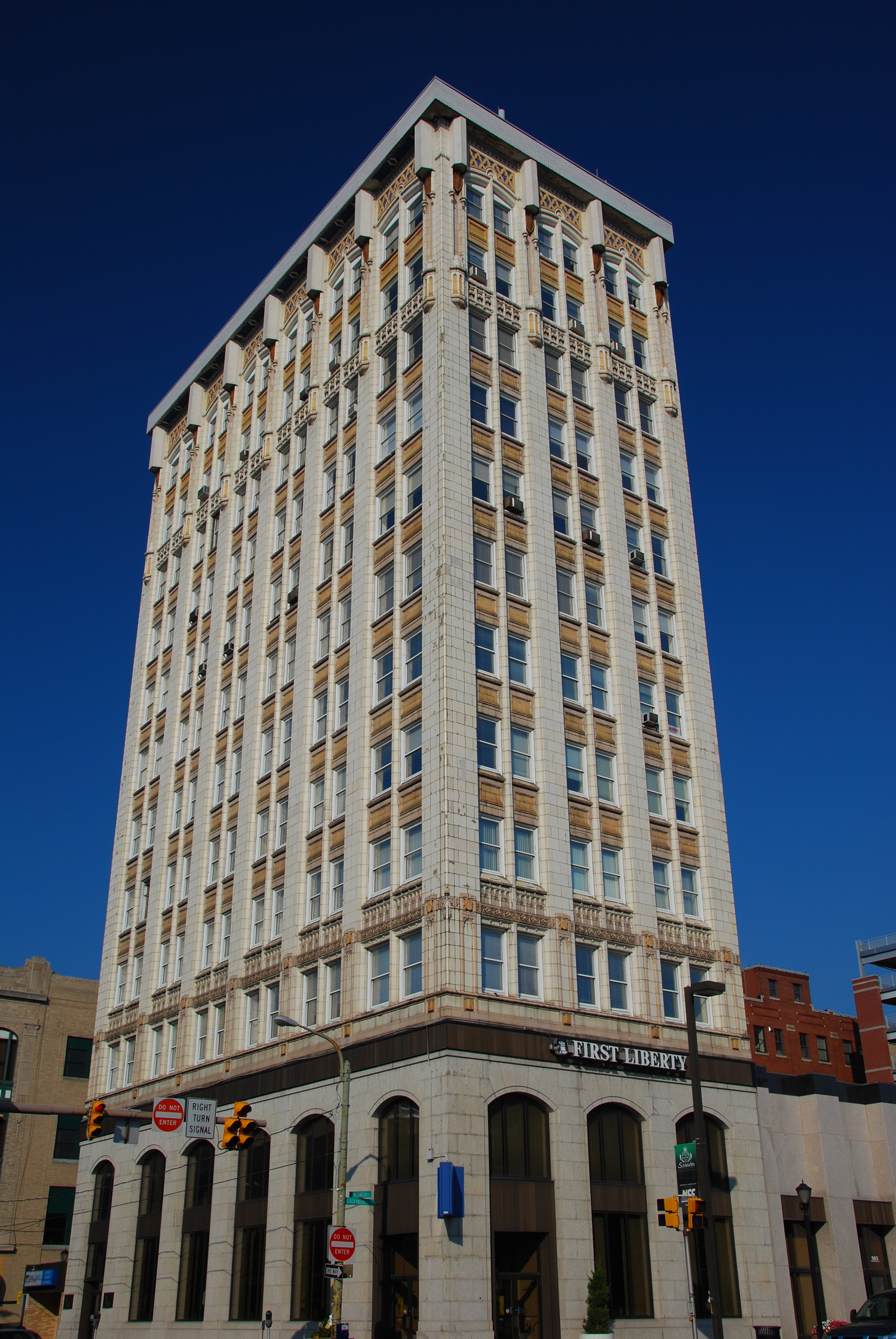
First Liberty Building

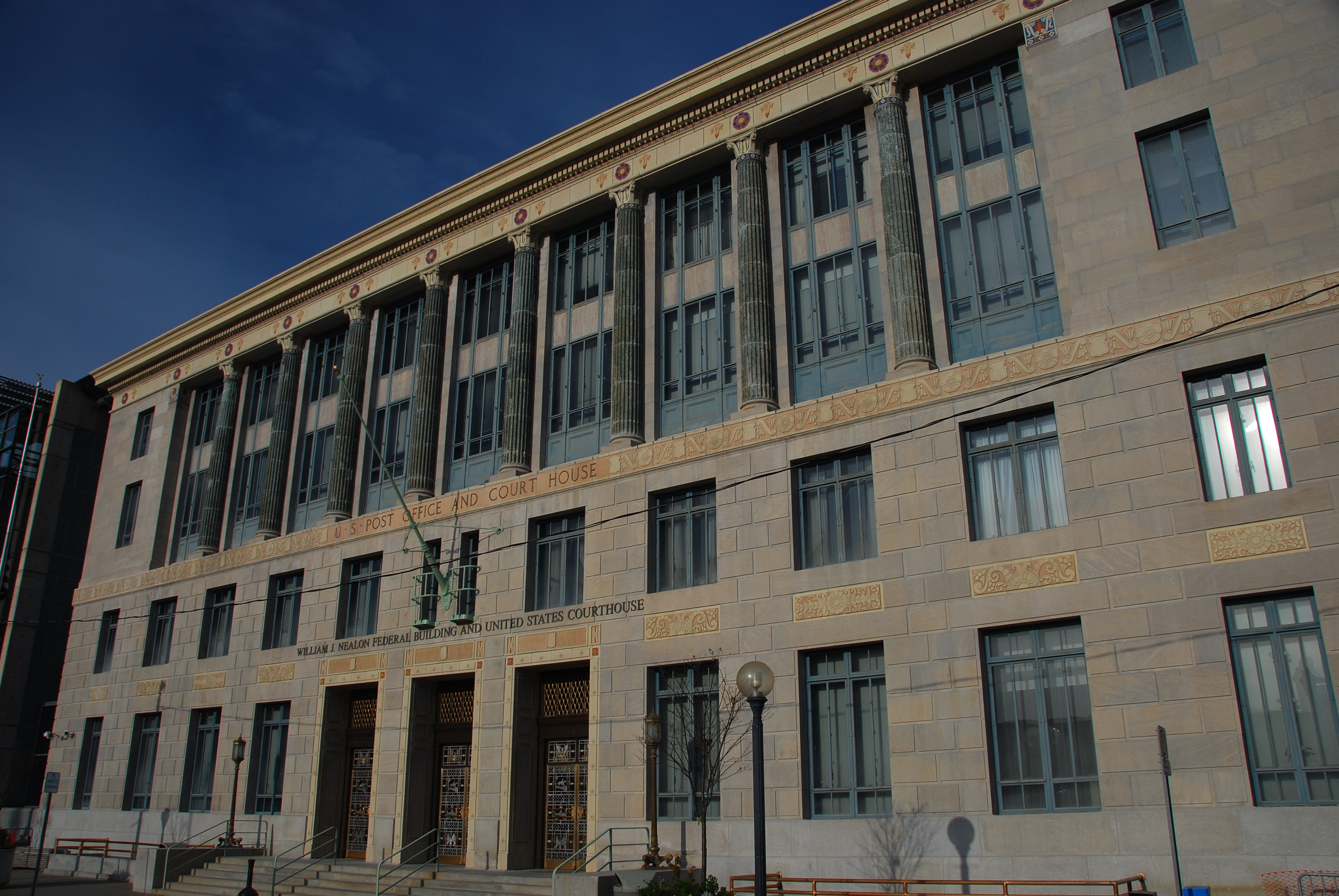
US Post Office and Federal Building

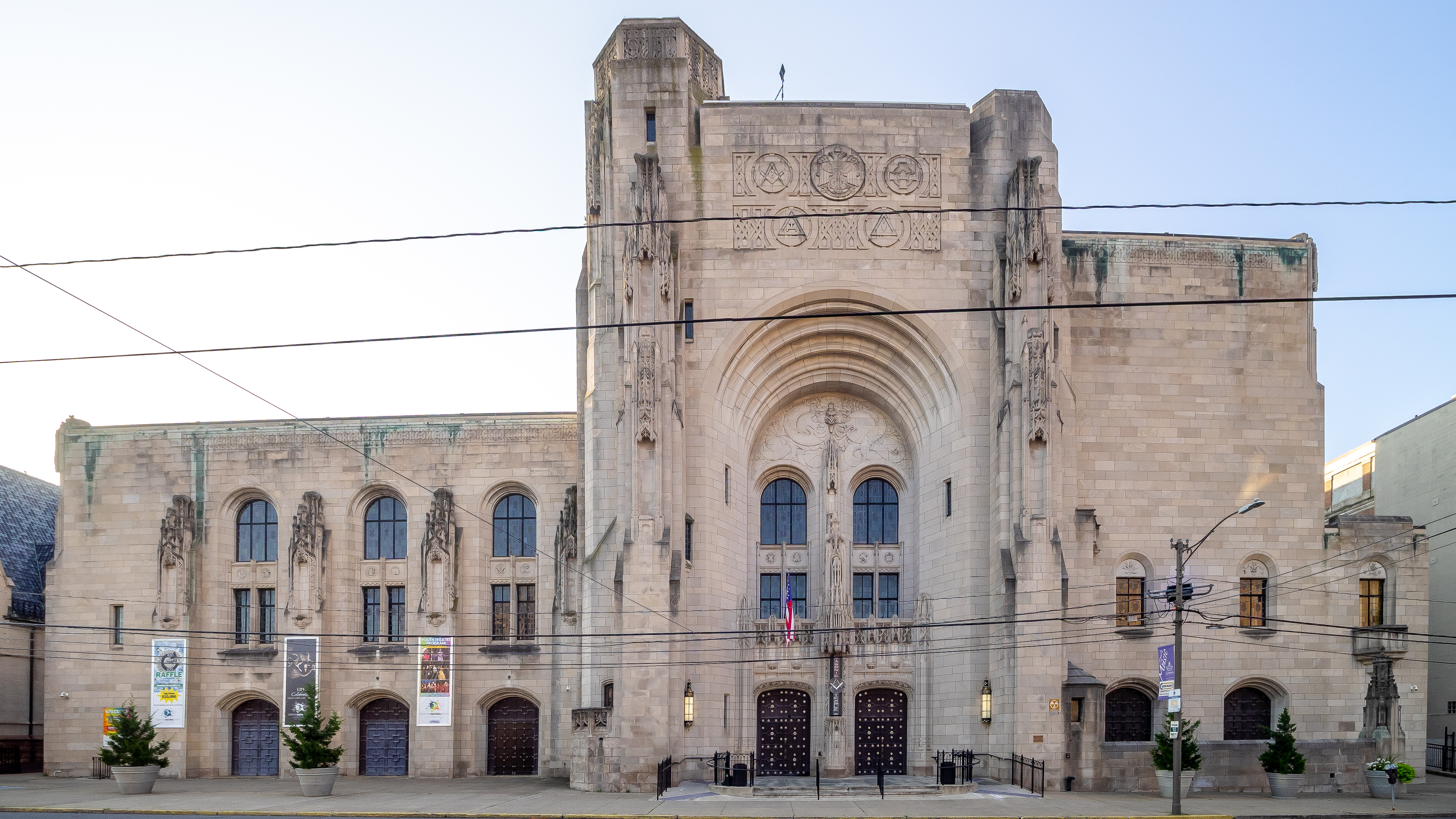
Scranton Cultural Center

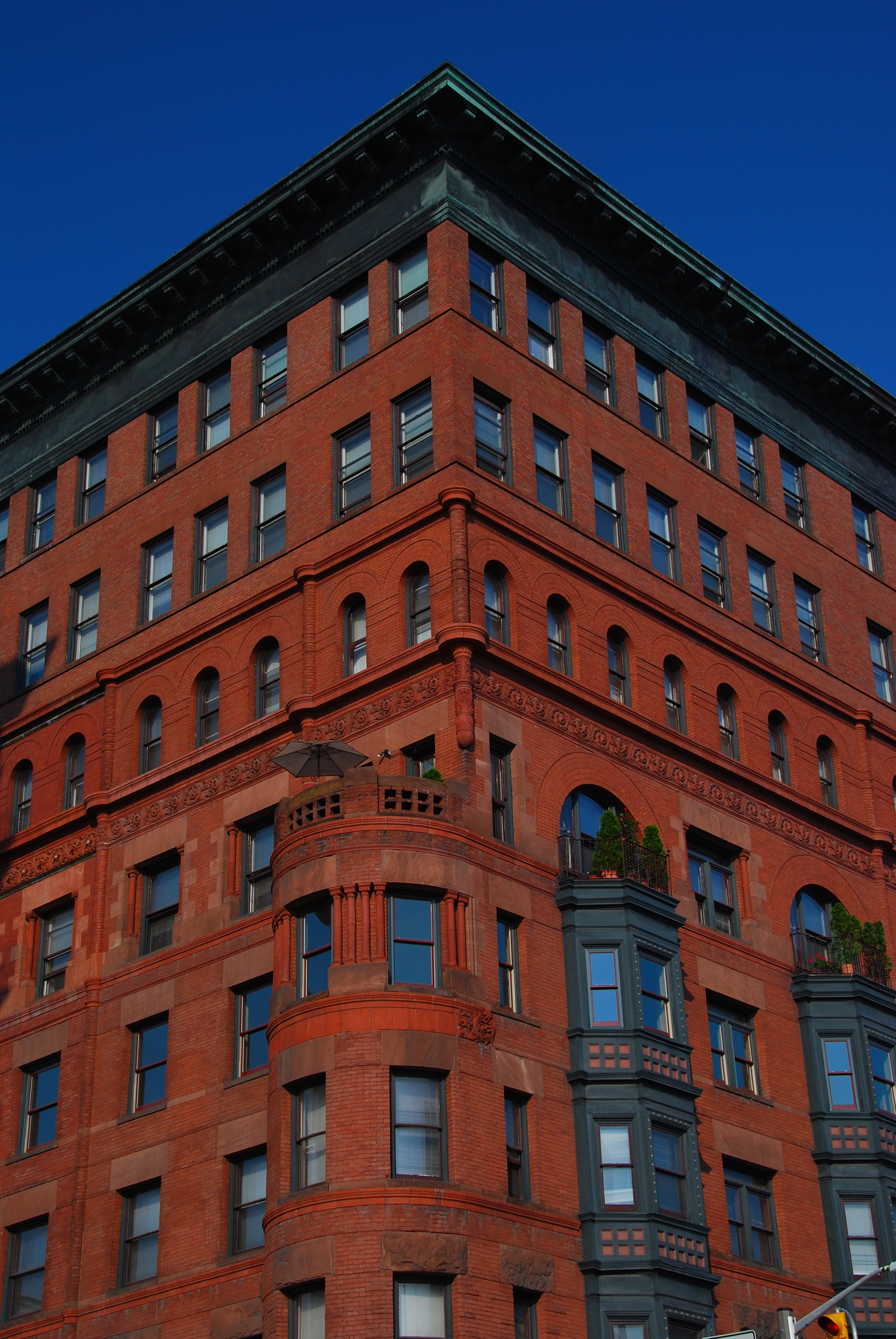
Brooks Building

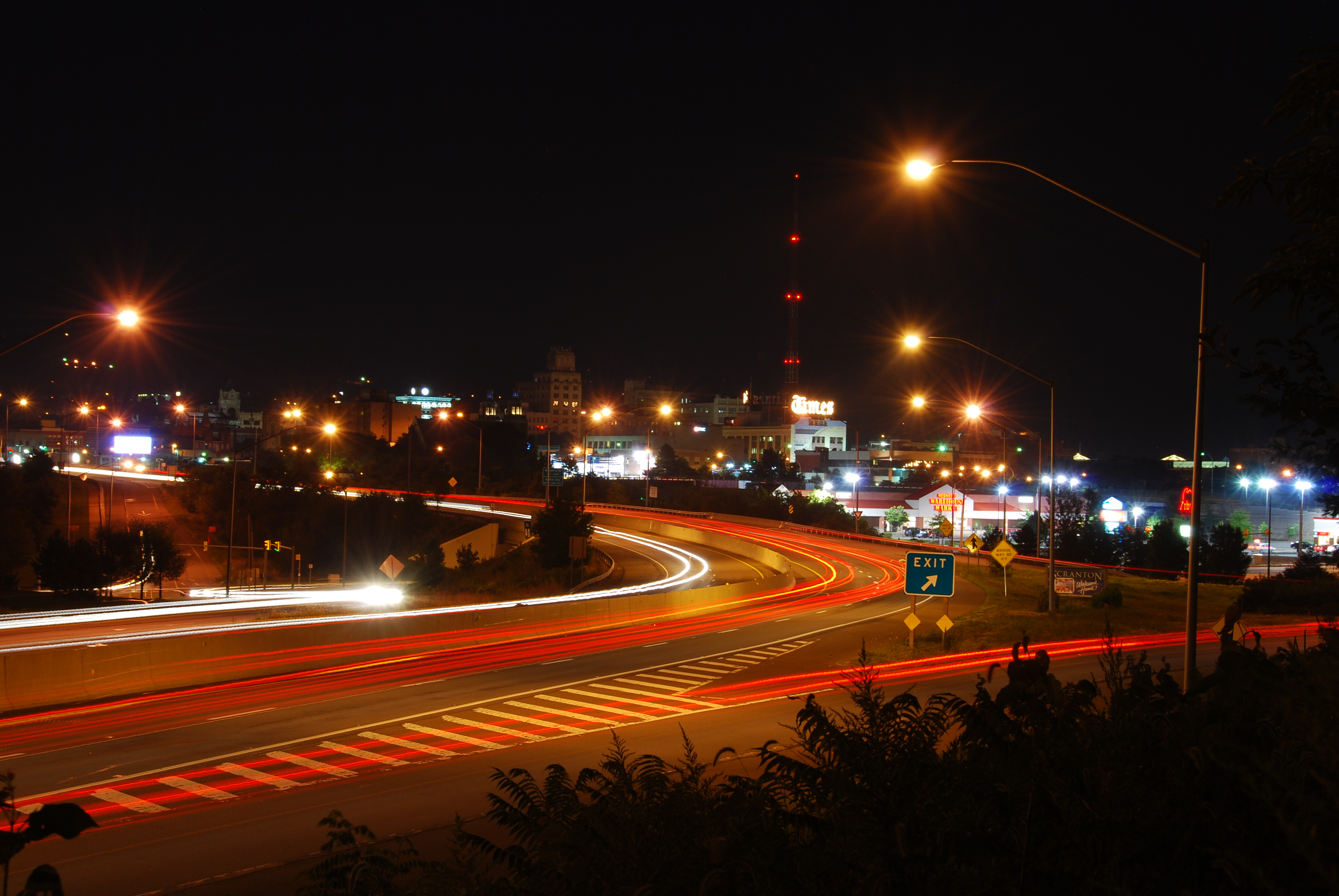
Downtown Scranton at night

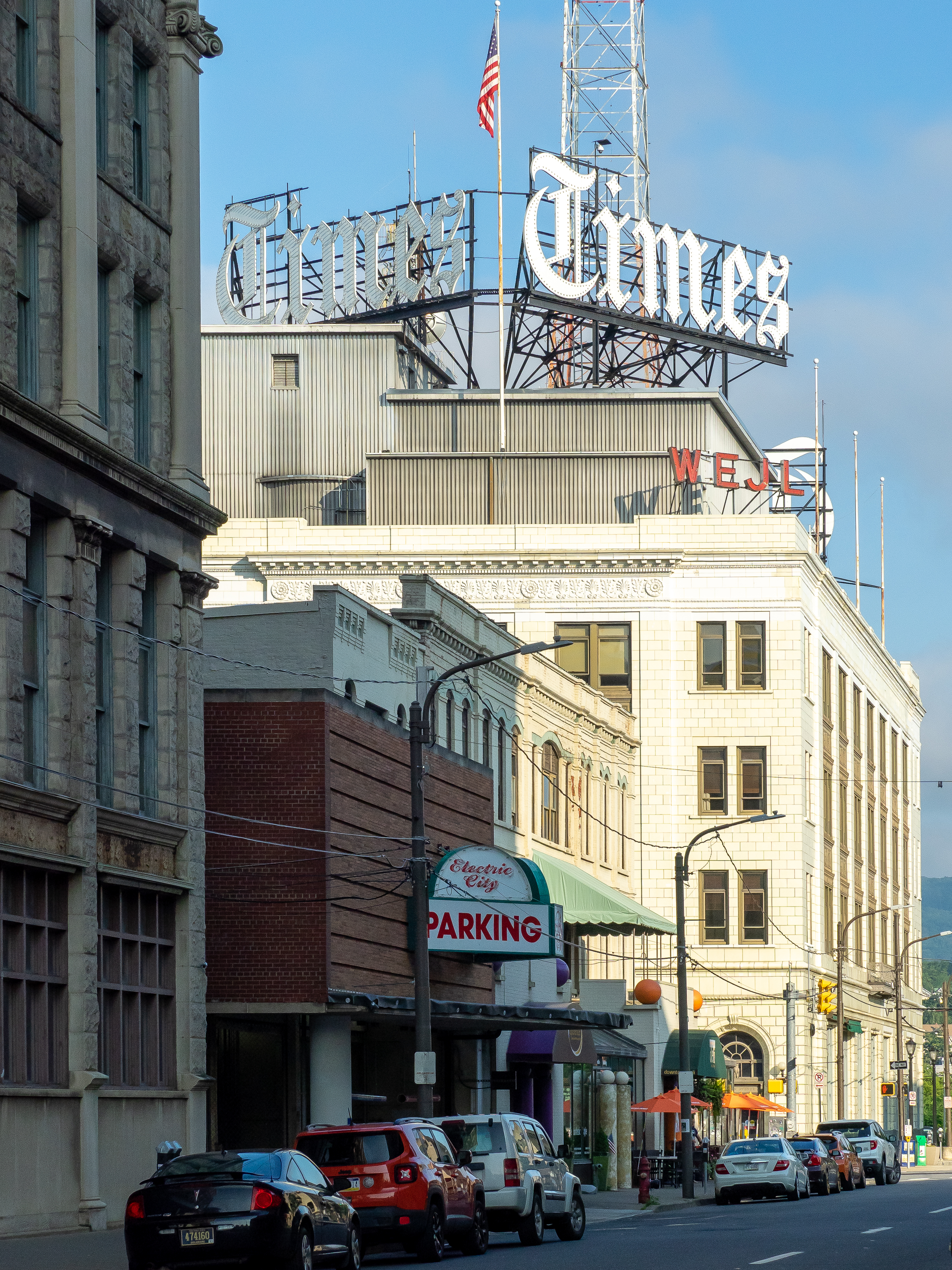
Scranton Times Building

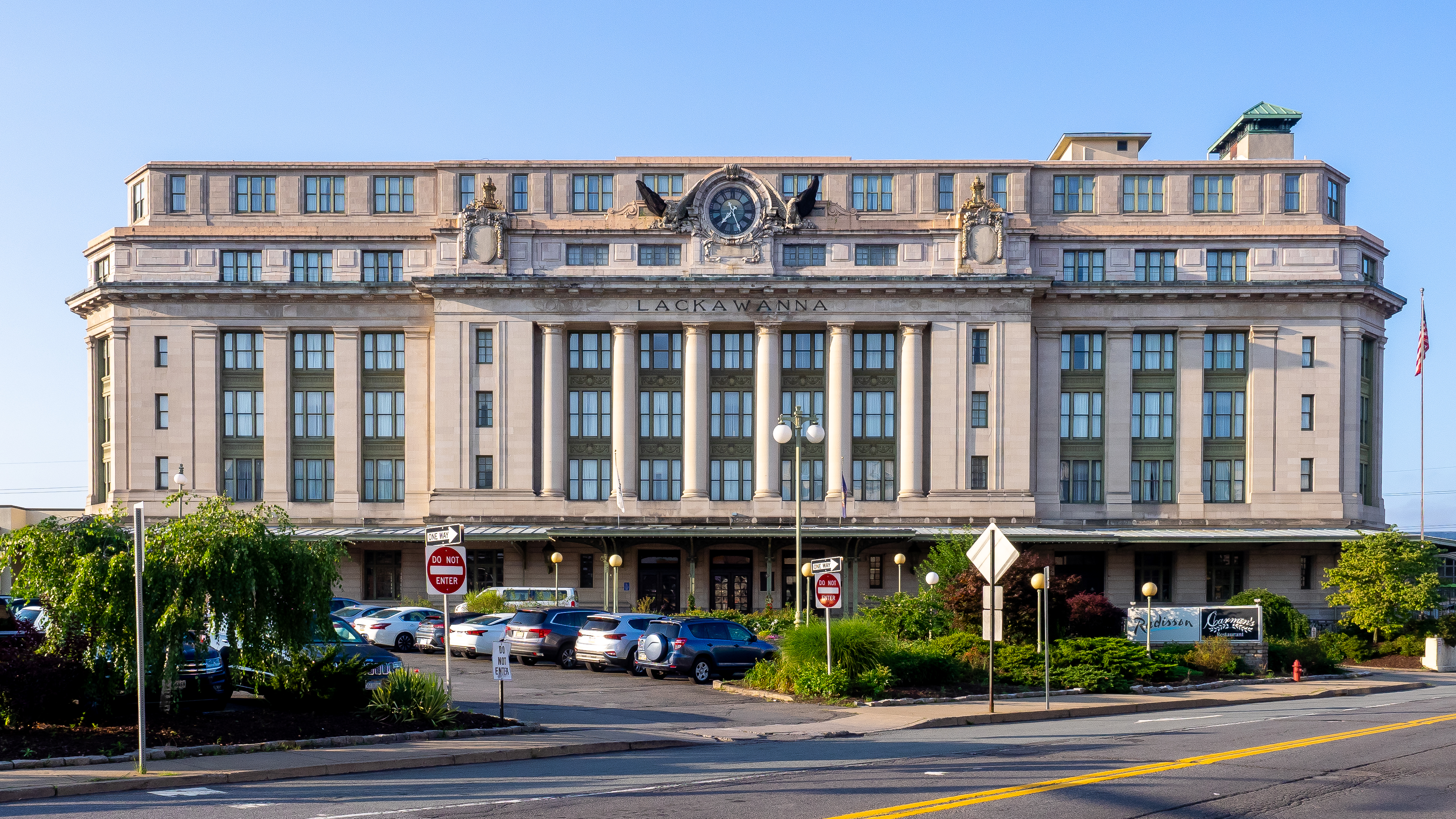
Lackawanna Station Hotel
