= Weston Field =

Weston Field may refer to any of several Fields

- Weston Field (Scranton), a community facility in Scranton, Pennsylvania
- Weston Field (Williamstown), a stadium in Williamstown, Massachusetts
