= Farley's Eatery and Pub =

Restaurant in Scranton, Pennsylvania, United States

Coordinates: 41.4083°N 75.6608°W

- Entrance of Farley's Eatery and Pub in Scranton, Pennsylvania.
- Company type: Private
- Headquarters: Scranton, Pennsylvania, United States

Farley's Eatery & Pub was a restaurant in downtown Scranton, Pennsylvania, United States, and was considered a staple of Scrantonian culinary culture. Farley's promoted itself as having "the best steak and seafood in downtown Scranton." Farley's Eatery & Pub closed in 2012 after 30 years of business. At the time it closed, it was described as one of the oldest businesses in downtown Scranton.

In recent times, it garnered fame from being mentioned on television series The Office. The series, set in Scranton, made reference to the restaurant in a 2005 episode in which it was suggested that the losers of an office warehouse basketball game would buy the winners dinner from the pub. Actor Steve Carell, who portrays Michael Scott in the NBC sitcom, said in the DVD commentary that he would personally fly to Scranton to "cut the ribbon" if Farley's were to place a "Michael Scott Burger" on their menu. The burger was later added.
