= Regional Sky =

American airline

IATA	ICAO	Call sign
4P	—	—
- Founded: 2018
- Commenced operations: 2018
- Operating bases: Wilkes-Barre/Scranton International Airport
- Fleet size: 3
- Destinations: 3
- Headquarters: Avoca, Pennsylvania
- Website: publiccharters.com

Regional Sky is an airline based at Wilkes-Barre/Scranton International Airport and headquartered in Avoca, Pennsylvania. It flies scheduled commuter flights and charter flights marketed by Public Charters, LLC.

== History ==
In April 2018, Regional Sky began their first scheduled flight, from Wilkes-Barre/Scranton to Pittsburgh International Airport, using the Piper Navajo. The flight was halted in August 2018, just 4 months later

In July 2019, the carrier acquired its first turboprop aircraft, a Beech King Air 200, and marketed it for charters as a 30-minute trip to New York City for busy area executives.

In February 2020, the airline scheduled public charter flights for sale through Public Charters LLC from Wilkes-Barre to Atlantic City International Airport and Baltimore/Washington International Airport.

It marketed itself alongside Texas Sky and North Country Sky, which were operated by Corporate Flight Management, now known as Contour Airlines. Corporate Flight Management's flights were also sold by Public Charters, LLC. North Country Sky and Texas Sky are no longer in operation as of 2020, as both lost their Essential Air Service contracts.

== Fleet ==
- 1 x King Air 200
- 1 x Piper PA-31 Navajo
- 1 x Piper PA-31P-350 Mojave
