= USS Scranton =

Four U.S. Navy ships have been named USS Scranton:

- USS Scranton (ID-3511), a transport that served in the U.S. Navy from 1918 to 1919. Both before and after this service, she served as the merchant steamer SS Pennsylvanian.
- Scranton (PF-63), a Tacoma-class frigate renamed USS Moberly on 28 June 1944, five months after she was launched
- USS Scranton (CA-138), an Oregon City-class cruiser laid down on 27 December 1944; construction canceled on 12 August 1945 and unlaunched hull was scrapped on the slipway
- USS Scranton (SSN-756), a Los Angeles-class submarine commissioned in 1991; presently in service as of 2013
