= Weston Field (Scranton) =

Community facility in Scranton, Pennsylvania

Coordinates: 41.42491°N 75.66623°W

Weston Field is a community sports facility in Scranton, Pennsylvania, United States, built in about 1916 and named for Charles Weston.
