= Frederick Turner (unionist) =

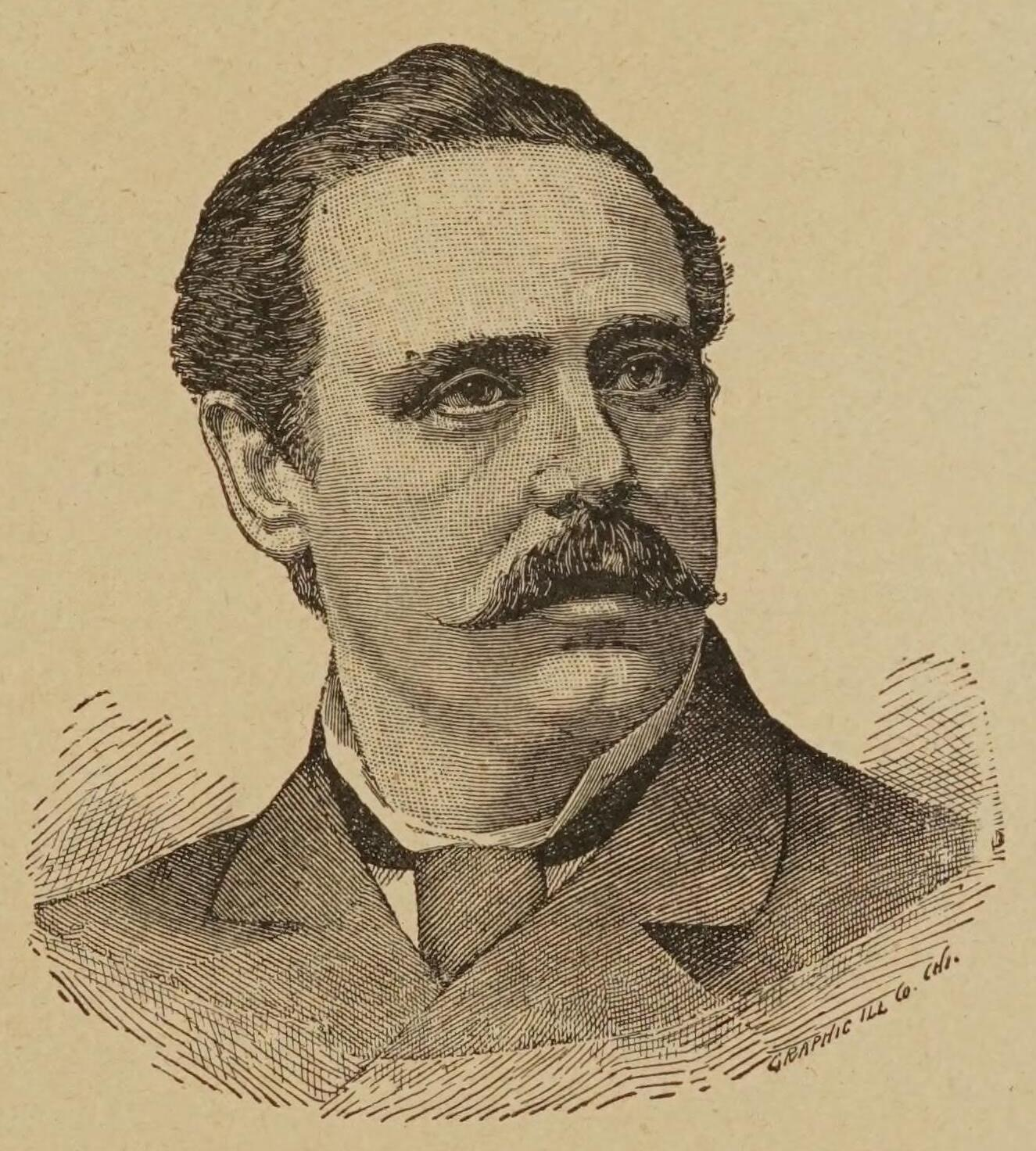
Engraving of Turner published 1891

Frederick Turner (born May 12, 1846) was a British-born American labor unionist.

== Biography ==
Born in Crewkerne in England, Turner emigrated to the United States in 1856, settling in Philadelphia. He served in the American Civil War. In 1882, he began working as a clerk in the Quartermasters' Department in Washington DC, but in 1883, he left to undertake an apprenticeship as a gold beater.

In 1873, Turner heard about the Knights of Labor. He decided a union was needed in his own industry, and so he organized 40 of his colleagues into local number 20 of the Knights. The following year, he formed a local of gold beaters in New York, the first local of the Knights in the state, and then another local in Boston. These achievements impressed his fellow unionists that he was elected as District Financial Secretary of the union's District Assembly 1, covering Philadelphia, but in effect the leading body of the union. In 1876, he was additionally elected as District Recording Secretary. That year, he also organized two locals in Pittsburgh.

Turner found himself blacklisted due to his union activities, and in 1877, the Knights set him up in business as a grocer. A national leadership was established for the union, and Turner was elected to its executive board in 1880. He was elected as general secretary of the union in 1883, then from 1884, he held the new post of secretary-treasurer. In 1886, the role was split again, and he became treasurer of the union.

In 1888, the role of secretary-treasurer was recreated. The union's leader, Terence V. Powderly, recommended John Hayes for the post. When Hayes defeated Turner in a vote, Turner felt pushed out. He worked with Victor Drury, Henry G. Taylor, James L. Wright, R. N. Keen, R. C. McCauley, and Joseph N. Kennedy, to call for reforms to the union, including a return to the swearing of secret oaths. The group were expelled, and established a new Founders' Order, but this proved unsuccessful, and was defunct before the end of 1889.

Turner returned to his trade as a gold beater, and settled in Jersey City, where he was still living in 1902.

Trade union offices
Preceded by Robert D. Layton	General Secretary of the Knights of Labor; 1883–1884	Succeeded by Post merged
Preceded by Richard Griffiths as Grand Treasurer	Secretary-Treasurer of the Knights of Labor; 1884–1886	Succeeded by Charles H. Litchman as General Secretary
Preceded by Post recreated	Treasurer of the Knights of Labor; 1886–1888	Succeeded by John Hayes as Secretary-Treasurer
