= John Hayes (unionist) =

American labor union leader

John William Hayes (December 26, 1854 – December, 1942) was an American labor union leader.

Born in Philadelphia, Hayes became a brakeman on the Pennsylvania Railroad, in which service, he lost his right arm. He then became a telegraph operator, but was sacked during the telegraphers' strike of 1883, and instead became a grocer.

Hayes joined the Knights of Labor, and was elected to its executive board in 1884. He was elected as the union's secretary-treasurer in 1888. By 1893, he was in dispute with the union's leader, General Master Workman Terence V. Powderly. Although both were re-elected as that year's annual general assembly, Powderly was unable to put together an executive board, and resigned.

By 1900, the union was led by John N. Parsons. Hayes alleged that Parsons was not completing work, and had not called meetings of the executive board. Parsons obtained an injunction barring Hayes from handling money or mail for the union, but Hayes obtained a counter-injunction which gave him control of the union's apparatus. In 1902, Hayes was elected as General Master Workman, serving until the union was dissolved, in 1917.

Hayes was also editor of the union's journal, and its associated National Labor Digest newspaper. After 1917, he continued to publish the Digest, and to use the title "General Master Workman". He became a manager with the Atlantic Gas Construction Company, and was president of the North Chesapeake Beach Land and Improvement Company.

Trade union offices
Preceded by Charles H. Litchman as General Secretary; Frederick Turner as General Treasurer	Secretary-Treasurer of the Knights of Labor; 1888–1902	Succeeded by Isaac D. Chamberlain
Preceded by Henry A. Hicks	General Master Workman of the Knights of Labor; 1902–1917	Succeeded by Union dissolved
