= Mary Stirling =

American labor unionist

Mary Stirling was an American labor unionist active in the late 19th and early 20th centuries.

Stirling worked as a shoemaker in Philadelphia. In 1880, she joined a new Knights of Labor local, Garfield Assembly No. 1684, which she co-led with Mary Hanafin.

In 1883, Stirling was elected as one of eight District 1 delegates to the national Knights of Labor convention. The conventions had previously been all-male, but union leader Terence V. Powderly ruled that women should be admitted on an equal basis with men. Stirling was appointed Grand Venerable Sage of the convention and received three votes for Grand Worthy Foreman, the second-highest office in the union.

In 1885, she was re-elected as General Venerable Sage at the union’s convention and appointed secretary of a Knights of Labor committee to collect data on women and work. In 1886, she received seven votes in the election for chair of the co-operative board.

As of 1902, Stirling was still residing in Philadelphia, working as the forewoman of a department in a large shoe factory.
