= 1892 United States House of Representatives election in Wyoming =

- November 8, 1892
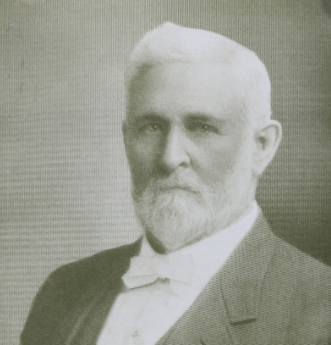

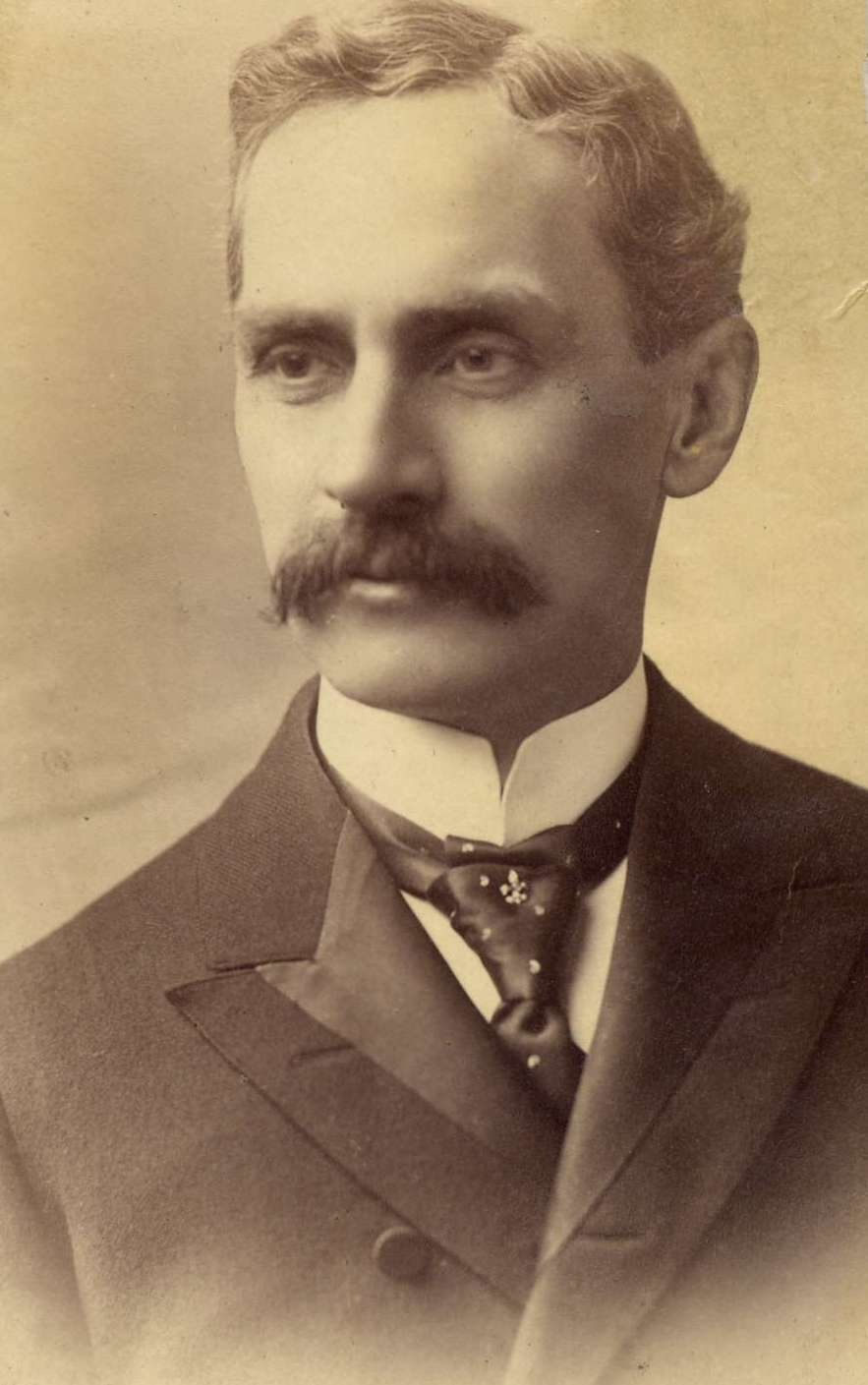
Nominee	Henry A. Coffeen	Clarence D. Clark
Party	Democratic	Republican
Popular vote	8,855	8,394
Percentage	51.34%	48.66%
- County results Coffeen: 50–60% 60–70% Clark: 50–60% No Data
U.S. Representative before election
Clarence D. Clark
Republican
Elected U.S. Representative
Henry A. Coffeen
Democratic

The Wyoming United States House election for 1892 was held on November 3, 1892. Democratic Henry A. Coffeen defeated Republican incumbent Clarence D. Clark with 51.34% of the vote making Clark the first incumbent Representative from Wyoming to lose reelection.

== Results ==
United States House of Representatives election in Wyoming, 1892
Party	Candidate	Votes	%
Democratic	Henry A. Coffeen	8,855	51.34%
Republican	Clarence D. Clark (inc.)	8,394	48.66%
Total votes		17,249	100%
