= Robert Calvin Macauley =

American labor unionist

Robert Calvin Macauley (born February 2, 1840 died November 13 1911) was an Irish-born American labor unionist.

== Biography ==
Born in County Antrim, Macauley emigrated with his family to the United States when he was nine years old. He settled in Philadelphia, and two years later he began an apprenticeship as a tailor. He soon left his first placement due to the tailor's excessive alcohol use, but trained with several other tailors, then set up his own business when he was 21.

In 1865, Macauley joined the Brotherhood of the Union, a pro-worker secret society founded by George Lippard, later joining the Knights of Pythias. The following year, he began working as a foreman in a factory, and joined the Garment Cutters' Association. He became its secretary in 1867, and held the post until the union was dissolved.

In 1869, Macauley was one of ten founders of the Knights of Labor, and became the union's first secretary. He became close to Uriah Smith Stephens, the movement's first Grand Master Workman, and the two founded a tailoring business together. The building housing this, at 1128 Market Street, became the first headquarters of the union.

In 1872, Macauley was elected to succeed Smith as Grand Master Workman. Under his leadership, a second assembly of the Knights of Labor was founded, representing ships' carpenters and caulkers, followed by eighteen other assemblies through the course of the year. However, he left the union amid a dispute about payment of a doctor's bill to a union member. He later returned to working as a foreman in a factory.

In 1880, Macauley and some other founders of the Knights of Labor established a new union, the Founders' Order of the Knights of Labor. This was not successful, and soon dissolved. His next effort was in 1890, when he established the Progressive Labor Union, which opposed strikes and admitted company owners as well as workers, but this proved similarly unsuccessful.

Macauley's son, also Robert C. Macauley, became prominent in the Single Tax Party, and was its candidate in the 1920 United States presidential election.

Trade union offices
Preceded by Uriah Smith Stephens	Grand Master Workman of the Knights of Labor (District 1); 1872	Succeeded by ?
