= 1894 United States House of Representatives election in Wyoming =

- November 6, 1894
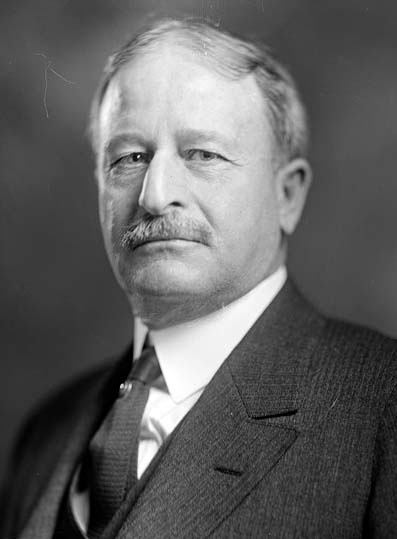

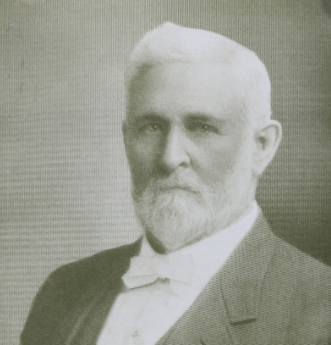
Nominee	Frank Wheeler Mondell	Henry A. Coffeen	Shakespeare E. Sealey
Party	Republican	Democratic	Populist
Popular vote	10,068	6,152	2,906
Percentage	52.64%	32.17%	15.19%
- County results Mondell: 40–50% 50–60% 60–70% Coffeen: 30–40% No Data
U.S. Representative before election
Henry A. Coffeen
Democratic
Elected U.S. Representative
Frank Wheeler Mondell
Republican

The Wyoming United States House election for 1894 was held on November 6, 1894. Republican Frank Wheeler Mondell defeated Democratic incumbent Henry A. Coffeen and Populist Shakespeare E. Sealey with 52.64% of the vote making Coffeen the second incumbent Representative from Wyoming to lose reelection.

== Results ==
United States House of Representatives election in Wyoming, 1894
Party	Candidate	Votes	%
Republican	Frank Wheeler Mondell	10,068	52.64%
Democratic	Henry A. Coffeen (inc.)	6,152	32.17%
Populist	Shakespeare E. Sealey	2,906	15.19%
Total votes		19,126	100%
