= Richard Griffiths (unionist) =

Welsh-born American labor unionist (1827–1891)

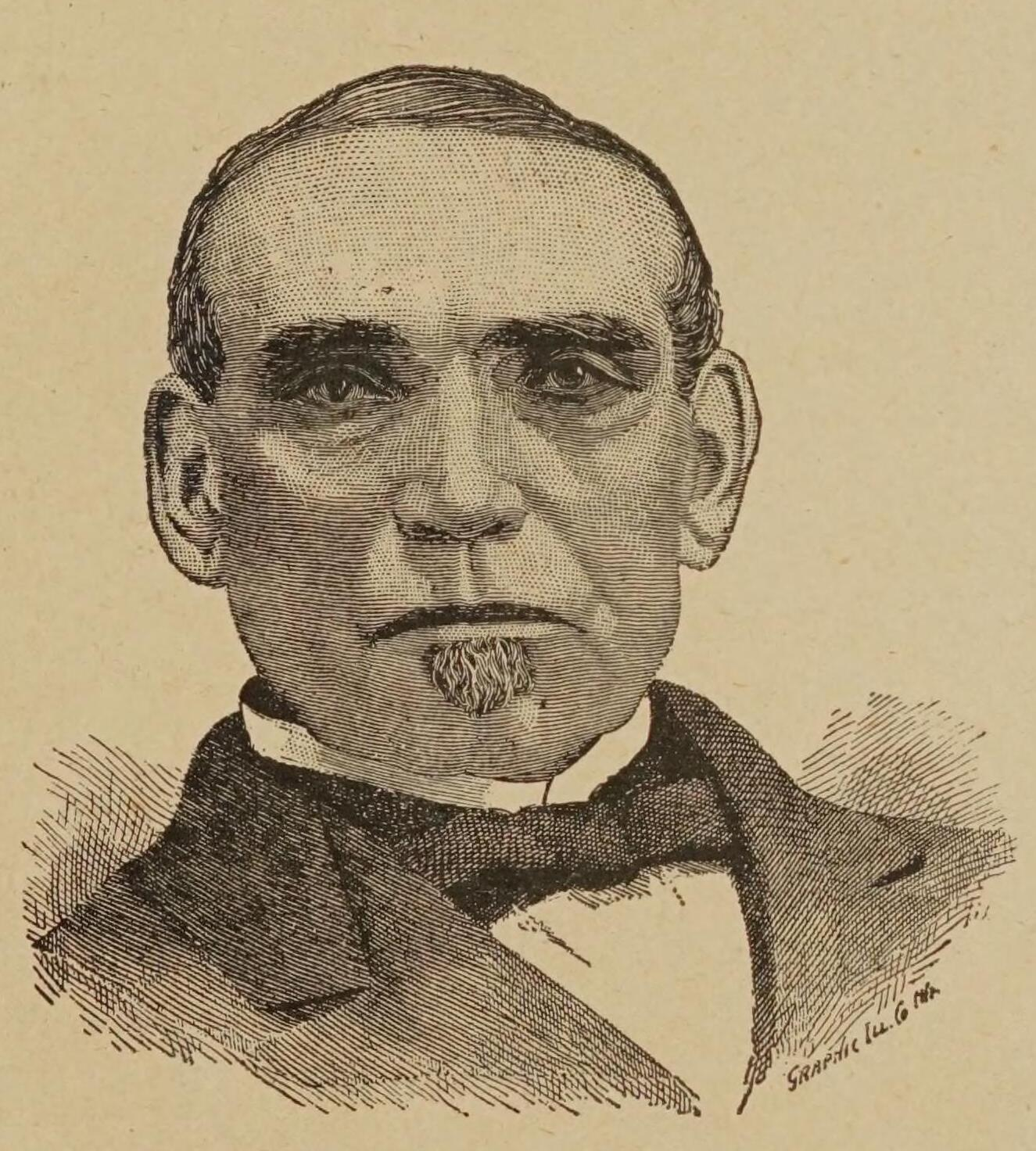
Engraving of Griffiths published 1891

Richard Griffiths (November 1827 – April 28, 1891) was a Welsh-born American labor union leader.

== Biography ==
Born in November 1827, in Swansea, Griffiths was inspired by the writings of James Cook, and he ran away from home at the age of 14 to become a cabin boy. After several trips to the West Indies, Griffiths settled in the United States, where he enrolled in the United States Marine Corps. He served on the USS United States and was later promoted to sergeant.

After leaving the marines, Griffiths settled in Hopkinton, Massachusetts, where he became a boot crimper. He moved to Milwaukee in 1864, and then to Chicago. He was a founder member of the Order of the Knights of St. Crispin, an early trade union, becoming its Deputy Grand Sir Knight in 1869. By 1871, the union was struggling, and Griffiths lost his job. He briefly moved to Detroit but soon returned to Chicago. In 1876, the union was revived, and Griffiths refounded the Chicago local, although the union soon become defunct.

In 1877, Charles Litchman inducted Griffiths into the Knights of Labor, and Griffiths established its first local in Chicago. He became its Master Workman, and from 1878 was the first person to serve as District Master Workman. In 1879, he was elected as Grand Worthy Foreman of the Knights of Labor, the union's second-in-command, serving until 1882, when he became treasurer. In 1884, he again became Grand Worthy Foreman, serving until 1888.

From 1878 to 1880, Griffiths actively supported the Greenback Party.

Trade union offices
Preceded by Terence V. Powderly	Grand Worthy Foreman of the Knights of Labor; 1879–1882	Succeeded by Ralph Beaumont
Preceded by A. M. Owens	Grand Treasurer of the Knights of Labor; 1882–1884	Succeeded by Frederick Turner as General Secretary-Treasurer
Preceded by Henry A. Coffeen	Grand Worthy Foreman of the Knights of Labor; 1884–1888	Succeeded by Morris L. Wheat
