= Leonora Barry =

Irish-American labor activist

Leonora Barry as she appeared in 1890.

Leonora M. Kearney Barry (née Kearney; after first marriage, Barry; after second marriage, Lake; 13 August 1849 – 18 July 1923) was an Irish-American labor activist. As the only woman to hold national office within the Knights of Labor, she brought attention to the conditions of working women through her involvement in the labor reform movement. She also furthered the progress of women's rights during the period following the American Civil War and Reconstruction.

== Early life ==
Leonora M. Kearney was born in County Cork, Ireland, to John and Honora Browne Kearney. Leonora's father was an Irish farmer who relocated his family to the rural community of Pierrepont, New York, in 1852 to escape the Great Famine.

In 1864, Leonora's young mother died. Upon her father's remarriage to a woman five years older than her, Leonora decided to attend teaching school. After moving out of the house to escape the tension between herself and her father's new wife, she took the initiative to contact the head of a girls' school in nearby Colton, New York, from whom she received private instruction for six weeks. At the age of sixteen, Leonora received her teacher certificate and, over the following years, taught at a local school.

== Marriage and work ==
Leonora married William E. Barry, a native of Ireland who had emigrated to Canada and then to New York, on 30 November 1871. A painter and musician, he moved with his wife to Potsdam, New York, where the couple had their first child, Marion Frances, in 1873. Even though teachers were in short supply following the Civil War, after her marriage to William Barry she encountered discrimination in her workplace: state law required her to give up her vocation as a teacher because she was now a married woman. This forced her to turn to manual labor. The family moved frequently, including to Haydensville, Massachusetts, and Amsterdam, New York, and she gave birth to two sons, William Standish in 1875 and Charles Joseph in 1880. When her husband died of a lung disease, and her daughter shortly afterward, Barry began to work as a seamstress but found the job too tiring. She then took a job in an Amsterdam hosiery factory where she and her fellow working women faced harsh conditions, long hours, and low pay. She often found herself working upwards of 70 hours a week, and with pay based on output, she made only eleven cents her first day and only 65 cents her first week.

== Knights of Labor and labor activism ==
As a means of taking action against the injustice faced by women in the workforce, Barry joined the local women's branch of the Knights of Labor in 1885, a time when the national organization's membership reached its peak. The Knights of Labor originally served as a secret organization for Philadelphia garment workers but was transformed into an association with the objective of promoting the labor reform movement from a uniform position. Barry, who had been forced into factory labor because of economic necessity, represented the organization's ideal working woman.

Barry's local branch of the Knights held about 1,500 members at this time. She rose within the organization and soon became the master workman, or president, of her local branch. In 1885 she became president of District Assembly 65, which included fifty-two local branches and over nine thousand members. One year later she attended the district convention in Albany and served as one of the district's five delegates to the General Assembly of the Knights of Labor in Richmond, Virginia With the endorsement of the Knights of Labor national leader, Terence V. Powderly, delegates of this convention voted her as head of the recently created Department of Women's Work. (The General Assembly created a committee to gather information on women's conditions in the labor industry, and the findings led to the creation of the Department of Women's Work to be led by a general investigator.) Her duty was to "investigate women’s employment conditions, build new assemblies, agitate for the KOL’s principle of equal pay for equal work, and integrate women into the Knights." She was the first woman to be paid to be a labor investigator and organiser, but also the "only woman to hold national office in the order."

As the primary investigator, Barry dedicated her life to improving wages and working conditions for women throughout the United States, traveling across the nation to investigate female working conditions while also serving as the spokesperson for the female laborers. This complicated her views on traditional female society, for it forced her to leave her children and live in the public sphere. Her reports to the General Assembly in 1887, 1888 and 1889 described the hard conditions in factories, with reports of abuse on women and children. These reports made Barry the first person to collect national statistics on the American working woman. About 65,000 women belonged to the Knights at this time; the organization offered jobs and affordable goods to women while also organizing boycotts in support of female factory laborers’ interests. About four hundred of the Knights’ local branches included women; membership in two-thirds of these was limited to women. Barry, however, found herself unable to build a solid following due to the apathy of working women, divisions within the Knights of Labor, and difficulties faced by a woman attempting to organize men in a male-dominated society. Employers also refused to allow her to investigate their factories. Due to this employer resistance, organizing women within the movement was a challenge, and often better paid workers were reluctant to join labor movements for fear that their conditions would worsen. As Barry remarked, some women had a "habit of submission and acceptance without question of any terms offered them, with the pessimistic view of life in which they see no ray of hope." These factors pushed Barry to support state and federal legislation as a means of protecting laborers. Her efforts in this regard are most visible in the 1889 passage of the first Pennsylvania factory inspection act. Barry, however, would not lobby politicians because she considered such activity "unladylike." Yet of her more than 500 speeches during the course of her career including her popular speech, "The Dignity of Labor," one 4 July speech in 1888 in particular before three thousand people in Rockford, Illinois prompted the local women's assembly to rename the holiday, "Foremothers’ Day."

Barry became enmeshed in the Knights' internal political disputes, and became an opponent of General Secretary John Hayes. In 1888 Hayes took control of the Women's Department and harassed Barry, leading to her resignation in 1890.

== Legacy and later life ==
Whether her efforts were always successful or not, she left an enduring legacy for the women's rights movement. Barry always kept moving forward amidst setbacks, and she willingly made personal sacrifices for the cause in which she believed. After all, "the movement demanded a difficult choice between more traditional feminine concerns and a significant role in public life." Given her self-described goal to liberate "from the remorseless grasp of tyranny and greed the thousands of underpaid women and girls in our large cities, who, suffering the pangs of hunger, cold and privation, ofttimes yield and fall into the yawning chasm of immorality," one can understand the motivation and passion that drove her in her cause.

Barry felt women should not work outside the household except in cases of economic need. Upon her marriage to Obadiah Read Lake in 1890, Barry resigned from her position within the Knights of Labor, bringing an end to the Department of Woman's Work.

At her resignation from the Knights, she seemed to backtrack on her entire mission by stating, "If it were possible, I wish that it were not necessary for women to learn any trade but that of domestic duties, as I believe it was intended that man should be the bread-winner". She went on to qualify her statement by adding, "But as that is impossible under present conditions, I believe women should have every opportunity to become proficient in whatever vocation they choose or find themselves best fitted for." Lake, a trained printer and the proofreader and telegraph editor of the St. Louis Globe-Democrat, resided in St. Louis.

Barry continued to travel and speak on behalf of the woman's suffrage movement and the temperance movement, among other reform movements, after her retirement in St. Louis. She persevered in her pursuit of labor equality for women but in a less organized manner. Barry served primarily as a public speaker on issues of reform, as illustrated by her 1893 speech before the World's Representative Congress of Women at the Columbian exposition in Chicago on "The Dignity of Labor." (Barry never used prepared texts.) She also proved vital to the successful campaign for woman suffrage in Colorado.

In 1916 she moved to Minooka, Illinois, and became active in the Woman's Christian Temperance Union and the Catholic Total Abstinence Union of America while also placing much emphasis on building public support for Prohibition and, later, the Volstead Act. A baseball fan, Barry frequented Chicago to enjoy games. Later in life known as Mother Lake, Barry died on 15 July 1930, of cancer of the mouth.

== Notes ==
=== References ===
- Anonymous (1971). "Barry, Leonora Marie Kearney". Notable American Women, 1607–1950: A Biographical Dictionary. Cambridge, MA: Belknap Press.
- Anonymous (1990). "Barry, Leonora Kearney". Dictionary of American Immigration History. Scarecrow Press. p. 67.
- Anonymous (2002). "Barry, Leonora M.". Women in World History: A Biographical Encyclopaedia. Yorkin Publications. pp. 186–187.
- Arnesen, Eric (2007). Encyclopedia of US Labor and Working-Class History. New York, NY: Routledge.
- Garraty, John A.; Carnes, Mark C. (1999). American National Biography. New York, NY: Oxford University Press.
- Kenneally, James J., "Eve, Mary and the historians: American Catholicism and women." "Horizons" 3, no 2 Fall 1976, p 187-202.
- Levine, Susan (1983). "Labor's true woman: domesticity and equal rights in the Knights of Labor". The Journal of American History. 70 (2): 323–339. doi:10.2307/1900207. JSTOR 1900207.
- Opdycke, Sandra (2000). "Barry, Leonora". American National Biography Online.
- Van Doren, Charles, ed. (1974). Webster's American Biographies. G. & C. Merriam.
- Weir, Robert E. The Nights Unhorsed: Internal Conflict in a Gilded Age Social Movement (2000) pp 141–60.
- Whitman, Alden, ed. (1985). American Reformers. New York, NY: H. W. Wilson.
