= Pea Ridge Masonic College =

Private school in Pea Ridge, Arkansas

- Former names: Pea Ridge Normal College, Pea Ridge Academy, Mount Vernon Normal College
- Type: Private
- Active: 1874–1916
- Affiliations: Methodist, Masonic
- Officer in charge: Reverend Elijah Buttram
- Principal: John Rains Roberts (1874-1894)
- Location: Pea Ridge, Arkansas, United States
- Campus: Rural

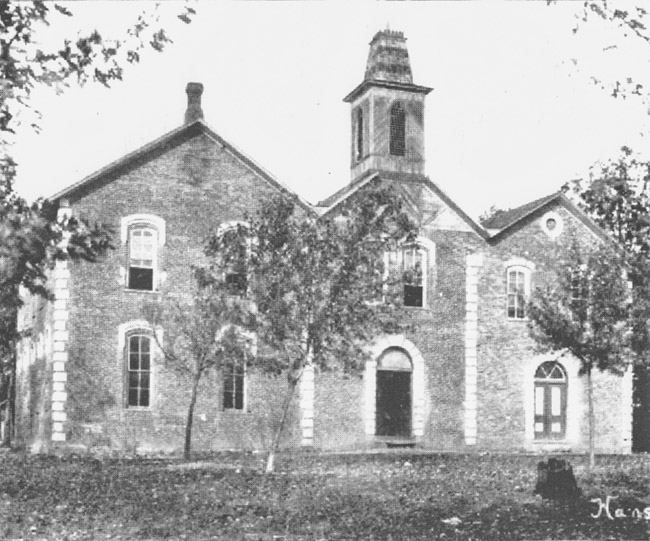
The 1880 Pea Ridge Masonic College building as it appeared in 1920, about ten years before it was razed.

The Pea Ridge Masonic College was a private school located in Pea Ridge, Arkansas that offered a structured education in primary, secondary and collegiate levels. It served primarily as a normal college or teaching school, where students were taught to work as primary and secondary education teachers. It operated from 1874 to 1916, before being absorbed into the town's public primary and secondary schools.

== History ==
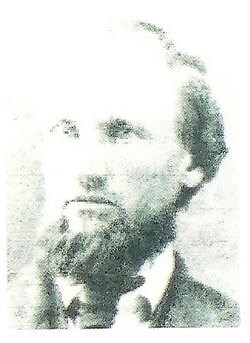
Pea Ridge Academy founder Rev. Elijah Buttram.

The beginning of the Pea Ridge Masonic College, also known as Mount Vernon Normal College, Pea Ridge Academy, Pea Ridge College and Pea Ridge Normal College, dates to 1860, when Rev. Elijah Buttram, a circuit-riding Methodist preacher, founded Buttram's Chapel east of Pea Ridge, the present site of Buttram's Chapel Cemetery. Between 1860 and 1874, educational services at the site were sporadic and led by volunteers and local clergy.

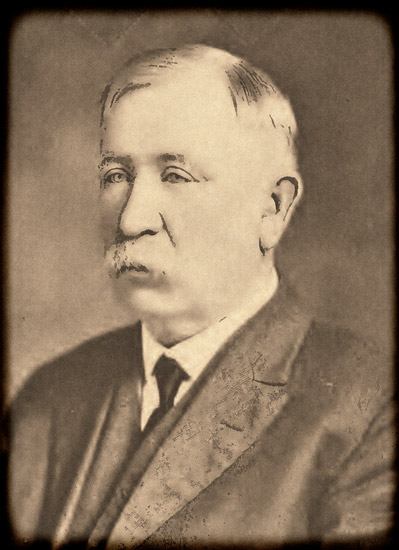
John Rains Roberts, the founding principal at the Pea Ridge Academy. Served from 1874 to 1894.

In 1874, Reverend Elijah Buttram brought in Professor John Rains Roberts as the principal of the newly formalized Pea Ridge Academy. A recent graduate, having received his education at Ozark, Missouri and at Abingdon College in Knox County, Illinois, he saw an opportunity to establish an institution of higher education in the area. In the late 1870s, Roberts and his father purchased a 15-acre tract of land in the town of Pea Ridge, and work began on the new two-story brick schoolhouse, which would become home to the academy. No school was held for the 1879–80 term, as all efforts were focused on completing the new building in Pea Ridge. The academy held its first classes there in the fall of 1880. The school was granted a charter as an academy in 1884 and was also accredited by the University of Arkansas. In 1887–88, the building was enlarged to accommodate 250 pupils.

Pea Ridge had become the educational center not only for the area, but also for aspiring scholars from across county and state lines. In 1884, the Pea Ridge School District #109 was approved as a tax-supported school. The county court had been approached with a petition requesting approval, with Professor Roberts making the presentation of the petition to the court. A board of directors was in charge of the public school grades, while trustees handled affairs for the college, both of which coexisted in the same building.

In 1894, while the college was experiencing some financial issues, Professor Roberts left the college and returned to the Springfield, Missouri, vicinity. After Roberts's departure, a new administration led by B. H. Caldwell reorganized the school as Mount Vernon Normal College, also known as the Pea Ridge Normal College. (The name "Mount Vernon" comes from the Mount Vernon township in which the town of Pea Ridge is located.) Commencement materials from 1895 show that—in addition to the teacher-training programs suggested by the school's new name—music, literature, and other humanities programs were important in the curriculum. Benton County historian J. Dickson Black reports that, in 1902, the college was advertising itself as one of the best business schools in Arkansas.

In 1904, the college went through a second reorganization. Details of the circumstances are sketchy, but it seems a group of nine Masonic lodges teamed together to sponsor the college's operation. The school adopted the new name Mount Vernon Masonic College, although the institution's other names would endure in popular usage through and beyond the active life of the college.

In 1914 Professor Roberts returned to visit the school he had helped found and to take part in the observance of the 40th anniversary of the college. Nancy "Nannie" Roberts, his sister, devoted her long career to teaching younger pupils at Pea Ridge Academy and later in the public school before retiring in 1926. By 1914, the academy was known as the Pea Ridge Masonic College. It operated until 1916, offering elementary, high school, and college-level instruction. In 1916 the college was closed and the property deeded to the Pea Ridge Public School. In 1929, the school district dismantled the college building.

== Former Faculty & Administrators ==
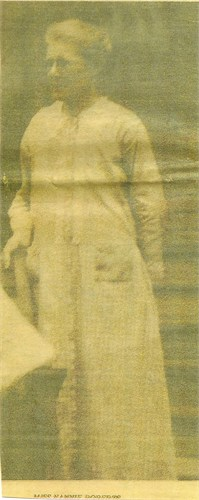
Miss Nancy "Nannie" Roberts, grammar school teacher at the Pea Ridge Academy from 1874 to 1916 and then at Pea Ridge Elementary School from 1916 to 1926.

Reverend Elijah Heneger Buttram - Founder

(Born: October 13, 1832 - Died: September 26, 1916)

Professor John Rains Roberts - Founding Principal 1874-1894 (Born: January 8, 1849 - Died: April 16, 1944)

Benjamin Harvey Caldwell - Principal 1894-After 1901 (Born: January 28, 1870 - Died: August 3, 1906)

Samuel Claiborn Parish - President Circa. 1896-Before 1909 (Born: August 29, 1869 - Died: February 19, 1956)

Dr. C. J. Burton - President Circa 1909-After 1911

Nancy "Nannie" Elizabeth Roberts - Grade School Teacher & Principal 1874-1916 (Born: November 22, 1853 - Died: November 29, 1942)

Charles Collins - Mathematics Circa. 1896 (Born: January 16, 1860 - Died: January 17, 1920)

Marshall H. Fearnow - Natural Sciences Circa 1896 (Born: October 9, 1867 - Died: June 12, 1965)

Ruth Wesler - Piano 1909-Before 1915 (Born: March 25, 1882 - Died: September 25, 1969)

Alma Levitia Keith - English Circa. 1896 (Born: November 21, 1869 - Died: July 7, 1941)

== Today ==
Only a few physical reminders remain of the former Pea Ridge Masonic College. A house, now used for storage, which had served as Professor Roberts home on the campus, and a memorial, built out of bricks of the college's buildings, houses the college's bell on the former school grounds at the northeast corner of the intersection of Curtis and Pickens streets in Pea Ridge's historic downtown.
