= Uriah Smith Stephens =

American labor leader (1821–1882)

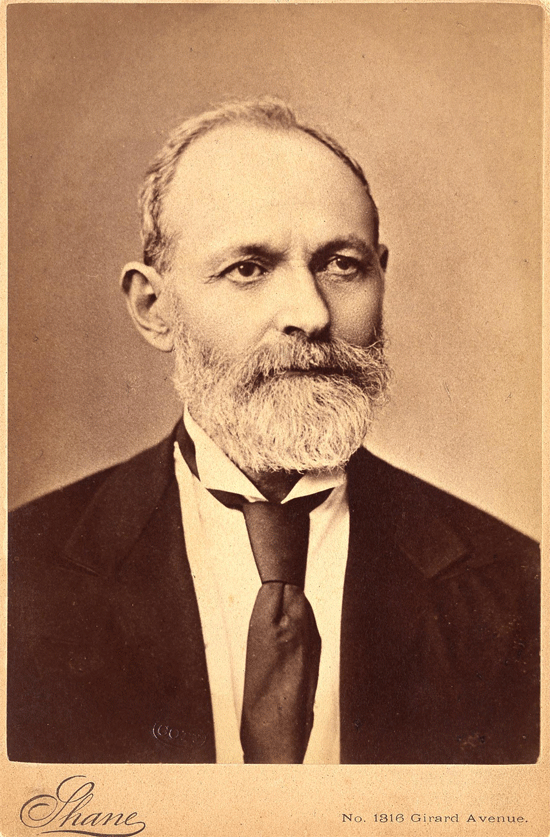
- Born: August 3, 1821; Cape May, New Jersey
- Died: February 13, 1882 (aged 60); Philadelphia, Pennsylvania
- Resting place: Mount Peace Cemetery, Philadelphia
- Occupation: Tailor
- Known for: Founder of the Knights of Labor
- Political party: Greenback Party
- Spouse: Mary A. Stephens
- Children: 4

Uriah Smith Stephens (August 3, 1821 – February 13, 1882) was an American labor leader. He was most notable for his leadership of nine Philadelphia garment workers in founding the Knights of Labor in 1869, a successful early American labor union.

Born in New Jersey, and initially educated for the ministry, Stephens was apprenticed as a tailor when he was a teenager so that he could help support his family. He settled in Philadelphia, where he continued to work at his trade. After extensive travel throughout the western United States, Mexico, and Europe in the late 1840s and early 1850s, he returned to Philadelphia, where he worked as a tailor and became active in fraternal organizations and the labor movement. After an initial effort, the Garment Cutters' Union, failed to take root, in 1869 Stephens founded the Knights of Labor. He originally conceived of the organization as a fraternal one that included secret rituals and focused on individual personal and professional development. As the organization expanded, debates over the need for secrecy and rituals eventually ended when Stephens resigned, and the organization voted to eliminate these requirements, which enabled it to then begin recruiting as members workers and tradesmen who were Catholic.

Stephens remained active in the labor movement after leaving the Knights of Labor, and died in Philadelphia in 1882. The Knights of Labor continued to expand until backlash against unions following the Haymarket affair and the Panic of 1893 caused workers to depart the K of L, and its membership declined until the organization became defunct in 1949. Stephens' primary legacy was as the founder and organizer of one of the first successful nationwide labor unions.

== Early life ==
Stephens was born in Cape May, New Jersey on August 3, 1821. His parents were devout Baptists, and Stephens was educated for the ministry in the hopes that he would become a member of the clergy. The Stephens family sustained financial reverses during the Panic of 1837; Stephens then ended his formal education with the intent of learning a trade. He was trained as a tailor, and worked to help support his family.

== Start of career ==
In 1846, Stephens moved to Philadelphia, where he continued to work as a tailor. From 1853 to 1858, he traveled to California, Mexico, Central America, and several European countries. He returned to Philadelphia, and became active in several reform movements, including the abolition of slavery and utopian socialism.

Throughout his life, Stephens read widely on a variety of topics, including finance and economics. He taught himself several foreign languages including French, German, and Spanish, and practiced them to improve his proficiency, which enabled him to read works by European authors. Stephens also joined several fraternal organizations, including the Masons, Knights of Pythias, and Independent Order of Odd Fellows. He later drew on the symbols and rituals of these organizations when forming the Knights of Labor.

== Labor activist ==
=== Garment Workers' Union ===
In 1862, Stephens helped to organize the Garment Cutters' Union; this organization existed for seven years, but did not have success at obtaining improved pay, benefits and working conditions. As a result, the members voted to disband.

=== Knights of Labor ===
After the demise of the Garment Cutters' Union, a few former members met with Stephens at his home on November 25, 1869. During this gathering, Stephens revealed plans for a new organization, the "Noble and Holy Order of Knights of Labor." As he conceived it, Stephens intended for the Knights of Labor to be a "brotherhood of toil" open to every laborer, mechanic, and artisan who desired professional improvement, regardless of country, creed, or color. At its founding, the K of L was open to all working people, and charged no dues.

The Knights of Labor was intended as a voluntary association of producers, who would work cooperatively and fraternally, as opposed to the self-centered materialism of the Gilded Age. In Stephens’ vision, the K of L included elements of a fraternal organization or secular church, including rituals and secrecy. Secrecy was initially regarded as essential, given the number of incidents of violence against workers, including coal worker strikes in Scranton, Pennsylvania, and the Great Railroad Strike of 1877.

At the new order’s second meeting on December 28, 1869, the group adopted Stephens' ritual work, Adelphon Kruptos (Secret Brotherhood). In it, Stephens expressed his conviction that the "Everlasting Truth sealed by the Grand Architect of the Universe" is that "everything of value, or merit, is the result of creative Industry." Rituals included lectures on the nobility of labor and the evils of wage slavery, monopoly, and over-accumulation of wealth. Stephens created an equilateral triangle within a circle as the new order’s emblem, embellishing it with symbolism from the various lodges to which he belonged.

The Knights of Labor elected Stephens as the first local Master Workman, the first District Master Workman, and the first Grand Master Workman, the highest position in the organization. By 1879, there were 23 district assemblies and 1,300 local assemblies. As the Knights of Labor grew into the most powerful labor organization of its day, Stephens increasingly found himself in disagreement with the rank and file members. The organization's secrecy and rituals became a source of controversy, and many more aggressive members took exception to Stephens’ opposition to strikes and other job actions in favor of promoting the personal and professional development and growth of the organization's members.

In 1878, Stephens ran unsuccessfully for the United States House of Representatives as the candidate of the Greenback–Labor; he had earlier been the catalyst for adding "Labor" to the Greenback Party's name in an attempt to broaden the party's appeal.

=== Resignation ===
Stephens resigned in 1879 over disagreement with a proposed K of L policy shift when the organization's General Assembly voted to make its name public, omit scriptural quotations from the ritual, and edit the initiation ceremonies, all of which were designed to attract new members by making the Knights of Labor less offensive to the Catholic Church. The debate over ending secrecy continued until January 1, 1882, when the Knights of Labor became a public organization. After his resignation, Stephens was replaced by Terence V. Powderly.

Under Powderly's leadership, the Knights of Labor continued to grow; it had almost 700,000 members by 1886, making it the first successful nationwide labor union. The organization also moved further from Stephens' initial vision, including support for the Chinese Exclusion Act. The aftermath of the Haymarket affair and the Panic of 1893 caused workers to start leaving the Knights of Labor, and its membership dwindled until its last local affiliate dropped the name in 1949.

== Death and burial ==
Stephens died in Philadelphia on February 13, 1882. He was buried at Mount Peace Cemetery in Philadelphia.

At the time of his death, Stephens was still active in the labor movement, but estranged from the Knights of Labor. He was still revered by many members, and as a result, in 1886 the K of L General Assembly voted to grant $10,000 to provide a home for Stevens' widow and children.

== Family ==
In 1846, Stephens married Mary Ann Jackson in Philadelphia. They were the parents of four children—Mary E., George W., Ellie, and Carrie P.

== Legacy ==
Stephens' unmarked grave features prominently in the 2007 film Profit Motive and the Whispering Wind, a narration-less documentary in which filmmaker John Gianvito silently displays grave sites and historical locations of American freethinkers and leaders of American Radical political movements.

== Sources ==
=== Books ===
- Beach, Frederick Converse (1907). The Americana: A Universal Reference Library. Vol. XIV. New York, NY: Scientific American.
- Commons, John R. (1921). History of Labour in the United States. Vol. II. New York, NY: The Macmillan Company.
- Kennedy, Stetson (1991). Southern Exposure: Making the South Safe for Democracy. University of Alabama Press: Tuscaloosa, AL. ISBN 978-0-8173-5672-9.
- Kindell, Alexandra; Demers, Elizabeth S. (2014). Encyclopedia of Populism in America: A Historical Encyclopedia. Vol. 1. Santa Barbara, CA: ABC-CLIO. ISBN 978-1-59884-567-9.
- MacDowell, Laurel Sefton; Radforth, Ian Walter (2006). Canadian Working-class History: Selected Readings. Toronto, Canada: Canadian Scholars' Press. ISBN 978-1-55130-298-0.
- Milano, Kenneth W. (2010). Hidden History of Kensington and Fishtown. Charleston, SC: History Press. ISBN 978-1-61423-637-5.
- Painter, Nell Irvin (1987). Standing at Armageddon: The United States, 1877-1919. New York, NY: W. W. Norton & Company. ISBN 978-0-393-30588-3.
- Stephens, Uriah Smith (1886). Knights of Labor Illustrated: Adelphon Kruptos. Chicago, IL: Ezra A. Cook.
- Stevens, Albert C., ed. (1907). The Cyclopædia of Fraternities (2nd ed.). New York City; Paterson, NJ: E. B. Treat and Co. p. 390. LCCN 07036716. OCLC 2570157. OL 6990518M – via HathiTrust.
- Weir, Robert E. (1996). Beyond Labor's Veil: The Culture of the Knights of Labor. University Park, PA: Pennsylvania State University Press. ISBN 978-0-271-01498-2.

=== Magazines ===
- District Assembly 49, Knights of Labor (1895). "Uriah S. Stephens, Founder of the Order of the Knights of Labor". Official Journal of the Thirteenth Annual Convention of the New York Protective Associations. Executive Board, District Assembly 49: New York, NY.

=== Internet ===
- "Pennsylvania and New Jersey Church and Town Records, 1669-1999 Wedding Record for Uriah Smith Stephens and Mary Ann Jackson". Ancestry.com. Provo, UT: Ancestry.com, LLC. October 15, 1846.
- "1880 United States Federal Census, Entry for Uriah S. Stephens Family". Ancestry.com. Provo, UT: Ancestry.com, LLC. 1880.
- "Uriah S. Stephens in the Philadelphia, Pennsylvania, Death Certificates Index, 1803-1915". Ancestry.com. Provo, UT: Ancestry.com, LLC. 1882.

=== Newspapers ===
- Sand, James (December 21, 1935). "Losing Their Chains: Two Knights Without a Single Cause - U.S. Stephens and T.V. Powderly" (PDF). Workers Age. New York, NY.
- Feeney, Mark (November 29, 2007). "A hushed, hypnotic history". Boston Globe. Boston, MA.

Trade union offices
Preceded by Union founded	Grand Master Workman of the Knights of Labor (District 1); 1869–1872	Succeeded by Robert Calvin Macauley
Preceded by National organization established	Grand Master Workman of the Knights of Labor; 1878–1879	Succeeded by Terence V. Powderly
