= Simon Burns (unionist) =

Simon Burns (1854 – 1910) was an American labor union leader.

Born in Illinois, Burns worked making window glass, and joined the Knights of Labor. He moved to Pittsburgh in 1895, to take up a post as president of the Window Glass Workers' local. Late in 1900, he was elected as general master workman, the leader of the Knights of Labor. However, when re-elected in 1901 Burns objected to the make-up of the executive council, and claimed that he had the right to appoint alternative members. The union's assembly held a new election, and instead voted in Henry A. Hicks as leader of the union.

Burns joined a rival faction of the Knights of Labor, led by John N. Parsons. Although much smaller than the majority federation, the two engaged in lengthy court cases over the rights to the name and resources of the federation. Burns was elected as general master workman of the minority faction in 1902, and served until his death in 1910.

Trade union offices
Preceded by Isaac D. Chamberlain	General Master Workman of the Knights of Labor; 1900–1901	Succeeded by Henry A. Hicks
Preceded by John N. Parsons	General Master Workman of the Knights of Labor (minority faction); 1902–1910	Succeeded by Thomas H. Canning
