= James Sovereign =

American labor unionist

Sovereign, in 1894

James Richard Sovereign (May 1854 – December 16, 1928) was an American labor unionist.

Born in Grant County, Wisconsin, Sovereign grew up in Illinois, where his family farmed. He worked as a cattle rancher, then in bridge and tunnel construction, before in 1874 becoming a marble cutter, settling in Iowa. In 1881, he joined the Knights of Labor (KoL), in which he soon became prominent as a lecturer and journalist.

In 1890, Sovereign was elected as the Iowa Commissioner of Labor Statistics, and he was soon elected by the state's KoL assembly to serve on the national General Assembly. In 1893, national leader of the union, General Master Workman Terence V. Powderly, was vote out of office. Sovereign won the post, with the support of two key factions: populists based in the mid west, and socialists led by Daniel De Leon. However, the union was in decline. Sovereign promised to make the socialist Lucien Sanial editor of the union's newspaper, but when he did not follow through on this, De Leon's supporters withdrew en masse. In 1895, Sovereign reintroduced many secret society elements of the union which had been removed by his predecessor, and this prompted many Catholic members to leave the union. He also suspended two important locals: the coal miners' number 135, and the glassblowers' number 300.

In 1894, to supplement his income, Sovereign moved to Sulphur Springs, Arkansas, where he became a fruit farmer. While leading the KoL, he was elected to the executive of the People's Party, and he helped run the party's campaign headquarters during the 1896 United States presidential election.

Sovereign stood down as General Master Workman in 1897. The following year, he began working for the Western Federation of Miners, as editor of its official newspaper, the Idaho State Tribune. He left the post in 1899, and moved to Spokane, Washington, to manage a mine. There, he joined a local affiliate of the American Federation of Labor, and served terms as both its secretary and president. He later moved to Ferry County, Washington, where he published a newspaper.

Trade union offices
Preceded by Terence V. Powderly	General Master Workman of the Knights of Labor; 1893–1897	Succeeded by Henry A. Hicks
