= John N. Parsons =

John N. Parsons (1856 – 1930) was an American labor union leader.

Born in New York City, Parsons worked as a machinist, then a rock driller, before in 1889 becoming a letter carrier. He joined the New York Letter Carriers' Association, an affiliate of the Knights of Labor, and became its master workman in 1893.

In 1890, Parsons was a founder member of the National Association of Letter Carriers (NALC), becoming president of his local in 1894, and in 1896 winning election as president of the national union. In 1898, he was additionally elected as General Master Workman, the national leader of the Knights of Labor. He defeated incumbent Henry A. Hicks, who had the support of the federation's secretary-treasurer, John Hayes.

By 1900, Parsons and Hayes were unable to work together. Hayes alleged that Parsons was not completing work, and had not called meetings of the executive board. Parsons obtained an injunction barring Hayes from handling money or mail for the union, but Hayes obtained a counter-injunction which gave him control of the union's apparatus. Parsons set up a rival KoL organization, but it was much smaller than Hayes' version, and Parsons soon passed its leadership on to Simon Burns.

A supporter of the Republican Party, Parsons was appointed by Theodore Roosevelt as a special inspector of post offices, then worked for the customs service of the United States Post Office. In 1905, he was appointed as the postmaster of Yonkers, New York. He backed a rival slate of candidates for various civic posts that year, but all were defeated in the primaries.

Parsons lost his postmaster position in 1910, when William Howard Taft appointed his own candidate. However, Taft did sign an executive action to secure Parson's reappointment as a letter carrier, bypassing civil service rules. Parsons was re-appointed as postmaster in Yonkers in 1914, and then from 1919 served as superintendent of the motor vehicle service of the New York City post office. He died in 1930.

Trade union offices
Preceded by R. F. Quinn	President of the National Association of Letter Carriers; 1896–1901	Succeeded by James C. Keller
Preceded by Henry A. Hicks	General Master Workman of the Knights of Labor; 1898–1900	Succeeded by Isaac D. Chamberlain
Preceded by Federation split	General Master Workman of the Knights of Labor (minority faction); 1900–1902	Succeeded by Simon Burns
