= Charles Litchman =

American politician and labor unionist

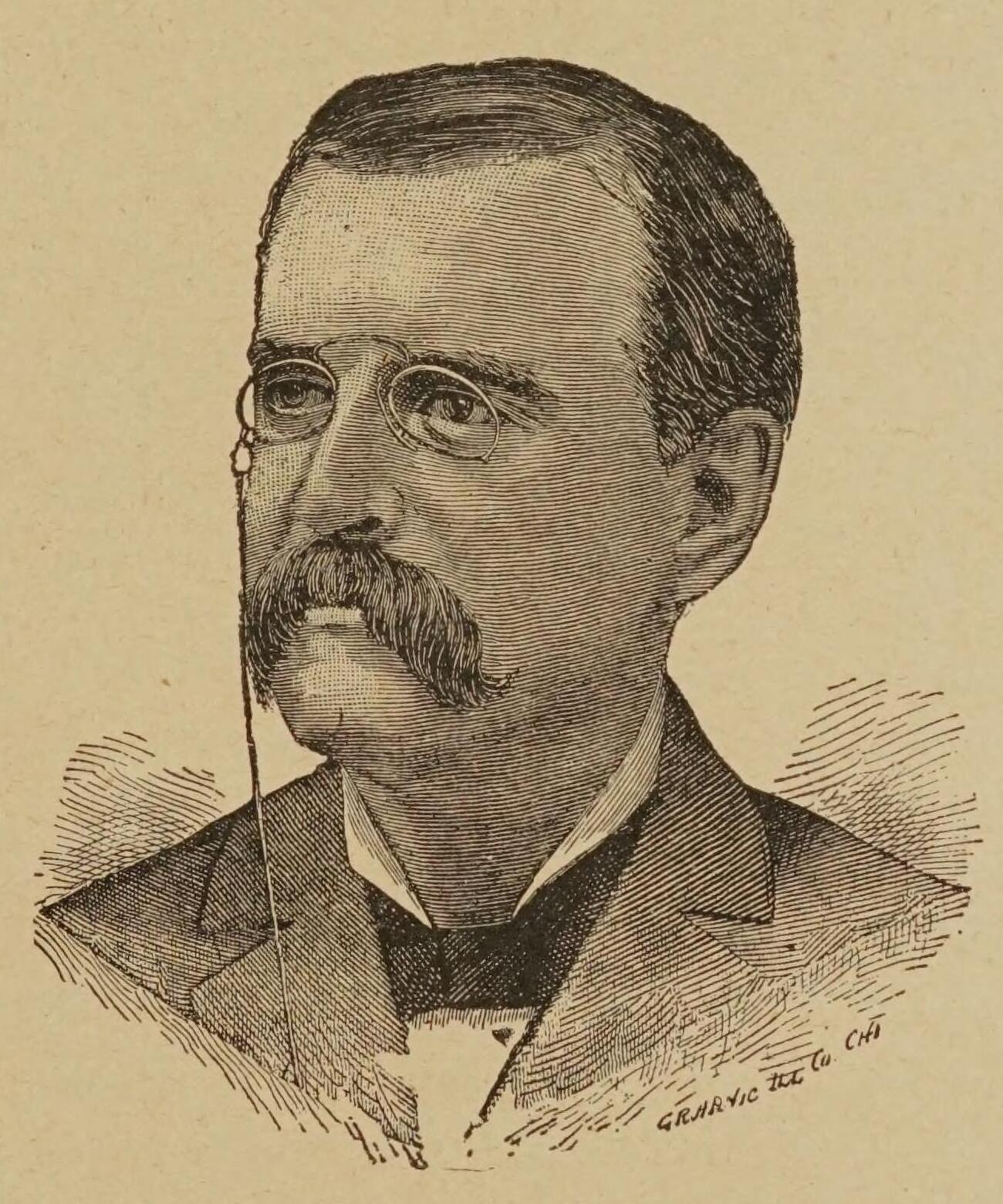
Engraving of Litchman published 1891

Charles Henry Litchman (April 8, 1849 – June 21, 1902) was an American politician and labor unionist.

== Biography ==
Born in Marblehead, Massachusetts, Litchman attended Marblehead Academy, then became a shoe salesman for his father's company. He then founded a shoe factory with his brother, and in his spare time, studied the law. During the recession of 1873, he lost the factory and gave up studying the law, becoming a shoemaker. Also in 1873, he was elected to the Marblehead School Committee, serving a three-year term.

Litchman joined the Knights of St. Crispin, and from 1875 to 1878, he served as grand scribe of its grand lodge. He also joined the Knights of Labor, becoming head of its Massachusetts District Assembly, and in 1878 was elected as the national union's grand secretary. He served until 1881.

Litchman stood for the Massachusetts Legislature for the Republican Party unsuccessfully. He then joined the Greenback Party, for which he won the election in 1878. He lost his seat the following year.

In 1886, Litchman was elected to the renamed post of general secretary of the Knights of Labor. He resigned in 1888, to work on the presidential campaign of Benjamin Harrison. After the election, he was appointed as a special agent in the United States Department of the Treasury, serving until 1893, and then from 1900 served on the Industrial Commission. He died in 1902.

Trade union offices
Preceded by New position	Grand Secretary of the Knights of Labor; 1878–1881	Succeeded by Robert D. Layton
Preceded by Frederick Turner	General Secretary of the Knights of Labor; 1886–1888	Succeeded by John Hayes
