= Henry A. Hicks =

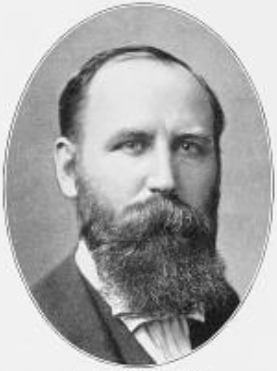
- Born: 1855 or 1856
- Died: August 27, 1927; Hackensack, New Jersey, US
- Occupations: Labor leader, activist, builder
- Political party: Democratic

Henry A. Hicks (1855 or 1856 – August 27, 1927) was an American labor union leader and political activist.

== Biography ==
Born in the United States, Hicks became a stair builder. He joined the Knights of Labor in the early 1880s, and was leader of the Stair Builders' Union. From 1890, he was leader of Building Constructors' local of the Knights, number 253.

In 1892, Hicks was elected as chairman of the New York State People's Party, and was the party's candidate for Mayor of New York. He took last place in the poll, with about 2,500 votes.

In 1897, Hicks was elected as General Master Workman of the Knights of Labor, the most senior position in the union. At the time, the union's executive was divided into three factions, and Hicks was the nominee of the faction led by John Hayes. The New York Times speculated that Hayes believed that he could control Hicks. In 1898, Hicks was defeated for re-election by John N. Parsons. His supporters alleged that this was simply a personal matter, while his opponents argued that Parsons was a superior organizer and speaker.

In 1901, the union elected Simon Burns as General Master Workman. However, Burns objected to the make-up of the executive council, and claimed that he had the right to appoint alternative members. The union's assembly held a new election, and voted Hicks back in as leader of the union. By this time, Hicks had fallen out with Hayes. In 1902, Hayes won a legal case giving him effective control of the union. Hicks sided with Burns, and the two formed a rival Knights of Labor group, with Hicks as General Worthy Foreman, second in command.

In later years, Hicks moved to Hasbrouck Heights, New Jersey, where worked as a builder and architect, and was active in the Democratic Party in Bergen County, New Jersey. He died at his home in Hackensack on August 27, 1927, at age 71.

Trade union offices
Preceded by James Sovereign	General Master Workman of the Knights of Labor; 1897–1898	Succeeded by John N. Parsons
Preceded by Simon Burns	General Master Workman of the Knights of Labor; 1901–1902	Succeeded by John Hayes
