= Ralph Beaumont (unionist) =

Ralph Beaumont (born April 7, 1844) was an English-born American labor union leader.

Born in Holmfirth in England, Beaumont emigrated with his parents to the United States when he was four years old, settling in Dudley, Massachusetts. He began working as a shoemaker when he was about 10 years old, completing an apprenticeship. During the American Civil War, he served with the 7th Rhode Island Infantry Regiment.

After the war, Beaumont moved to Utica, New York, where he returned to shoemaking. He joined the Knights of St. Crispin, an early union, then became active in the Knights of Labor. He served as General Worthy Foreman of the Knights of Labor, the union's second-in-command, from 1878 to 1879, and again from 1882 to 1883. In 1884, he announced that he would tour the country on foot, starting in Bangor, Maine, and ending in California.

Beaumont supported the Greenback Party, for which he stood unsuccessfully for the New York State Senate in 1877, and for the United States Congress in 1878. In 1880, he became the labor correspondent of the Elmira Sunday Telegram, the first of several posts in journalism. In the late 1880s, he served as chair of the Knights of Labor's National Legislative Committee. He became the chair of the National Citizens' Alliance in 1890, and worked as a lecturer for the Knights in the 1890s. By 1902, he was an immigrant inspector based a St John, New Brunswick.

Trade union offices
Preceded by New position	Grand Worthy Foreman of the Knights of Labor; 1878–1879	Succeeded by Terence V. Powderly
Preceded by Richard Griffiths	Grand Worthy Foreman of the Knights of Labor; 1882–1883	Succeeded by Henry A. Coffeen
