= Isaac D. Chamberlain =

American labour unionist (1840–1918)

Isaac Dearborn Chamberlain (October 20, 1840 – July 1918) was an American labor unionist.

Born in Fredericktown, Ohio, Chamberlain's father, Uriah, was an anti-slavery activist and a founder of Oberlin College. Isaac served with the 18th Pennsylvania Cavalry Regiment during the American Civil War, while also working as a correspondent for newspapers including the Erie Gazette and The Cleveland Leader. After the war, he became a schoolteacher, then moved to Colorado, to become an editor and publisher.

Chamberlain joined the Knights of Labor, and in 1897, he was elected as General Worthy Foreman of the union, the second-most senior position. In 1898, he opposed the American occupation of Cuba, and also the idea of a large standing army, which he feared would be used against striking workers.

In 1900, there was a dispute between the leader of the union, General Master Workman John N. Parsons, and its secretary-treasurer, John Hayes, with courts ruling in Hayes' favor. Chamberlain took no part in the dispute, but on May 26, 1900, he invited both parties to a meeting of the union's executive. Parsons did not attend, and the executive voted to expel him from the union, with Chamberlain becoming General Master Workman. He served until the union's annual general assembly, in November. In 1902, he was instead elected as secretary-treasurer, also serving as editor of the union's newspaper. He held this post until the union was dissolved, in 1917, dying the following year.

Chamberlain was also a freemason, a member of the Grand Army of the Republic, and a Christian Scientist.

Trade union offices
Preceded by Thomas McGuire	General Worthy Foreman of the Knights of Labor; 1897–1900	Succeeded by Arthur McConnell
Preceded by John N. Parsons	General Master Workman of the Knights of Labor; 1900	Succeeded by Simon Burns
Preceded by John Hayes	Secretary-Treasurer of the Knights of Labor; 1902–1917	Succeeded by Union dissolved
