= Henry A. Coffeen =

American politician (1841–1912)

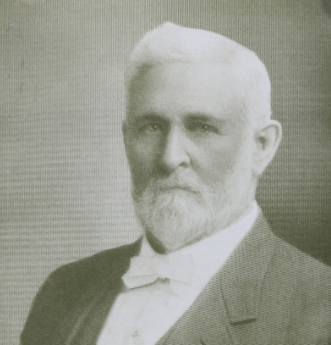

Member of the U.S. House of Representatives from Wyoming's at-large district
- In office March 4, 1893 – March 3, 1895
- Preceded by: Clarence D. Clark
- Succeeded by: Frank W. Mondell

Personal details
- Born: Henry Asa Coffeen; February 14, 1841 Gallipolis, Ohio, U.S.
- Died: December 9, 1912 (aged 71) Sheridan, Wyoming, U.S.
- Resting place: Sheridan Municipal Cemetery
- Party: Democratic
- Spouse(s): Harriet King; Alice Dwight
- Children: 3
- Parents: Alvah P. Coffeen (father); Olive Elizabeth Martin (mother)
- Education: Abingdon College

Henry Asa Coffeen (February 14, 1841 – December 9, 1912) was an American politician who served as Wyoming's United States Representative as a Democrat.

== Life ==
Henry Asa Coffeen was born on February 14, 1841, in Gallipolis, Ohio to Alvah P. Coffeen and Olive Elizabeth Martin and his family later moved to Indiana and then to Homer, Illinois in 1853. He attended the country schools and was graduated from the scientific department of Abingdon College. He engaged in teaching and was a member of the faculty of Hiram College in Ohio. He moved to Sheridan in the Wyoming Territory in 1884; he was a delegate from Wyoming to the World's Fair Congress of Bankers and Financiers at Chicago in June 1893. In 1889 he was selected as one of the Democratic delegates to the Wyoming constitutional convention to draft its constitution to be submitted for statehood.

In 1885 he organized the first agricultural fair in Wyoming. In 1892 Coffeen narrowly defeated Clarence D. Clark and was elected to the United States House, but was defeated in a landslide by Frank Wheeler Mondell in 1894.

His first wife, Harriet King, died on June 4, 1901, and he remarried to Alice Dwight on June 28, 1904. On December 9, 1912, he died in Sheridan, Wyoming.

== Electoral history ==
1892 Wyoming at-large Congressional District election
Party	Candidate	Votes	%	±%
Democratic	Henry A. Coffeen	8,855	51.34%	+9.56%
Republican	Clarence D. Clark (incumbent)	8,394	48.66%	−9.56%
Total votes		17,249	100.00%	

1894 Wyoming at-large Congressional District election
Party	Candidate	Votes	%	±%
Republican	Frank Wheeler Mondell	10,068	52.64%	+3.98%
Democratic	Henry A. Coffeen (incumbent)	6,152	32.17%	−19.17%
Populist	Shakespeare E. Sealey	2,906	15.19%	+15.19%
Total votes		19,126	100.00%	

Trade union offices
Preceded by Ralph Beaumont	Grand Worthy Foreman of the Knights of Labor; 1883–1884	Succeeded by Richard Griffiths
U.S. House of Representatives
Preceded by Clarence D. Clark	Member of the U.S. House of Representatives from Wyoming's at-large congressional district March 4, 1893 – March 3, 1895	Succeeded by Frank W. Mondell
