= Abingdon College =

Former private college in Abingdon, Illinois

Abingdon College was a college in Abingdon, Illinois affiliated with the Christian Church (Disciples of Christ). It opened in 1853 and was consolidated with Eureka College, another Christian Church college, in the 1880s.

== History ==
Abingdon College was founded by P. H. Murphy and J. C. Reynolds, and opened on the first Monday of April in 1853. It received a charter from the state of Illinois in February 1855. Between 1875 and 1877, however, a quarrel between groups involved in the college effectively closed it. F. M. Bruner bought the college in 1880, but in 1885, it merged with Eureka College, and the Abingdon campus closed in 1888.

After consolidating with Eureka College and closing, the remnants of Abingdon College were bought by a professor named Summers, who named the facility Abingdon College Normal, but this college quickly failed as well. After this, another college in Abingdon, Hedding College, which had been founded about two years after Abingdon College, bought the property in 1895 and used the buildings as their music and normal school campus.

== Student life ==
The college had chapters of Phi Sigma and Delta Tau Delta fraternities.
