= Knights of Labor =

US-based labor federation

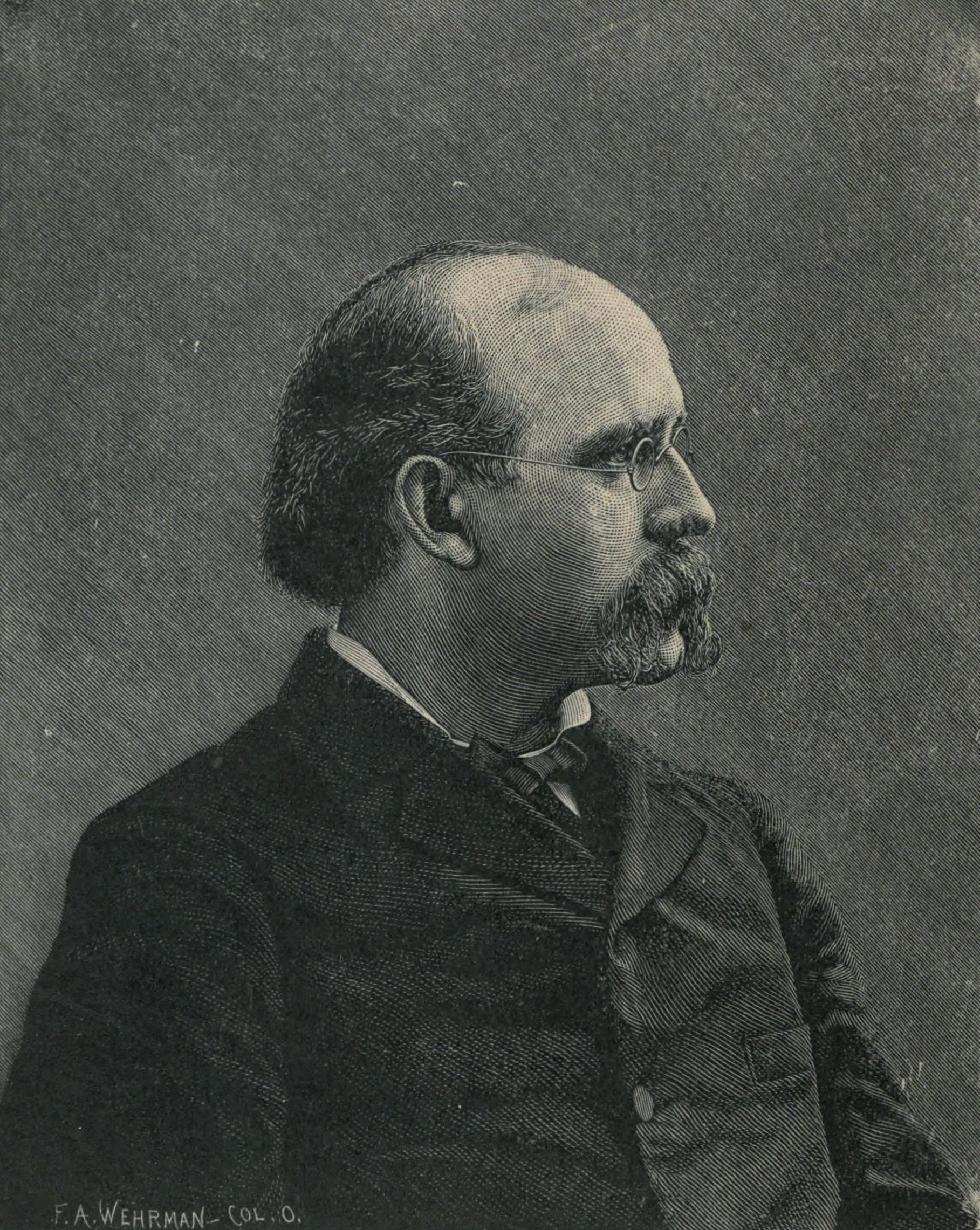
Terence Powderly, Grand Master Workman of the Knights of Labor during its meteoric rise and precipitous decline (1890)

The Knights of Labor (K of L), officially the Noble and Holy Order of the Knights of Labor, was the largest American labor movement of the 19th century, for a time claiming nearly one million members. It operated mainly in the United States and Canada, and also had chapters in Great Britain and Australia. Terence V. Powderly was one of its most notable leaders, heading the organization during both its rapid rise and decline. The Knights of Labor promoted the social and cultural uplift of the worker, and demanded the eight-hour day. In some cases it acted as a labor union, negotiating with employers, but it was never well organized or funded. It was notable in its ambition to organize across lines of gender and race and in the inclusion of both skilled and unskilled labor. It grouped all workers, regardless of occupation, into a single body. After a rapid expansion in the mid-1880s, it suddenly lost its new members and succumbed to a jurisdictional battle with the new American Federation of Labor. The Knights of Labor had served as the first mass organization of the working class in the United States.

Founded by Uriah Stephens on 28 December 1869, the Knights of Labor reached 28,000 members in 1880, and 100,000 in 1884. By 1886, it had nearly 800,000 members: 20% of all workers. Its frail organizational structure could not cope as charges of failure, violence, allegations, and backlash following the 1886 Haymarket Square riot battered it. Most members abandoned the movement in 1886–1887, leaving at most 100,000 members in 1890. Many opted to join groups that helped to identify their specific needs instead of the KOL which addressed many different types of issues. The Panic of 1893, the largest economic depression in US history at the time, ended the Knights of Labor's importance. While their national headquarters closed in 1917, remnants of the Knights of Labor survived until 1949, when the group's last 50-member local dropped its affiliation.

== Origins ==
In 1869, Uriah Smith Stephens, James L. Wright, and a small group of Philadelphia tailors founded a secret organization known as the Noble Order of the Knights of Labor. The collapse of the National Labor Union in 1873 left a vacuum for workers looking for organization. The Knights became better organized with a national vision when, in 1879, they replaced Stephens with Terence V. Powderly, who was just 30 years old at the time. The body became popular with trade unions and Pennsylvania coal miners during the economic depression of the mid-1870s, then it grew rapidly. The KOL was a diverse industrial union open to all workers. The leaders felt that it was best to have a versatile population in order to get points of view from all aspects. The Knights of Labor barred five groups from membership: bankers, land speculators, lawyers, liquor dealers and gamblers. Its members included low skilled workers, railroad workers, immigrants, and steel workers. This helped the workers to get an organizational identity. As one of the largest labor organizations in the nineteenth century, Knights wanted to classify the workers, as it was a time when large scale factories and industries were rapidly growing. Even though skilled workers were prioritized at the beginning 1880s, by the time of 1886, nearly a million workers were enrolled.

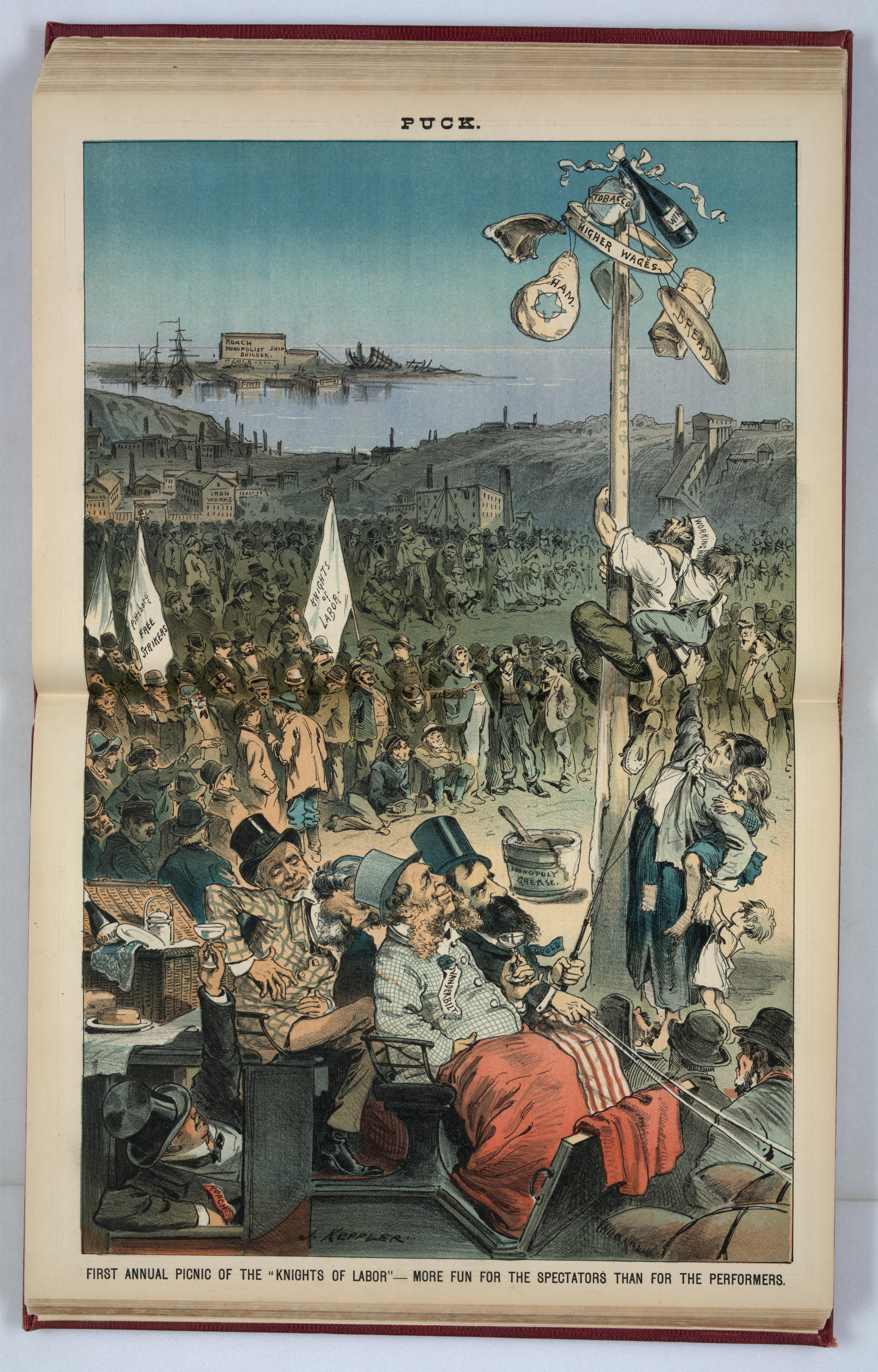
Puck magazine cartoon satirizing the first annual picnic of the "Knights of Labor"

As membership expanded, the Knights began to function more as a labor union and less as a secret organization. During the 1880s, the Knights of Labor played a massive role in independent and third-party movements. Local assemblies began to emphasize cooperative enterprises and initiate strikes to win concessions from employers. The Knights of Labor brought together workers of different religions, races, and genders and helped them all create a bond and unify all for the same cause. The new leader, Powderly, opposed strikes as a "relic of barbarism", but the size and the diversity of the Knights afforded local assemblies a great deal of autonomy.

In 1882, the Knights ended their membership rituals and removed the words "Noble Order" from their name. This was intended to mollify the concerns of Catholic members and the bishops who wanted to avoid any resemblance to freemasonry. Though initially averse to strikes to advance their goals, the Knights did aid various strikes and boycotts. The Wabash Railroad strike in 1885 became successful thanks to the support of the railroad brotherhoods and communities along the railroad. The railroad communities were also able to successfully strike against one of the railroad financiers, Jay Gould. The strike included stopping track, yard, engine maintenance, the control or sabotage of equipment, and the occupation of shops and roundhouses. Gould met with Powderly and told him any strike that is against the Texas and Pacific would be considered as a contest between his order and the laws of land. This gave momentum to the Knights and membership surged. By 1886, the Knights had more than 700,000 members.

The Knights' primary demand was for the eight-hour workday. They also called for legislation to end child and convict labor as well as a graduated income tax. They also supported cooperatives. The only woman to hold office in the Knights of Labor, Leonora Barry, worked as an investigator. She described the horrific conditions in factories employing women and children. These reports made Barry the first person to collect national statistics on the American working woman. In 1887, 65,000 women joined the labor movement, which represented about 10 percent of the Knights' total membership.

Powderly and the Knights tried to avoid divisive political issues, but in the early 1880s, many Knights had become followers of Henry George's ideology known now as Georgism. In 1883, Powderly officially recommended George's book and announced his support of "single tax" on land values. During the New York mayoral election of 1886, Powderly was able to successfully push the organization towards the favor of Henry George. In 1886, the Knights became of the part of the short lived United Labor Party, an alliance of labor organizations formed in support of George's campaign in the 1886 New York City mayoral election.

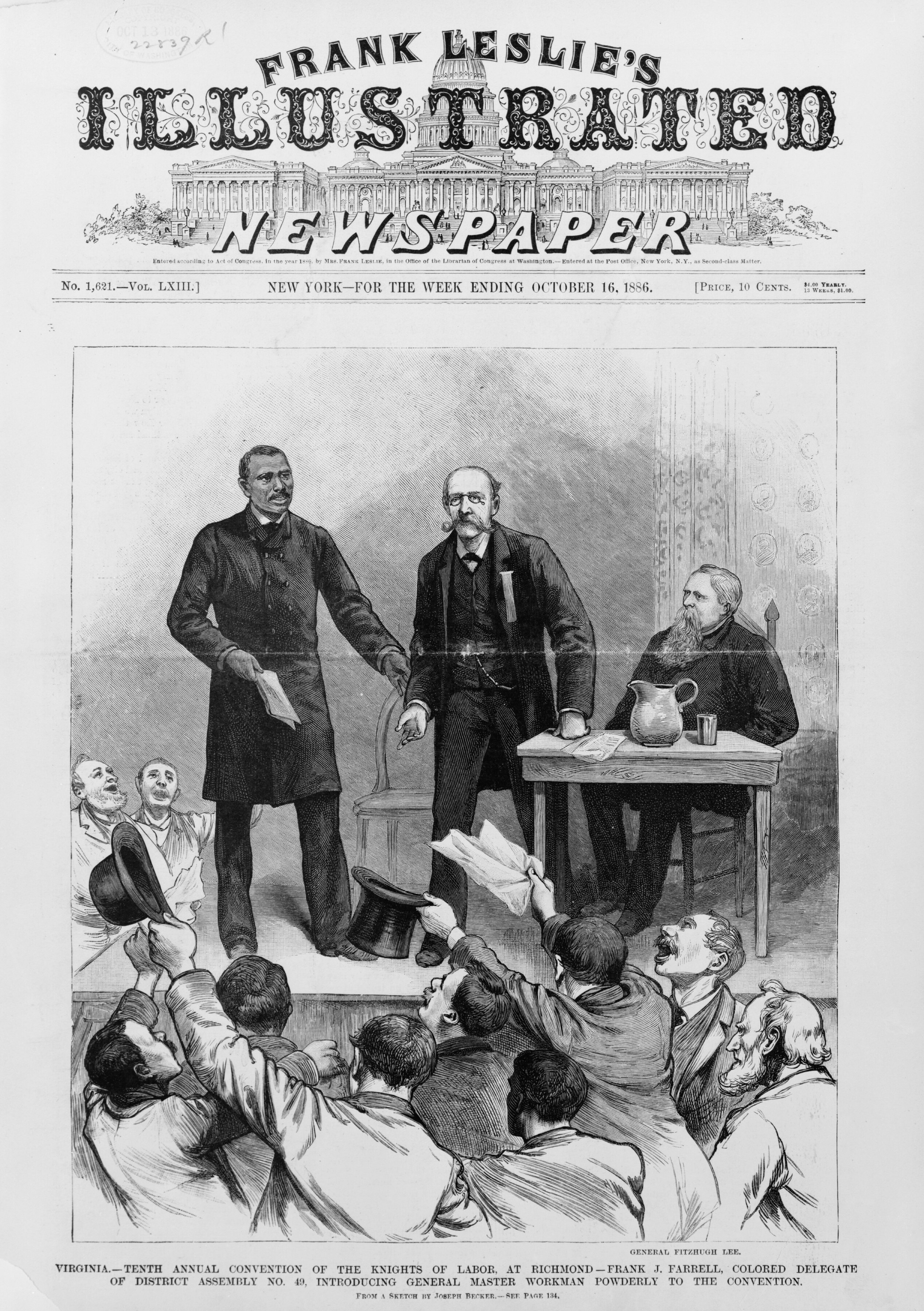
A depiction of Terence V. Powderly being introduced to the tenth annual convention of the Knights of Labor in Richmond, Virginia by an African American delegate, Frank J. Farrell, on the front page of Frank Leslie's Illustrated Newspaper, October 16, 1886

The Knights of Labor helped to bring together many different types of people from all walks of life; for example, Catholic and Protestant Irish-born workers. The KOL appealed to them because they worked very closely with the Irish Land League. The Knights had a mixed record on inclusiveness and exclusiveness. They accepted women and African Americans (after 1878) and their employers as members and advocated the admission of blacks into local assemblies. However, the organization tolerated the segregation of assemblies in the South. Bankers, doctors, lawyers, stockholders, and liquor manufacturers were excluded because they were considered unproductive members of society. Asians were also excluded, and in November 1885, a branch of the Knights in Tacoma, Washington violently expelled the city's Chinese workers, who amounted to nearly a tenth of the overall city population at the time. Black membership stood at 60,000 in 1886, and there were 400 all-black locals, primarily in the south.

The Union Pacific Railroad came into conflict with the Knights. When the Knights in Wyoming refused to work more hours in 1885, the railroad hired Chinese workers as strikebreakers and to stir up racial animosity. The result was the Rock Springs massacre, that killed scores of Chinese workers, and drove the rest out of Wyoming. About 50 African-American sugar-cane laborers organized by the Knights went on strike and were murdered by strikebreakers in the 1887 Thibodaux massacre in Louisiana. The Knights strongly supported passage of the Chinese Exclusion Act of 1882 and the Contract Labor Law of 1885, as did many other labor groups, demonstrating the limits of their commitment to solidarity. While they claimed to not be "against immigration", their anti-Asian racism demonstrated the limits and inconsistency of their anti-racist platform.

== Geography ==
Nearly 12,000 Knights Assemblies (11,957) have been identified and mapped by historian Jonathan Garland. They were located in more than 5,600 cities and towns across every state and territory of the United States, with others in Canada, Great Britain, and Australia. In the peak year, 1886, the Knights reported 729,677 members in 5,892 Local Assemblies. But Garland explains that "this was actually an undercount. The organization had trouble keeping track of local assemblies and membership in the midst of this growth period." The actual membership approached one million.

In the first decade, 1869–1879, the organization was concentrated in coal mining towns in Pennsylvania, Ohio, West Virginia, and Illinois. But in the early 1880s, craft assemblies and mixed assemblies appeared in big cities and small towns across the Midwest, then after 1885 the movement surged into the South and through the mining and railroad towns of the West.

== Demands ==
The Knights aimed to educate and uplift workers and negotiate salaries and contracts with employers. The Knights had a few primary demands that they wanted to see established. For one, they wanted the workers to see a proper share of the wealth that they created; in other words, they tried to diminish or at least decrease the wage gap. They wanted to educate workers, create cooperative institutions, and enact labor laws such as child labor laws. The Knights also wanted to make sure that workers were protected and that their workplace was improved. The 8-hour workday was something that became very important to the Knights.

== Movements in Arkansas ==
In 1882 the Knights of Labor made their way into Arkansas, and by 1887 they gained over 5000 members. There were two main strikes that took place in Arkansas, the Great Southwest Railroad Strike, which took place across the whole country, and a strike that took place on a Plantation in Pulaski County, near Little Rock. The strike began from forty farmhands demanding higher wages, and living conditions. Ultimately the strike was not successful, but it sparked a tradition of protests across the state. After the failed strike the Knights of Labor worked closely with agricultural organizations to try and push for political change.

== Decline ==
J. R. Sovereign, Grand Master Workman of the Knights of Labor from 1893 to 1897

The Knights of Labor's meteoric rise in membership was quickly followed by a sharp decline. While there are various reasons for this decline, there are three main things it can be attributed to. First, the Knights of Labor was too broad and altruistic. Many of the new members joined the Knights expecting their own interests to be addressed. The organization's declaration that "an injury to one is the concern of all" was too widespread for a majority of members, especially those who joined for more concrete reasons. Second, the Knights of Labor did not have enough funds to sustain movement. Initiation fees and membership dues for the organization were very low. This practice led to insufficient funds for strikes and member benefits. Third, the leadership of the Knights often ignored, and sometimes worked against, the interests of their members. Much of this disconnect stemmed from Grand Master Workman of the Order Terence V. Powderly. He ordered 20,000 meat packers stop their strike even though they were nearing victory and also stated that he had "more friends outside the labor organizations than in them." Furthermore, any smaller Knights of Labor chapter or labor paper that dared to criticize the Order's leadership would face the might of the Order. They expelled thousands of members from the Knights and called for boycotts of critical papers. All together these factors led to members losing faith in and subsequently leaving the organization. In addition to these, there were smaller events and tensions that weakened the Knights, namely: the Great Southwest railroad strike of 1886, tensions between skilled and unskilled workers, and disapproval of the Catholic Church.

=== Southwest railroad strike of 1886 ===
The Great Southwest railroad strike of 1886 was a Knights strike involving more than 200,000 workers. Beginning on 1 March 1886, railroad workers in five states struck against the Union Pacific and Missouri Pacific railroads, owned by Jay Gould. At least ten people were killed. The unravelling of the strike within two months led directly to the collapse of the Knights of Labor and the formation of the American Federation of Labor.

In 1886, following their peak, they started to lose more members to the American Federation of Labor. The Knights of Labor's fall is believed to have been due to their lack of adaptability and beliefs in old-style industrial capitalism. Another large reason for their decline was the tension between skilled craftsmen and unskilled workers.

=== Unskilled vs. Skilled Workers ===
Scholars pit the skilled and unskilled workers as another reason for the Knights of Labor's downfall. The Union worked for both groups, but since the results of the union efforts often benefited one or the other and not both, the tension persisted. Unskilled workers often benefited from equal opportunities. Skilled workers would become upset when someone took their jobs with less skill. Skilled workers benefit from better pay, but many unskilled workers do not receive those benefits. This tension discouraged new members and led existing ones to leave the Knights of Labor and ultimately caused many members to leave.

=== Catholic Church ===
The Knights of Labor attracted many Catholics, who were a large part of the membership, perhaps a majority. Powderly was also a Catholic. However, the Knights' use of secrecy, similar to the Masons, during its early years concerned many bishops of the Church. The Knights used secrecy and deception to help prevent employers from firing members.

After the Archbishop of Quebec condemned the Knights in 1884, twelve American archbishops voted 10 to 2 against doing likewise in the United States. Furthermore, Cardinal James Gibbons and Bishop John Ireland defended the Knights. Gibbons went to the Vatican to talk to the hierarchy.

== Legacy ==
=== Labor Protest Songs ===
Though often overlooked, the Knights of Labor contributed to the tradition of labor protest songs in America. The Knights frequently included music in their regular meetings, and encouraged local members to write and perform their work. In Chicago, James and Emily Talmadge, printers and supporters of the Knights of Labor, published the songbook "Labor Songs Dedicated to the Knights of Labor" (1885). The song "Hold the Fort" [also "Storm the Fort"], a Knights of Labor pro-labor revision of the hymn by the same name, became the most popular labor song prior to Ralph Chaplin's IWW (Industrial Workers of the World) anthem "Solidarity Forever". Pete Seeger often performed this song and it appears on a number of his recordings. Songwriter and labor singer Bucky Halker includes the Talmadge version, entitled "Our Battle Song," on his CD Don't Want Your Millions (Revolting Records 2000). Halker also draws heavily on the Knights songs and poems in his book on labor song and poetry, For Democracy, Workers and God: Labor Song-Poems and Labor Protest, 1865-1895 (University of Illinois Press, 1991).

=== Racism and wages ===
The Knights of Labor supported the 1882 Chinese Exclusion Act, claiming industrialists were using Chinese workers as a wedge to keep wages low. In addition to supporting legislation including the Exclusion Act and the 1885 Alien Contract Labor Law, the Knights of Labor continued their agenda through racially motivated attacks on Chinese workers and their property.

Chinese workers were one of the only groups excluded from the Knights of Labor, even if immigrants from non-Western Europe were considered to be second-class citizens at this time. Alexander Saxton wrote "only at accepting Chinese did the Knights generally draw the line." The Knights of Labor consistently made efforts towards many problems in the workforce but often left out any advances that would benefit the Chinese communities.

Anti-Chinese rhetoric and violence were more prevalent among the western chapters of the Knights. In 1880, San Francisco Knights wrote, "They bear the semblance of men, but live like beasts...who eat rice and the offal of the slaughterhouse." The article also calls Chinese "natural thieves" and states that all Chinese women are prostitutes. In March 1882, Knights joined the San Francisco rally to demand expulsion of the Chinese. Several years later, mobs led by the Knights of Labor rounded up Seattle's Chinese-born workers and campaigned to prevent further immigration.

Historian Catharine Collomp notes that "Chinese exclusion was the only issue about which the Knights of Labor and the American Federation of Labor constantly lobbied the federal government."

=== The Haymarket Affair ===
The American labor movement, including those in the Knights of Labor, rallied for an eight-hour workday, protesting with the slogan: "Eight Hours for Work, Eight Hours for Rest, Eight Hours for What We Will." Through Eight Hour rallies and legislative lobbying, labor leaders came into direct conflict with employers, who neither accepted unions nor believed that governments should intervene on workers' behalf. During an Eight Hour campaign in Chicago in 1886, a conflict between organized laborers and employers turned violent. By the mid-1880s, Chicago was the center of immigrant and working-class organizing, with a wide array of labor organizations. Demands for the eight-hour workday were at the heart of a strike against one of Chicago's most powerful employers, the McCormick Harvesting Machine Company, which refused to bargain with the union.

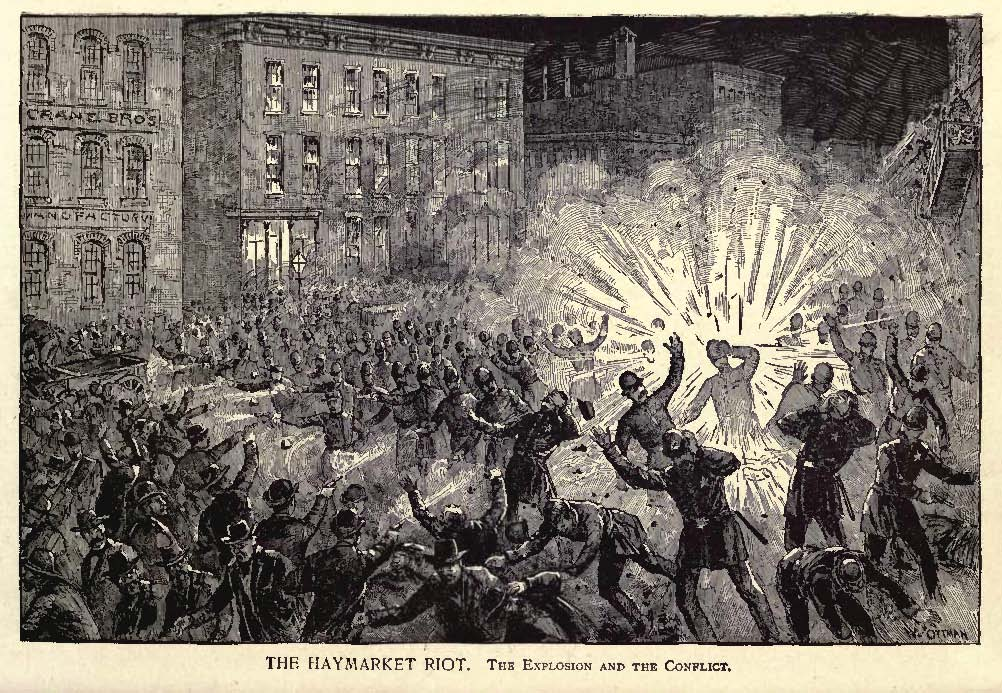
The explosion that started the Haymarket Affair

While workingmen had gathered to strike against the plant, some had drawn fire from authorities. City police and private guards had injured and killed some of the strikers, prompting reaction from the larger crowd, including anarchists Albert Parsons, Michael Schwab, August Spies, Adolph Fischer, and labor organizer Oscar Neebe. On 4 May 1886, they organized a protest in Chicago's Haymarket Square. After the main speakers, Parson and Spies, left the platform, someone from the crowd threw a bomb into a group of police standing in the square, which left seven police dead, and sixty protesters from the crowd injured. Afterwards, the eight anarchists were arrested and seven of them were sentenced to death in a trial that focused on political beliefs, not the actions of the anarchists. Two of the condemned had their sentences commuted; but after Louis Lingg committed suicide in prison, the remaining four were executed.

The Haymarket trial led to a nationwide campaign to round up anarchists and a steep decline in the Knights of Labor's membership. Terence Powderly, the Knights' president, disavowed the Haymarket eight, even as local trade unions and Knights assemblies around the country protested the arrests. Rapid growth of the Knights of Labor in the late nineteenth weakened the bonds that held it together. New Knights members had joined the organization in the wake of its victories over southwestern railroads, but without fully understanding or accepting the Knights' movement culture. While it would be over a decade before the Knights disbanded, these organizational weaknesses, and the strength of the new trade federation union, led to the Knights' decline.

== Leadership ==
=== Grand Master Workmen ===
1878: Uriah Smith Stephens
1879: Terence V. Powderly
1893: James Sovereign
1897: Henry A. Hicks
1898: John N. Parsons
1900: Isaac D. Chamberlain
1900: Simon Burns
1901: Henry A. Hicks
1902: John Hayes

=== Grand Worthy Foremen ===
1878: Ralph Beaumont
1879: Terence V. Powderly
1879: Richard Griffiths
1882: Ralph Beaumont
1883: Henry A. Coffeen
1884: Richard Griffiths
1888: Morris L. Wheat
1890: Hugh Cavanaugh
1893: Michael J. Bishop
1896: Thomas McGuire
1897: Isaac D. Chamberlain
1901: Arthur McConnell
1902: Isaac A. Sanderson
1910s: William A. Denison

== See also ==
- Labor history of the United States
- Labor unions in the United States
- Labor federation competition in the United States
- IWW
- Olivier-David Benoît
- Mary Harris Jones
- Mary Stirling, first woman delegate to annual convention

== Works cited ==
- Foner, Philip (1977). American Socialism and Black Americans: From The Age of Jackson to World War II. Greenwood Publishing Group. ISBN 0837195454.
