= Alien Contract Labor Law =

The 1885 Alien Contract Labor Law (Sess. II Chap. 164; 23 Stat. 332), also known as the Foran Act, was an act to prohibit the importation and migration of foreigners and aliens under contract or agreement to perform labor in the United States, its territories, and the District of Columbia.

== Background ==
The late 19th century in American history marked a period of expanding industrialization and national security concerns. In the north, manufacturing was growing at an unprecedented rate while the south took over the textile industry. The United States was feeling a virtually never ending demand for cheap labor. The process of industrialization and urbanization was a main attraction for immigrants to the U.S. The Contract Labor Law of 1864 established a policy of encouraging immigration by supporting companies who would provide passage to their workers in exchange for labor. The law was soon repealed but demonstrates the national support of what was called at the time a "flood" of immigrants.

In the 1880s, immigration from Southern, Central, and Eastern Europe rose dramatically and immigrant populations from this region became more influential in American public policy. A once welcomed group, the Chinese, became the target of restrictive immigration policy, including the 1882 Chinese Exclusion Act. With the dramatically increasing numbers of all immigrants but most specifically a reaction to Chinese "coolie" labor in the U.S., a new concern came before Congress, the influence that immigrant labor had on the labor market and the native worker. As wages were driven down, contract labor became a rallying point for anti-immigration sentiment.

== The law ==
The first version of the Alien Contract Labor Law of February 26, 1885, was written in comprehensive terms and stated in its first section,

It shall be unlawful for any person, company, partnership, or corporation, in any manner whatsoever, to prepay the transportation, or in any way assist or encourage the importation or migration of any alien or aliens, any foreigner or foreigners, into the United States, its Territories, or the District of Columbia, under contract or agreement, parol or special, express or implied, made previous to the importation or migration of such alien or aliens, foreigner or foreigners, to perform labor or service of any kind in the United States, its Territories, or the District of Columbia.

The second section of the law voided all contracts or agreements if made prior to immigration.

The next two sections provided penalties including a fine of 1,000 dollars for employers who knowingly bring a contract laborer into the country.

Fifth section provides an outline of exemptions from the act. They are: (1) foreigners temporarily in the United States and engaging other foreigners as secretaries, servants, or domestics, (2) skilled laborers, provided that such laborers cannot be obtained in the U.S. (3) professional actors, artists, lecturers, or singers, or persons employed strictly as a personal or domestic servants.

Finally, exempt was (4) assistance by a resident of a member of his family or a personal friend to come for the purpose of settlement.

== Amendment ==
On February 7, 1887, the O'Neill bill was passed which amended the Contract Labor Law of 1885. It added three major sections to the original act. The problem was largely that although the law was sweeping in its prohibition of labor contracts, it was virtually impossible to enforce.

The new sections charged the secretary of the treasury with enforcement of the act, gave him power to establish needful rules and regulations, and provided that prohibited persons were to be sent back on arrival.

== Discrimination in the law ==
Not only was the Contract Labor Law largely a response to Chinese "coolie" labor but it explicitly had exemptions written into the law that demonstrated occupational preference. That is, the exemptions did not restrict the movement of workers who had a skilled trade or one that did not fall into the union movement that was happening at the time, but they excluded "Professional actors, artists, lecturers, or singers, nor to persons employed as strictly personal or domestic servants."

A later act amended the 1885 act by adding ministers of any religious denomination, persons belonging to any recognized profession, and professors for colleges and seminaries to the occupational classes exempt from the contract labor law.
