= Terence V. Powderly =

American labor union leader, politician and attorney (1849–1924)

Terence Powderly
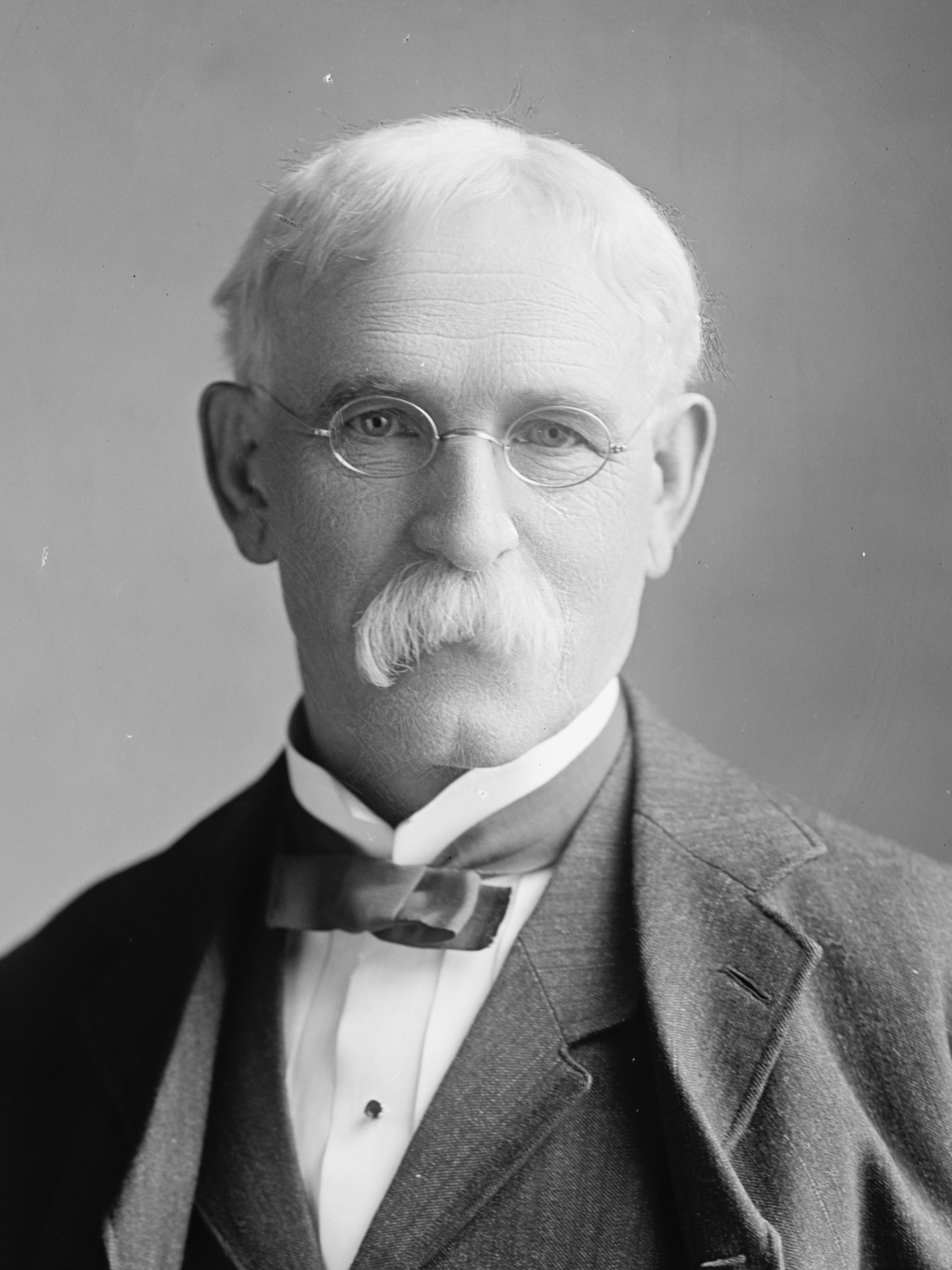
- Powderly, 1905–1924

Commissioner General of Immigration
- In office July 1, 1897 – June 24, 1902
- President: William McKinley; Theodore Roosevelt
- Preceded by: Herman Stump
- Succeeded by: Frank P. Sargent

Grand Master Workman of the Knights of Labor
- In office September 2, 1879 – November 27, 1893
- Preceded by: Uriah Smith Stephens
- Succeeded by: James Sovereign

Grand Worthy Foreman of the Knights of Labor
- In office 1879
- Preceded by: Ralph Beaumont
- Succeeded by: Richard Griffiths

5th Mayor of Scranton
- In office 1878–1884
- Preceded by: Robert H. McKune
- Succeeded by: Francis A. Beamish

Personal details
- Born: Terence Vincent Powderly; January 22, 1849 Carbondale, Pennsylvania, U.S.
- Died: June 24, 1924 (aged 75) Washington, D.C., U.S.
- Resting place: Rock Creek Cemetery
- Party: Republican
- Other political affiliations: Greenback-Labor
- Spouses: Hannah Dever (m. 1872; died 1907); Emma Fickenscher (m. 1919)
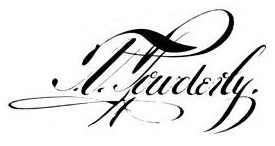
- Signature

Terence Vincent Powderly (June 7 1849– June 24, 1924) was an American labor union leader, politician and attorney, who was the Grand Master Workman of the Knights of Labor from 1879 to 1893.

Born in Carbondale, Pennsylvania, he was later elected mayor of Scranton, Pennsylvania, for three 2-year terms, starting in 1878. A Republican, he served as the United States Commissioner General of Immigration in 1897. The Knights of Labor was one of the largest American labor organizations of the 19th century, but Powderly was a poor administrator and could barely keep it under control. His small central office could not supervise or coordinate the many strikes and other activities sponsored by union locals. Powderly believed that the Knights were an educational tool to uplift the workingman, and he often cautioned against the use of strikes to achieve workers' goals.

Powderly's influence reportedly led to the passing of the alien contract labor law in 1885 and the establishment of labor bureaus and arbitration boards in many states. The Knights failed to maintain its large membership after being blamed for the violence of the Haymarket Riot of 1886. It was increasingly upstaged by the American Federation of Labor under Samuel Gompers, which coordinated numerous specialized craft unions that appealed to skilled workers, instead of the mix of unskilled, semiskilled, and skilled workers in the Knights.

== Early life ==
Terence Vincent Powderly was born the 11th of 12 children on January 22, 1849, to Irish parents who had come up from poverty, Terence Powderly and Madge Walsh, who had emigrated to the United States in 1827. (Note: Although tongue-in-cheek, Powderly himself claims to have been found in an old log by a doctor, and left with his mother, who happened to have the home in closest proximity.) As a child he contracted the measles, as well as scarlet fever which left him deaf in one ear.

At the age of 13 he began work for the railroad as a switchman with the Delaware and Hudson Railway, before becoming a car examiner, repairer and eventually a brakeman. On August 1, 1866, at the age of 17, he entered into an apprenticeship as a machinist with the local master mechanic, James Dickson, at which he was employed until August 15, 1869. Dickson himself had apprenticed to George Stephenson.

On November 21, 1871, Powderly joined the Subordinate Union No. 2 of Pennsylvania, part of the Machinists and Blacksmiths International Union, and a year later was elected as its secretary, before eventually becoming president. On September 19, 1872, Powderly married Hannah Dever. (Note: Reflecting on his marriage to Denver, Powderly wrote, "That union followed an understanding that perfect equality should exist between us, there would be but one treasury, that each should have equal right to it, that liberty of action and speech should always prevail between us. For nearly thirty years we lived up to that compact.")

Following the Panic of 1873, Powderly was dismissed from this position at the railroad. In recalling the conversation, Powderly wrote that the master mechanic he worked for had explained to him, "You are the president of the union and it is thought best to dismiss you in order to head off trouble." He then spent the following winter in Canada working odd jobs. (Note: As Powderly himself wrote: "Occasionally I earned a quarter or half dollar, shoveling snow … Once I earned Seventy five dollars for chaperoning a drove of pigs – I know I earned seventy-five dollars, but received only seventy-five cents. My intimate association with pigs on that occasion was an education. I learned to know that not only has a pig a will of his own but several of them, and each separate will influences him to start, regardless of destination, in different directions at one and the same time.") He returned to the US in 1874, working briefly in Galion, Ohio before moving on to Oil City, Pennsylvania for six months, where he joined Pennsylvania Union No. 6. In August of that year, he was elected by No. 6 as a delegate to a district meeting representing Pittsburgh, Oil City, Meadville, and Franklin, and was in turn elected to represent the district at the general convention in Louisville, Kentucky in September. Powderly was also a member of the Irish nationalist organization Clann na Gael.

== Scranton ==
Powderly ended his travels in Scranton, Pennsylvania, where he found work as a machinist installing coal breakers. Two weeks after taking the position, he was dismissed after being identified by the same man who had been instrumental in his previous dismissal in 1872. In response, he appealed to William Walker Scranton, who had given him the position to start. After explaining to Scranton that he had been fired originally due to his connection to the union, Powderly recalled:

He asked me if I was president then, I answered in the negative, but in order to be fully understood told him that I was at the time secretary. His next question was "If I reinstate you will you resign from the union?" My answer to that was: "I am insured for one thousand dollars in the union. I cannot afford any other insurance. If I resign and am killed in the employ of this company, will it pay my wife one thousand dollars?" He looked steadily at me a while and said: "Go to the mill and tell Davidson to set you to work."

Through W. W. Scranton, Powderly went on to work for the Dickson Manufacturing Company, a firm founded by the sons of his apprentice master. He was again dismissed through the involvement of the same individual, and was again reinstated by Scranton, now in charge of the department, where he worked until May 31, 1877, when it closed for lack of work.

In 1878 following strikes and unrest in 1877, Powderly was elected to the first of three two-year terms as mayor of Scranton, Pennsylvania, representing the Greenback-Labor Party. During the election he proposed financing public works project through low interest government loans as a means of providing work for the many unemployed. After assuming office, he immediately reorganized the labor force and enacted moderate reforms.

== Knights of Labor ==
Powderly is most remembered for leading the Knights of Labor ("K of L"), a nationwide labor union. He joined the Knights in 1874, became Secretary of a District Assembly in 1877. He was elected Grand Master Workman in 1879 after the resignation of Uriah Smith Stephens. At the time the Knights had around 10,000 members. He served as Grand Master Workman until 1893.

Powderly, along with most white labor leaders at the time, opposed the immigration of Chinese workers to the United States. He argued that non- European immigrants took jobs away from native-born Americans and drove down wages. He urged West Coast branches of the Knights of Labor to campaign for the passage of the Chinese Exclusion Act. In speaking on nationwide violence against the "Chinese evil", Powderly blamed the "indifference of our law-makers to the just demands of the people for relief."

Powderly worked with Bishop James Gibbons of to persuade the Pope to remove sanctions against Catholics who joined unions. The Catholic Church had opposed the unions as too influenced by rituals of freemasonry. The Knights of Labor removed the words "The Holy and Noble Order of" from the name of the Knights of Labor in 1882 and abandoned any membership rituals associated with freemasonry.

Individually, workingmen are weak, and, when separated, each one follows a different course, without accomplishing anything for himself or his fellow man; but when combined in one common bond of brotherhood, they become as the cable, each strand of which, though weak and insignificant enough in itself, is assisted and strengthened by being joined with others, and the work that one could not perform alone is easily accomplished by a combination of strands.

— Terence Powderly, The Organization of Labor

Powderly was more influenced by the Greenback ideology of producerism than by socialism, a rising school of thought in Europe and the United States. Since producerism regarded most employers as "producers", Powderly disliked strikes. At times, the Knights organized strikes against local firms where the employer might be admitted as a member. The strikes would drive away the employers, resulting in a more purely working-class organization.

Despite his personal ambivalence about labor action, Powderly was skillful in organizing. The success of the Great Southwest railroad strike of 1886 against Jay Gould's railroad more than compensated for the internal tension of his organization. The Knights of Labor grew so rapidly that at one point the organization called a moratorium on the issuance of charters.

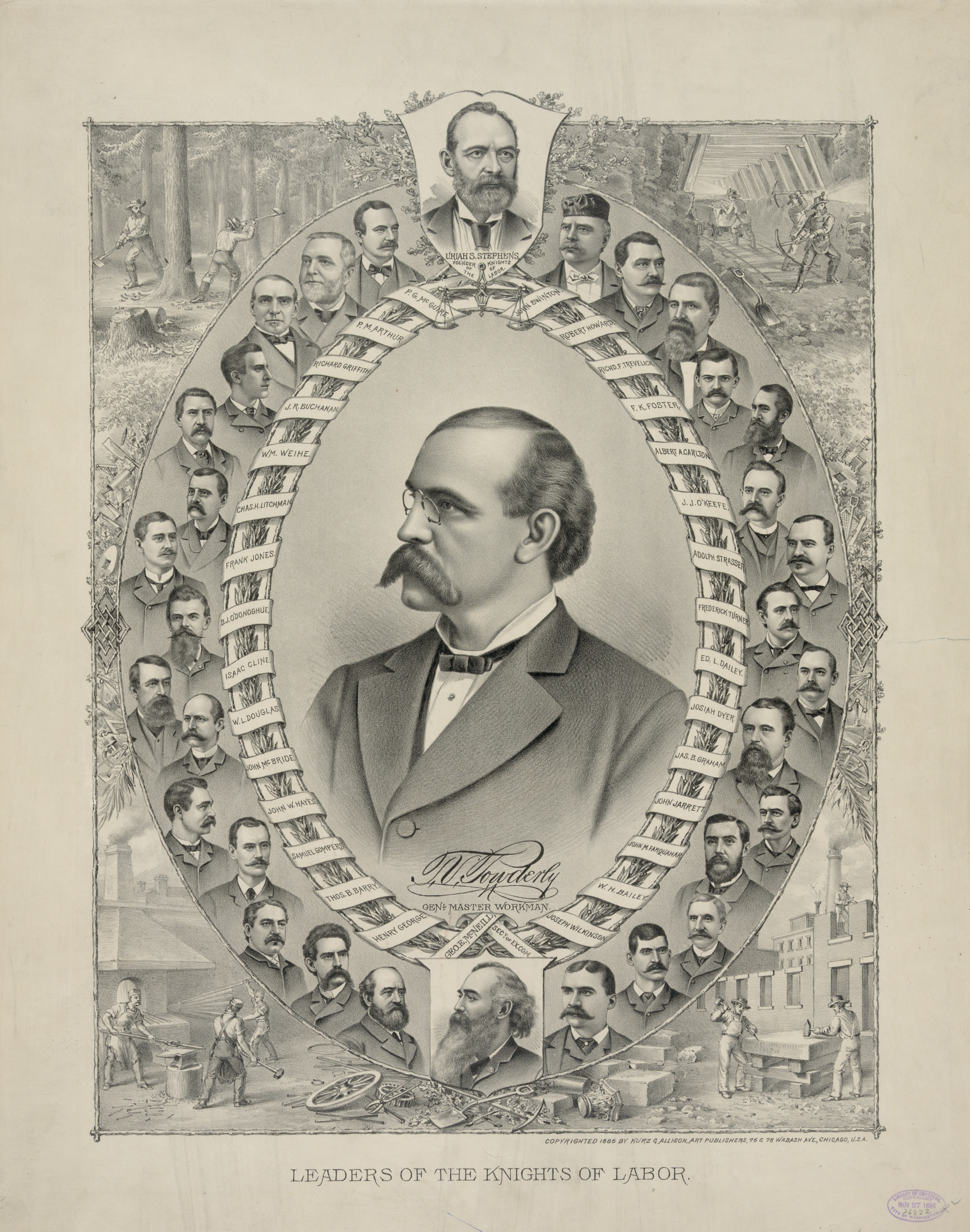
Print of the Knights of Labor leadership with Powderly featured in the center, 1886

The union was recognized as the first successful national labor union in the United States. In 1885-86 the Knights achieved their greatest influence and greatest membership. Powderly attempted to focus the union on cooperative endeavors and the eight-hour day. Soon the demands placed on the union by its members for immediate improvements, and the pressures of hostile business and government institutions, forced the Knights to function like a traditional labor union. However, the Knights were too disorganized to deal with the centralized industries that they were striking against. Powderly forbade them to use their most effective tool: the strike. Powderly intervened in two labor actions: the first against the Texas and Pacific Railroad in 1886 and the second against the Chicago Meatpackinghouse industry. 25,000 workers in the Union Stockyards struck for an 8-hour day in 1886 and to rescind a wage reduction. In both cases, Powderly ended strikes that historians believe that labor could have won. This is when the Knights of Labor began to lose its influence. Powderly also feared losing the support of the Catholic Church, which many immigrant workers belonged to; the church authorities were essentially conservative and feared that the K of L was plotting a "socialist revolution".

Powderly's insistence on ending both these strikes meant that the companies did not fear the K of L would use strikes as direct action to gain wage and labor benefits. After this, both Jay Gould and the Chicago Packinghouses won complete victories in breaking both strikes.

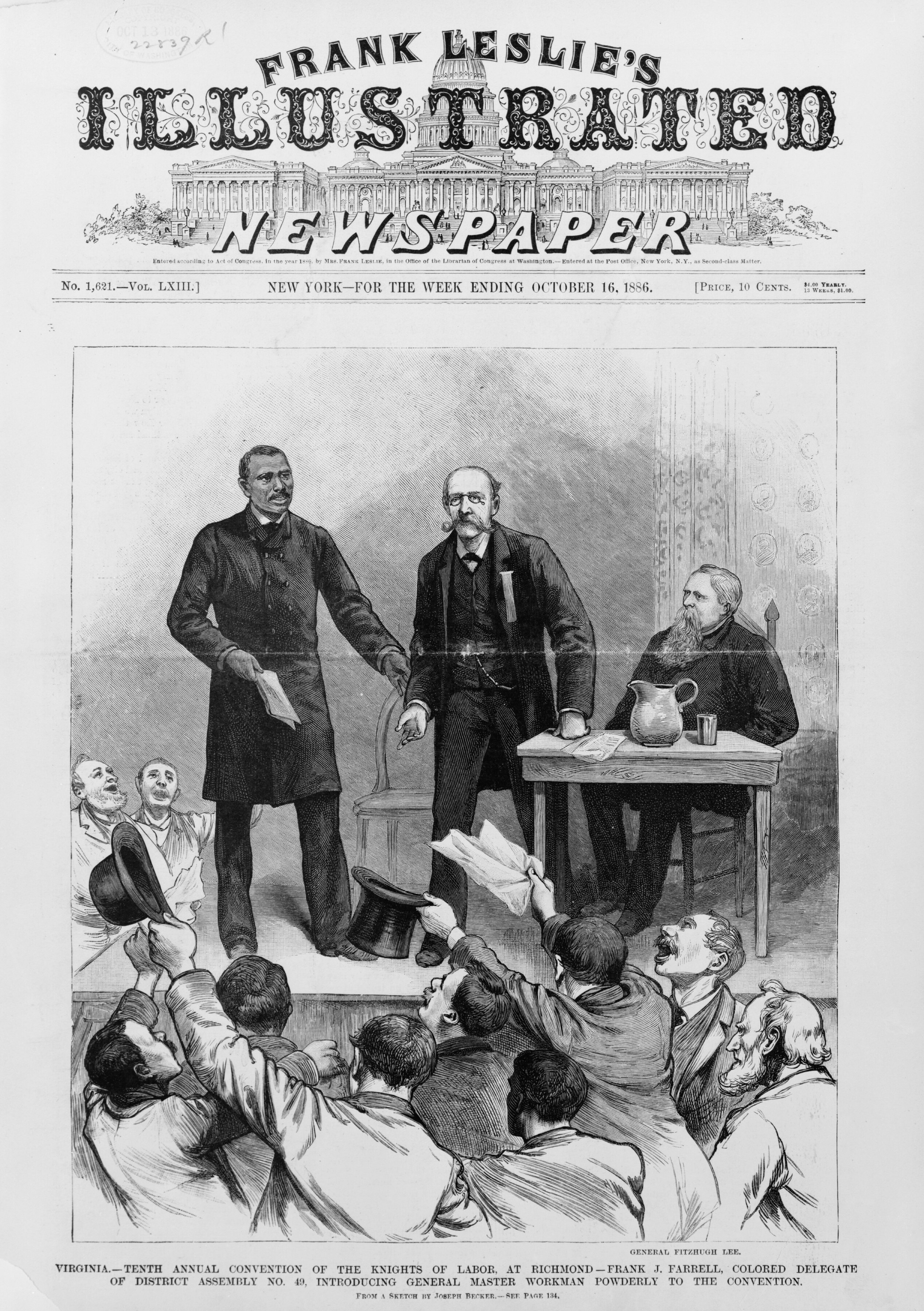
A depiction of Powderly being introduced to the tenth annual convention of the Knights of Labor in Richmond, Virginia by an African American delegate, Frank J. Farrell, on the front page of Frank Leslie's Illustrated Newspaper, October 16, 1886

During the Knight's 1886 general assembly in Richmond, Virginia, Powderly purposely invited an African American delegate, Frank J. Farrell, to introduce him before his speech. This was intended by Powderly as an attack on Richmond's segregation codes.

Disaster struck the Knights with the Haymarket Square Riot in Chicago on May 4, 1886. Anarchists were blamed, and two of them were Knights. Membership plunged overnight as a result of false rumors linking the Knights to anarchism and terrorism. However the disorganization of the group and its record of losing strike after strike disillusioned many members. Bitter factionalism divided the union, and its forays into electoral politics were failures because Powderly forbade its members to engage in political activity or to field candidates.

Many KoL members joined more conservative alternatives, especially the Railroad brotherhoods, and the unions affiliated with the American Federation of Labor (AFL), which promoted craft unionism over the one all-inclusive union concept. Powderly was defeated for re-election as Master Workman in 1893. As the decline of the Knights continued, Powderly moved on, opening a successful law practice in 1894.

Powderly was also a supporter of Henry George's popular "single tax" on land values.

== Later career ==
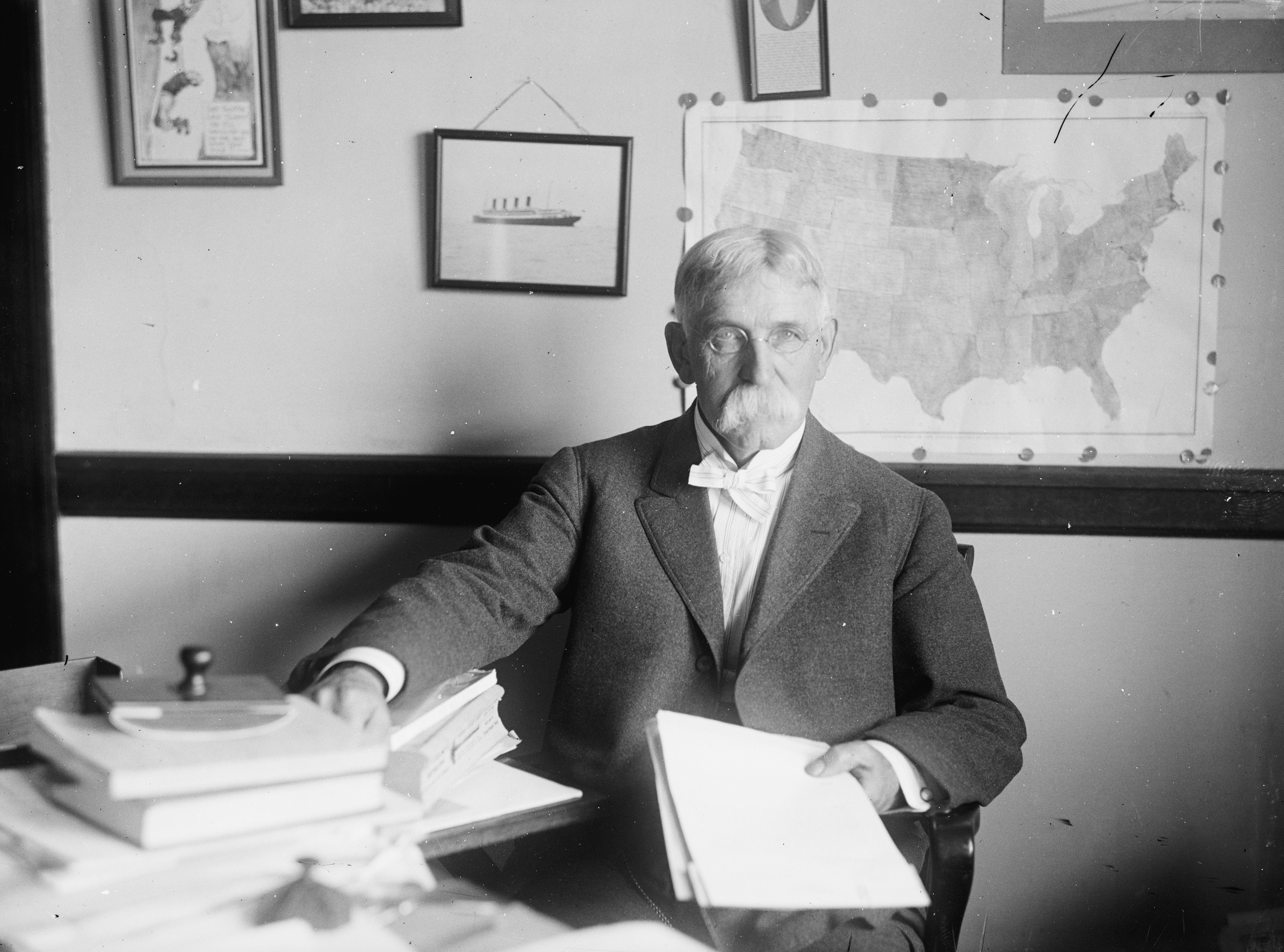
Powderly in his office, 1915

President William McKinley appointed Powderly as the Commissioner General of Immigration where he served from July 1, 1897, to June 24, 1902. In this role he established a commission to investigate conditions at Ellis Island, which ultimately led to 11 employees being dismissed. After being removed from the post in 1902 by Theodore Roosevelt, he continued to serve as Special Immigration Inspector, studying the causes of European emigration to the United States, where he recommended that officials inspect potential immigrants prior to their arrival in the US, station officers on immigrant-carrying ships, and take steps to more evenly distribute arriving immigrant populations geographically across the country.

Terence Powderly was appointed as the chief of the newly created Immigration Service's Division of Information, with a mission, following his own prior recommendation, to "promote a beneficial distribution of aliens admitted into the United States." Finally, in 1921, three years prior to his death, he was appointed as a member of the Immigration Service's Board of Review.

== Death ==
Powderly, a resident of the Petworth neighborhood in Washington, D.C., in the last years of his life, died at his home there on June 24, 1924. He is buried at nearby Rock Creek Cemetery. A second autobiography by Powderly, The Path I Trod, was published posthumously in 1940. Powderly's papers are available for use at more than a dozen research libraries across the United States. He was survived by his second wife, Emma (Fickensher), who was his late wife's cousin and a former work associate, who he had married in 1919.

== Legacy ==
Powderly was inducted into the U.S. Department of Labor Hall of Honor in 1999. The citation reads as follows:

As leader of the Knights of Labor, the nation's first successful trade union organization, Terence V. Powderly thrust the workers' needs to the fore for the first time in U.S. history. In the 1800s, far in advance for the period, he sought the inclusion of blacks, women and Hispanics for full-fledged membership in his trade union. With labor struggling for a place at America's economic table, Powderly achieved national stature as the recognized spokesman for the workers' interest and for the first time made organized labor a political force to be reckoned with.

Writing in Dubofsky and Van Tine's Labor Leaders in America, Richard Oestreicher described Powderly as "the first labor leader in American history to become a media superstar". Oestreicher continues:

No other worker in these years, not even his rival Samuel Gompers, captured as much attention from reporters, from politicians, or from industrialists. To his contemporaries Powderly was the Knights of Labor. (Note: Emphasis in original) (Note: See also Samuel Gompers)

Oestreicher characterizes Powderly's legacy as leader of the Knights as generally one of failure to preserve the organization and its mission through the labor upheavals of the late 19th Century. However, he continues to describe him as an "energetic and capable organizer," and is quick to point out the practical challenges both he and the Knights faced, and that in comparison to his heirs and contemporaries, "quite simply, no one else did much better [than they did] over the next forty years."

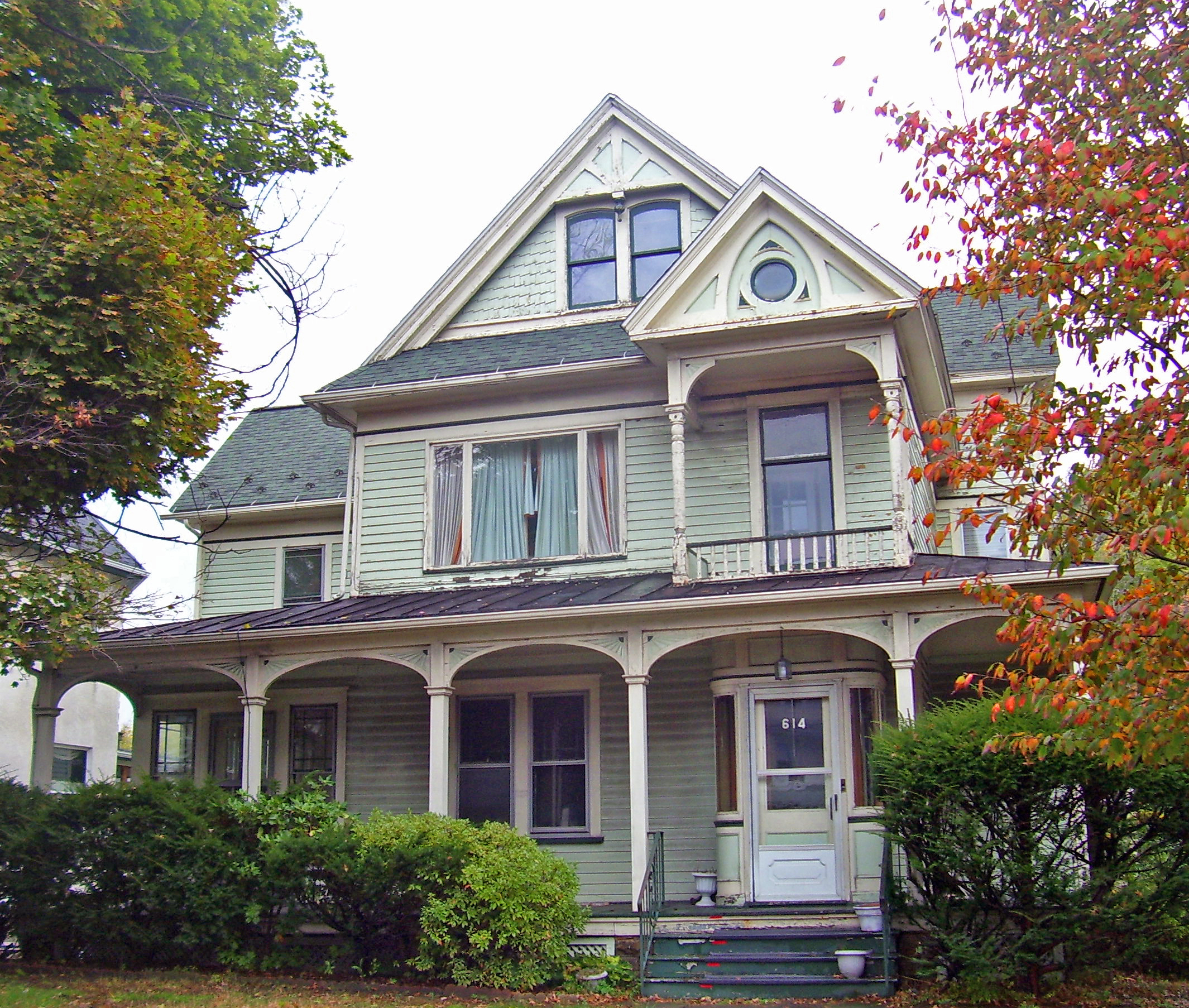
Powderly's Scranton home in 2007

In 1966 Powderly's long time home at 614 North Main Street in Scranton was designated by the National Park Service as a National Historic Landmark. On November 18, 1947, a historical maker was placed in Scranton honoring Powderly. (Note: The marker is located at 41.419479°N 75.674440°W)

== Works ==
- "The Organization of Labor," North American Review, vol. 135, no. 2, whole no. 309 (August 1882), pp. 118–127.
- "The Army of the Discontented," North American Review, vol. 140, whole no. 341 (April 1885), pp. 369–378.
- "A Menacing Irruption," North American Review, vol. 147, whole no. 381 (August 1888), pp. 369–378.
- "The Plea for Eight Hours," North American Review, vol. 150, whole no. 401 (April 1890), pp. 464–470.
- "The Workingman and Free Silver," North American Review, vol. 153, whole no. 421 (December 1891), pp. 728–737.
- Thirty Years of Labor, 1859-1889. Columbus, OH: Excelsior Publishing House 1890.
- "Government Ownership of Railways," The Arena, vol. 7, whole no. 37 (December 1892), pp. 58–63.
- The Path I Trod: The Autobiography of Terence V. Powderly. New York: Columbia University Press, 1940.

== See also ==
- James Duncan (union leader)
- Labor unions in the United States
- List of mayors of Scranton, Pennsylvania
- Rock Springs massacre
- Uriah Smith Stephens

== Notes ==
Political offices
Preceded by Herman Stump	Commissioner General of Immigration; 1897–1902	Succeeded by Frank P. Sargent
