= Scranton Preparatory School =

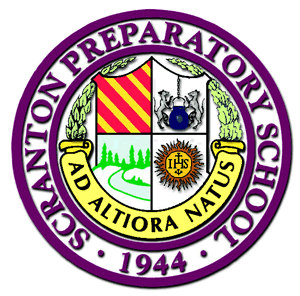

Location
- 1000 Wyoming Avenue; Scranton, Pennsylvania 18509; United States; 41°25′6″N 75°39′14″W

Information
- Type: Private, coeducational
- Motto: Ad Altiora Natus (Born for Higher Things)
- Religious affiliations: Roman Catholic, Jesuit
- Established: 1944; 82 years ago
- President: Father AJ Rizzo, S.J.
- Principal: Kristin Cupillari
- Grades: 9-12
- Campus type: Urban
- Colors: Purple and gold
- Athletics conference: PIAA District 2
- Nickname: Cavaliers (boys); Classics (girls)
- Accreditation: Middle States Association of Colleges and Schools
- Newspaper: The Cavalier Chronicle
- Yearbook: Cavalier
- Tuition: $17,600
- Website: www.scrantonprep.com

Scranton Preparatory School is a co-educational Jesuit high school located in Scranton, Pennsylvania, United States.

== History ==
Scranton Prep opened its doors in 1944. At the request of the Roman Catholic Diocese of Scranton and of Catholic families in the area, the Jesuits who had recently assumed ownership of the University of Scranton began preparations to open a college preparatory school in the Scranton area. Led by the university's president, W. Coleman Nevils, the Jesuits renovated a building known as the “Annex” on the corner of Mulberry Street and Wyoming Avenue for the high school. The Annex, formerly the Dr. Charles E. Thomson Scranton Private Hospital, was acquired by William Hafey in 1941. Although he had intended for it to be used by the university to expand its facilities, the Second World War in Europe had caused the college's enrollment to decline precipitously and made such expansions unnecessary. After renovations were completed, the high school was opened in 1944 for young Catholic men. The Annex served as the high school's home until 1961 when the construction of an expressway necessitated a move to a new location. After making the Old Main Building of the University of Scranton its temporary home for two years, Prep moved to its permanent location, the former Women's Institute Building of the International Correspondence Schools, at 1000 Wyoming Avenue.

Although founded as a boys' school, Scranton Prep became co-educational in 1971 when a fire destroyed Marywood Seminary, a local girls’ academy run by the Immaculate Heart of Mary Sisters.

Although the Prep's staff and operation were for the most part distinct from the university, it was owned by the university and under its corporate control from 1944 until 1977, when it received its official charter of separate incorporation in 1977.

== Notable alumni ==
- Bob Casey, Jr. – United States Senator from Pennsylvania, College of the Holy Cross
- Robert P. Casey – former Governor of Pennsylvania, College of the Holy Cross
- P. J. Carlesimo – NBA coach
- Christopher Doherty – former Mayor of Scranton, Pennsylvania, College of the Holy Cross
- Marty Flynn – member of the Pennsylvania House of Representatives for the 113th District
- Glynn Lunney – NASA engineer
- Malachy E. Mannion – Judge of the United States District Court for the Middle District of Pennsylvania
- Joseph M. McDade – United States Congressman from Pennsylvania
- Robert C. Morlino – Bishop of the Roman Catholic Diocese of Madison
- Christopher L. Paris – 23rd Commissioner of the Pennsylvania State Police

- Terrence Pegula – billionaire natural gas investor and professional sports franchise owner
- Brian Stann – Mixed Martial Artist and color commentator
- Steve Vacendak, basketball player and coach
- James Donald Walsh – United States Ambassador to Argentina
- John A. Walsh – Executive Editor for ESPN, University of Scranton

=== Marywood Seminary ===
- Jean Kerr – Author and playwright
- Lizabeth Scott – Film actress
