= University of Scranton =

Jesuit university in Scranton, Pennsylvania, US

- Former name: St. Thomas College (1888–1938)
- Motto: Religio Mores Cultura (Latin)
- Motto in English: "Religion, Morals, Culture"
- Type: Private university
- Established: 1888; 138 years ago
- Religious affiliation: Catholic (Jesuit)
- Academic affiliations: AJCU ACCU; NAICU CIC
- Endowment: $342.85 million (2025)
- President: Joseph G. Marina
- Faculty: 304
- Students: 4,619 (fall 2025)
- Undergraduates: 3,586 (fall 2025)
- Postgraduates: 1,033 (fall 2025)
- Location: Scranton, Pennsylvania, U.S. 41.405°N 75.655°W
- Campus: Urban, 58 acres (23.5 ha)
- Colors: Purple & white
- Nickname: Royals / Lady Royals
- Sporting affiliations: NCAA Division III - LC
- Mascot: Iggy the Royal Wolf
- Website: scranton.edu

The University of Scranton is a private Jesuit university in Scranton, Pennsylvania, United States. It was founded in 1888 by William O'Hara, the first bishop of the Diocese of Scranton, as St. Thomas College. The university is composed of three colleges that each contain both undergraduate and graduate programs.

The college was elevated to university status and took the name University of Scranton in 1938. It was operated by the Diocese of Scranton from its founding until 1897, and then administered by the De La Salle Brothers from 1888 to 1942. In 1942, the Society of Jesus took ownership and control of the university. During the 1960s, the university became an independent institution under a lay board of trustees.

The university offers 65 bachelor's degrees, 29 master's degrees, and 4 doctoral programs. It enrolls approximately 6,000 graduate and undergraduate students. Most of its students are from Pennsylvania, New Jersey, and New York. In 2016, about 58% of its undergraduate students were women and 42% men. In its graduate programs, about 62% are women students and 38% men. The university has about 300 full-time faculty members, approximately 200 of which are tenured.

== History ==
In 1888 the first bishop of Scranton, William O'Hara, began construction of St. Thomas College, the predecessor of the University of Scranton. In September 1892 the college admitted its first students, 62 young men. Staffing passed from diocesan priests and seminarians, to Xaverian Brothers, and after 1897 to Lasallian Christian Brothers. In 1897 the school was broken into three divisions: the college department, a two-year commercial program, and St. Thomas High School which remained open until 1939. Jesuit priest Daniel J. MacGoldrick came from Georgetown University to serve as president from 1895 until his death in 1900. The college awarded degrees through other colleges until 1924, when it received a State charter to grant bachelor's degrees in arts and science, and the master of science. In 1938, the Christian Brothers renamed the college "University of Scranton" and began admitting women to the evening division.

The Drama Club began productions in 1893. The Aquinas began as a literary monthly in 1915, furnishing also a yearbook edition, evolving into a student newspaper in 1931, and by the 21st century adding a web edition. The current Windhover yearbook was first published in 1948 and named for the bird's loyalty to its master. The Glee Club dates to 1925. In 1931 the college band began playing at sports events and presenting a spring concert. Three members of the university faculty began producing Best Sellers: The Semi-Monthly Book Review in 1941; it remained in print until 1987.

In 1942 governance of the University of Scranton passed over to the Society of Jesuits. In 1944 Scranton Preparatory School was founded, with its first quarters in a former private hospital building; it moved to its present location in 1963 and became independent of the university in 1978.

With the influx of veterans after World War II, three barracks were constructed on the former Scranton Estate and served as classroom space over the following 15 years. After 1946 the athletic teams ceased to be the Tomcats and were called the Royals after the purple color of their uniforms. The Graduate School opened in 1950, soon adding programs in Education, Business Administration, Chemistry, History, and English; all admitted women from the start. In 1951 an Army ROTC unit was established and made obligatory for non-veterans through freshman and sophomore years.

=== Decade of expansion ===
An expansion plan, beginning at $5,000,000, produced fifteen new buildings between 1956 and 1966, with Loyola Hall of Science in 1956 and the first residence halls for students in 1958: Casey, Fitch, Martin, and McCourt. Three years later Denis Edward, Hafey, Lynett, and Hannan residence halls were added. With the death of Worthington Scranton in 1958, the university acquired the remainder of his properties. Alumni Memorial Library was completed in 1960 and Gunster Memorial Student Center in 1961, including the 400-seat Eagen Auditorium. In 1962 the five-storey classroom building St. Thomas Hall was built, which included St. Ignatius Loyola Chapel. At this time the original Wyoming Avenue properties were completely vacated. New construction extended to Driscoll and Nevils residence halls in 1965, raising on-campus housing to 650 male students. In 1967 the first varsity athletic center was completed and named after former president John J. Long who had led the building campaign over more than a decade.

Esprit, the university's review of arts and letters, first appeared in 1958 and Flannery O'Connor, friend of a Jesuit, visited the campus to help get it launched.

=== Late 20th century ===
After campus protests against the Vietnam War in the late 1960s, participation in the ROTC became voluntary in 1969. The same year other regulations were changed: the requirement that students wear coat and tie to class was dropped, students of age were allowed to drink in the dormitories, and only underclassmen with failing grades were subject to a curfew. After 1970 females could visit male dormitories until 10:00 p.m. on weekdays and 2:00 a.m. on weekends. The common core curriculum added options after 1970.

In 1966 a university senate was established, whereby faculty and administrators, and later student representatives, could make recommendations to the board of trustees. Until 1969 the Jesuit community exercised ownership of the university. In 1969 lay members were first admitted to a newly independent Board of Trustees. While women had been admitted to evening school and summer classes since 1938, it was only in 1972 that they were first admitted to the College of Arts and Science. Fitch Hall, the first women's residence, opened that fall.

Linden Street was closed to form the university commons in 1980 and sculptures were added to beautify the campus: Jacob and the Angel (1982), Ignatius of Loyola and fountain (1988), and Christ the Teacher (1998). The World Premiere Composition Series began performing new works by composers in 1984 and has continued this annual showcase. During the 16-year presidency of Jesuit priest Joseph A. Panuska, two capital campaigns enabled the construction of major new buildings, including the Byron Recreational Complex (1986), Hyland classroom building (1988), Harry and Jeanette Weinberg Memorial Library (1992), and McDade Center for the Performing Arts (1993). Upon Panuska's departure, the Board of Trustees renamed in his honor the College of Health, Education, and Human Resources which he had founded in 1987.

=== Twenty-first century ===
In 2000 the Kania School of Management moved to the new, five-storey hall named for John E. Brennan '68. The Department of Physical Therapy, founded in 1980, became in 2004 the university's first doctoral program, receiving CAPTE certification in 2007. In fall 2011, the new Loyola Science Center added 22 class and seminar rooms and 34 laboratories. Pilarz and Montrone halls on Mulberry Street provided more fitness space, a dining area, and apartment-style units to accommodate 400 juniors and seniors. In 2015 Leahy Hall was dedicated to accommodate the area of physical therapy.

In 1942 the university was primarily a commuter school with fewer than 1,000 students. By 2015 it had come to serve a wide region with an enrollment of approximately 5,500 students in undergraduate, graduate, and nontraditional programs. The university's strategic plan for 2015-2020 looks to build on the Jesuit heritage with education that is "engaged, integrated, global".

Between the 2019–2020 and 2022–2023 academic years, the university's enrollment and number of employees both dropped, though net assets increased.

== Academics ==
The university grants undergraduate degrees (Bachelor of Arts and Bachelor of Science) in 65 majors. Students may also utilize many pre-professional concentrations, such as pre-medical, pre-law, and pre-dental. The university also has an Honors Program and the SJLA (Special Jesuit Liberal Arts) Program in which select students complete courses in moral philosophy, ethics, theology, and the humanities in addition to their normal course load.

Students may also register to take classes at Marywood University.

The university also grants graduate degrees in 29 fields, ranging from Accounting and Chemistry to Software Engineering and Theology. The university also offers a Doctor of Physical Therapy program and Doctor of Nursing Practice.

=== Undergraduate curriculum ===
The university offers a liberal arts program. Students are required to take the core courses in composition. Students are also required to take two theology courses, two philosophy courses, and an elective in one of these two areas. Filling out the general education requirements are 6 credits in science courses, 6 credits in writing intensive courses, 6 credits in cultural diversity courses, 3 credits in a mathematics course, 12 credits in humanities courses, and 3 credits in physical education.

=== Honors programs and societies ===
==== Honors program ====
The honors program, first created in 1963 by Academic Vice President William Kelly, stresses independent work and individualized engagement with faculty. The program gives students the opportunity to pursue their research interests through one-on-one tutorials with professors and culminating in a year-long thesis project. Honors Students must take one course, between three and five tutorials, two seminars and the final 6-credit project. Honors courses count toward general education requirements and the tutorials count toward major, minor, cognate or general education requirements. Students can apply to the Honors Program in the fall of their sophomore year. Because a minimum of a 3.5 GPA is required for graduation in the Honors Program, applicants must have at least a 3.3 GPA to be considered. Admission is also based on the applicant's high school and college records, SAT scores, application, recommendations, and interviews. Normally around 50 students are accepted into the program.

==== Business leadership ====
The Business Leadership program (BLDR), an honors program in the Kania School of Management (KSOM), teaches students the key components of leadership. The program includes special sections of key business courses taught from the leadership perspective, leadership seminars, a mentor/internship program, and an independent leadership project. The program culminates in the students preparing portfolios on the essence of leadership, as derived from participation in the program, and defending their concepts of leadership before a faculty board. The program accepts 15 sophomores each spring to begin the two-year curriculum the following fall based upon leadership experience and/or potential, student records from high school and college, involvement in clubs and activities, recommendations from professors, and a minimum GPA of a 3.0, because students need at least a 3.5 GPA to graduate with the program.

==== Special Jesuit Liberal Arts ====
The Special Jesuit Liberal Arts program (SJLA) was established in 1975 to model the traditional Jesuit liberal arts education that emphasizes philosophy, theology, history and literature of the Western classical and Christian ages while providing a way for students to fulfill the general education requirements. Through the courses, students develop enhanced writing, oral and critical-thinking skills while also becoming immersed in a community atmosphere that encourages excellence and service to others and an awareness of contemporary issues. Before the start of freshman year, the most qualified incoming students, usually in the top five percent of applicants, are invited to join the four year SJLA program. Students not selected initially may apply for admission as second semester freshmen or as sophomores.

==== Academic honor societies ====
The University of Scranton maintains local chapters of over thirty different international and national honor societies.

== Rankings ==
Academic rankings

Master's
- Washington Monthly: 100

Regional
- U.S. News & World Report: 6

National
- Forbes: 251
- WSJ/College Pulse: 232

Scranton placed sixth in U.S. News & World Report's 2021 rankings of the "Best Regional Universities North". It was also rated tied for 14th out of 38 in "Best Undergraduate Teaching" and 40th out of 73 in "Best Value Schools".

== Campus buildings and landmarks ==
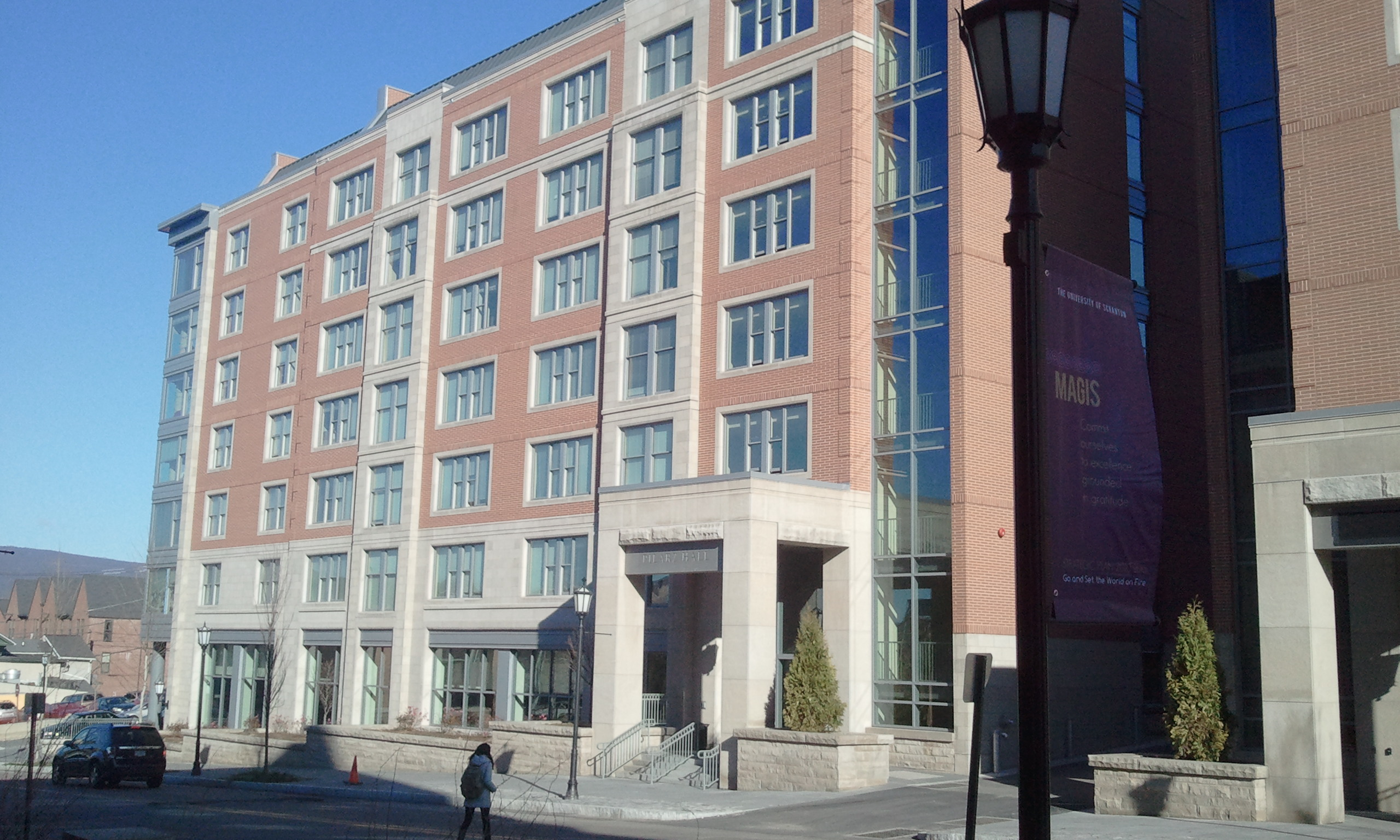
Pilarz Hall is part of the new Mulberry Street Complex, which includes housing, fitness facilities, and a food court.

=== Academic buildings ===
- Alumni Memorial Hall: the building was originally constructed as Alumni Memorial Library in 1960. After the completion of the Weinberg Memorial Library in 1992, it underwent extensive renovations and was converted into Alumni Memorial Hall. It currently houses the Psychology Department and the Division of Planning and Information Resources.
- Brennan Hall: the building was completed in 2000. It houses the departments of the Aruthur J. Kania School of Management. Its five stories contain classrooms, seminar rooms, faculty offices, an advising center, the Pearn Auditorium, and the Irwin E. Alperin Financial Center, which is designed to simulate a stock market trading floor, complete with an electronic ticker and data displays. The fifth floor of Brennan Hall is the Joseph M. McShane Executive Center, which includes a meeting room, a large reception area, the PNC Bank board room, and the Rose Room, an open space used for lectures, events, and dinners.
- Ciszek Hall: the building, originally named the Center for Eastern Christian Studies, was completed in 1987 as an ecumenical and academic institute designed to promote knowledge about and understanding of the religious and cultural traditions of Eastern Christianity. Currently, Cisek Hall houses the university's Office of Career Services, a chapel which celebrates service in the Byzantine Rite, and a library containing 15,000 books.
- Edward R. Leahy, Jr. Hall: the building was completed in 2015. At eight stories tall, it is currently the tallest University building and houses the departments of Exercise Science, Occupational Therapy, and Physical Therapy. Leahy Hall contains 25 interactive rehabilitation laboratories, 9 traditional and active-learning classrooms, research facilities, multiple simulation environments, more than 50 faculty offices, 9 group study rooms, a forum for lectures and events, an Einstein Bros Bagels Cafe, and a green roof and patio. The new building is located on the former site of the old Leahy Hall / YWCA building, on the southwest corner of Jefferson Avenue and Linden Street, which was demolished to make room for the new building.
- Houlihan-McLean Center: the Victorian Gothic style building was constructed in 1910 as the Immanuel Baptist Church. The university acquired the former church in 1986, after its congregation moved to a different church. Currently, it houses the school's Performance Music Program, which includes the university's Orchestra, Bands, and Singers, as well as serving as a site for musical and other arts performances, lectures, and special liturgies. The main floor of the building houses the Aula (an approximately 650-seat concert hall), the Atrium (a recital and reception hall), the Nelhybel Collection Research Room, small ensembles areas, a musicians' lounge, practice rooms, offices, music library, and an organ loft and organ chamber, which holds an historic 1910 Austin Opus 301 symphonic pipe organ.
- Hyland Hall: the building, completed in 1987, is a four-story facility which contains sixteen classrooms and a 180-seat tiered lecture hall, in addition to a cafe, lounge, and the university's Hope Horn Art Gallery. Currently, it mostly houses classes for the Departments of Political Science, Sociology, Criminal Justice, and World Languages and Cultures.
- Institute of Molecular Biology and Medicine: the building was completed in 1996 and houses research laboratories, offices, and the Northeast Regional Cancer Institute. The IMBM is dedicated to the molecular biological research, chiefly in the field of proteomics, in order to find and treat viral diseases and cancer as well as to be able to engineer a patient's immune system to avoid these diseases and to develop DNA probes that could possibly seek out a defective gene that is responsible for cancer.
- Loyola Science Center: completed in 2011, the building houses the university's Biology, Chemistry, Computing Sciences, Mathematics, and Physics/Electrical Engineering departments as well as any programs currently associated with these departments. The construction of the Loyola Science Center involved integrating a new four-story structure into an existing structure, the Harper-McGinnis wing of St. Thomas Hall. The unified building includes 22 class and seminar rooms, 34 laboratories, 80 offices, a 180-seat lecture hall, an atrium and coffee shop, a vivarium, and a rooftop greenhouse for research.
- McDade Center for Literary and Performing Arts: constructed in 1992, the building serves as the home for the university's English & Theatre department. It contains classrooms, offices, labs, meeting spaces, a black box studio theatre, the 300-seat Royal Theater where the University Players stage their productions, computer writing and instructions lab, a seminar room, a small screening room for film classes and an office for Esprit, the university's Review of Arts and Letters.
- McGurrin Hall: the building was completed in 1998. It houses many of the departments in the J.A. Panuska College of Professional Studies, including Education, Nursing, Counseling and Human Services, and Health Administration and Human Resources. McGurrin's four stories include classrooms, laboratories, teaching instruction labs, and counseling suites as well as the Panuska College of Professional Studies' advising center and administration offices. In the basement of McGurrin Hall, the university created the Leahy Community Health & Family Center, which meets the health and wellness needs of underserved individuals in the greater Scranton community while providing a place where faculty guide students in a practical educational experience through its programs, which include the University of Success, the Alice V. Leahy Food and Clothing Pantry, the Edward R. Leahy, Jr. Center Clinic, "Peacemakers After School," and "Growing Stronger."
- O'Hara Hall: the Neoclassical, six-story building was built in 1922 as the administrative headquarters for the Glen Alden Coal Company. Acquired by the university in 1968, it originally housed the departments of the Kania School of Management until the construction of Brennan Hall. It now serves as the home for the Dexter Hanley College (now the College of Graduate and Continuing Education), Alumni Relations, the Annual Fund, Continuing Education, Development, the World Languages and Cultures department, Instructional Development, the Learning Resource Center, the Political Science department, Public Relations, and the Sociology and Criminal Justice department. It contains classrooms, faculty offices, supporting administrative services, conference rooms, and the language learning laboratory.
- St. Thomas Hall: the building, constructed at the corner of Linden and Monroe Streets, was completed in 1962. At the time of its completion, the five-story L-shaped building contained 50 classrooms, 15 utility rooms, 11 equipment rooms, 10 corridors, 128 offices, ROTC offices, student lounges, the St. Ignatius Loyola Chapel, and four laboratories. In 1987, the Harper-McGinnis Wing, a two-floor addition that contained offices and laboratories, was added to St. Thomas Hall to house the Physics and Electronics Engineering department. Recently, in 2009 and 2011, St. Thomas underwent significant renovations. The chapel was converted into offices for Human Resources and Financial Aid and it now houses the departments of Theology and Religious Studies, Communications, Philosophy, History as well as the office of LA/WS, or Latin American and Women's Studies, and the university's radio station, 99.5 WUSR.
- Smurfit Arts Center: the Romanesque building was constructed in 1906 as the Universalist John Raymond Memorial Church. The university acquired the property in 1987, after its congregation moved to a different church. Currently, it houses the Fine Arts program, including faculty offices, classrooms, and a studio. Originally, the church contained Tiffany Glass stained glass windows, which were moved to Hyland Hall to provide optimum and natural lighting for the studio.
- Weinberg Memorial Library: the Library was completed in 1992, replacing Alumni Memorial Library which proved unable to serve adequately the growing student population, to house the vast library collections, and lacked the necessary wiring for modernizing the library with new technological advances. The Library has five floors, which seat approximately 700 students at one time and hold the university's extensive library collections. The Library is home to the University of Scranton Archives and Special Collections. In addition to study space and books, it contains administrative offices, two classrooms, group study rooms, a Java City cafe, the Reilly Learning Commons, and the Scranton Heritage Room, an open hall used to host campus and community events and to exhibit artifacts and documents from the university's archives and special collections, showcases of faculty scholarship and university alumni authors, and the library's Environmental Art Show.

=== Additional facilities ===
- Brown Hall: the Classicial Revivalist building was constructed in 1896. Acquired by the university in 2012, the four-story structure contains University offices, including the Small Business Development Center and the Division of External Affairs as well as some retail spaces on the first floor, rented out to various businesses.
- Byron Recreation Center: completed in 1986, the building serves as the home for recreational and intramural activities for the university's student body. The three-level structure connects to the Long Center, the facility for intercollegiate athletics. The facility contains three multi-use courts for basketball, volleyball, tennis, and one-wall handball as well as a one-tenth mile indoor running track, a six-lane Olympic-sized swimming pool complete with diving boards and an electronic scoreboard, four 4-wall racquetball courts, two different aerobics/dance rooms, and men's and women's locker rooms.
- Campion Hall: the building, completed in 1987, is the university's residence building for the Jesuit community, who originally lived in the Estate since their arrival at the university in 1942, which proved too small to accommodate the priests. The two-story building features thirty-one bedrooms, an interior garden, an office, kitchen and dining facilities, and a chapel. Currently, Campion Hall provides housing for Jesuits who teach or hold administrative positions at the University of Scranton or at Scranton Preparatory School, a local Jesuit high school.
- Chapel of the Sacred Heart: completed in 1928, the building was originally part of the Scranton Estate, designed as a small athletic facility, containing a gym and a squash court. The building, after being donated to the university in 1958, served as the center of athletics, a print shop, and the headquarters for the university's Alumni Association before being converted into a chapel in 2009. Currently, the chapel is used for daily masses, Eucharistic Adoration, and prayer by students, faculty, and staff of the University of Scranton.
- DeNaples Center: the campus center completed in 2008, replacing the Gunster Memorial Student Center, since its facilities could no longer effectively serve the expanding student body. The DeNaples Center houses the campus bookstore, the student mail center, commuter lockers, a Provisions on Demand (P.O.D.) convenience, a dining hall, a fireplace lounge, the Rev. Bernard R. McIllhenny, S.J. Ballroom, meeting rooms, the Ann and Leo Moscovitz Theater, and the first floor DeNaples Food Court, a retail dining option which includes Starbucks Coffee, Chick-Fil-A, and Quizno's. The center also contains offices for Student Affairs, University Ministries, and the Student Forum which comprises the Center for Student Engagement, the University of Scranton Programming Board (USPB), the Aquinas newspaper, the Windhover yearbook, the Jane Kopas Women's Center, the Multicultural Center, Student Government, and Community Outreach.
- Dionne Green: in 2008, after the completion of the DeNaples Center and the subsequent demolition of Gunster Memorial Student Center, the university created the Dionne Green, a 25,000-square-foot green space roughly the size of a football field featuring a 3,600 sq ft outdoor amphitheater. Located directly in front of the DeNaples Center, it serves as the gateway to the campus.
- The Estate: in 1867, Joseph H. Scranton, one of the founders of the city of Scranton, commissioned the building of his family home in the French Second Empire Style, which was completed in 1871. The twenty-five room, three story residence contained a billiards room, a ballroom, a library, a Tiffany Glass skylight, and a solid mahogany staircase. The Estate was occupied by members of the Scranton family until 1941, when Worthington Scranton donated the home and its adjoining estate to the university. The home was used as the Jesuit residence from 1942 until 1987 and currently houses the Admissions Office.
- Fitzpatrick Field: the field was completed in 1984. The facility was designed as a multi-sports complex, complete with a regulation-size field for men's and women's soccer which also can be used for other sports such as lacrosse, field hockey, and intramural athletics. It also has bleachers, an electronic scoreboard, a maintenance building, a storage area, and a parking lot. In 1997, a re-dedication ceremony celebrated the installation of new artificial turf and improved lighting for the field. Currently, Fitzpatrick Field remains the university's primary outdoor athletic facility.
- Founder's Green: in 2001, after the demolition of the Gallery Building whose departments had been moved to O'Hara and Hyland Halls, the university created Founder's Green, a large, open green space in front of Brennan Hall.
- Galvin Terrace: after the completion of St. Thomas Hall and the subsequent demolition of the Barracks buildings, the university created an outdoor recreation facility, containing four volleyball courts, three basketball courts, a grass practice field for football and soccer, and a faculty parking lot. Later, after renovations, it included six tennis courts, two combination basketball/volleyball courts, and four handball/racquetball courts. In the early 1990s, the recreational complex was demolished to make room for the Weinberg Memorial Library and now a small garden outside the Library is known as Galvin Terrace.
- Long Center: completed in 1967, the building contained the university's first indoor athletic facilities, as well as instructional areas for physical education. At the time of its construction, the top floor featured a large entrance foyer and a gymnasium, complete with movable bleacher seats that could accommodate up to 4,500 people. The gymnasium contained three basketball courts, two ticket rooms, a sound control room, locker room facilities, a training room, a weight room, a wrestling room, laundry facilities, and equipment room, and offices for the director and assistants of the physical education program as well as athletic coaches.
- Mosque: in 1996, the university community renovated a university-owned house at 317 North Webster Avenue into the Campus Mosque as a gift to the Muslim community of Scranton. The Mosque contained two large, spacious rooms as the women's and men's prayer rooms, a library, and an apartment where two members of the Muslim Student Association lived and served as caretakers of the facility. In 2007, the Mosque, along with several other properties, was razed in order to create a site for the sophomore residence, Condron Hall. The university then purchased and renovated a house at 306 Taylor Avenue for use as the new mosque, which is open to the public for prayer and reflection.
- Pantle Rose Garden: when the University of Scranton acquired the Scranton family estate in the mid-1950s, the school received the garden, located next to the Chapel of the Sacred Heart on the former grounds of the Estate.
- Quain Memorial Conservatory: the Victorian-style structure, built in 1872, was part of the Scranton family Estate and donated to the university in 1958. The glass building has a central square (20 ft by 20 ft) flanked by two 40 ft by 15 ft wings on either side. At the time of its construction, each section had its own pool. In the early 1970s, the student-led University Horticultural Society coordinated and organized an effort to renovate and restore the greenhouse. Currently, the greenhouse is used for classes as well as faculty and personal research projects.
- Retreat Center at Chapman Lake: in 1961, the University of Scranton purchased a nine-acre tract of lakefront property containing three buildings on Chapman Lake, about 30 minutes away from the university. For several years, it was chiefly used as a place for relaxation by the Jesuits and for conferences with faculty members and student leaders. As time progressed, the university's Office of Campus Ministries began using the Chapman Lake property as a Retreat Center. In 2005, in order to meet the growing demand for retreats, the university expanded the Retreat Center again. The new addition contained a lounge, 21 more bedrooms, and the Peter Faber chapel with large window views of the Lake.
- Roche Wellness Center: the building, constructed in 1986, formerly housed Hazzouri's pharmacy and drugstore as well as a restaurant named Babe's Place. It was acquired by the university in 1992 and opened as the Student Health and Wellness Center in 1996 and the Drug and Alcohol Information Center and Educators (DICE) Office. The building holds a reception area, four exam rooms, a laboratory, an assessment room, an observation room, and storage space.
- Rock Hall: in 1983, the University of Scranton purchased the Assembly of God Church from the Reformed Episcopalian congregation who could no longer properly maintain the facility as the costs and utilities were too high. Rock Hall houses the Madonna della Strada Chapel, which serves as the primary site for the university's major liturgical services, including the regular Sunday masses. Currently, the first floor of Rock Hall is the home of the university's Military Science department and ROTC program.
- Scranton Hall: constructed in 1871, Scranton Hall was built as a one-story carriage house and stable on the Scranton family Estate by Joseph H. Scranton. In 1928, Worthington Scranton and his wife added an additional story, renovating the building and converting it into an office space. The building was donated to the university in 1958. Since it was acquired, the building has been used to house the President's Office and other administrative offices.
- University Commons are the main walkways through the university's campus. In 1980, the University of Scranton received approval from the Scranton City Council to close to vehicular traffic the portion of Linden Street which ran through the campus in order to unify the campus and create a safer environment for its students. Later, in the early 1990s, the university also closed part of Quincy Avenue and converted it into a pedestrian walkway.

=== Student housing ===
The university has 13 traditional residences: Casey Hall, Denis Edward Hall, Driscoll Hall, Fitch Hall, Gannon Hall, Giblin-Kelly Hall, Lavis Hall, McCormick Hall, Hafey Hall, Lynett Hall, Martin Hall, McCourt Hall, Nevils Hall, which provide housing for freshman students. These residence halls contain traditional double-rooms that share a community restroom on each floor. Most of these buildings were constructed in the 1960s, when the university was becoming a residential campus.

Sophomore students are offered suite-style housing, in which two double rooms share a shower and toilet, with each room having its own sink. There are three buildings, clustered together on the edge of the campus, which house sophomores: Condron Hall (2008), Redington Hall, and Gavigan Hall.

Junior and senior students are offered apartments and houses, which have more private options for residents. The university's apartment buildings include: Linden St. Apartments, Madison Square, Mulberry Plaza, Montrone Hall, and Pilarz Hall. The university also owns a number of residential houses scattered throughout the campus and the historic Hill Section of the city which they use to house students depending on the need for additional housing, most of which were originally acquired during the 1970s and 1980s. These include: Blair House, Fayette House, Gonzaga House, Herold House, Liva House, McGowan House, Cambria House, Monroe House, Tioga House, and Wayne House. After sophomore year, students can also elect to live off-campus in the residential and historic Hill Section located adjacent to the university's campus.

Graduate students can either chose to rent houses in the Hill Section, or live in the university-owned Quincy Apartments, located on the 500 block of Quincy Avenue which was just transformed from an abandoned high school into an early childhood learning center and University graduate housing in 2015.

In 2018 The university renamed McCormick Hall MacKillop Hall and Hannan Hall Giblin-Kelly Hall. The building named Timlin Hall within Mulberry Plazza had its name removed and Mulberry Plazza was renamed Romero Plazza.

These three buildings which were named after Bishops J. Carroll McCormick, Jerome D. Hannan, and James C. Timlin were renamed after a Pennsylvania grand jury report found these bishops ignored accusations of clergy sexual abuse. The university also rescinded honorary degrees bestowed on these three men.

== Athletics ==
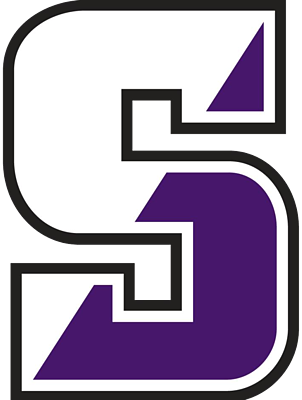
Scranton athletics monogram

Scranton athletes compete at the NCAA Division III. In 2007, Scranton joined the newly formed Landmark Conference, which ended a long history with the Middle Atlantic/Freedom Conference.

The Scranton Norseman Rugby team in October 2007

The university offers 19 varsity sports and has won national championships in Men's Basketball in 1976 and 1983 and Women's Basketball in 1985. The university's basketball teams play at the John Long Center located in the heart of the campus. The university's soccer and field hockey teams play at Fitzpatrick Field, also on campus.

Scranton's athletics teams include basketball, cross country, golf, lacrosse, soccer, swimming, tennis, and track and field. Men's only sports are baseball and wrestling while women's activities include field hockey, softball, and volleyball.

In February 2012, the university fully acquired the South Side Sports Complex in Scranton. The complex was converted into NCAA-regulation fields for soccer, baseball, and softball. The complex includes a child's play area and public basketball courts.

In February 2016, the athletic director suspended the Men's and Women's Swimming and Diving team from the Landmark Conference championship meet for alleged hazing.

In fall 2016, women's golf was added to the athletics program. They debuted with a 5–0 victory in September 2016.

== Student life ==
=== Media ===
The Aquinas, the university's student newspaper, publishes on Thursdays during the academic year. WUSR 99.5 is the college radio station owned and operated by the University of Scranton.

=== Student government ===
The Student Senate came about in the spring semester of 2002 with the ratification of its Constitution. On May 3, 2002, the first Student Senate meeting was held in the Office of Student Activities. Today, the Student Senate assembles for regular sessions on a biweekly basis and for emergency sessions as necessary.

The Student Senate is the main avenue of governance for the students. The Student Senate deals with pertinent issues that affect the day-to-day lives of students at The University of Scranton. The Senate is chaired by the vice-president of student government, who votes only in the case of a tie. The other Executive members of student government are the president, a nonvoting member with veto authority, as well as the secretary and treasurer, both non-voting members. The body of the Student Senate is made up of the non-voting executive positions, and four equal representatives from each class, two commuter representatives, two off-campus representatives, and two resident representatives for a total of 26 members, 22 of which have voting rights.

There are four standing committees formed out of the Senate: Safety and Crime Prevention, Student Life and Dining Services, Academic Affairs, and Appropriations. Proposed legislation is sent to the appropriate committee for research and development at the discretion of the chair. The executive treasurer advises the Appropriations Committee; a senator appointed by the executive council chairs each of the committees.

== University of Scranton Press ==
The University of Scranton Press was a university press that was part of The University of Scranton. Its publications included books on religious and philosophical issues and local (Northeastern Pennsylvania) history, including coal mining. In the summer of 2010, the university announced that it was no longer accepting submissions for publication and would discontinue the Press after all current projects were completed, which it did by the end of the summer.

== University of Scranton presidents ==
There have been 24 presidents of the University of Scranton and four acting presidents.

== Notable people ==
=== Notable alumni ===
There are more than 49,000 alumni worldwide.

- Walter Bobbie – Tony Award-winning theater director (Chicago) and actor (Grease)
- Patrick J. Boland – U.S. Congressman from Pennsylvania (1931–1942) and Majority Whip of the United States House of Representatives (1935–1942)
- Rosemary Brown – American politician, member of the Pennsylvania House of Representatives since January 2011
- Christopher F. Burne – U.S. Air Force Lt. General
- John D. Butzner, Jr. – former United States federal judge - United States Court of Appeals for the Fourth Circuit
- Kevin Byrne (2007) - County Executive for Putnam County, NY (2023–Present) New York State Assembly Member (94th A.D. 2017 - 2023)
- Michael B. Carroll – American politician, Pennsylvania Secretary of Transportation since 2023
- Nestor Chylak – Baseball Hall of Famer and American League umpire from 1954 to 1978
- John L. Gronski (1978) – US Army major general
- Kathleen Kane (B.S. 1988) – former Pennsylvania Attorney General convicted of felony perjury and subsequently disbarred and sentence to jail time
- Jack Keeney (1947) – Longest serving federal prosecutor in U.S. history.
- Lt. Gen. Kevin C. Kiley, M.D. – Former Surgeon General of the United States Army
- Malachy E. Mannion – United States District Judge, United States District Court, Middle District of Pennsylvania
- Kalanithi Maran – founder and Chairman of Sun Network, one of India's largest media houses, majority owner of SpiceJet Airways Private Limited
- James Barrett McNulty – American politician, Mayor of Scranton, Pennsylvania (1982–1986)
- Jason Miller – film actor; Academy Award nominee and Pulitzer Prize-winning playwright (That Championship Season), best known for playing Father Damien in The Exorcist
- Paul Montrone – American business executive, former chairman and CEO of Fisher Scientific
- Patrick O'Boyle (valedictorian 1916) – Archbishop of the Archdiocese of Washington (1948–1973)
- Daniel J. O'Neill (1937–2015), US Army major general
- Diya S. Patel, (B.S. 2023 - Political Science and Criminal Justice) Council Vice President Township of Parsippany-Troy Hills, New Jersey, youngest elected official in Parsippany history and first Indian American and member of GenZ elected to township council
- James O. Ruane (1994) – American criminal defense lawyer
- Robert Schatz - American visual artist
- Harvey Sicherman – American writer and foreign policy expert, President of the Foreign Policy Research Institute from 1993 to 2010
- Sen. Bob Smith (B.A. 1969, M.S. 1970) – Democratic New Jersey State Senator representing NJ's 17th Legislative District
- Tony Smurfit (1963) – British-born Irish businessman and CEO of Smurfit Westrock

==== Fictional alumni ====
- Jim Halpert, former Dunder Mifflin employee played by John Krasinski, The Office
- Ryan Howard, former Dunder Mifflin employee played by B. J. Novak, The Office

=== Notable faculty ===
- Austin App, former chairperson of the English department, first major American Holocaust denier, and author of The Six Million Swindle
- James A. Martin, chairperson of the Department of Theology from 1946 to 1949 and the world's oldest Jesuit until his death in 2007 at age 105

== See also ==
- List of Jesuit sites
- Scranton Preparatory School
