= James Barrett McNulty =

American politician

26th Mayor of Scranton
- In office January 17, 1982 – January 17, 1986
- Preceded by: Eugene F. Hickey
- Succeeded by: David J. Wenzel

Personal details
- Born: February 27, 1945 Scranton, Pennsylvania
- Died: March 2, 2016 (aged 71) Scranton, Pennsylvania
- Party: Democratic
- Spouse: Evelyn “Evie” Rafalko McNulty
- Education: University of Scranton

James Barrett McNulty (February 27, 1945 – March 2, 2016) was an American politician who served as Mayor of Scranton, Pennsylvania.

== Early life ==
McNulty was born in Scranton, Pennsylvania on February 27, 1945 to Henry and Aloise McNulty, the eldest of six siblings. He graduated from St. Patrick's High School in 1962 and the University of Scranton, where he received a degree in political science.

== Mayor of Scranton ==
=== 1981 campaign ===
McNulty ran for mayor in the 1981 mayoral election. The flamboyant and rotund McNulty's trademark was the red rose and the red rose boutonniere he was never without. He also handed out some 20,000 red roses to both supporters and other courted members of the electorate during his career. His main campaign pledge was to try to revive the near dead coal mining city's economy with tourism. His plans helped to boost the city's profile and he won the November election.

=== Building a New Scranton ===
During his term, he undertook several large scale projects designed to build a new economy to replace the lost coal mining industry. He attracted Steamtown, USA, a Hilton Hotels & Resorts (for which grand opening McNulty hired Guy Lombardo's orchestra to play) and the Montage Ski Resort to Scranton, Pennsylvania, which is on a thoroughfare that "Jimmy" stated a million Canadians passed down on their way to gamble in Atlantic City, New Jersey. He convinced Houston Astros owner John McMullen (engineer) to serve as developer of a civic arena for Scranton. This was said to be, itself, a 24 million dollar project.

=== Mayor as promoter ===
McNulty also arranged several publicity stunts to draw attention to the city. He helped plan for the 1983 heavy weight title bout between Easton, Pennsylvania's Larry Holmes and French challenger Lucien Rodriguez to be fought in Scranton and as the network television cameras panned in on the champion Holmes' robe, there inside it was, instead, the 300 pound mayor "Jimmy" McNulty plugging the city of Scranton and its fight.

In the summer of 1982 McNulty gave free rein to the city to Scranton resident Jason Miller to direct the on-location filming of his motion picture That Championship Season based on his Pulitzer Prize winning play of the same name and set in Scranton. Many city locales and properties were featured in the film, including the city council chambers and the mayor's office at Scranton City Hall.

McNulty also traveled extensively promoting "his" city. During the aftermath of Hurricane Gloria, "Jimmy" could be seen in his fire engine red "Scranton No. 1" warm up jacket, conspicuously, personally, directing hurricane cleanup.

== Family and personal life ==
James Barrett McNulty was a cousin to Sister Mary Adrian Barrett.

McNulty was married to Evie Rafalko-McNulty. In 2015, Evie threw her then 70-year-old husband James, who was battling late stage colon cancer, a birthday bash. The couple even managed to weave red roses into the theme. It is said that the turn-out for the party, which doubled as a fund raiser for the Foundation for Cancer Care, was quite large and that the party lasted for hours. Amidst the many politicos present to honor McNulty, including the senior United States senator for Pennsylvania Bob Casey, Jr., and his wife Terese and Pennsylvania Attorney General Kathleen Kane, was then 65 year old Larry Holmes. Evie Rafalko McNulty (born 1959) is, herself, a multi term Lackawanna County, Pennsylvania Recorder of Deeds and a member of the Democratic National Committee. Rafalko-McNulty was a delegate to the Democratic National Conventions in 1992, 1996, 2000, 2004, 2008 and 2012. In 1996, she was a presidential elector for Pennsylvania for William Jefferson Clinton.

In 2015, Rafalko-McNulty was reported to have been snubbed by Pennsylvania Governor Tom Wolf when seeking the position as his Northeast Regional Director. Neither James McNulty nor Evie Rafalko-McNulty would comment to the press. McNulty died from effects of cancer and heart disease on March 2, 2016, in Scranton, Pennsylvania, the city where he had lived his entire life.
