= 2025 Scranton mayoral election =

Local election in Pennsylvania, US

- November 4, 2025
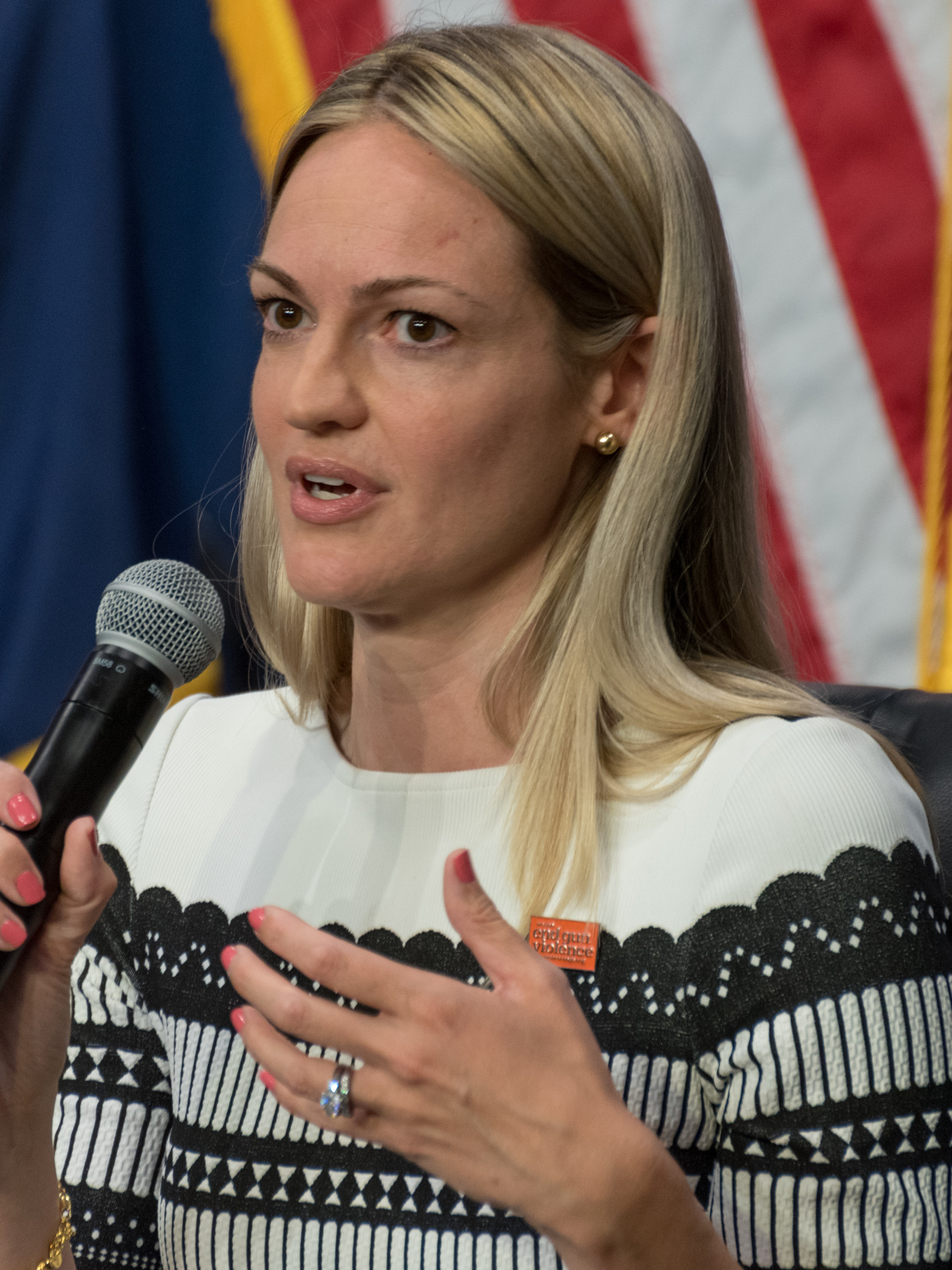

Candidate	Paige Cognetti	Patricia Beynon	Eugene Barrett
Party	Democratic	Republican	Independent
Popular vote	9,701	3,589	3,553
Percentage	57.07%	21.12%	20.90%
Mayor before election
Paige Cognetti
Democratic
Elected mayor
Paige Cognetti
Democratic

The 2025 Scranton mayoral election was held on November 4, 2025, to elect the mayor of Scranton, Pennsylvania. Both major parties primary elections took place on May 20, 2025. Incumbent mayor Paige Cognetti won re-election to a second term.

== Democratic primary ==
=== Candidates ===
==== Nominee ====
- Paige Cognetti, incumbent mayor

==== Eliminated in primary ====
- Robert Sheridan, former Scranton School Board member

==== Withdrawn ====
- Eugene Barrett (running as an independent)

=== Endorsements ===
Paige Cognetti

U.S. senators

- Bob Casey Jr., former senator from Pennsylvania (2007–2025)

Labor unions

- International Brotherhood of Electrical Workers Local 81
- United Brotherhood of Carpenters and Joiners of America Local 445
- United Association Plumbers and Pipefitters Local 524

=== Results ===
2025 Scranton Democratic Party mayoral primary results
Party	Candidate	Votes	%
Democratic	Paige Cognetti (incumbent)	6,264	77.06%
Democratic	Robert Sheridan	1,864	22.94%
Total votes		8,128	100.00%

== Republican primary ==
=== Candidates ===
==== Nominee ====
- Patricia Beynon, accounting executive

==== Eliminated in primary ====
- Lynn Labrosky, business owner

==== Disqualified ====
- Bob Boblus, trucking business owner

=== Results ===
2025 Scranton Republican Party mayoral primary results
Party	Candidate	Votes	%
Republican	Patricia Beynon	926	53.4%
Republican	Lynn Labrosky	808	46.6%
Total votes		1,734	100.00%

== Independents ==
=== Declared ===
- Eugene Barrett, former Scranton Sewer Authority Executive Director
- Rik Little

== General election ==
=== Results ===
2025 Scranton mayoral election results
Party	Candidate	Votes	%
Democratic	Paige Cognetti (incumbent)	9,701	57.07%
Republican	Patricia Beynon	3,589	21.12%
Independent	Eugene Barrett	3,553	20.90%
Independent	Rik Little	154	0.91%
Total votes		16,997	100.00%

== See also ==
- List of mayors of Scranton, Pennsylvania
