= List of mayors of Scranton, Pennsylvania =

Mayor of Scranton, Pennsylvania
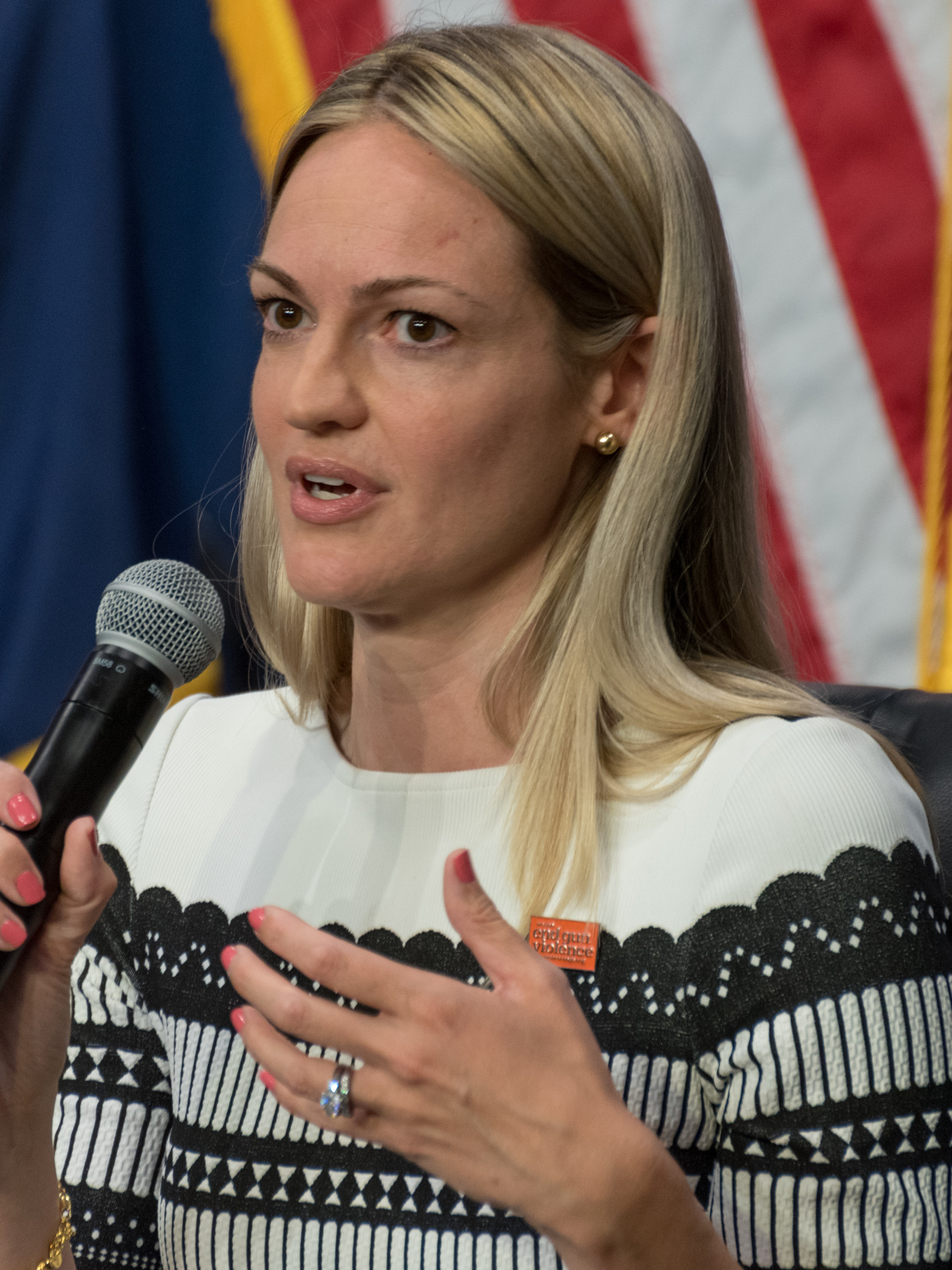
- Incumbent; Paige Cognetti since January 6, 2020
- Inaugural holder: Elliott S. M. Hill
- Formation: 1866

The mayor of Scranton is the chief executive of the government of Scranton, Pennsylvania, as stipulated by the Charter of the City of Scranton. The current mayor of Scranton is Democrat Paige Cognetti.

From 1866, mayors were elected by popular vote.

== List of mayors of Scranton ==
Mayor	Term	Political party
Elliot S.M. Hill	1866–1869	Democrat
William N. Monies	1869–1872	Republican
Mathew W. Loftus	1872–1875	Democrat
Robert H. McKune	1875–1878	Democrat
Terence Vincent Powderly	1878–1884	Greenback-Labor Party
Francis Allen Beamish	1884–1886	
Ezra H. Ripple	1886–1890	Republican
John H. Fellows	1890–1893	
William Lawrence Connell	1893–1896	
James G. Bailey	1896–1899	
James Moir	1899–1901	Republican
William Lawrence Connell	1901–1903	Republican
Alex T. Connell	1903–1906	
J. Benjamin Dimmick	1906–1909	Republican
John Von Bergen Jr.	1909–1914	Republican
Edmund B. Jermyn	1914–1918	
Alex T. Connell	1918–1922	
John F. Durkan	1922–1926	
Edmund B. Jermyn	1926–1930	
Fred K. Derby	1930–1934	
Stanley J. Davis	1934–1938	
Fred J. Huester	1938–1942	
Howard J. Snowdon	1942–1946	
James Thomas Hanlon	1946–1962	Democrat
William T. Schmidt	1962–1966	Republican
James J. Walsh	1966–1970	Democrat
Eugene J. Peters	1970–1978	Republican
Eugene F. Hickey	1978–1982	Democrat
James Barrett McNulty	1982–1986	Democrat
David J. Wenzel	1986–1990	Republican
Jim Connors	1990–2002	Republican (1990–2000); Democrat (2000–2002)
Christopher Doherty	2002–2014	Democrat
Bill Courtright	2014—2019	Democrat
Pat Rogan (acting)	2019	Democrat
Wayne Evans (interim)	2019–2020	Republican
Paige Cognetti	2020 – present	Independent (2020–2021); Democrat (2021–Present)

== See also ==
- Scranton City Hall
- 2025 Scranton mayoral election
