= 1877 Scranton general strike =

1877 strikes and riots in Scranton, Pennsylvania

Scranton general strike
- Part of the Great Railroad Strike of 1877
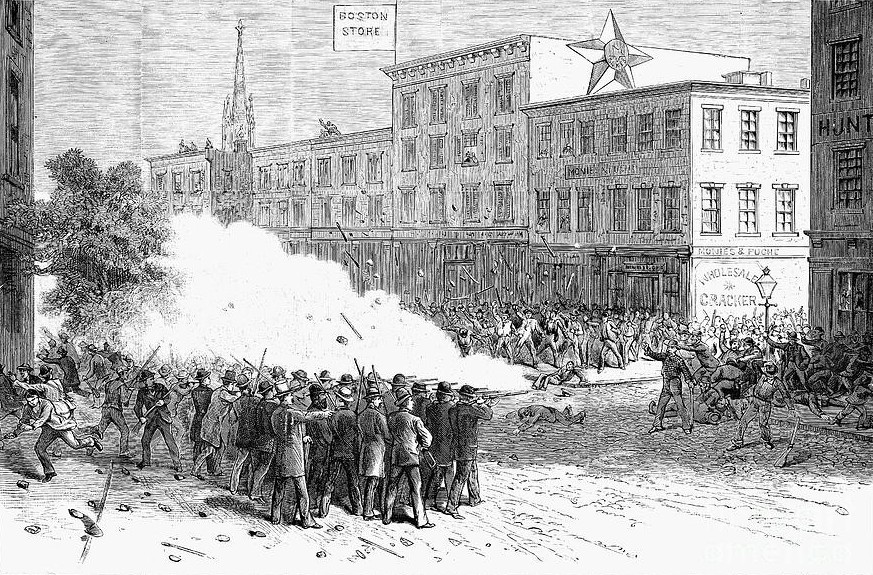
- The Scranton Citizens' Corps fires on strikers, August 1, 1877, by Frank Leslie
- Date: July 23, 1877 – November 17, 1877
- Location: Scranton, Pennsylvania, United States
- Result: Return to work, no concessions won

Casualties
- Deaths: 4
- Injuries: 16–54

The Scranton general strike was a widespread work stoppage in 1877 by workers in Scranton, Pennsylvania, which took place as part of the Great Railroad Strike, and was the last in a number of violent outbreaks across Pennsylvania. The strike began on July 23 when railroad workers walked off the job in protest of recent wage cuts, and within three days it grew to include perhaps thousands of workers from a variety of industries.

Many had returned to work when violence erupted on August 1 after a mob attacked the town's mayor, and then clashed with local militia, leaving four dead and many more wounded. State and federal troops were called to the town, and imposed martial law. Minor acts of violence continued until the last of the strikers returned to work on October 17, having won no concessions. More than a score of those involved in the shooting were arrested for murder, and later tried and found not-guilty of the crime of manslaughter. Two were tried and one convicted in libel suits related to published criticism of the militia. The militia would go on to be reformed into a battalion of the Pennsylvania National Guard.

Opinions differ on the root causes of the strike and ensuing violence.

== Background ==
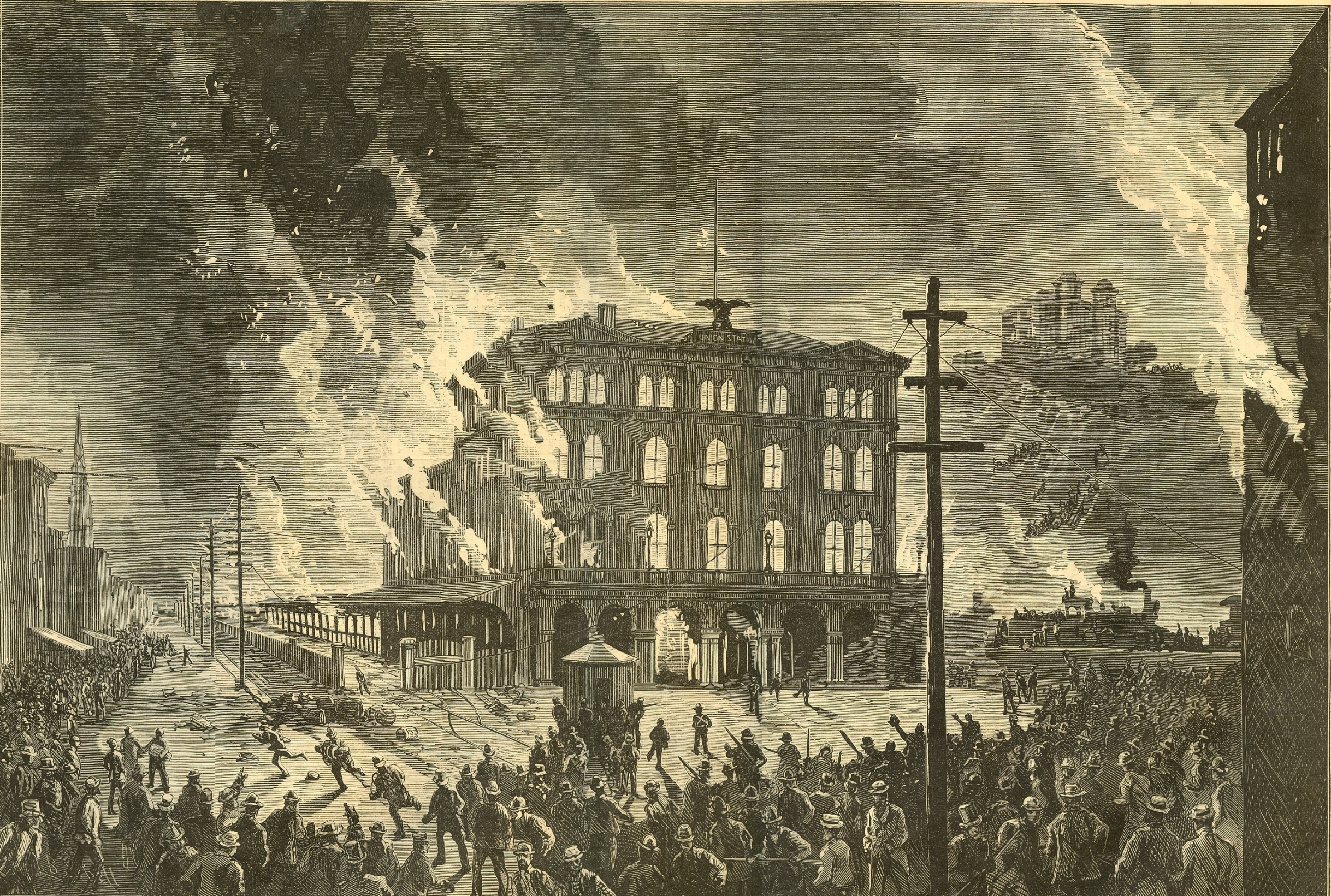
Burning of Union Depot, Pittsburgh, 21–22 July 1877

The Long Depression, sparked in the US by the Panic of 1873, had far reaching implications for US industry, shuttering more than a hundred railroads in the first year and cutting construction of new rail lines from 7,500 miles of track in 1872 to 1,600 miles in 1875. Approximately 18,000 businesses failed between 1873, and in 1875, production in iron and steel alone dropped as much as 45%, and a million or more lost their jobs. In 1876 alone, 76 railroad companies went bankrupt or entered receivership.

The resulting public dissatisfaction erupted July 14, 1877 in Martinsburg, West Virginia, and spread to Maryland, New York, Illinois, Missouri and Pennsylvania. Violence broke out in Pittsburgh, and between July 21 and 22, 40 were killed and more than 1,000 rail cars and 100 engines were destroyed. Another 16 were killed in an uprising in Shamokin, Pennsylvania, and strikers set fire to much of central Philadelphia in disturbances there.

=== Scranton ===
In 1874 mine owners reduced workers' wages by ten percent. Efforts to rouse a strike in response were fruitless. The next two years saw the mines run on two-thirds time, and another wage reduction of fifteen percent was made in 1876. Again, efforts to organize a strike were ineffective.

By the summer of 1877 tensions were high as news spread of the violence in industrial centers across Pennsylvania and the nation. Making matters worse, the local mining companies had again reduced wages, and railroad and industry owners imposed similar cuts for rail and manufacturing workers. As one observer stated "the great trouble here in Scranton is our population, an excess of miners for the work to be done."

== Events of 23–25 July ==
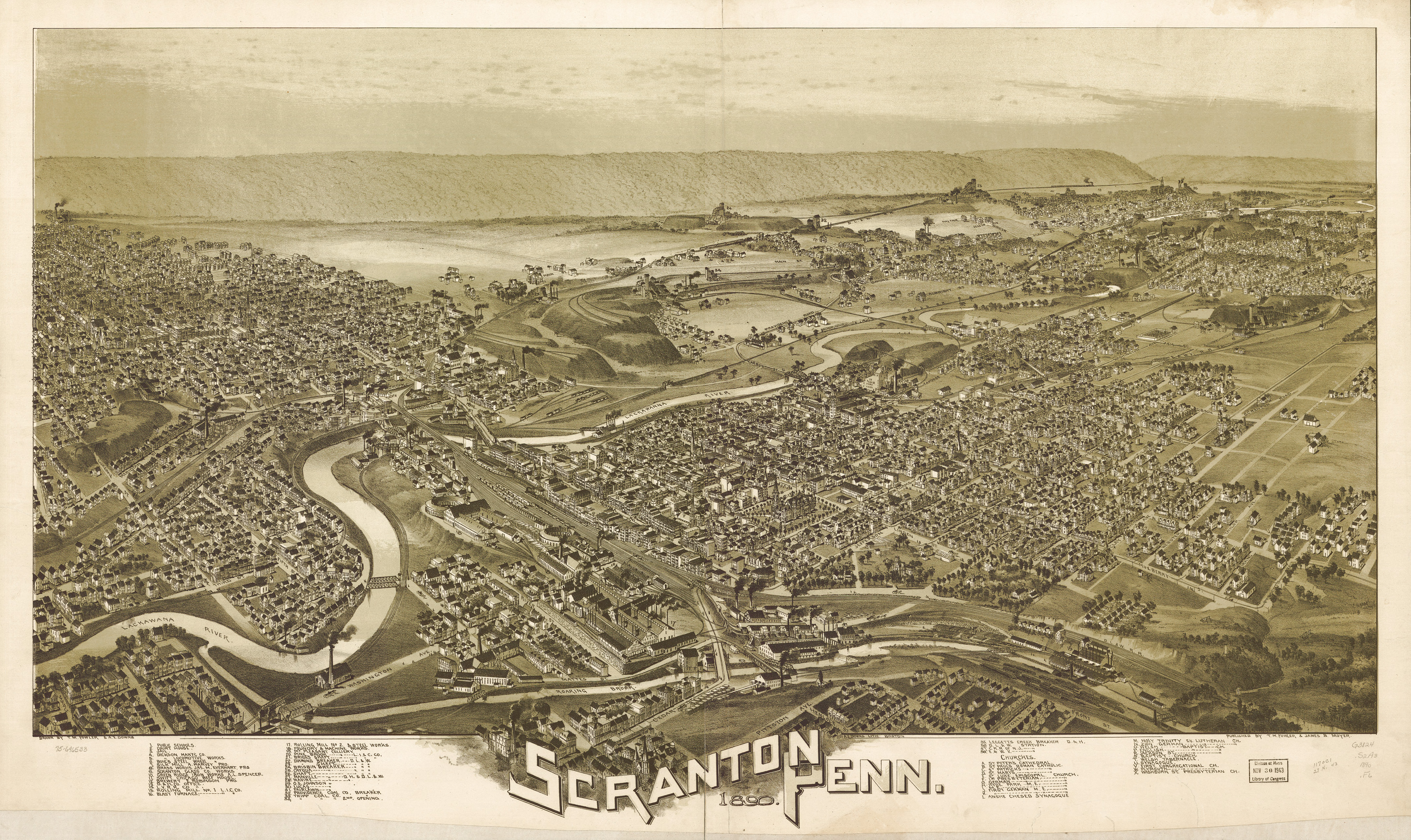
Scranton, as depicted on an 1890 panoramic map

On July 23, the workers of the Delaware, Lackawanna and Western Railroad in Scranton proposed that their wages be restored to that prior to the recently imposed 10% reduction. On July 24 at 12:00 p.m., 1,000 employees of the Lackawanna Iron and Coal Company, unaffiliated with the railroad, peacefully walked out due to their own wage reduction. The railroad workers struck at 6:00 p.m. that same day.

The railroad strike carried implications for the remainder of local industry, as large amounts of goods could not be transported in or out of the city without the use of rail. As one man said, "If the coal trains shall cease to carry the coal to market, the mining of coal must cease." The strikers allowed some passenger trains to reach their destinations. They did not, however, allow mail to enter the city. The strikers met that night at Father Matthew Hall, and agreed to "Be in favor of maintaining the peace and quiet of the city in every emergency."

Mayor Robert H. McKune issued a proclamation, urging "all good citizens to use their best efforts to preserve peace and uphold the law", and to "abstain from all excited discussion of the prominent question of the day." Referring to the recent violence in Pittsburgh, he concluded:

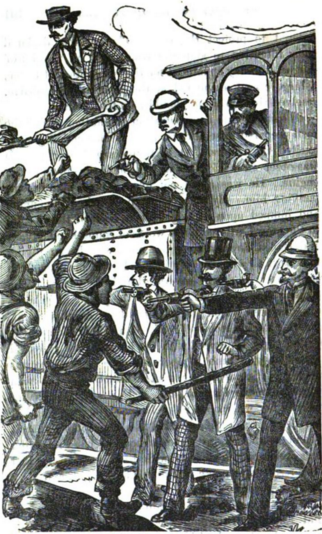
A passenger volunteers as fireman on stopped D&L train.

Every taxpayer will realize that any destruction of property will have to be paid for by the city, and would by so much increase the burden of taxation. In one day Pittsburgh has put upon herself a load that her taxpayers will struggle under for years. I again earnestly urge upon men of all classes in our city the necessity of sober, careful thought and the criminal folly of any precipitate action.

On July 25 The New York Times reported that a general strike had taken place in Scranton. A committee representing the miners called a meeting with W. R. Storrs, coal superintendent. They demanded higher wages, and vowed not to return to work, even if the railroad workers abandoned their strike. The brakemen, firemen and others joined, and every industry in the city was halted with the exception of the Pennsylvania Coal Company.

The railway strikers held a mass meeting and resolved to demand a 25 percent increase in wages, "in order to supply ourselves and our little ones with the necessaries of life." General manager William Walker Scranton replied that same day, insisting that "nothing in the world would give me more pleasure", but continued:

with the present frightfully low prices of iron and steel rails it is utterly impossible for us to advance wages at all ... Our steel works, as everybody knows, are now idle because we have no work to do there. Until the reduction of ten per cent on the 10th of this month there has been no reduction in your wages for nearly a year, while during that time there has been a falling off in the prices we get for iron and steel of over twenty-five per cent. I think you ought to consider these things fully and reflect whether the little work we can give you is not better than no work at all. I assure you when prices will warrant it we shall be very glad to pay wages in proportion.

== Events of 26–30 July ==
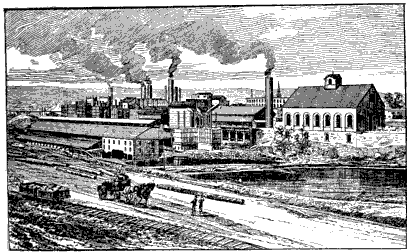
Blast furnaces of Lackawanna Iron and Coal

On the morning of July 26, Mayor McKune proposed organizing a group of armed special police to help maintain order in the city. At the time the local militia were stationed across the state in response to railway strike-related struggles occurring in Altoona, Harrisburg, and Pittsburgh. The police group was later renamed as the "Scranton Citizens' Corps," and included 116 members.

Mayor McKune met on July 27 with representatives of the Brotherhood of Trainmen. Following a meeting of the railway strikers, the firemen and brakemen agreed to return to work at their previous wages. Shortly thereafter, the mill workers returned to work, with assurances from W. W. Scranton. The miners, however, denounced the concession and resolved to continue the strike.

The Citizens' Corps assembled in the Forest & Stream Sportsman's Club and elected officers, including Ezra H. Ripple as their captain. Ripple obtained the approval of General Osbourne, the commander of the Pennsylvania National Guard, to procure arms for the company. Within three days, they acquired 350 guns as well as ammunition.

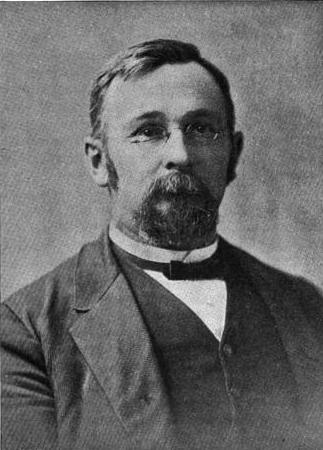
Ezra H. Ripple

Rumors spread that the strike was weakening. Volunteers and others not connected with the miners association took over the mine pumps, which had been abandoned by the miners, in order to prevent flooding of the tunnels.^{Note 1} There were minor acts of violence. The Citizens' Corps prepared for a possible armed confrontation, drilled by those of its members who were Civil War veterans. The group used the mine company store owned by W. W. Scranton as their headquarters, after vacating two other locations because owners feared the presence of the group would attract violence.

A dispatch from Scranton on July 29 summarized the current state of things:

The entire Lackawanna region is idle. Week before last this region sent nearly 150,000 tons of coal to market. Last week it did not send any ... The situation here is absolutely painful, and there is no knowing what moment an outbreak will occur.

On July 30, due to the efforts of Mayor McKune, who assured the strikers that railway traffic would resume even if it meant enforcement by troops, the strikers from the Delaware, Lackawanna & Western Railroad returned to work at their old wages. Telegrams were sent to New York City and Binghamton stating, "all was going to be right again".

The miners denounced the capitulation of the railway workers. Governor John F. Hartranft, informed of the situation by the Mayor, traveled from Harrisburg to Scranton with a force of militiamen and regulars. Some men, termed black-legs, began to flout the strike and return to work in secret.

== Events of August 1st ==
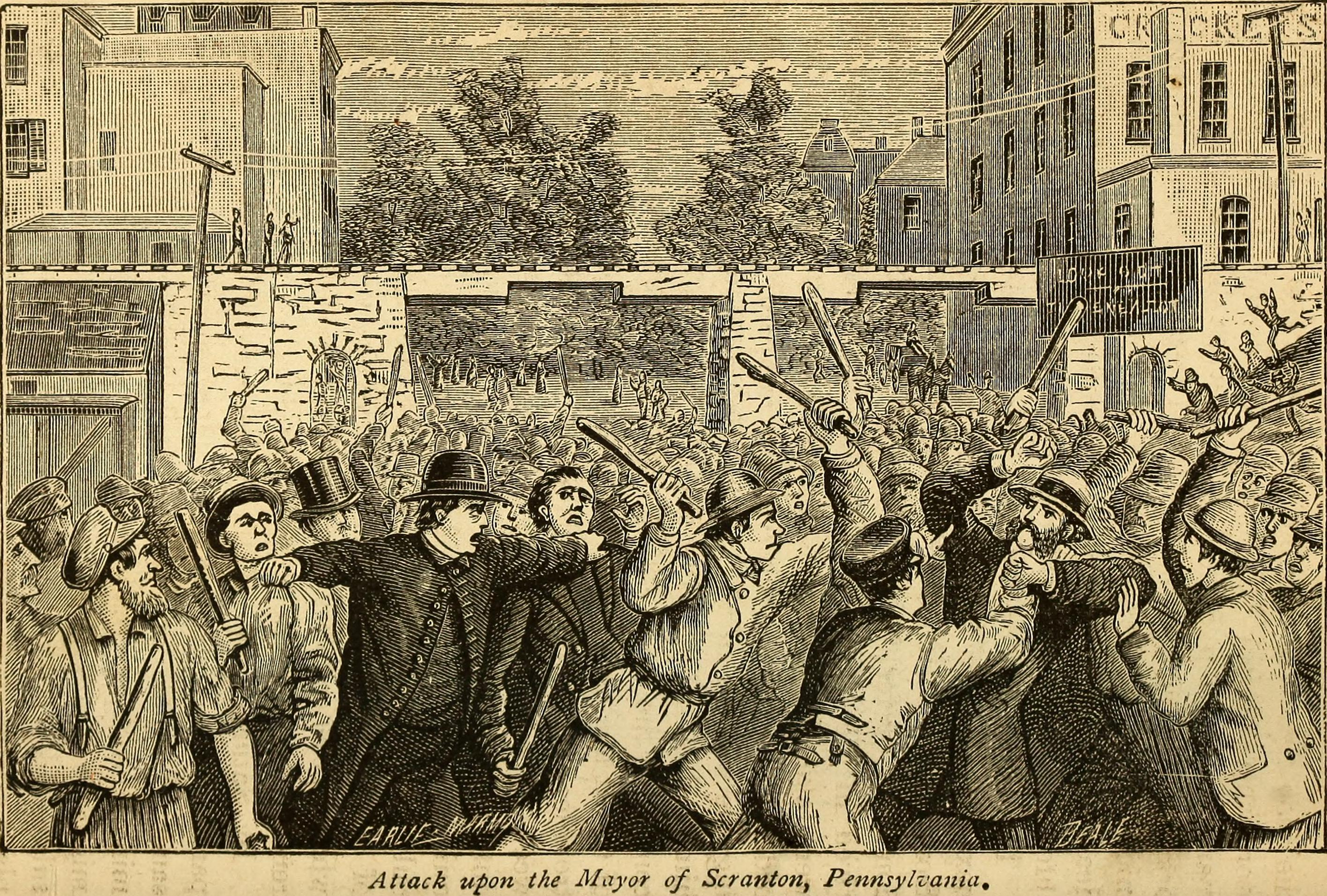
Attack upon Mayor McKune. Father Dunn is seen on the left attempting to restrain members of the mob.

On August 1, as many as 5,000 strikers converged on an open space between a hill and the city's iron mills at 8:00 a.m. They censured those in the companies who had returned openly to work, as well those working in secret. During the meeting, an activist showed a forged letter claiming that Lackawanna Iron and Coal Company would reduce wages to $0.35 per day. W. W. Scranton, manager of the company, later denied this, but the rumor spurred an angry protest. Men yelled, "Go for the shops!," and the crowd moved against the Lackawanna Iron and Coal facilities. They routed other workers and injured some.^{Note 2}

In response, W. W. Scranton (along with First Sergeant Bartholomew, as Captain Ripple was out of town) led an assembly of his own employees and the Citizens' Corps. The Mayor confronted the crowd and urged them to halt, but was struck by a man, knocked down, and badly injured. Cries went up from the crowd, "The Mayor is killed!" He escaped however, aided by Father Dunn, who was carried away by the throng.

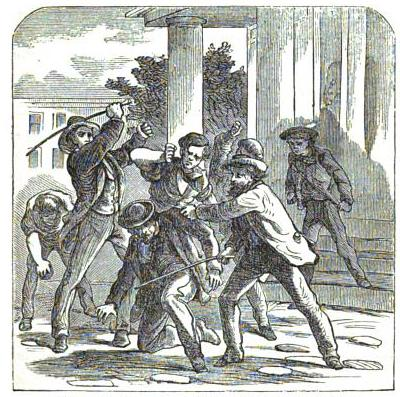
Rioters attacking a citizen

W. W. Scranton's assembly met with the group near Washington Ave, with Bartholomew passing into the crowd along with those following him. As they went they were assailed with jeers of "See the damn vigilantes! We'll take their guns!" Several were struck and knocked down by stones and clubs, with shouts of "Go for their guns, they have only blank cartridges; kill the sons-of-bitches." Pistols were fired and one of the posse was wounded in the knee.

An order was given to fire, though it's doubtful it was heard, and three volleys were released into the crowd. which was quickly dispersed, leaving four dead or dying.^{Note 3} Estimates of the wounded vary from 16 to 54. Father Dunn returned to comfort the mortally wounded.

Over 200 members of the Citizens' Corps were mustered and posted as guards along the streets. At 11:30 AM Mayor McKune issued the following proclamation:

I hereby order all places of business to be immediately closed and all good citizens to hold themselves in readiness to assemble at my headquarters, at the office of the Lackawanna Iron and Coal Company, upon a signal of four long whistles from the gong at the blast furnaces.

He also wired the Governor, who informed that the National Guard brigade from Philadelphia, which had been on the way home from quelling riots in Pittsburgh, had been diverted and were en route to Scranton.

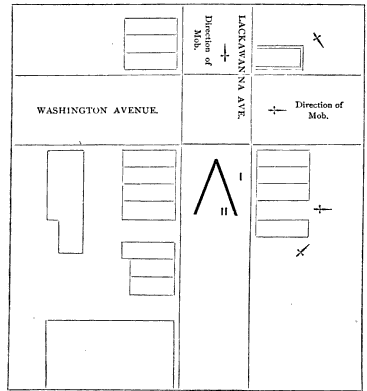
Position of the Citizens' Corps when the battle began, † represents position and direction of mob

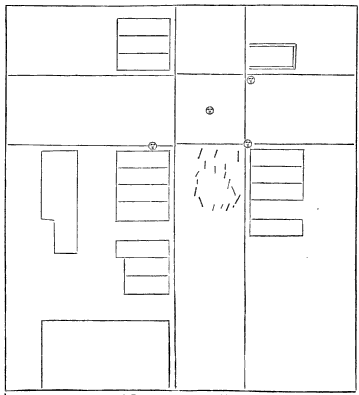
General position of the column at the close of battle, ∵ represents position of bodies

The night passed relatively quietly. Two spies were apprehended hiding in a lumber box wagon, attempting to ascertain the strength and activity of the Corps. They were questioned and released with assurances that the Corps was well prepared for any attack. In the early morning an attack was attempted on W. W. Scranton's residence, but was averted by the patrols that had been dispatched.

== Conclusion and aftermath ==
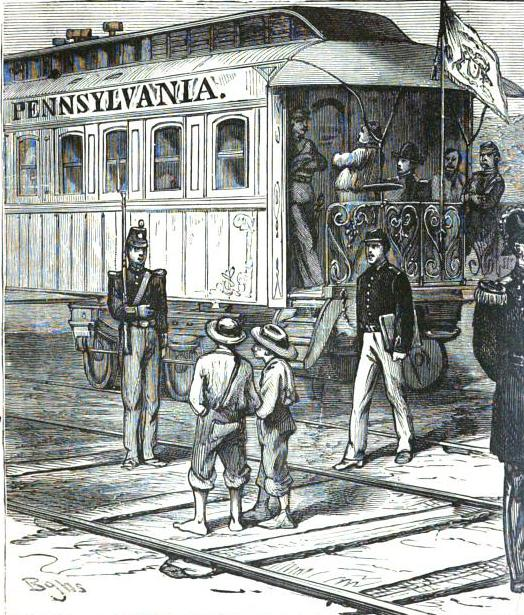
Gov Hartranft's headquarters in a Pennsylvania Railroad car

On August 2 as many as 3,000 troops of the Pennsylvania National Guard First Division arrived from Pittsburgh under the command of Major General Robert Brinton, and imposed martial law.^{Note 4} The troops had arrested an estimated 70 activists en route, and forced those apprehended to repair places where the railroad tracks between the cities had been destroyed.^{Note 5}

The Miner's Executive Committee opened a store for families, stocked by the donations of local businessmen and farmers, to relieve those who were suffering as negotiations to end the strike continued. A piece appeared in the newspaper accusing W.W. Scranton and the men of the Corps of murder. This prompted a meeting of local businessmen at the Anthracite Club, which resolved that the men of the Corps should be commended for their "courageous efforts" in dispersing the mob and averting calamity, and that they would "stand shoulder and purse if need be in their defense." Governor Hartranft arrived in the city along with his staff and 800 men of the Pennsylvania National Guard Second Division, under the command of General Henry S. Huidekoper.

W. W. Scranton wrote August 3 to the Philadelphia Times:

The sullen determination of the strikers in the recent struggle is shown most forcibly by the fact that despite the powerful protection now here for those who desire to pursue their peaceful avocations, none of the miners have returned to work, and the mine pumps are still worked by the bosses and clerks in the employ of the companies ... They will be peaceable while the soldiers are here, but when they go away, they will have many a grievance to redress from their standpoint.

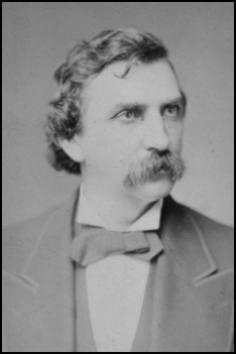
Gov. Hartranft

The Pennsylvania State forces were joined on August 6 by seven companies of United States Regulars under Lieutenant Colonel Brennan, and on August 9 by the Third United States Infantry Regiment under Lieutenant Colonel Henry Morrow. On August 10, General Huidekoper and his state forces departed.

By October 8, some of the miners of the Pennsylvania Coal Company, who were forced to join the strike by the actions of that July, resolved to return to work, but were prevented two days later when the only line of transportation for their coal was burned by the remaining strikers. By this point "outrages" were being committed on a daily basis:

Placing obstructions upon the railroads, burning buildings, firing upon watchmen and pump engineers at the mines, and the robbing of arms in the neighborhood.^{Note 6}

On October 11, W. W. Scranton convinced some to return to work in the Pine Brook mine, and posted a notice that any miner who did not return to work the following day would no longer by employed by the company. Many did, and worked under guard of two companies of soldiers. That evening word came that a mob of some 500 were approaching the city with intent to "fix the black legs" (strikebreakers) at Pine Brook. Men of the guard were assembled at the mine and stood guard till morning. Every night following the 12th, at the request of the mayor, a 40-man garrison stood at the ready.

On October 16 the miners held a meeting and unanimously voted to return to work. They did so beginning the next day, having won nothing in concessions. On October 19, the Governor advised President Rutherford B. Hayes that the federal troops could be withdrawn. The Thirteenth Infantry departed the city on October 31, and Colonel Hartley's temporary forces departed in November 1877.

=== Criminal charges ===
On August 8, a coroner's jury indicted 22 members of the Citizens' Corps on charges of Willful Murder. The arrest warrants were placed in the custody of constables, with orders to execute them. Some of the suspects may not have been present at the time that strikers were killed.^{Note 7} General Huidekoper dispatched troops to take control of the prisoners. This was done primarily to ensure the safety of the men, as it was believed that those who had been in the mob, and compatriots of those slain, intended to do them harm. As W. W. Scranton wrote of the situation:

They hold that we are guilty of murder, and with their aldermanic jury's verdict to back them, they would hold a court of Judge Lynch and hang the unfortunate one of us who got into their clutches without an hour's delay, providing they didn't first tear him to pieces ...

The accused were transferred to the custody of the mayor and sheriff and taken by train to appear before the court in Wilkes-Barre, Pennsylvania, the county seat of Luzerne County, Pennsylvania. At the time, it included the area of Lackawanna County, which was not organized until October 1878. Transportation by wagon was believed to be too dangerous, and would be vulnerable to attack. Again, as W. W. Scranton phrased it, "the whole neighborhood is filled with Molly Maguires."^{Note 8}

Each man was subsequently released August 10 on $3,000 bail. The charge of murder was later amended to manslaughter by the grand jury indictment. The trial was convened November 26 under Judge Harding, with the widow of Patrick Langan, one of those slain on August 1, named as prosecutor. Of the 20 subpoenaed by the prosecution to bear witness to the peaceful nature of the protest, only six appeared to testify. Three admitted to seeing violence committed by the mob prior to the shooting. Many more testified on behalf of the accused.

In his closing remarks for the defense, Stanley Woodward concluded:

We therefore hold that there was a riot, and that these men here charged were in the full heroic performance of their duties as citizens when this unfortunate event occurred. But the blood of these victims must be upon their own heads.

That day the jury returned verdicts of not guilty on all charges. Some of the prominent strikers were also arrested, but none was sentenced to punishment.

=== Libel suits ===
W. W. Scranton filed libel suits in 1879 against Aaron Augustus Chase, editor of the Scranton Daily Times (now the Times-Tribune), and state Judge William Stanton. The suits were related to "inflammatory articles" published in August 1878 in the Scranton Times and Labor Advocate, charging W. W. Scranton with the "crime of murder" during the 1877 strike.^{Note 9} These articles were published during a period of intense lobbying in Pennsylvania to organize an independent Lackawanna County and designate the city of Scranton as its county seat. (The new county was chartered by October 1878.) Stanton had been sitting judge in 1877 and was arrested for libel in the Scranton case after being implicated by witnesses; he was alleged to have written an "incendiary" piece in the Advocate, "calculated to incite the killing of Mr. Scranton".

Two separate trials were held: in September 1879 Chase was found guilty and sentenced to a $200 fine and 30 days imprisonment. Stanton was acquitted in his own trial that month. He had been forced to resign from the judgeship in February 1879.

== Legacy ==
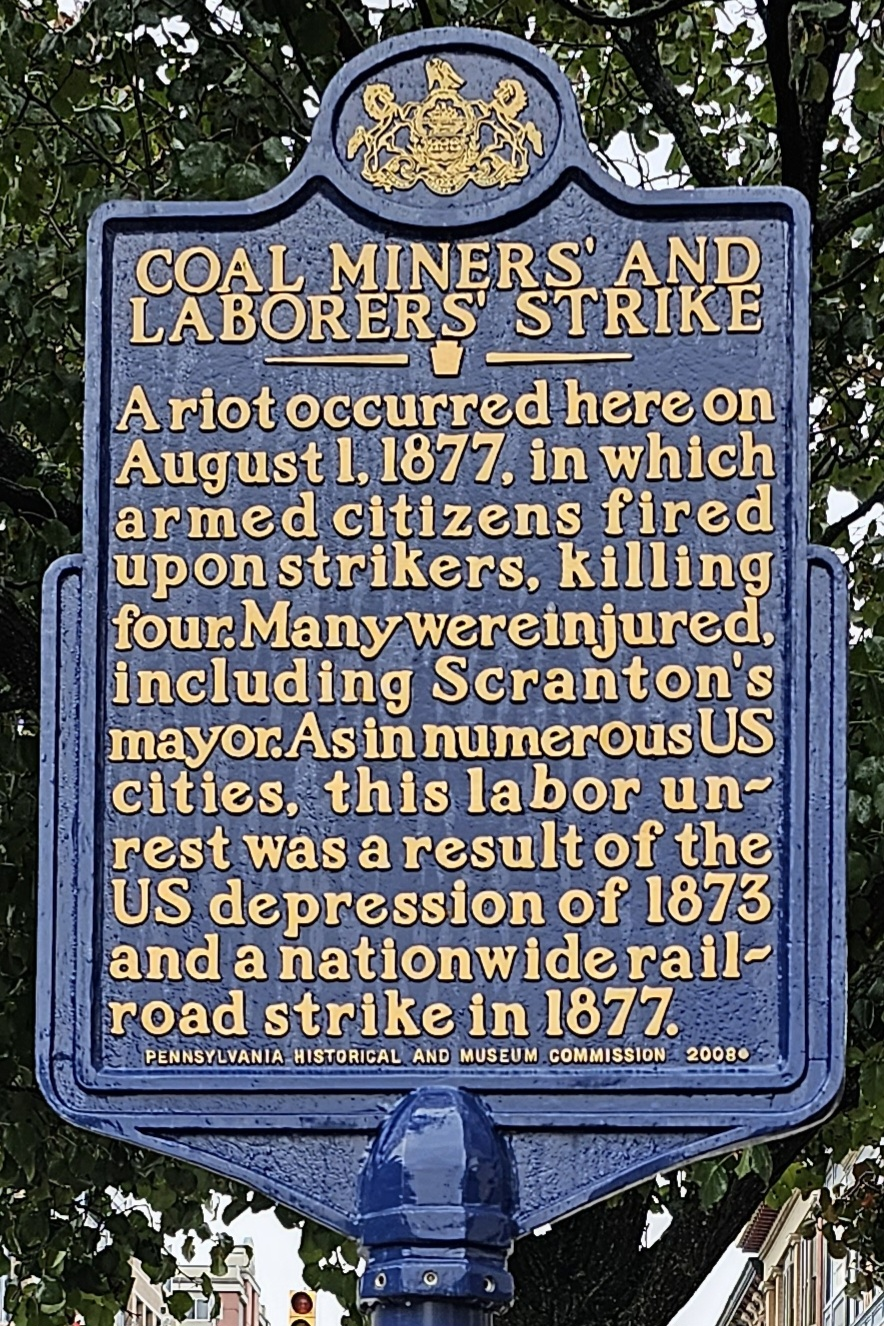
Pennsylvania state historical marker for the strike, erected in 2008

According to Azzarelli, two events stand out in Scranton's labor history: the Great Railroad Strike of 1877 and the 1902 Anthracite Strike. In 2008 the Pennsylvania Historical and Museum Commission placed a historical marker commemorating the 1877 strike in Scranton. The inscription reads:

A riot occurred here on August 1, 1877, in which armed citizens fired upon strikers, killing four. Many were injured, including Scranton's mayor. As in numerous US cities, this labor unrest was a result of the US depression of 1873 and a nationwide railroad strike in 1877.

=== Reformation of the Citizens' Corps ===
Following the uprising, prominent figures in Scranton began advocating for a permanent militia, and within a week nearly a thousand dollars were raised to this effect. On August 8 a meeting was held and it was decided to form a four company battalion, pending approval of the governor and adjutant general. On August 23 a piece ran in The Scranton Republican announcing that the four companies had been formed, and would muster on September 11 for inspection by the governor. In 1878 the Pennsylvania legislature organized the group as the Thirteenth Regiment, Third Brigade, Pennsylvania National Guard. The brigade went on to see action in three other major strikes.

== Interpretation ==
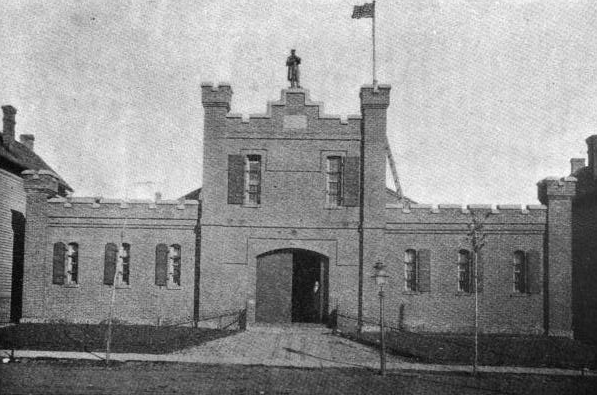
Armory of the Scranton City Guard in 1878

Opinions differ on the root cause of the strike and ensuing violence, and what persons or groups should shoulder the blame.

Historians Hitchcock and Downs emphasized the far-reaching effects of the ongoing depression, inflation, rapidly increasing commodity prices, and mass unemployment, as well as the failure of the strikers to appreciate that these conditions affected the employer as well as the employee.

Evidently the great mass of laboring men failed to comprehend the situation. Too much then, as now, capital was their enemy, not their friend. Too much then, as now, in their way of thinking, there was no limit to the ability of capital. They did not see that capital could not pay wages, buy raw material and manufacture goods unless it could sell its products and get returns. And if a few more intelligent did see these things the pressure of hungry wives and children obscured all reason and they were ready to go along on anything that offered a shadow of relief.

They go on to suggest that some unknown number of those participating in the ensuing riot may have traveled to Scranton expressly for that purpose, and not in support of the strikers or their objectives.

Historian Michael A. Bellesiles suggested that violence became a type of corporate tool rather than a civic last resort: "management consistently refused to negotiate in any way with their workers and relied entirely on military force to settle the contest." He notes a letter in which W.W. Scranton wrote to a friend, "I trust when the troops come,--if they ever get here,--that we may have a conflict, in which the mob shall be completely worsted. In no other way will the thing end with any security for property in the future."

Stepenoff writes of organized labor's "triumph" in the 1878 Scranton mayoral election, and the efforts of then Mayor Terrence Powderly, national leader of the Knights of Labor, to reorganize the police force, "that had disgraced itself in 1877 during a strike of anthracite miners in the Scranton area." In contrast, Logan, who was present as events unfolded, dedicates his book on the topic to the "patriotic young men, who had wisdom to discern the city's danger, and the patient courage to provide for its defense."

== See also ==
- Anti-union violence
- History of rail transport in the United States
- List of incidents of civil unrest in the United States
- List of strikes
- List of worker deaths in United States labor disputes
- Timeline of labor issues and events

== Notes ==
1. "Not a mine in the valley is at work and the most of them are filling fast with water. An idea of the importance of flooding a mine can be obtained from the fact that in 1868 the Diamond Colliery was idle three days for the repair of its machinery, and it took eight months, and cost $30,000 to pump out the water that accumulated in that time."
2. "The storm which had been gathering for more than two hours burst at once, with a violence that threatened the sweeping of the whole city with destruction. A shout was raised: 'Go for the shops' and 'clean out the black-legs' [those who had returned to work during the strike]; and immediately the crowd began to move ... It was at once revealed, through the telescopes of the watchers all along the avenue, that these crowds were armed with clubs, which were shaken in the fury of violence. It was afterwards learned that a store down the valley had been robbed by men on their way to this meeting, showing that, at least some of them had come prepared for mischief."
3. Steven Phillips would die six days later from injuries sustained in the confrontation. Charles Dunleavy, Patrick Lane, and Patrick Langan were killed at the scene of the confrontation. "Seeing the attack at the rear, and the stones flying from the open lot, and hearing the crack of the pistol shots, the Mayor threw uphis hands, waved a bloody kerchief with which he had wiped his face, and shouted, 'Fire, Boys!'"... Whether the soldiers, or their sergeant, heard the command of the Mayor is more than doubtful. The men at the rear of the column, finding no alternative left them, opened fire as by a single impulse ..."
4. The First Division as it arrived in Scranton was composed of the following: 1ST BDE 1ST REGT Infantry, COL R. Dale Benson Commanding; 1ST BDE 2D REGT Infantry, COL S Bonaffon Jr. Commanding; Wecaco Legion, CPT Denny Commanding; Keystone BAT; 2D BDE 2D REGT Infantry, COL Peter Lyle Commanding; 3D BDE 3D REGT Infantry, COL George R. Snowden Commanding; 3D BDE 6TH REGT Infantry, COL Maxwell Commanding; State Fencibles, CPT Ryan Commanding; Black Hussars, CPT Kleinz Commanding; Philadelphia City Troops, CPT A. L. Snowden Commanding
5. One account reckons the number of prisoners at "several hundred".
6. "In the Scranton area on 8 August 'the engineer on the bloomsburg train saw, when about 2 miles form the city, what he supposed to be a woman lying across the track. He stopped and just as ne did so a bullet went whistling through his hat, and he found the obstruction was merely a dummy, placed there to stop the train and give the assassin a chance for the deadly shot.'"
7. "Seven of these men had nothing to do with the firing upon the mob, and some of them were squares away when the firing took place."
8. See Molly Maguires
9. It is difficult to know what newspaper the New York Times was referring to as Labor Advocate. According to the Library of Congress, in that year The Chemung Co. Greenbacker, and Labor Reform Advocate was being published in Elmira, NY. Stanton had been elected as judge in 1877 as a candidate of the Greenbacker-Labor Party. so perhaps this is the correct association. The Greenbacker Party was particularly prominent in the Southern Tier of New York, reaching its peak there in 1878.
