= Jim Connors =

American politician (1946–2024)

28th Mayor of Scranton
- In office 1990 – January 18, 2002
- Preceded by: David J. Wenzel
- Succeeded by: Christopher Doherty

Personal details
- Born: October 1946
- Died: June 26, 2024 (aged 77)
- Party: Democratic (before 1990 and after 2000); Republican (1990–2000)
- Spouse: Susan Blum Connors
- Education: East Stroudsburg University

James Patrick Connors (October 1946 – June 26, 2024) was an American politician who served as the 28th Mayor of Scranton, Pennsylvania, for twelve years from 1990 until 2002.

== Life and career ==
Connors was born in October 1946. He worked as Scranton's Director of Community Development for four years prior to becoming mayor in 1990.

Connors switched his party affiliation from Democratic to Republican prior to running for Mayor of Scranton in 1989. He won the 1989 mayoral election, defeating Democrat Jerry Notarianni to win the first of three consecutive terms. Connors received approximately 15,000 votes, while Notarianni placed second with 13,500 votes.

In 1998, Connors ran for Pennsylvania's 10th congressional district. However, he lost the Republican primary to Don Sherwood. Connors supported Ed Rendell's successful gubernatorial candidacy in 2002. In 2003, Pennsylvania Governor Rendell appointed Connors as the deputy director of his Northeastern Pennsylvania office. Connors retired from the position at the end of 2009 to focus on his family and volunteer work.

Connors died on June 26, 2024, at the age of 77.
