= Paige Cognetti =

American politician (born 1980)

- Cognetti in 2026

Member-elect of the U.S. House of Representatives from Pennsylvania's 8th district
- Assuming office January 3, 2027
- Succeeding: Rob Bresnahan

36th Mayor of Scranton
- Incumbent
- Assumed office January 6, 2020
- Preceded by: Wayne Evans (acting)

Personal details
- Born: Paige Gebhardt; August 27, 1980 (age 46) Eugene, Oregon, U.S.
- Party: Democratic (before 2019, 2021–present); Independent (2019–2021)
- Spouse: Ryan Cognetti
- Children: 2
- Education: University of Oregon (BA); Harvard University (MBA)

Paige Cognetti (née Gebhardt; born August 27, 1980) is an American politician who is the U.S. representative-elect for Pennsylvania's 8th congressional district. Since 2020, she has been the mayor of Scranton, Pennsylvania. Cognetti is Scranton's first woman mayor and won her seat in a special election. A member of the Democratic Party, she ran her first Scranton mayoral campaign as an independent. She was elected to the U.S. House of Representatives on November 3, 2026.

== Early life and career ==
Cognetti was born in Eugene, Oregon. She graduated summa cum laude from the University of Oregon with a Bachelor of Arts in English literature and Romance languages, and earned a Master of Business Administration from Harvard Business School.

After graduating, she worked as an English teacher in Japan through the JET Programme. She was a fundraiser for Hillary Clinton's and Barack Obama's 2008 presidential campaigns and served as an advisor at the U.S. Department of the Treasury in Obama's first term.

Cognetti was appointed to the Scranton School Board in 2017, but resigned in December 2018 to become a special assistant to Pennsylvania's state auditor, Eugene DePasquale. While serving on the board, she criticized no-bid school bus contracts and unapproved payments to contractors.

== Mayor of Scranton ==
Cognetti with President Joe Biden in January 2024

=== Elections ===
Cognetti ran in the 2019 special election to finish the term of Scranton mayor Bill Courtright, who had pleaded guilty to corruption charges earlier that year. She ran as an independent after she deemed the local Democratic Party's closed caucus system undemocratic. Her campaign emphasized investments in local businesses, education, and infrastructure. She won the special election with 36% of the vote.

In 2021, Cognetti ran as a Democrat for a full term and defeated her Republican opponent, 72.5% to 23.4%.

=== Tenure ===
During Cognetti's tenure as mayor, Scranton completed its exit from Pennsylvania's Act 47 financial distress program and improved its bond rating, allowing the city to reduce reliance on short-term borrowing. Her administration undertook infrastructure and public works projects, including investments in stormwater systems and parks, demolition of hazardous structures, and upgrades to municipal signage.

The city's housing stock expanded, while the administration implemented initiatives to modernize municipal operations and improve service efficiency. Downtown redevelopment also continued during this period, accompanied by increased construction activity across the city.

In 2024, President Joe Biden appointed Cognetti to the United States Trade Representative's Advisory Committee for Trade Policy and Negotiations.

== 2026 U.S. House campaign ==
On September 2, 2025, Cognetti announced her candidacy for Pennsylvania's 8th congressional district in 2026, aiming to unseat Republican incumbent Representative Rob Bresnahan. Cognetti ran on an anti-corruption platform, criticizing Bresnahan for his stock trading since becoming a member of Congress.

Cognetti won the election, defeating Bresnahan by nine points.

== Personal life ==
She is married to Ryan Cognetti and has two children.

== Electoral history ==
2019 Scranton mayoral special election
Party	Candidate	Votes	%
Independent	Paige Cognetti	5,849	36.52%
Independent	Kyle Donahue	3,588	22.40%
Democratic	Chris Cullen	2,567	16.03%
Republican	Charlie Spano	2,468	15.41%
Independent	Giovanni Piccolino	699	4.36%
Independent	Gary St. Fleur	384	2.40%
Independent	John Goshleski	76	0.47%
Write-in		387	2.42%
Total votes		16,018	100.00%

2021 Scranton mayoral Democratic primary election
Party	Candidate	Votes	%
Democratic	Paige Cognetti (incumbent)	7,870	71.36%
Democratic	John Murray	3,119	28.28%
Write-in		39	0.35%
Total votes		11,028	100.00%

2021 Scranton mayoral election
Party	Candidate	Votes	%
Democratic	Paige Cognetti (incumbent)	9,851	72.51%
Republican	Darwin Lee Shaw II	3,175	23.37%
Write-in		79	0.58%
Total votes		13,585	100.00%

2025 Scranton mayoral Democratic primary election
Party	Candidate	Votes	%
Democratic	Paige Cognetti (incumbent)	6,271	75.52
Democratic	Bob Sheridan	1,865	22.46
Write-in		168	2.02
Total votes		8,304	100.00

2025 Scranton mayoral election results
Party	Candidate	Votes	%
Democratic	Paige Cognetti (incumbent)	9,701	57.07%
Republican	Patricia Beynon	3,589	21.12%
Independent	Eugene Barrett	3,553	20.90%
Independent	Rik Little	154	0.91%
Total votes		16,997	100.00%

Pennsylvania's 8th Congressional District 2026 Democratic primary results
Party	Candidate	Votes	%
Democratic	Paige Cognetti	58,726	100.0
Total votes		58,726	100.0

2026 Pennsylvania's 8th congressional district election
Party	Candidate	Votes	%	±%
Democratic	Paige Cognetti	154,052	54.5	+5.3
Republican	Rob Bresnahan (incumbent)	128,737	45.5	−5.3
Total votes		282,732	100.0	
Democratic gain from Republican				

U.S. House of Representatives
Preceded by Rob Bresnahan	Member of the U.S. House of Representatives from Pennsylvania's 8th congressional district Taking office 2027	Elect
