= Christopher Doherty =

American politician

29th Mayor of Scranton
- In office January 18, 2002 – January 6, 2014
- Preceded by: Jim Connors
- Succeeded by: Bill Courtright

Personal details
- Born: March 25, 1958 (age 68)
- Party: Democratic
- Spouse: Donna Doherty
- Education: College of the Holy Cross (BA)

Christopher Doherty is an American politician and former mayor of Scranton, Pennsylvania.

== Political career ==
He was first elected mayor of Scranton, Pennsylvania, in 2001.

Doherty served as a speaker and panelist for the Brookings Institution American Assembly and Metropolitan Policy Program as well as the Comparative Urban Studies Project at the Woodrow Wilson International Center.

Doherty was elected to a third term in November 2009.

He was elected president of the Pennsylvania League of Cities and Municipalities (PLCM) in 2006. In 2008, Doherty received the PLCM Distinguished Community Service Award, the Local Government Award for Excellence, and was inducted into the Keystone Society for Tourism.

Doherty was recognized by the United States Conference of Mayors in 2008 for his efforts to protect the City’s tree canopy. In addition, he serves as a member of the steering committee for the Mayor’s Innovation Project, a learning network of America’s mayors dedicated to efficient government. He supports a woman's right to abortion.

== Personal life ==
Doherty is a graduate of the Scranton Preparatory School and the College of the Holy Cross. He and his wife, Donna, have six children. His great-great-grandfather, Hughie Jennings, is a member of the Baseball Hall of Fame.

== Political future ==
Doherty was a candidate in the 2010 Pennsylvania gubernatorial election until February 17, 2010, when he conceded and entered the race to succeed retiring Democratic state senator (and minority leader) Bob Mellow in the 22nd District. Doherty lost in the primary, however, to John Blake. On January 7, 2013, The Scranton Times-Tribune reported that Doherty would not seek re-election as Mayor of Scranton.
