= J. Benjamin Dimmick =

American politician

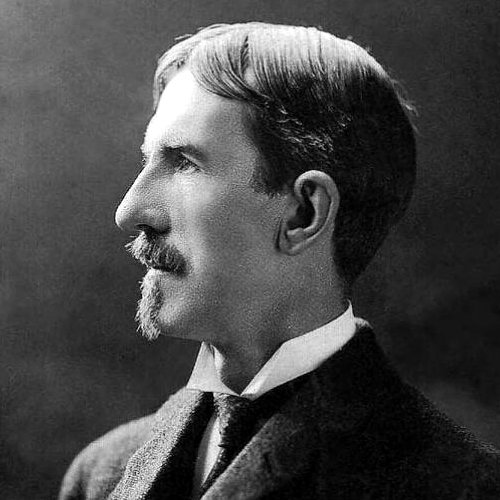

14th Mayor of Scranton
- In office 1906–1909
- Preceded by: Alex T. Connell
- Succeeded by: John Von Bergen Jr.

Personal details
- Born: Joseph Benjamin Dimmick; October 3, 1858 Honesdale, Pennsylvania, U.S.
- Died: January 14, 1920 (aged 61) Stratford, Ontario, Canada
- Party: Republican

Joseph Benjamin Dimmick (October 3, 1858 – January 14, 1920) was a Mayor of Scranton, Pennsylvania during a cholera epidemic.

== Biography ==
Dimmick was born in Honesdale, Pennsylvania. He was the son of Samuel E. Dimmick, a Pennsylvania Attorney General. Dimmick was a Mayor of Scranton during a cholera epidemic. Dimmick had successfully run for Mayor of Scranton in 1906 with a specific aim of improving Scranton's sewerage system. Dimmick, Scranton's thirteenth mayor served until 1909.

In 1914 Boies Penrose was re-elected as the Republican senator for Pennsylvania in preference to Dimmick. Dimmick took the message of the defeat and afterwards confined himself to local politics and public speaking.

Dimmick died in Stratford, Ontario in 1920 and left a wife and two daughters. His widowed sister in law became Mary Dimmick Harrison when she married the former President of the United States, Benjamin Harrison.
