= Scranton City Hall =

- Municipal Building and Central Fire Station, 340
- U.S. National Register of Historic Places
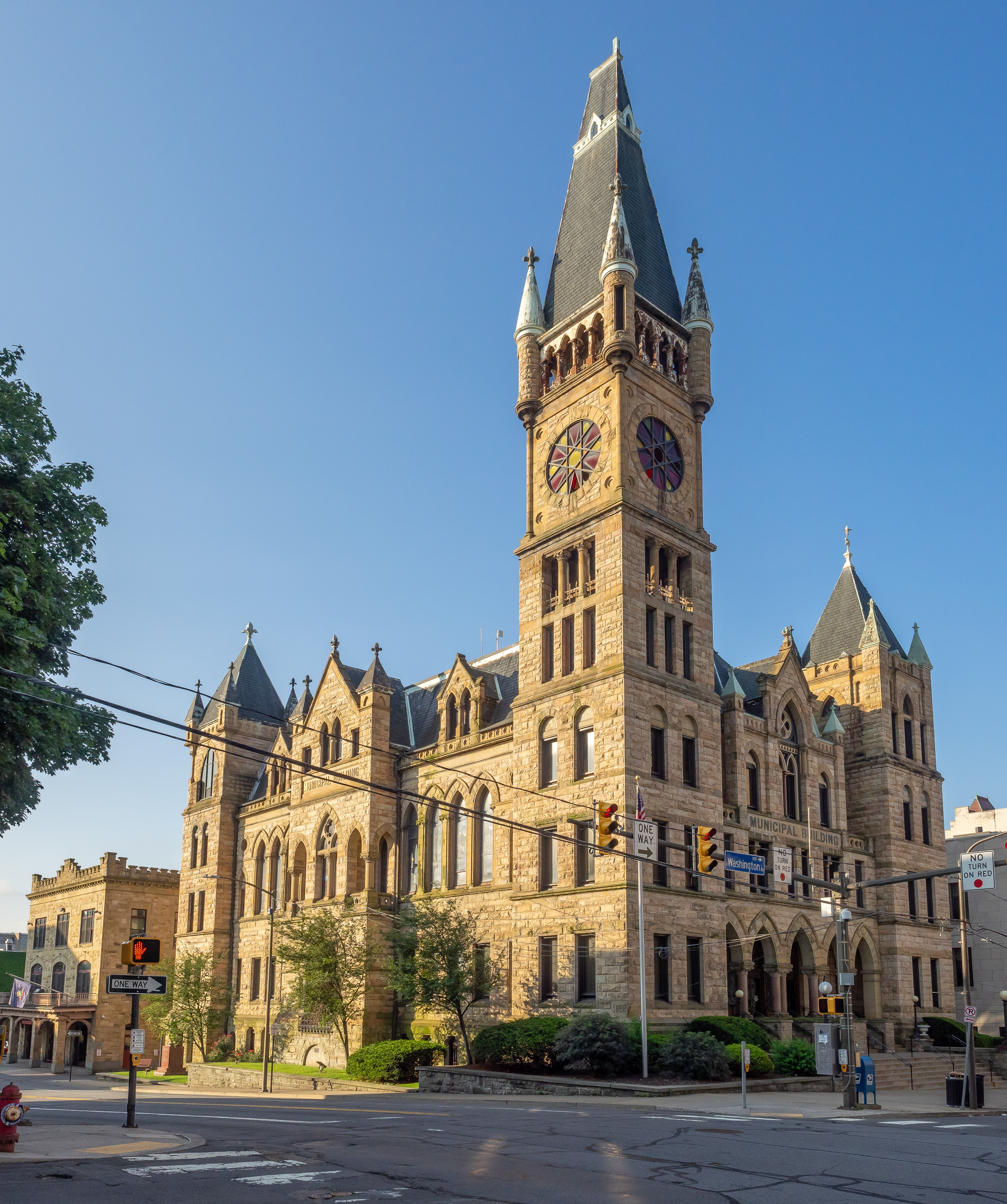
- As seen in 2019
- Location: Scranton, PA
- Coordinates: 41°24′35″N 75°39′42″W
- Built: 1888
- Architect: Edwin L. Walter, Frederick Lord Brown
- Architectural style: Victorian Gothic Revival
- NRHP reference No.: 81000544
- Added to NRHP: 1981

Scranton City Hall is located at Washington and Mulberry (US 11/PA 307) streets in the downtown section of Scranton in the U.S. state of Pennsylvania. It is a three-story limestone ashlar Victorian Gothic Revival building with sandstone trim, designed by architects Edwin L. Walter and Frederick Lord Brown and built in 1888.

The main building, on Washington Street, houses the offices of city's mayor and other executive officers — city clerk, comptroller and police chief - and those who work under their immediate supervision. A bridge from the second story connects it to the fire department headquarters, facing Mulberry Street, built at the same time by the same architects in the same style. Since the two form a larger complex, they were listed together when the building was added to the National Register of Historic Places in 1981 as Municipal Building and Central Fire Station, 340.

== See also ==
- List of mayors of Scranton, Pennsylvania
- Scranton government
