= Robert H. McKune =

American politician (1823–1894)

Robert Hayworth McKune (August 1823 – October 1894) was an American businessman and politician, elected as mayor of Scranton, Pennsylvania, serving 1876 through 1878.

== Biography ==
McKune was born in 1823 in Newburg, NY. (Note: It's not immediately clear if this is a references to Newburgh, New York or Newburgh, New York (town), both of which use alternative spelling.) He began working as a shoe clerk at age 13; he eventually took over his mother's bakery and opened his own grocery store. In 1849 he was among the tens of thousands of men who moved to the West Coast to seek his fortune during the California Gold Rush.

After returning to Pennsylvania, McKune resumed his grocery business. Although nearly 38 when the Civil War began, he enlisted, achieving the rank of first lieutenant. He fought in the Battle of Antietam as a member of the US Keystone Guards.

He was appointed as a US commissioner in 1868. A member of the Democratic Party, in 1875 he was elected the fourth mayor of Scranton, Pennsylvania. In 1877, after the Great Railroad Strike began in West Virginia, he played a pivotal role in the city's preparation for and response to labor unrest, which spread as a general strike and ensuing riots in August.

McKune had long been supportive of legislation to create the independent Lackawanna County from territory of Luzerne County. Scranton was designated as the county seat and a new judicial district was organized for the county. He wrote a memorial of the movement and took part in the laying of the cornerstone of the new county courthouse. In 1879 he was succeeded as mayor by Terence V. Powderly, a Democrat and leader of the Knights of Labor.

McKune died in October 1894 while visiting his sister. He is interred at the Forest Hill Cemetery in Dunmore, Pennsylvania.

== Work ==
- McKune, Robert H. (1882). Memorial of the Erection of Lackawanna County, in the State of Pennsylvania: Comprising an Account of the Progress of the New-county Movement, the Laying of the Corner-stone of the Court-house and a Steographic Report of the Speeches at the Banquet Held at the Wyoming House, Scranton, May 25, 1882. M. R. Walter.
