= Bill Courtright =

American politician

30th Mayor of Scranton
- In office January 6, 2014 – July 1, 2019
- Preceded by: Christopher Doherty
- Succeeded by: Pat Rogan (acting)

Personal details
- Born: December 1, 1957 (age 68) Scranton, Pennsylvania, U.S.
- Party: Democratic
- Spouse: Kim Courtright

William L. Courtright (born December 1, 1957) is an American politician and the former mayor of Scranton, Pennsylvania. He was elected on November 5, 2013, defeating Republican Jim Mulligan, 55%–45%. He was re-elected on November 7, 2017, again defeating Republican nominee, Jim Mulligan, 52%–48%. In October 2020 he was sentenced to 7 years imprisonment on corruption charges. He would be released from prison early in August 2024, afterwards staying in federally supervised home confinement until October 2025.

== Political career ==
Courtright served on the Scranton City Council for six years. He was elected Scranton Tax Collector on November 3, 2009, and served a four-year term.

Courtright was first elected mayor of Scranton, Pennsylvania, in 2013.

== Personal life ==
Courtright and his wife, Kim, have three children, William, Jr., Patrick, and Lindsey.

== Corruption and sentencing ==
FBI agents raided his home on January 9, 2019. The FBI did not immediately disclose what crimes Bill Courtright was suspected of committing.

Courtright pleaded guilty on July 2, 2020, to charges of conspiracy, bribery and extortion. On October 2, 2020, he was sentenced to 7 years imprisonment and ordered to pay a $25,000 fine. On August 27, 2024, he would be released from prison early after serving less than four years of his prison sentence and was then transferred to home confinement, where he was supervised by the Federal Bureau of Prisons’ Philadelphia-based residential re-entry management (RRM) program. His custody period would then end on October 15, 2025 when he was released from home confinement.

== Electoral history ==
Scranton Mayoral Democratic Primary, 2013
Party	Candidate	Votes	%	±%
Democratic	Bill Courtright	6,091	50.9%	
Democratic	Elizabeth Randol	5,068	42.3%	
Democratic	Others	812	6.7%	
Total votes		11,971	100.0%	

Scranton Mayoral Election, 2013
Party	Candidate	Votes	%	±%
Democratic	Bill Courtright	8,782	54.8%	
Republican	Jim Mulligan	7,229	45.2%	
Total votes		16,011	100.0%	

Scranton Mayoral Democratic Primary, 2017
Party	Candidate	Votes	%	±%
Democratic	Bill Courtright (inc.)	4,864	100.0%	
Total votes		4,864	100.0%	

Scranton Mayoral Election, 2017
Party	Candidate	Votes	%	±%
Democratic	Bill Courtright (inc.)	7,452	51.8%	
Republican	Jim Mulligan	6,939	48.2%	
Total votes		14,391	100.0%	
