= Ezra H. Ripple =

American soldier & politician (1842–1909)

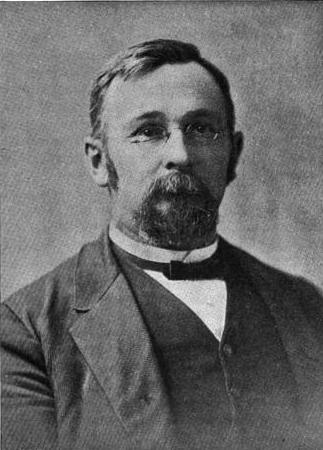
- Ripple in 1877
- Born: February 11, 1842; Mauch Chunk, Pennsylvania, U.S.
- Died: November 19, 1909 (aged 67)

Ezra H. Ripple (February 11, 1842 – November 19, 1909) was a Pennsylvania businessman, politician and soldier.

== Early life ==
Ripple was born in Mauch Chunk, Pennsylvania in present-day Jim Thorpe, Pennsylvania, to Silas and Elizabeth (Harris) Ripple. He married Sarah H. Hackett on April 22, 1874, with whom he had five children.

== Career ==
=== American Civil War ===
He enlisted in the Union Army in March 1864 and fought in the Civil War. He was captured in July 1864 in Charleston, South Carolina and served three months in the Andersonville Prison, and five in the Florence Stockade, from which he escaped but was recaptured. He was honorably discharged June 30, 1865 at Camp Parole, Annapolis.

Following the end of the Civil War, he worked in the crockery business and later in mining as a partner of William Connell & Company.

=== Pennsylvania National Guard ===
In 1877, he served as captain of the Citizens' Corps during the Scranton general strike, and went on to serve as Colonel when the Corps was reorganized into the Thirteenth Regiment, Third Brigade, Pennsylvania National Guard.

He was elected as the first treasurer of Lackawanna County, Pennsylvania in 1879, and as mayor of Scranton, Pennsylvania in 1886. He was later appointed commissary general, and then adjutant general of the Pennsylvania National Guard. In 1901 he was appointed as Scranton postmaster, and reappointed in 1901, and 1909.

== Death ==
Ripple died November 19, 1909.
